= List of schools in rural Western Australia =

This is a list of schools in the state of Western Australia, located outside the Perth metropolitan area. The Western Australian education system traditionally consists of primary schools, which accommodate students from Kindergarten to Year 6, and high schools, which accommodate students from Years 7 to 12. Previously primary schools accounted for Year 7 education, but in 2015 all Western Australian schools transitioned Year 7 to be a part of the high school system. In country areas, District High Schools serve as both a primary and a junior high school, with students generally commuting to or boarding at larger towns to finish the last two years of their education.

== Public schools ==
=== Primary schools ===
Name	Suburb	LGA	Region	Established	Notes
Adam Road Primary School	South Bunbury	Bunbury	South West	1967	
Albany Primary School	Albany	Albany	Great Southern	1855	Split sex school 1874–1894; relocated 2002
Allanson Primary School	Allanson	Collie	South West	1913	Formerly West Collie until 1920
Allendale Primary School	Wonthella	Greater Geraldton	Mid West	1952	
Amaroo Primary School	Collie	Collie	South West	1950	
Augusta Primary School	Augusta	Augusta–Margaret River	South West	1905	
Australind Primary School	Australind	Harvey	South West	1980	Previous schools 1841–1878, 1888–1896, 1905–1948
Avonvale Primary School	Northam	Northam	Wheatbelt	1954	
Babakin Primary School	Babakin	Bruce Rock	Wheatbelt	1913	
Badgingarra Primary School	Badgingarra	Dandaragan	Wheatbelt	1965	
Bakers Hill Primary School	Bakers Hill	Northam	Wheatbelt	1898	
Baler Primary School	South Hedland	Port Hedland	Pilbara	1975	Known as South Hedland No.2 before opening
Balingup Primary School	Balingup	Donnybrook–Balingup	South West	1895	
Beachlands Primary School	Beachlands	Greater Geraldton	Mid West	1956	
Beacon Primary School	Beacon	Mount Marshall	Wheatbelt	1932	
Bencubbin Primary School	Bencubbin	Mount Marshall	Wheatbelt	1923	
Bindoon Primary School	Bindoon	Chittering	Wheatbelt	1954	
Binnu Primary School	Binnu	Northampton	Mid West	1958	
Bluff Point Primary School	Bluff Point	Greater Geraldton	Mid West	1913	Relocated 300m north in 1965
Bolgart Primary School	Bolgart	Victoria Plains	Wheatbelt	1915	
Borden Primary School	Borden	Gnowangerup	Great Southern	1925	
Boulder Primary School	Boulder	Kalgoorlie–Boulder	Goldfields	1897	Central school 1909–1951
Boyanup Primary School	Boyanup	Dardanup	South West	1879	
Braeside Primary School	Katanning	Katanning	Great Southern	1980	
Bremer Bay Primary School	Bremer Bay	Jerramungup	Great Southern	1953	
Bridgetown Primary School	Bridgetown	Bridgetown–Greenbushes	South West	1870	
Broome Primary School	Broome	Broome	Kimberley	1899	
Broome North Primary School	Bilingurr	Broome	Kimberley	2015	
Broomehill Primary School	Broomehill	Broomehill–Tambellup	Great Southern	1893	
Brunswick Junction Primary School	Brunswick Junction	Harvey	South West	1881	
Bunbury Primary School	Bunbury	Bunbury	South West	1895	Relocated in 1962
Busselton Primary School	Geographe	Busselton	South West	1850	1881–1894 split sex; full PS since 1960, relocated in 1998
Cable Beach Primary School	Cable Beach	Broome	Kimberley	1990	
Cadoux Primary School	Cadoux	Wongan–Ballidu	Wheatbelt	1933	
Calingiri Primary School	Calingiri	Victoria Plains	Wheatbelt	1917	
Capel Primary School	Capel	Capel	South West	1885	Known as Coolingup 1897–1904
Carcoola Primary School	Carcoola	Murray	Peel	1971	
Carey Park Primary School	Carey Park	Bunbury	South West	1955	
Cascade Primary School	Cascade	Esperance	Goldfields	1974	Relocated in 1981
Cassia Primary School	South Hedland	Port Hedland	Pilbara	1981	
Castletown Primary School	Castletown	Esperance	Goldfields	1966	
Cervantes Primary School	Cervantes	Dandaragan	Wheatbelt	1973	
Chapman Valley Primary School	Nabawa	Chapman Valley	Mid West	1892	
Clifton Park Primary School	Australind	Harvey	South West	1988	
Condingup Primary School	Condingup	Esperance	Goldfields	1961	
Cooinda Primary School	East Bunbury	Bunbury	South West	1968	Formerly Trott Street PS until 1969
Coolgardie Primary School	Coolgardie	Coolgardie	Goldfields	1894	
Coorow Primary School	Coorow	Coorow	Mid West	1912	Relocated 1952
Cowaramup Primary School	Cowaramup	Augusta–Margaret River	South West	1923	
Cranbrook Primary School	Cranbrook	Cranbrook	Great Southern	1899	
Cue Primary School	Cue	Cue	Mid West	1896	
Dalyellup Primary School	Dalyellup	Capel	South West	2013	Previously part of Dalyellup College; was also separate from 2001 to 2009
Dampier Primary School	Dampier	Karratha	Pilbara	1967	DHS in 1970
Dandaragan Primary School	Dandaragan	Dandaragan	Wheatbelt	1893	
Dardanup Primary School	Dardanup	Dardanup	South West	1880	
Darkan Primary School	Darkan	West Arthur	Wheatbelt	1908	DHS 1962–2009
Denmark Primary School	Denmark	Denmark	Great Southern	2000	
Dumbleyung Primary School	Dumbleyung	Dumbleyung	Wheatbelt	1911	DHS 1970–1990s
Dudley Park Primary School	Dudley Park	Mandurah	Peel	1976	
Dunsborough Primary School	Dunsborough	Busselton	South West	1963	
Dwellingup Primary School	Dwellingup	Murray	Peel	1911	
East Kalgoorlie Primary School	Williamstown	Kalgoorlie–Boulder	Goldfields	1907	
East Manjimup Primary School	Manjimup	Manjimup	South West	1971	
East Narrogin Primary School	Narrogin	Narrogin	Wheatbelt	1963	
Eaton Primary School	Eaton	Dardanup	South West	1967	
Eneabba Primary School	Eneabba	Carnamah	Mid West	1960	
Esperance Primary School	Esperance	Esperance	Goldfields	1894	
Fairview Primary School	Collie	Collie	South West	1959	Formerly Glenlea
Falcon Primary School	Wannanup	Mandurah	Peel	1991	
Flinders Park Primary School	Bayonet Head	Albany	Great Southern	1978	
Frankland River Primary School	Frankland	Cranbrook	Great Southern	1899	
Gairdner Primary School	Gairdner	Jerramungup	Great Southern	1960	
Geographe Primary School	Bovell	Busselton	South West	2002	
Geraldton Primary School	Geraldton	Greater Geraldton	Mid West	1863	Split sex 1868–1894; JHS 1917–1938
Glen Huon Primary School	Eaton	Dardanup	South West	2000	
Glencoe Primary School	Halls Head	Mandurah	Peel	1981	
Goomalling Primary School	Goomalling	Goomalling	Wheatbelt	1906	DHS 1970–1988
Greenbushes Primary School	Greenbushes	Bridgetown–Greenbushes	South West	1893	
Greenfields Primary School	Greenfields	Mandurah	Peel	1990	
Halls Head Primary School	Halls Head	Mandurah	Peel	1995	
Hannans Primary School	Hannans	Kalgoorlie-Boulder	Goldfields	1992	
Harvey Primary School	Harvey	Harvey	South West	1899	
Hopetoun Primary School	Hopetoun	Ravensthorpe	Goldfields	2007	Previous schools 1907–1936; 1946–1951
Hyden Primary School	Hyden	Kondinin	Wheatbelt	1934	
Jerdacuttup Primary School	Jerdacuttup	Ravensthorpe	Goldfields	1964	
Kalannie Primary School	Kalannie	Dalwallinu	Wheatbelt	1930	
Kalgoorlie Primary School	Kalgoorlie	Kalgoorlie–Boulder	Goldfields	1896	
Kambalda Primary School	Kambalda	Coolgardie	Goldfields	1968	
Karratha Primary School	Karratha	Karratha	Pilbara	1971	
Karridale Primary School	Karridale	Augusta–Margaret River	South West	1883	
Katanning Primary School	Katanning	Katanning	Great Southern	1892	JHS 1950–1957
Kendenup Primary School	Kendenup	Plantagenet	Great Southern	1922	
Kirup Primary School	Kirup	Donnybrook-Balingup	South West	1899	Called Upper Capel 1899–1901
Kingston Primary School	Australind	Harvey	South West	2009	
Kondinin Primary School	Kondinin	Kondinin	Wheatbelt	1917	
Koorda Primary School	Koorda	Koorda	Wheatbelt	1920	
Kukerin Primary School	Kukerin	Dumbleyung	Wheatbelt	1914	
Lake King Primary School	Lake King	Lake Grace	Wheatbelt	1935	
Lancelin Primary School	Lancelin	Gingin	Wheatbelt	1960	
Leeman Primary School	Leeman	Coorow	Mid West	1971	
Leinster Primary School	Leinster	Leonora	Goldfields	1977	
Little Grove Primary School	Little Grove	Albany	Great Southern	1997	
Maidens Park Primary School	Withers	Bunbury	South West	1977	Withers PS until 2012
Mandurah Primary School	Mandurah	Mandurah	Peel	1855	
Manjimup Primary School	Manjimup	Manjimup	South West	1911	
Marble Bar Primary School	Marble Bar	East Pilbara	Pilbara	1909	
Margaret River Primary School	Margaret River	Augusta–Margaret River	South West	1909	
Meckering Primary School	Meckering	Cunderdin	Wheatbelt	1896	Relocated 1968
Miling Primary School	Miling	Moora	Wheatbelt	1923	Relocated 1935
Millars Well Primary School	Karratha	Karratha	Pilbara	1981	
Mingenew Primary School	Mingenew	Mingenew	Mid West	1894	
Moora Primary School	Moora	Moora	Wheatbelt	1897	JHS until 1970
Moorine Rock Primary School	Moorine Rock	Yilgarn	Wheatbelt	1945	
Mount Lockyer Primary School	Lockyer	Albany	Great Southern	1954	
Mount Manypeaks Primary School	Manypeaks	Albany	Great Southern	1954	
Mount Tarcoola Primary School	Mount Tarcoola	Greater Geraldton	Mid West	1978	
Munglinup Primary School	Munglinup	Ravensthorpe	Goldfields	1960	
Narrogin Primary School	Narrogin	Narrogin	Wheatbelt	1893	
Newdegate Primary School	Newdegate	Lake Grace	Wheatbelt	1926	
Newman Primary School	Newman	East Pilbara	Pilbara	1969	DHS 1969–1973
North Dandalup Primary School	North Dandalup	Murray	Peel	1900	
North Kalgoorlie Primary School	Lamington	Kalgoorlie–Boulder	Goldfields	1902	
North Mandurah Primary School	Mandurah	Mandurah	Peel	1982	
North Tom Price Primary School	Tom Price	Ashburton	Pilbara	1978	
Northam Primary School	Northam	Northam	Wheatbelt	1864	Split sex 1881–1894; JHS 1917–1920
Nullagine Primary School	Nullagine	East Pilbara	Pilbara	1959	
Nulsen Primary School	Nulsen	Esperance	Goldfields	1972	
Nungarin Primary School	Nungarin	Nungarin	Wheatbelt	1913	
Nyabing Primary School	Nyabing	Kent	Great Southern	1915	
O'Connor Primary School	Somerville	Kalgoorlie–Boulder	Goldfields	1996	
Ocean Road Primary School	Dawesville	Mandurah	Peel	2001	
Ongerup Primary School	Ongerup	Gnowangerup	Great Southern	1914	
Onslow Primary School	Onslow	Ashburton	Pilbara	1895	
Pannawonica Primary School	Pannawonica	Ashburton	Pilbara	1972	
Paraburdoo Primary School	Paraburdoo	Ashburton	Pilbara	1971	DHS until 2000
Parkfield Primary School	Australind	Harvey	South West	1993	
Pegs Creek Primary School	Karratha	Karratha	Pilbara	1978	
Perenjori Primary School	Perenjori	Perenjori	Mid West	1912	
Picton Primary School	Glen Iris	Bunbury	South West	1861	Relocated in 1996
Pingelly Primary School	Pingelly	Pingelly	Wheatbelt	1895	DHS 1954–2005
Pingrup Primary School	Pingrup	Kent	Great Southern	1925	
Pinjarra Primary School	Pinjarra	Murray	Peel	1954	Relocated 1959
Port Hedland Primary School	Port Hedland	Port Hedland	Pilbara	1970	Formerly Cooke Point PS until 1998
Rangeway Primary School	Rangeway	Greater Geraldton	Mid West	1965	
Rapids Landing Primary School	Margaret River	Augusta–Margaret River	South West	2018	
River Valley Primary School	Burekup	Dardanup	South West	1999	
Riverside Primary School	Greenfields	Mandurah	Peel	1995	Originally Teranca PS
Roebuck Primary School	Djugun	Broome	Kimberley	2000	
Salmon Gums Primary School	Salmon Gums	Esperance	Goldfields	1926	
Scaddan Primary School	Scaddan	Esperance	Goldfields	1970	Previous school 1934–?
South Bunbury Primary School	South Bunbury	Bunbury	South West	1913	
South Halls Head Primary School	Halls Head	Mandurah	Peel	2008	
South Hedland Primary School	South Hedland	Port Hedland	Pilbara	1972	
South Kalgoorlie Primary School	South Kalgoorlie	Kalgoorlie–Boulder	Goldfields	1904	
South Newman Primary School	Newman	East Pilbara	Pilbara	1976	
South Stirling Primary School	Porongurup	Plantagenet	Great Southern	1954	Formerly Takalarup
Spencer Park Primary School	Spencer Park	Albany	Great Southern	1959	
Tambellup Primary School	Tambellup	Broomehill–Tambellup	Great Southern	1905	
Tambrey Primary School	Karratha	Karratha	Pilbara	1989	
Tammin Primary School	Tammin	Tammin	Wheatbelt	1900	
Three Springs Primary School	Three Springs	Three Springs	Mid West	1908	
Tom Price Primary School	Tom Price	Ashburton	Pilbara	1967	
Trayning Primary School	Trayning	Trayning	Wheatbelt	1912	
Treendale Primary School	Australind	Harvey	South West	2014	
Tuart Forest Primary School	Dalyellup	Capel	South West	2013	
Useless Loop Primary School	Useless Loop	Shark Bay	Gascoyne	1969	
Vasse Primary School	Vasse	Busselton	South West	1869	moved to current site in 1884; known as Westbrook from 1881 to 1903, Newtown from 1903 to 1938
Waggrakine Primary School	Waggrakine	Greater Geraldton	Mid West	1979	
Walkaway Primary School	Walkaway	Greater Geraldton	Mid West	1887	
Walpole Primary School	Walpole	Manjimup	South West	1954	
Wandering Primary School	Wandering	Wandering	Wheatbelt	1869	Relocated in 1924
Watheroo Primary School	Watheroo	Moora	Wheatbelt	1914	
Wellstead Primary School	Wellstead	Albany	Great Southern	1965	Formerly Cape Riche
West Busselton Primary School	West Busselton	Busselton	South West	1965	
West Northam Primary School	Northam	Northam	Wheatbelt	1906	
Wickepin Primary School	Wickepin	Wickepin	Wheatbelt	1911	
Wickham Primary School	Wickham	Karratha	Pilbara	1971	DHS until 2000
Williams Primary School	Williams	Williams	Wheatbelt	1878	DHS 195?–1989
Wilson Park Primary School	Collie	Collie	South West	1963	
Woodanilling Primary School	Woodanilling	Woodanilling	Great Southern	1902	
Wundowie Primary School	Wundowie	Northam	Wheatbelt	1950	
Yakamia Primary School	Yakamia	Albany	Great Southern	1970	
Yalgoo Primary School	Yalgoo	Yalgoo	Mid West	1897	
Yarloop Primary School	Yarloop	Harvey	South West	1907	
Yealering Primary School	Yealering	Wickepin	Great Southern	1910	
Yerecoin Primary School	Yerecoin	Victoria Plains	Wheatbelt	1928	
Yuna Primary School	Yuna	Chapman Valley	Mid West	1934	Closed 1940–1947

=== District high schools ===
The term "district high school" in Western Australia typically means a primary school combined with a high school on the one campus which services the educational needs of a rural district. The term came into use in the 1970s; prior to this, such schools were either known as "Junior High Schools" or simply "Schools" (covering the same range of years), or "Primary Schools" which were limited to year 7, and started serving high school students only upon becoming DHSs.

Name	Suburb	LGA	Region	Established	Became DHS	Notes
Beverley District High School	Beverley	Beverley	Wheatbelt	1873	1954	
Boddington District High School	Boddington	Boddington	Peel	1912	1958	Formerly Hotham until 1920
Boyup Brook District High School	Boyup Brook	Boyup Brook	South West	1900	1954	
Brookton District High School	Brookton	Brookton	Wheatbelt	1903	1960	
Bruce Rock District High School	Bruce Rock	Bruce Rock	Wheatbelt	1915	1960	
Carnamah District High School	Carnamah	Carnamah	Mid West	1912	1963	
Carnarvon Community College	Carnarvon	Carnarvon	Gascoyne	2018		Formerly: Carnarvon Primary School; East Carnarvon Primary School; Carnarvon Senior High School
Corrigin District High School	Corrigin	Corrigin	Wheatbelt	1915	1958	
Cunderdin District High School	Cunderdin	Cunderdin	Wheatbelt	1902	1954	
Dalwallinu District High School	Dalwallinu	Dalwallinu	Wheatbelt	1912	1964	
Derby District High School	Derby	Derby–West Kimberley	Kimberley	1905	1960	
Dongara District High School	Dongara	Irwin	Mid West	1869	1979	
Donnybrook District High School	Donnybrook	Donnybrook–Balingup	South West	1886	1954	Formerly Minninup until 1896
Dowerin District High School	Dowerin	Dowerin	Wheatbelt	1908	1970	
East Kimberley College	Kununurra	Wyndham–East Kimberley	Kimberley	1964	1977	Formerly Kununurra District High School until 2019
Exmouth District High School	Exmouth	Exmouth	Gascoyne	1965	1968	
Fitzroy Valley District High School	Fitzroy Crossing	Derby–West Kimberley	Kimberley	1953	1982	Was Fitzroy Crossing District High School until 2009 when new building was opened
Gingin District High School	Gingin	Gingin	Wheatbelt	1881	1981	
Gnowangerup District High School	Gnowangerup	Gnowangerup	Great Southern	1908	1957	
Halls Creek District High School	Halls Creek	Halls Creek	Kimberley	1954	1986	
Jerramungup District High School	Jerramungup	Jerramungup	Great Southern	1956	1970	Relocated to current site in 1958
Jurien Bay District High School	Jurien Bay	Dandaragan	Wheatbelt	1966	1992	
Kalbarri District High School	Kalbarri	Northampton	Mid West	1959	2002	
Kambalda West District High School	Kambalda West	Coolgardie	Goldfields	2000	2000	Merger of West Kambalda PS and Kambalda High
Kellerberrin District High School	Kellerberrin	Kellerberrin	Wheatbelt	1905	1954	
Kojonup District High School	Kojonup	Kojonup	Great Southern	1863	1954	Relocated in 1952
Kulin District High School	Kulin	Kulin	Wheatbelt	1916	1966	
Lake Grace District High School	Lake Grace	Lake Grace	Wheatbelt	1914	1962	
Leonora District High School	Leonora	Leonora	Goldfields	1899	1990	
Meekatharra District High School	Meekatharra	Meekatharra	Mid West	1904	1972	
Merredin College	Merredin	Merredin	Wheatbelt	1950		K–1; JHS until 1957; SHS until 2011
Morawa District High School	Morawa	Morawa	Mid West	1923	1954	
Mount Barker Community College	Mount Barker	Plantagenet	Great Southern	2008	2008	
Mount Magnet District High School	Mount Magnet	Mount Magnet	Mid West	1896	1984	
Mukinbudin District High School	Mukinbudin	Mukinbudin	Wheatbelt	1923	1972	
Mullewa District High School	Mullewa	Greater Geraldton	Mid West	1895	1971	
Nannup District High School	Nannup	Nannup	South West	1906	1961	Relocated in 1964
Narembeen District High School	Narembeen	Narembeen	Wheatbelt	1923	1963	
Norseman District High School	Norseman	Dundas	Goldfields	1896	1953	
Northampton District High School	Northampton	Northampton	Mid West	1863	1961	
Northcliffe District High School	Northcliffe	Manjimup	South West	1928	1963	
Pemberton District High School	Pemberton	Manjimup	South West	1914	1954	
Quairading District High School	Quairading	Quairading	Wheatbelt	1912	1954	
Ravensthorpe District High School	Ravensthorpe	Ravensthorpe	Goldfields	1901	1970	
Roebourne District High School	Roebourne	Karratha	Pilbara	1905	2009	
Shark Bay School	Denham	Shark Bay	Gascoyne	1894	2006	
Southern Cross District High School	Southern Cross	Yilgarn	Wheatbelt	1891	1965	
Toodyay District High School	Toodyay	Toodyay	Wheatbelt	1872	1967	Formerly Newcastle; renamed Sep. 1910
Wagin District High School	Wagin	Wagin	Great Southern	1892	1954	
Waroona District High School	Waroona	Waroona	South West	1898	1958	
Wongan Hills District High School	Wongan Hills	Wongan–Ballidu	Wheatbelt	1913	1958	
Wyalkatchem District High School	Wyalkatchem	Wyalkatchem	Wheatbelt	1913	1960	
Wyndham District High School	Wyndham	Wyndham–East Kimberley	Kimberley	1908	1973	
York District High School	York	York	Wheatbelt	1898	1952	

=== High schools ===
Historically, a Junior High School (JHS) was a primary school with a Year 8–10 component (now known as a District High School), a High School (HS) was a high school limited to Year 8–10, whilst a Senior High School (SHS) was a high school extending to year 12.

Name	Suburb	LGA	District	Established	Notes
Albany Senior High School	Albany	Albany	Great Southern	1918	Relocated and became an HS in 1924
Australind Senior High School	Australind	Harvey	South West	1987	
Bridgetown High School	Bridgetown	Bridgetown–Greenbushes	South West	1953	JHS until 1961
Broome Senior High School	Broome	Broome	Kimberley	1990	
Bunbury Senior High School	Bunbury	Bunbury	South West	1923	
Busselton Senior High School	West Busselton	Busselton	South West	1952	JHS until 1957; HS until 1961
Cape Naturaliste College	Vasse	Busselton	South West	2008	8–9 (2009) 8–10 (2010) 8–11 (2011) 8–12 (2012–2014) 7–12 (2015 onwards)
Central Midlands Senior High School	Moora	Moora	Wheatbelt	1971	JHS until 1970; HS until 1974; named Moora until 1973
Champion Bay Senior High School	Karloo	Greater Geraldton	Mid West	1975	Formerly John Willcock College until 2018
Coastal Lakes College	Lakelands	Mandurah	Peel	2019	
Collie Senior High School	Collie	Collie	South West	1899	PS until 1922; JHS until 1945; HS until 1951
Coodanup Community College	Coodanup	Mandurah	Peel	1989	Formerly Coodanup SHS
Dalyellup College	Dalyellup	Capel	South West	2009	DHS from 2009 to 2013; formerly Dalyellup Secondary College
Denmark Senior High School	Denmark	Denmark	Great Southern	2000	Formerly Denmark DHS and Denmark HS
Eastern Goldfields College	Kalgoorlie	Kalgoorlie–Boulder	Goldfields	2005	11–12 only
Eaton Community College	Eaton	Dardanup	South West	2003	
Esperance Senior High School	Esperance	Esperance	Goldfields	1956	JHS until 1965; HS until 1970
Geraldton Senior High School	Geraldton	Greater Geraldton	Mid West	1997	Formerly Geraldton Senior College until 2018; 10–12 only until then, now 7–12
Halls Head Community College	Halls Head	Mandurah	Peel	2001	
Harvey Senior High School	Harvey	Harvey	South West	1950	Agric JHS 1953–1962
Hedland Senior High School	South Hedland	Port Hedland	Pilbara	1964	JHS until 1970; HS until 1971; renamed from Port Hedland 1972
John Tonkin College	Mandurah	Mandurah	Peel	2012	Merger of Mandurah High School and Mandurah Senior College
Kalgoorlie-Boulder Community High School	South Kalgoorlie	Kalgoorlie–Boulder	Goldfields	2005	8–10 only
Karratha Senior High School	Karratha	Karratha	Pilbara	1972	HS until 1974
Katanning Senior High School	Katanning	Katanning	Great Southern	1950	JHS until 1959; HS until 1962
Manea Senior College	College Grove	Bunbury	South West	2009	11–12 only
Manjimup Senior High School	Manjimup	Manjimup	South West	1950	JHS until 1957
Margaret River Senior High School	Margaret River	Augusta–Margaret River	South West	1955	JHS until 1961, HS until 1995 when year 11 introduced, full SHS from 1996
Narrogin Senior High School	Narrogin	Narrogin	Wheatbelt	1950	JHS until 1955
Newman Senior High School	Newman	East Pilbara	Pilbara	1974	PS until 1971
Newton Moore Senior High School	South Bunbury	Bunbury	South West	1966	
North Albany Senior High School	Orana	Albany	Great Southern	1982	
Northam Senior High School	Northam	Northam	Wheatbelt	1921	Split from Northam PS
Pinjarra Senior High School	Pinjarra	Murray	Peel	1921	PS until 1951; JHS until 1960; HS until 1965
Tom Price Senior High School	Tom Price	Ashburton	Pilbara	1967	PS until 1970; JHS/DHS until 1995

=== Other schools ===
This is a list of all other schools operated by, or under, the Western Australian Department of Education and Training. These include special schools for the disabled, the School of the Air and remote community schools which usually represent an Aboriginal community and typically offer a multilingual education in the local language and/or Kriol, and English. While some of these remote schools are new and have been established on behalf of the community, others were previously mission schools and were funded and operated by religious orders or private benefactors.

Name	Suburb	LGA	District	Opened	Notes
Bayulu Remote Community School	Gogo Station, Fitzroy Crossing	Derby–West Kimberley	Kimberley	1957	K–7; formerly Gogo until Jun 1991
Burringurrah Remote Community School	Via Gascoyne Junction	Upper Gascoyne	Gascoyne	1990	K–12
Carnarvon School of the Air	Carnarvon	Carnarvon	Gascoyne	1968	K–7
College Row School	South Bunbury	Bunbury	South West	1957	Education support
Dawul Remote Community School	Doon Doon Station via Kununurra	Wyndham–East Kimberley	Kimberley	1988	K–12
Djidi Djidi Aboriginal School	Glen Iris	Bunbury	South West	1996	Aboriginal specialist
Djugerari Remote Community School	Cherrabun Station via Fitzroy Crossing	Derby–West Kimberley	Kimberley	1964	K–7; Walmajarri
Gascoyne Junction Remote Community School	Gascoyne Junction	Upper Gascoyne	Gascoyne	2005	K–12
Holland Street School	Geraldton	Greater Geraldton	Mid West	1960	Education support
Jigalong Remote Community School	Jigalong	East Pilbara	Pilbara	1952	K–12; Martu
Jungdranung Remote Community School	Glen Hill Station via Kununurra	Wyndham–East Kimberley	Kimberley	1984	K–10
Kalgoorlie School of the Air	Kalgoorlie	Kalgoorlie–Boulder	Goldfields	1962	K–7
Kalumburu Remote Community School	Kalumburu Community	Wyndham–East Kimberley	Kimberley	1962	K–12; Kwini
Kimberley School of the Air	Derby	Derby–West Kimberley	Kimberley	1960	K–7
La Grange Remote Community School	Bidyadanga Community	Broome	Kimberley	1960	K–12; largest RCS in state
Laverton Remote Community School	Laverton	Laverton	Goldfields	1901	1901–2005 called Laverton PS
Looma Remote Community School	Looma Community	Derby–West Kimberley	Kimberley	1984	K–12; prim. Walmajarri; formerly DHS (1998–2003)
Meekatharra School of the Air	Meekatharra	Meekatharra	Mid West	1959	K–7
Menzies Remote Community School	Menzies	Menzies	Goldfields	1897	K–12; 1897–1993 called Menzies Primary School
Mount Margaret Remote Community School	Via Laverton	Laverton	Goldfields	1978	K–7; formerly a mission (from 1920s)
Muludja Remote Community School	Fossil Downs Station via Fitzroy Crossing	Derby–West Kimberley	Kimberley	1991	K–7
Ngaanyatjarra Lands School	Warburton	Ngaanyatjarraku	Goldfields	2005	K–12, multi-campus.; replaced several remote schools
Ngalapita Remote Community School	Ngalapita Community via Fitzroy Crossing	Derby–West Kimberley	Kimberley	2003	K–7
One Arm Point Remote Community School	One Arm Point Community via Broome	Broome	Kimberley	1975	K–12
Pia Wadjarri Remote Community School	Via Murchison	Murchison	Mid West	2003	K–12
Port Hedland School of the Air	Port Hedland	Port Hedland	Pilbara	1964	K–7
Tjuntjunjara Remote Community School	Via Leonora	Ngaanyatjarraku	Goldfields	2008	K–12, Pitjantjatjarra
WA College of Agriculture (Cunderdin)	Cunderdin	Cunderdin	Wheatbelt	1984	Specialist
WA College of Agriculture (Denmark)	Denmark	Denmark	Great Southern	1942	Specialist
WA College of Agriculture (Harvey)	Harvey	Harvey	South West	1953	Specialist; part of Harvey SHS until 1997
WA College of Agriculture (Morawa)	Morawa	Morawa	Mid West	1978	Specialist; agricultural college from 1995
WA College of Agriculture (Narrogin)	Narrogin	Narrogin	Wheatbelt	1914	Specialist; part of Narrogin SHS 1955–1979
Wananami Remote Community School	Kupungarri Community	Derby–West Kimberley	Kimberley	1990	K–12
Wangkatjungka Remote Community School	Wangkatjungka Community, via Fitzroy Crossing	Derby–West Kimberley	Kimberley	1964	K–12; formerly Christmas Creek until Feb 1987
Wiluna Remote Community School	Wiluna	Wiluna	Goldfields	1901	K–12; Martuwangka
Yandeyarra Remote Community School	Yandeyarra Community	Port Hedland	Pilbara	1976	K–12
Yintarra Remote Community School	Coonana	Kalgoorlie–Boulder	Goldfields	1986	K–10; formerly Cundeelee
Yulga Jinna Remote Community School	Via Meekatharra	Meekatharra	Mid West	2003	K–12

=== Defunct public schools ===
==== Closures since 1980 ====
Name	Suburb	LGA	Opened	Closed	Notes
Abrolhos Island School	Abrolhos Islands	Greater Geraldton	1964	2014	Seasonal school on Big Pigeon Island.
Ardath Primary School	Ardath	Bruce Rock	1915	1985	
Balgo Hills Aboriginal School	Balgo	Halls Creek	1962	1984	Became Luurnpa Catholic School
Ballidu Primary School	Ballidu	Wongan–Ballidu	1922	2016	
Benger Primary School	Benger	Harvey	1918	1996	
Bindi Bindi Primary School	Bindi Bindi	Moora	1903	2000	Called Indarrie until 1927
Bodallin Primary School	Bodallin	Yilgarn	1924	2002	
Broome District High School	Broome	Broome	1972	1989	Split to form Broome SHS and Cable Beach PS
Bullfinch Primary School	Bullfinch	Yilgarn	1911	1984	
Buntine Primary School	Buntine	Dalwallinu	1922	2015	
Burekup Primary School	Burekup	Dardanup	1913	1998	Amalgamated into River Valley PS
Burracoppin Primary School	Burracoppin	Merredin	1911	2000	
Camballin Primary School	Camballin	Derby–West Kimberley	1961	1983	Students moved to Looma RCS
Carnarvon Primary School	Carnarvon	Carnarvon	1885	2017	Merged into Carnarvon Community College
Carnarvon Senior High School	Carnarvon	Carnarvon	1954	2017	JHS until 1965; HS until 1971; merged into Carnarvon Community College
Chowerup Primary School	Chowerup	Boyup Brook	1923	1997	
Cockatoo Island School	Cockatoo Island	Derby–West Kimberley	1947	1987	Formerly Yampi until 1959
Coomberdale Primary School	Coomberdale	Moora	1909	1990	
Coonana Primary School	Coonana	Kalgoorlie–Boulder	1942	1980	
Cosmo Newbery Primary School	Cosmo Newbery	Laverton	1959	1987	
Cosmo Newbery Remote Community School	Cosmo Newbery	Laverton	1993	2006	Amalgamated into Ngaanyatjarra Lands School
Deanmill Primary School	Deanmill	Manjimup	1914	1998	
Denmark District High School	Denmark	Denmark	1953	1999	Agric JHS/DHS until 1991
Donnelly River Primary School	Donnelly River	Manjimup	1953	1981	
Doodlakine Primary School	Doodlakine	Kellerberrin	1898	2004	
East Carnarvon Primary School	Carnarvon	Carnarvon	1968	2017	Merged into Carnarvon Community College
Eastern Goldfields Senior High School	Kalgoorlie	Kalgoorlie–Boulder	1914	2005	Split into middle and senior schools
Ejanding Primary School	Ejanding	Dowerin	1926	2000	
Fitzgerald Primary School	Fitzgerald	Ravensthorpe	1967	1995	
Gabbin Primary School	Gabbin	Mount Marshall	1922	2000	
Gascoyne Junction Primary School	Gascoyne Junction	Upper Gascoyne	1960	1997	
Geraldton Senior High School	Geraldton	Greater Geraldton	1939	2005	Split to form Geraldton Senior College and John Willcock College
Gillingarra Primary School	Gillingarra	Victoria Plains	1908	1998	Called Conduin until 1915
Glenorchy Primary School	Mokup	West Arthur	1935	1996	
Goldsworthy Primary School	Goldsworthy	East Pilbara	1966	1992	
Grass Patch Primary School	Grass Patch	Esperance	1966	2015	Earlier school 1927–1934
John Willcock Senior High School	Mount Tarcoola	Greater Geraldton	1975	1997	Amalgamated with Geraldton SHS
Kambalda High School	Kambalda West	Coolgardie	1970	1999	Merged to form Kambalda West DHS
Karlgarin Primary School	Karlgarin	Kondinin	1932	2005	
Koolan Island Primary School	Koolan Ialand	Wyndham–East Kimberley	1961	1992	
Koolyanobbing Primary School	Koolyanobbing	Yilgarn	1966	1983	
Kununoppin Primary School	Kununoppin	Trayning	1912	1993	
Latham Primary School	Latham	Perenjori	1923	2015	
Laverton Primary School	Laverton	Laverton	1901	2005	Renamed Laverton Remote Community School
Mandurah Senior College	Mandurah	Mandurah	2001	2011	11–12 only, merged into John Tonkin College
Mandurah High School	Mandurah	Mandurah	1979	2011	Formerly Mandurah SHS; converted to 8–10 in 2001; merged into John Tonkin College
Marvel Loch Primary School	Marvel Loch	Yilgarn	1910	2005	
Menzies Primary School	Menzies	Menzies	1897	1992	Renamed Menzies Remote Community School
Mollerin Primary School	Mollerin	Koorda	1961	1985	
Mount Barker Primary School	Mount Barker	Plantagenet	1893	2008	Amalgamated with HS to form Community College
Mount Barker Senior High School	Mount Barker	Plantagenet	1952	2008	JHS until 1961. Became a Community College (K–12)
Mount Hampton Primary School	Mount Hampton	Yilgarn	1934	1995	
Mount Walker Primary School	Mount Walker	Narembeen	1927	2005	
Muntadgin Primary School	Muntadgin	Merredin	1930	2005	
Ngurrawaana Remote Community School	Via Roebourne	Roebourne	2005	2009	K–12; Martu; amalgamated into Roebourne.
North Baandee Primary School	North Baandee	Kellerberrin	1920	1990	
North Merredin Primary School	Merredin	Merredin	1907	2011	JHS 1950–1957; amalgamated into Merredin College
Nyamup Primary School	Nyamup	Manjimup	1942	1984	
Ogilvie Primary School	Ogilvie	Northampton	1924	1994	
Oombulgurri Remote Community School	Oombulgurri Community	Wyndham–East Kimberley	1982	2011	K–12; formerly Forrest River Mission
Piawaning Primary School	Piawaning	Victoria Plains	1937	1998	
Pingaring Primary School	Pingaring	Kulin	1923	1998	
Pithara Primary School	Pithara	Dalwallinu	1915	1985	
Port Hedland Primary School	Port Hedland	Port Hedland	1906	1998	
Quinninup Primary School	Quinninup	Manjimup	1925	2004	
Rawlinna Primary School	Rawlinna	Dundas	1920	1995	
Rocky Gully Primary School	Rocky Gully	Plantagenet	1951	2003	
Roelands Primary School	Roelands	Harvey	1903	1998	Amalgamated into River Valley PS
Salt River Primary School	Salt River	Gnowangerup	1924	1986	
Sandstone Primary School	Sandstone	Sandstone	1907	2013	also closed 1967–1977
Shay Gap Primary School	Shay Gap	East Pilbara	1973	1993	
Shackleton Primary School	Shackleton	Bruce Rock	1923	1991	
Shay Gap Primary School	Shay Gap	East Pilbara	1973	1993	
South Merredin Primary School	Merredin	Merredin	1962	2011	Amalgamated into Merredin College
Telfer Primary School	Telfer	East Pilbara	1977	1995	
Tincurrin Primary School	Tincurrin	Wickepin	1921	2015	
Varley Primary School	Varley	Lake Grace	1945	2003	
Wannamal Primary School	Wannamal	Chittering	1920	1984	
West Dale Primary School	West Dale	Beverley	1929	1987	
West Kambalda Primary School	Kambalda West	Coolgardie	1969	1999	Merged to form Kambalda West DHS
Westonia Primary School	Westonia	Westonia	1913	2009	Became campus of South Merredin PS; amalgamated into Merredin College 2012
Wialki Primary School	Wialki	Mount Marshall	1944	1993	
Widgiemooltha Primary School	Widgiemooltha	Coolgardie	1917	1982	
Wittenoom Primary School	Wittenoom	Ashburton	1949	1985	
Wubin Primary School	Wubin	Dalwallinu	1919	2007	
Yorkrakine Primary School	Yorkrakine	Tammin	1901	1980	
Yornup Primary School	Yornup	Bridgetown–Greenbushes	1908	1984	Called Springside until 1929

==== Earlier closures ====
Name	Suburb	LGA	Opened	Closed	Notes
Agnew Primary School	Agnew	Leonora	1937	1948	
Ajana Primary School	Ajana	Northampton	1919	1942	
Albion Downs Primary School	Near Leinster	Wiluna	1961	1975	Relocated to Leinster
Aldersyde Primary School	Aldersyde	Brookton	1915	1968	
Alma Primary School	Alma	Northampton	1905	1956	
Ambergate Primary School	Ambergate	Busselton	1924	1941	
Appadene Primary School	Appadene	Manjimup	1924	1947	
Argyle Primary School	Argyle	Donnybrook–Balingup	1908	1953	
Arthur River Primary School	Arthur River	West Arthur	1909	1943	
Arrino Primary School	Arrino	Three Springs	1906	1952	
Baandee Primary School	Baandee	Kellerberrin	1912	1947	
Badgebup Primary School	Badgebup	Katanning	1920	1947	
Badgerin Rock Primary School	Badgerin Rock	Koorda	1934	1941	
Balbarrup Primary School	Balbarrup	Manjimup	1913	1944	
Balkuling Primary School	Balkuling	Quairading	1922	1978	
Ballaying Primary School	Ballaying	Wagin	1905	1953	
Banksiadale Primary School	Banksiadale	Murray	1913	1964	
Bardoc School	Bardoc	Kalgoorlie–Boulder	1897	1931	
Beenong Primary School	Beenong	Lake Grace	1924	1940	
Beermullah Primary School	Beermullah	Gingin	1924	1962	
Belka Primary School	Belka	Bruce Rock	1921	1944	
Bendering Primary School	Bendering	Kondinin	1920	1950	
Benjaberring Primary School	Benjaberring	Wyalkatchem	1911	1947	
Benjinup Primary School	Benjinup	Boyup Brook	1937	1946	
Beria School	Beria	Laverton	1907	1942	Rebuilt on new townsite 1935, building moved to Linden 1946
Big Bell Primary School	Big Bell	Cue	1937	1955	
Bilbarin Primary School	Bilbarin	Corrigin	1916	1965	
Bonnie Vale School	Bonnie Vale	Coolgardie	1897	1912	
Boogardie Primary School	Boogardie	Mount Magnet	1905	1952	
Bornholm Primary School	Bornholm	Albany	1911	1966	
Boscabel Primary School	Boscabel	Kojonup	1914	1942	
Boulder High School	Boulder	Kalgoorlie–Boulder	1952	1960	
Bowelling Primary School	Bowelling	West Arthur	1918	1948	
Bowgada Primary School	Bowgada	Perenjori	1924	1941	
Bradleys Primary School	Bradleys	Greater Geraldton	1926	1961	
Bramley Primary School	Bramley	Augusta–Margaret River	1925	1954	
Brazier Primary School	Brazler	Donnybrook–Balingup	1908	1953	Formerly Capel Upper until 1928
Bringo School	Kojarena	Greater Geraldton	1907	1949	Formerly Kojarena until 1938
Broad Arrow Primary School	Broad Arrow	Kalgoorlie–Boulder	1897	1961	
Brookhampton Primary School	Brookhampton	Donnybrook–Balingup	1899	1940	
Brown Hill Primary School	Brown Hill	Kalgoorlie–Boulder	1901	1953	
Buckingham Primary School	Buckingham	Collie	1912	1950	Formerly Muja until 1928
Buckland Primary School	Buckland	Northam	1868	1876	Relocated to Wongamine
Bullaring Primary School	Bullaring	Corrigin	1917	1947	
Bulong Primary School	Bulong	Kalgoorlie–Boulder	1897	1918	
Bulyee Primary School	Bulyee	Corrigin	1929	1940	
Bunbury District High School	Bunbury	Bunbury	1917	1922	Became SHS in 1923.
Bungulla Primary School	Bungulla	Tammin	1920	1941	
Burabadji Primary School	Burabadji	Goomalling	1920	1939	
Burbanks School	Burbanks	Coolgardie	1898	1917	
Burtville School	Burtville	Laverton	1906	1920	
Cailbro Primary School	Cailbro	Dalwallinu	1939	1956	
Capel River Primary School	Capel River	Capel	1904	1954	
Carlotta Primary School	Carlotta	Nannup	1933	1947	
Caroling Primary School	Caroling	Quairading	1918	1945	
Caron Primary School	Caron	Perenjori	1925	1972	
Cartmeticup Primary School	Cartmeticup	Woodanilling	1901	1945	
Chadoora Primary School	Chadoora	Perenjori	1937	1961	
Chandler Primary School	Chandler	Nungarin	1943	1953	
Chinocup Primary School	Chinocup	Kent	1929	1937	
Chittering Primary School	Chittering	Chittering	1884	1952	Formerly Lower Chittering until 1909
Clackline Primary School	Clackline	Northam	1896	1976	Relocated 1954
Clifton Primary School	Via Brunswick	Harvey	1905	1967	
Collie Cardiff Primary School	Collie Cardiff	Collie	1916	1950	
Collie North East Primary School	Collie	Collie	1926	1970	North Collie until 1959
Cookernup Primary School	Cookernup	Harvey	1895	1953	
Cossack School	Cossack	Roebourne	1881	1913	
Crossman Primary School	Crossman	Williams	1933	1952	
Culbin Primary School	Culbin	Williams	1933	1952	
Cundinup Primary School	Cundinup	Donnybrook–Balingup	1915	1950	
Dangin Primary School	Dangin	Quairading	1910	1949	
Datatine School	Datatine	Dumbleyung	1916	1943	
Davyhurst School	Davyhurst	Menzies	1903	1915	
Day Dawn School	Day Dawn	Cue	1895	1929	
Denmark Primary School	Denmark	Denmark	1896	1952	Moved and became Agricultural JHS
Dingup School	Dingup	Manjimup	1892	1913	
Dinninup School	Dinninup	Boyup Brook	1902	1939	
Dongolocking Primary School	Dongolocking	Dumbleyung	1911	1944	
Doodarding Primary School	Doodarding	Dowerin	1930	1973	
Dowerin Lakes Primary School	Via Dowerin	Dowerin	1906	1958	
Dudinin Primary School	Dudinin	Kulin	1921	1973	
Duranillin Primary School	Duranillin	West Arthur	1931	1970	Previous school 1906–1912
Dwarda School	Dwarda	Williams	1925	1934	
East Bowes Primary School	East Bowes	Northampton	1906	1961	
East Pithara School	Pithara	Dalwallinu	1934	1941	
Edjudina School	Edjudina	Menzies	1908	1923	
Elleker Primary School	Elleker	Albany	1905	1944	
Emu Hill Primary School	Emu Hill	Narembeen	1914	1938	
Ewington Primary School	Ewington	Collie	1915	1970	
Fairbridge Primary School	Fairbridge	Murray	1915	1978	
Forest Grove Primary School	Forest Grove	Augusta–Margaret River	1923	1960	
Gleneagle Primary School	Gleneagle	Wandering	1939	1966	
Glenoran Primary School	Glenoran	Manjimup	1922	1946	
Gnarabup Primary School	Gnarabup	Augusta–Margaret River	1926	1945	
Golden Ridge School	Golden Ridge	Kalgoorlie–Boulder	1908	1927	Waterfall until 1911
Grass Patch Primary School	Grass Patch	Esperance	1927	1951	
Gullewa School	Gullewa	Yalgoo	1897	1931	
Gunyidi Primary School	Gunyidi	Coorow	1925	1939	
Gutha Primary School	Gutha	Morawa	1919	1952	
Gwalia Primary School	Gwalia	Leonora	1900	1963	
Gwambygine Primary School	Gwambygine	York	1912	1947	
Hamel Primary School	Hamel	Waroona	1905	1944	
Harrismith Primary School	Harrismith	Wickepin	1919	1971	
Hester Primary School	Hester	Bridgetown–Greenbushes	1944	1953	Previous school operated 1908–1920
Highbury Primary School	Highbury	Narrogin	1904	1946	Named Wolwolling 1904–1906
Hines Hill Primary School	Hines Hill	Merredin	1912	1947	
Hoffman Mill Primary School	Hoffman	Harvey	1897	1962	
Holyoake Primary School	Holyoake	Murray	1911	1961	
Huntley Primary School	Huntley	Murray	1930	1958	
Irishtown Primary School	Irishtown	Northam	1868	1948	Formerly Greenhills until 1892
Isseka Primary School	Isseka	Northampton	1908	1951	
Jalbarragup Primary School	Jalbarragup	Nannup	1909	1941	
Jardee Primary School	Jardee	Manjimup	1912	1972	Formerly Jarnadup until 1928
Jarrahwood Primary School	Jarrahwood	Busselton	1912	1972	
Jelcobine School	Jelcobine	Brookton	1932	1945	
Jennacubbine Primary School	Jennacubbine	Goomalling	1911	1955	
Jennapullin Primary School	Jennapullin	Northam	1896	1946	
Jilbadji Primary School	Jilbadji	Yilgarn	1926	1951	
Jindong Primary School	Jindong	Busselton	1924	1954	
Jingalup Primary School	Jingalup	Kojonup	1919	1970	
Kangaroo Gully Primary School	Bridgetown	Bridgetown–Greenbushes	1922	1951	
Kanowna School	Kanowna	Kalgoorlie–Boulder	1896	1940	
King River Primary School	King River	Albany	1894	1946	
Kintore School	Kintore	Coolgardie	1899	1931	
Kondut Primary School	Kondut	Wongan–Ballidu	1918	1942	
Konnongorring Primary School	Konnongorring	Goomalling	1917	1973	
Koojan Primary School	Koojan	Moora	1897	1953	
Kookynie School	Kookynie	Menzies	1901	1967	
Korrelocking Primary School	Korrelocking	Wyalkatchem	1912	1945	
Kudardup Primary School	Kudardup	Augusta–Margaret River	1922	1970	
Kulikup Primary School	Kulikup	Boyup Brook	1914	1942	
Kulja Primary School	Kulja	Koorda	1929	1944	
Kulyalling Primary School	Kulyalling	Brookton	1904	1946	
Kundip Primary School	Kundip	Ravensthorpe	1907	1941	
Kunjin Primary School	Kunjin	Corrigin	1913	1945	
Kurrawang School	Kurrawang	Coolgardie	1905	1938	
Kweda Primary School	Kweda	Brookton	1915	1972	
Kwolyin Primary School	Kwolyin	Bruce Rock	1920	1956	
Lakewood Primary School	Lakewood	Kalgoorlie–Boulder	1904	1964	
Lawlers School	Lawlers	Leonora	1901	1930	
Lennonville School	Lennonville	Mount Magnet	1900	1924	
Linden School	Linden	Menzies	1946	1948	Building moved from Beria, teacher's quarters from North Burracoppin
Lomos Primary School	Lomos	Corrigin	1920	1944	
Lowden Primary School	Lowden	Donnybrook–Balingup	1910	1953	
Lower Balingup Primary School	Balingup	Donnybrook–Balingup	1922	1946	
Lower Chittering Primary School	Lower Chittering	Chittering	1920	1952	
Lower Margaret School	Margaret River	Augusta–Margaret River	1909	1925	
Ludlow School	Ludlow	Busselton	1866	1948	Formerly Ludlow Bridge School
Lyalls Mill Primary School	Lyalls Mill	Collie	1904	1952	
Malyalling Primary School	Malyalling	Wickepin	1910	1943	
Mangowine Primary School	Mangowine	Nungarin	1913	1945	
Mayanup Primary School	Mayanup	Boyup Brook	1904	1945	Formerly Scottsbrook until 1938
Merkanooka Primary School	Merkanooka	Morawa	1912	1947	
Metricup Primary School	Metricup	Busselton	1924	1953	
Middlesex Primary School	Middlesex	Manjimup	1924	1961	
Minnivale Primary School	Minnivale	Dowerin	1911	1974	
Mogumber Primary School	Mogumber	Victoria Plains	1898	1979	Closed 1952–1960; Mogumber: formerly Moore River Native Settlement, then Mogumber Native Mission until 1971
Moodiarrup Primary School	Moodiarrup	West Arthur	1909	1951	
Mooliabeenee Primary School	Mooliabeenee	Moora	1910	1946	
Moonyoonooka Primary School	Moonyoonooka	Greater Geraldton	1888	1952	
Mornington Mills Primary School	Mornington	Harvey	1899	1966	
Moulyinning Primary School	Moulyinning	Dumbleyung	1914	1958	
Mount Ida Primary School	Mount Ida	Menzies	1951	1967	
Mount Kokeby Primary School	Mount Kokeby	Beverley	1903	1945	
Mount Malcolm School	Malcolm	Leonora	1900	1933	Renamed Malcolm School 1900
Mount Monger Primary School	Mount Monger	Laverton	1936	1958	
Mount Morgans Primary School	Mount Morgans	Laverton	1904	1915	
Mount Sir Samuel School	Sir Samuel	Wiluna	1901	1939	
Muchea Primary School	Muchea	Chittering	1905	1952	
Mullalyup Primary School	Mullalyup	Donnybrook–Balingup	1902	1965	
Mulline School	Mulline	Menzies	1905	1924	
Muradup Primary School	Muradup	Kojonup	1910	1970	
Nanga Brook Primary School	Nanga Brook	Murray	1909	1961	
Nangeenan Primary School	Nangeenan	Merredin	1906	1945	
Nanson School	Nanson	Chapman Valley	1913	1943	
Narngulu Primary School	Narngulu	Greater Geraldton	1908	1947	
Needilup Primary School	Needilup	Jerramungup	1923	1976	
Newlands Primary School	Newlands	Donnybrook–Balingup	1900	1953	
Niagara School	Niagara	Menzies	1899	1913	
Nillup Primary School	Nillup	Augusta—Margaret River	1925	1954	
Noggerup Primary School	Noggerup	Donnybrook–Balingup	1909	1960	
North Boyanup Primary School	Boyanup	Dardanup	1933	1946	
North Drakesbrook Primary School	Waroona	Waroona	1910	1943	
Ora Banda Primary School	Ora Banda	Kalgoorlie–Boulder	1912	1957	
Osmington Primary School	Osmington	Augusta–Margaret River	1929	1953	
Paddington School	Paddington	Kalgoorlie–Boulder	1898	1912	
Palgarup Primary School	Palgarup	Manjimup	1921	1964	
Pantapin Primary School	Pantapin	Quairading	1910	1962	
Paynes Find Primary School	Paynes Find	Yalgoo	?	1971	Also 1919–1943
Pindar Primary School	Pindar	Greater Geraldton	1931	1960	
Pintharuka School	Pintharuka	Morawa	1917	1939	
Popanyinning Primary School	Popanyinning	Cuballing	1905	1973	
Quindalup Primary School	Quindalup	Busselton	1899	1963	
Quindanning Primary School	Quindanning	Williams	1893	1960	
Rathmines State School	East Bunbury	Bunbury	1927	1967	Relocated to Trott Street/Cooinda Primary School PS
Reid Primary School	Reid	Kalgoorlie–Boulder	1942	1975	
Rosa Brook Primary School	Rosa Brook	Augusta–Margaret River	1923	1954	
Rosa Glen Primary School	Rosa Glen	Augusta–Margaret River	1925	1953	
Ruabon School	Ruabon	Busselton	1923	1941	
Sandy Gully Primary School	Sandy Gully	Northampton	1944	1956	
Seven Springs School	Seven Springs	Toodyay	1868	1873	
Shannon River Primary School	Shannon River	Manjimup	1950	1968	
Sheoak State School	Karridale	Augusta–Margaret River	1927	1952	A group settlement school
Shotts Primary School	Shotts	Collie	1913	1950	
South Borden Primary School	Borden	Gnowangerup	1933	1945	
South Boulder Primary School	Boulder	Kalgoorlie–Boulder	1920	1971	
South Chittering Primary School	Lower Chittering	Chittering	1930	1952	
Stratham Primary School	Stratham	Capel	1895	1946	
Tenindewa Primary School	Tenindewa	Greater Geraldton	1913	1939	
Tenterden Primary School	Tenterden	Cranbrook	1904	1961	
Tingledale Primary School	Tingledale	Denmark	1925	1968	
Trafalgar School	Trafalgar	Kalgoorlie–Boulder	1900	1930	Boulder Mines until 1901; Lake View until 1906
Treesville Primary School	Treesville	Collie	1923	1956	
Tuckanarra Primary School	Tuckanarra	Cue	1905	1954	
Uduc School	Uduc	Harvey	1899	1921	
Upper Chittering School	Chittering	Chittering	1884	1904	
Upper Ferguson Primary School	Upper Ferguson	Dardanup	1893	1971	
Wadderin Hill School	Wadderin Hill	Narembeen	1919	1936	
Walpole No. 2 & No. 3 schools	North Walpole	Shire of Manjimup	1932	1948	These schools (10 and 15 km up North Walpole Road) were closed and amalgamated into the school in Walpole town, which is extant and called Walpole Primary School.
Warner Glen Primary School	Warner Glen	Augusta–Margaret River	1925	1954	
Waterloo Primary School	Waterloo	Dardanup	1896	1971	
Werribee School	Wundowie	Northam	1930	1949	Students relocated to Wundowie PS
Wellington Mills Primary School	Wellington Mills	Dardanup	1902	1971	
West Toodyay School	Toodyay	Toodyay	1898	1920	
Wilga Primary School	Wilga	Boyup Brook	1910	1956	
Willowdale Primary School	Wagerup	Waroona	1934	1957	
Willyabrup Primary School	Wilyabrup	Busselton	1928	1953	
Winchester Primary School	Winchester	Carnamah	1922	1951	
Wongamine Primary School	Wongamine	Goomalling	1876	1945	Relocated from Buckland
Worsley Primary School	Worsley	Collie	1900	1952	
Wuraming Primary School	Wuraming	Boddington	1915	1956	
Yallabatharra Primary School	Yallabatharra	Northampton	1937	1956	
Yallingup Primary School	Yallingup	Busselton	1905	1963	
Yallingup Siding School	Yallingup Siding	Busselton	1925	1945	
Yalyalup School	Yalyalup	Busselton	1910	1921	
Yandanooka School	Yandanooka	Mingenew	1922	1944	Renamed Overland School 1933
Yandanooka Primary School	Yandanooka	Mingenew	1959	1977	
Yanmah Primary School	Yanmah	Manjimup	1922	1954	
Yelverton School	Yelverton	Busselton	1934	1937	
Youanmi School	Youanmi	Sandstone	1911	1941	
Yunndaga School	Yunndaga	Menzies	1900	1925	Woolgar until 1917
Zanthus Primary School	Zanthus	Kalgoorlie–Boulder	1922	1975	

== Non-government schools ==
=== Catholic Primary Schools ===
Name	Town	Region	Opened	Notes
Assumption Catholic Primary School	Mandurah	Peel	1982	
Birlirr Ngawiyiwu Catholic School	Via Halls Creek	Kimberley	1986	
Holy Rosary School	Derby	Kimberley	1954	
Leschenault Catholic Primary School	Australind	South West	1986	
Our Lady of Lourdes School	Dardanup	South West	1920	
Our Lady of Mt Carmel School	Mullewa	Mid West	1914	
Our Lady of the Cape Primary School	Dunsborough	South West	1996	
Our Lady Star of the Sea Catholic Primary School	Esperance	Goldfields–Esperance	1993	
Sacred Heart Catholic School	Goomalling	Wheatbelt	1912	Formerly Presentation School
St Anne's School	Harvey	South West	1935	
St Bernard's School	Kojonup	Great Southern	1952	
St Brigid's Primary School	Bridgetown	South West	1925	Present structure built 1956
St Brigid's Primary School	Collie	South West	1902	
St Cecilia's Catholic Primary School	Port Hedland	Pilbara	1942	
St Damien's Catholic Primary School	Dawesville	Peel	2007	
St Francis Xavier Catholic Primary School	Geraldton	Mid West	1978	
St John's Primary School	Rangeway	Mid West	1969	
St Joseph's School	Boulder	Goldfields	1897	
St Joseph's Catholic Primary School	Pinjarra	Peel	1930	
St Joseph's Catholic Primary School	Kununurra	Kimberley	1967	
St Joseph's Primary School	Moora	Wheatbelt	1910	
St Joseph's Catholic Primary School	Pemberton	South West	1952	
St Joseph's Primary School	Southern Cross	Wheatbelt	1906	
St Joseph's Primary School	Waroona	South West	1943	
St Joseph's Catholic Primary School	Withers	South West	1978	
St Joseph's Primary School	Wyndham	Kimberley	1964	
St Lawrence's Primary School	Bluff Point (Geraldton)	Mid West	1940	
St Mary's Catholic Primary School	South Bunbury	South West	1904	
St Mary's Catholic School	Boyup Brook	South West	1957	
St Mary's School	Donnybrook	South West	1916	Formerly St Philomena's
St Mary's Primary School	Kalgoorlie	Goldfields	1901	Formerly St Michael's to 1975, then KCPS to 1998
St Mary's School	Merredin	Wheatbelt	1926	Formerly St Joseph's until 1996
St Mary's School	Northampton	Mid West	1868	
St Matthew's Catholic Primary School	Narrogin	Wheatbelt	1918	
St Michael's School	Brunswick Junction	South West	1954	
St Patrick's School	Katanning	Great Southern	1912	
St Paul's Primary School	Karratha	Pilbara	1978	
St Thomas More Catholic Primary School	Margaret River	South West	1993	
Warlawurru Catholic Primary School	Halls Creek	Kimberley	1987	

=== Catholic K–12 and secondary schools ===
Name	Town	Region	Category	M/F/Co-ed	Opened	Notes
Bunbury Catholic College	Bunbury	South West	Catholic	Co-ed	1973	
Christ The King Catholic School	Lombadina	Kimberley	Catholic	Co-ed	1913	Formerly Lombadina Mission and Djarindjin Lombadina Catholic School
Geraldton Flexible Learning Centre	Geraldton	Mid West	Catholic	Co-ed		Alternative
Immaculate Heart College	Lower Chittering	Wheatbelt	Independent Catholic	Co-ed	2012	
John Paul College	Kalgoorlie	Goldfields	Catholic	Co-ed	1984	
John Pujajangka Piyirn School	Via Halls Creek, Mulan		Aboriginal Catholic	Co-ed	1979	
Kearnan College	Manjimup	South West	Catholic	Co-ed	1925	Formerly St Joseph's until 1972
Kururrungku Catholic Education Centre	Mindibungu Community	Kimberley	Catholic	Co-ed	1984	
Luurnpa Catholic School	Balgo	Kimberley	Catholic	Co-ed	1984	Kukatja/English
Mandurah Catholic College	Mandurah	Peel	Catholic	Co-ed	1992	
Nagle Catholic College	Geraldton	Mid West	Catholic	Co-ed	1994	Founded as a result of merger of Stella Maris College (1891) and St. Patrick's College (1926)
Ngalangangpum School	Warmun	Kimberley	Catholic	Co-ed	1979	Kija/English
Our Lady of Mercy College	Australind	South West	Catholic	Co-ed	2020	Originally a second campus of Bunbury Catholic College
Sacred Heart School	Beagle Bay Community	Kimberley	Catholic	Co-ed	1892	
St Joseph's College (Albany)	Spencer Park	Great Southern	Catholic	Co-ed	1978	
St Joseph's School	Northam	Wheatbelt	Catholic	Co-ed	1948	Formerly Marist Brothers School
St Luke's College	Karratha	Pilbara	Catholic	Co-ed	1987	
St Marcellin Catholic College	Madora Bay	Peel	Catholic	Co-ed	2025	
St Martin De Porres School	Cable Beach		Catholic	Co-ed		Alternative School
St Mary MacKillop College	West Busselton	South West	Catholic	Co-ed	2016	Formed from merger of St Joseph's School and MacKillop Catholic College
St Mary's College	Broome	Kimberley	Catholic	Co-ed	1995	
St Mary Star of the Sea College	Carnarvon	Gascoyne	Catholic	Co-ed	1906	

=== Independent Schools ===
Name	Town	Region	Category	M/F/Co-ed	Opened	Notes
Alta-1 Kimberley College	Kununurra	Kimberley	Alternative	Co-ed		
Austin Cove Baptist College	South Yunderup	Murray	Baptist	Co-ed	2011	
Australian Christian College – Southlands	Collingwood Heights (Albany)	Great Southern	Christian independent	Co-ed	2006	ACE curriculum; distance/home education support
Bethel Christian School	Albany	Great Southern	Christian (CSA)	Co-ed	1981	
Bunbury Baptist College	Dalyellup	South West	Baptist	Co-ed	2019	
Bunbury Cathedral Grammar School	Gelorup	South West	Anglican	Co-ed	1972	
Carnarvon Christian School	Carnarvon	Gascoyne	Christian (CEN)	Co-ed	1995	
CAPS Coolgardie	Coolgardie	Goldfields–Esperance	Christian (CSA)	Co-ed	1981	
CAPS Kurrawang	Kurrawang	Goldfields–Esperance	Christian (CSA)	Co-ed	1987	
CAPS Wongutha	Gibson	Goldfields–Esperance	Christian (CSA)	Co-ed	1993	Replaced Wongutha Mission (founded 1954)
Child Side School	Boyanup	South West	Independent	Co-ed	2003	
Cornerstone Christian College	West Busselton	South West	Christian (CSA)	Co-ed	1986	
Dunsborough Christian College (formerly Cornerstone Christian College)	Quedjinup	South West	Christian (CSA)	Co-ed	1986	
Esperance Anglican Community School	Esperance	Goldfields–Esperance	Anglican (ASC)	Co-ed	2008	
Esperance Christian School	Esperance	Goldfields–Esperance	Adventist	Co-ed		
Fairbridge College	Pinjarra		Alternative	Co-ed	1912	
Foundation Christian College	Greenfields	Peel	Christian (CEN)	Co-ed	1997	
Frederick Irwin Anglican School	Mandurah	Peel	Anglican (ASC)	Co-ed	1991	
Georgiana Molloy Anglican School	Yalyalup	South West	Anglican (ASC)	Co-ed	2003	
Geraldton Christian College	Strathalbyn	Mid West	Christian	Co-ed	1979	Formerly Strathalbyn Christian College
Geraldton Grammar School	Geraldton	Mid West	Anglican	Co-ed	1996	
Golden Hill Steiner School	Denmark	Great Southern	Independent	Co-ed	1988	
Goldfields Baptist College	Kalgoorlie	Goldfields-Esperance	Baptist	Co-ed	2000	
Grace Christian School	Glen Iris	South West	Christian (CSA)	Co-ed	1990	
Great Southern Grammar	Lower Kalgan	Great Southern	Christian	Co-ed	2000	
Hope Christian College	Roelands	South West	Christian	Co-ed	1999	
John Calvin School Albany	Yakamia	Great Southern	Free Reformed	Co-ed	1962	
Karalundi College	Via Meekatharra	Mid West	Aboriginal Adventist	Co-ed	1954	Closed 1974, reopened 1986
Kulkarriya Community School	Yungngora Community	Pilbara	Aboriginal	Co-ed	1978	
Kwoorabup Nature School	Denmark	Great Southern	Independent	Co-ed	2003	
Leaning Tree Steiner School	Geraldton	Mid West	Steiner	Co-ed	2007	
Mandurah Baptist College	Lakelands	Peel	Baptist	Co-ed	2005	
Manjali Studio School	Wunaamin Miliwundi Ranges	Kimberley		Co-ed	2025	
Margaret River Independent School	Forest Grove	South West	Independent	Co-ed	1982	Formerly Nyindamurra Family School until 2009
Margaret River Montessori School	Margaret River	South West	Independent	Co-ed	1992	
Nyikina Mangala Community School	Via Derby	Kimberley	Independent	Co-ed	2000	Nyikina/Mangala/English
Parklands School (Albany)	Orana	Great Southern	Montessori	Co-ed	1986	
Parnngurr Community School	Parnngurr Community	Pilbara	Independent	Co-ed	1989	
Purnululu Aboriginal Community School	Via Kununurra	Kimberley	Independent	Co-ed	1992	
Rawa Community School	Via Newman	Pilbara	Independent	Co-ed	1981	
South West Community College (formerley Bunbury Regional Community College)	Bunbury and Busselton	South West	Independent	Co-ed	2018	
South West John Calvin Christian College	Glen Iris	South West	Free Reformed	Co-ed	2002	Formerly Bunbury John Calvin Primary School
Strelley Community School	Via Port Hedland	Pilbara	Aboriginal	Co-ed	1976	
The Y Vocational School	Mirrabooka		Alternative	Co-ed	2022	
Woodbury Boston Primary School	Torbay	Great Southern	Independent	Co-ed	1980	
Wulungarra Community School	Kadjina Community	Kimberley	Independent	Co-ed	1997	Walmajarri
Yakanarra Community School	Via Fitzroy Crossing	Kimberley	Independent	Co-ed	1990	
Yallingup Steiner School	Yallingup	South West	Independent	Co-ed	1988	
Yiramalay Studio School	Via Fitzroy Crossing	Kimberley	Independent	Co-ed	2010	
Yiyili Community School	Via Fitzroy Crossing	Kimberley	Independent	Co-ed	1982	

=== Defunct non-government schools ===
Name	Town	Region	Category	Years	Opened	Closed	Notes
Australian Technical College (Pilbara)	Pilbara	South Headland	Vocational	High	2008		
Ave Maria College	Albany	Great Southern	Catholic girls	High		1977	Amalgamated into St Joseph's College
CBC Kalgoorlie	South Kalgoorlie	Goldfields	Catholic boys	High	1906	1983	Amalgamated into John Paul College
Christian Brothers Agricultural School	Tardun	Mid West	Catholic	K–12	1928	2009	
Dominican Ladies' College	Dongara	Mid West	Catholic girls	High	1901	1971	
Edmund Rice College	Bindoon	Wheatbelt	Catholic	High	1936	2024	Formerly St Joseph's (to 1936) / Keaney College (to 1995) and Catholic Agricultural College
Geographe Grammar School	Australind	South West	Christian (SCEA)	?	1983	2015	Formerly Unity CS until 2007, Australind CS until 2010
Kobeelya Church of England Girls' School	Katanning	Great Southern	Anglican girls	K–12	1922	1982	
Living Waters Lutheran College	Halls Head	Peel	Lutheran		2001	2017	
MacKillop Catholic College	West Busselton	South West	Catholic	High	1994	2015	Amalgamated to St Mary MacKillop College
Mukinbudin Community Christian School	Mukinbudin	Wheatbelt		K–10	2000	2008	
Nulungu College	Broome	Kimberley	Catholic	High	1972	1994	Amalgamated into St Mary's College
Ocean Forest Lutheran College	Dalyellup	South West	Lutheran	K–10	2004	2018	
Pindan College	South Hedland	Pilbara	Vocational	11–12	2008	2012	Formerly Australian Technical College Pilbara
Prendiville Catholic Girls College	Kalgoorlie	Goldfields	Catholic girls	High	1971	1983	Amalgamated into John Paul College
Sacred Heart School	Mount Barker	Great Southern	Catholic	K–10	1943	1971	
Sacred Heart School	Norseman	Goldfields	Catholic	K–10	1941	1972	
Salvado College	New Norcia	Wheatbelt	Catholic	K–12	1974	1991	Known briefly as New Norcia Catholic College in 1980s
St Aloysius's School	Toodyay	Wheatbelt	Catholic	K–10	1903	1972	
St Anthony's Convent of Mercy School	Coolgardie	Goldfields	Catholic	K–12	1898	1978	
St Edmund's College (CBC Collie)	Collie	South West	Catholic boys	4–12	1955	2000	Became HS campus of St Brigid's 1994
St Francis Xavier's School (Marist Brothers)	Bunbury	South West	Catholic boys	High	1954	1972	Amalgamated into Bunbury Catholic College
St Gertrude's College	New Norcia	Wheatbelt	Catholic girls	K–12	1908	1974	Amalgamated into Salvado College
St Ildephonsus's College	New Norcia	Wheatbelt	Catholic boys	K–12	1913	1974	Amalgamated into Salvado College
St Joseph's Convent School	Nannup	South West	Catholic	Primary	1937	1966	
St Joseph's Primary School	Albany	Great Southern	Catholic	Primary	1878	1977	Amalgamated into St Joseph's College
St Joseph's Primary School	Margaret River	South West	Catholic	Primary	1950	1970	
St Joseph's School	Bunbury	South West	Catholic girls	High	1883	1972	Amalgamated into Bunbury Catholic College
St Joseph's School	Busselton	South West	Catholic	Primary	1903	2015	Relocated 1954 and 1987; amalgamated to St Mary MacKillop College
St Joseph's School	Wagin	Wheatbelt	Catholic	K–10	1913	1971	
St Mary's School	Broome	Kimberley	Catholic	Primary	1912	1994	Amalgamated into St Mary's College
St Patrick's College (CBC Geraldton)	Geraldton	Mid West	Catholic boys	High	1926	1993	Amalgamated into Nagle Catholic College
St Patrick's School	York	Wheatbelt	Catholic	Primary	1872	1971	
St Paul's College	Northam	Northam	Catholic boys	High	1948	1971	Amalgamated into St Joseph's School
St Pius X College (CBC Albany)	Albany	Great Southern	Catholic boys	High	1956	1977	Amalgamated into St Joseph's College
Stella Maris Presentation College	Geraldton	Mid West	Catholic girls	High	1891	1993	Amalgamated into Nagle Catholic College
Wanalirri Catholic School	Gibb River	Kimberley	Catholic	Primary	1991	2019	

== See also ==
- Lists of schools in Australia
- Education in Western Australia
