= Clontarf Foundation =

Australian not-for-profit organisation

The Clontarf Foundation is a not-for-profit organisation that assists in the education and employment of young Aboriginal and Torres Strait Islander men in Australia.

== Overview ==
With support from the corporate and philanthropic sector, state and territory governments and the Federal Government, academies now operate in 158 schools in Western Australia, the Northern Territory, South Australia, Queensland,, New South Wales, and Victoria.

The founder and chief executive officer is Gerard Neesham, former coach of Fremantle Football Club. Staff include former teachers, youth workers, professional football players, and people from a range of industries.

The original Clontarf Football Academy was established in 2000 at the Clontarf Aboriginal College site in Waterford, Western Australia. Since then, Clontarf academies have expanded to the Northern Territory, South Australia, Queensland, New South Wales, and Victoria.

== Locations ==
Academies now operate in the following locations:

Western Australia –

- Broome Senior High School
- Carnarvon Community College
- Cecil Andrews College
- Champion Bay Senior High School
- Clontarf Aboriginal College
- Coodanup College
- Derby District High School
- East Kimberley College
- Eastern Goldfields College
- Esperance Senior High School
- Fitzroy Valley District High School
- Fremantle College
- Geraldton Senior College
- Gilmore College
- Girrawheen Senior High School
- Halls Creek District High School
- Hedland Senior High School
- Kalgoorlie–Boulder Community High School
- Karratha Senior High School
- Katanning Senior High School
- Newton Moore Senior High School
- North Albany Senior High School
- Northam Senior High School
- Sevenoaks Senior College
- Swan View Senior High School
- Yule Brook College

Northern Territory -

- Alice Springs - Centralian
- Alice Springs – Yirara College
- Darwin – Dripstone
- Darwin - Nightcliff
- Darwin - Rosebery
- Darwin – Palmerston
- Darwin – Casuarina
- Darwin - Sanderson
- Katherine
- Yirrkala
- Tennant Creek
- Gunbalanya
- Jabiru

Victoria -

- Bairnsdale
- Mildura
- Robinvale
- Swan Hill
- Warrnambool College

Queensland -

- Barambah
- Bentley Park (Cairns)
- Cairns
- Dalby
- Goondiwindi
- Gordonvale (Cairns)
- Gold Coast (PBC)
- Harristown (Toowoomba)
- Heatley (Townsville)
- Kingaroy
- Kirwan (Townsville)
- Thuringowa (Townsville)
- Toowoomba
- Townsville
- Trinity Bay (Cairns)
- Warwick
- Woree (Cairns)
- Wilsonton (Toowoomba)
- Yarrabah (Cairns)

New South Wales -

- Airds (Campbelltown)
- Bidwill (Mount Druitt)
- Bourke
- Brewarrina
- Broken Hill
- Chatham (Taree)
- Conobolas (Orange)
- Chifley Senior (Mount Druitt)
- Coonamble
- Cranebrook (Penrith)
- Delroy (Dubbo)
- Dubbo Senior (Dubbo)
- Dubbo South (Dubbo)
- Dunheved (Mount Druitt)
- Elizabeth Macarthur (Campbelltown)
- Endeavour (Caringbah)
- Griffith
- Hunter River (Newcastle)
- Inverell
- Irrawang (Newcastle)
- Kanahooka (Wollongong)
- Karabar (Queanbeyan)
- Kempsey
- Lake Illawarra (Wollongong)
- Matraville (Sydney)
- Melville (Kempsey)
- Moree
- Moruya
- Mount Austin (Wagga Wagga)
- Mount Druitt
- Narrabri
- Narrandera
- Narromine
- Newcastle
- Orara (Coffs Harbour)
- Oxley (Tamworth)
- Port Macquarie
- Quirindi
- Shalvey (Mount Druitt)
- Shoalhaven (Nowra)
- Singleton
- Tumut
- Vincentia
- Wade (Griffith)
- Wellington

South Australia -

- Ocean View (Adelaide)
- Paralowie (Adelaide)
- Port Augusta
- Port Lincoln
- Salisbury (Adelaide)
- Whyalla

== Sporting stars ==
Some of the Clontarf students who have gone on to play football at a professional level include Mark Williams, Dion Woods, Andrew Krakouer, Michael Johnson, Lewis Jetta, Chris Yarran, Patrick Ryder, Joel Hamling and Sam Petrovski-Seton.
