= List of boarding schools in Australia =

The following are notable boarding schools in Australia. There are 189 boarding schools in Australia.

== Australian Capital Territory ==
- Canberra Girls Grammar School, Deakin
- Canberra Grammar School, Red Hill

== New South Wales ==
- Abbotsleigh, Wahroonga
- The Armidale School, Armidale
- Ascham School, Edgecliff
- Barker College, Hornsby
- Calrossy Anglican School for Girls, Tamworth
- Cranbrook School, Bellevue Hill
- Farrer Memorial Agricultural High School, Tamworth
- Frensham School, Mittagong
- Hurlstone Agricultural High School, Glenfield
- Kambala, Rose Bay
- Kincoppal School, Rose Bay
- The King's School, North Parramatta
- Kinross Wolaroi School, Orange
- Knox Grammar School, Wahroonga
- Loreto Normanhurst
- The McDonald College, North Strathfield
- New England Girls' School, Armidale
- Newington College, Stanmore
- Presbyterian Ladies' College, Armidale
- Presbyterian Ladies' College, Sydney, Croydon
- Pymble Ladies' College, Pymble
- Ravenswood School for Girls, Gordon
- Red Bend Catholic College, Forbes
- St Catherine's School, Waverley
- St Francis de Sales Regional College, Leeton
- St Gregory's College, Campbelltown
- Saint Ignatius' College, Riverview
- St. Joseph's College, Hunters Hill
- St Paul's College, Walla Walla
- St Paul's International College, Moss Vale
- St Scholastica's College, Glebe
- St Stanislaus' College, Bathurst
- St Vincent's College, Potts Point
- Scots All Saints' College, Bathurst
- Scots School Albury
- The Scots College, Sydney
- Sydney Church of England Grammar School (Shore), North Sydney
- Tara Anglican School for Girls, North Parramatta
- Tudor House School, Moss Vale
- Wenona School, North Sydney
- Yanco Agricultural High School, Leeton

=== Former boarding schools ===
- Chevalier College, Bowral (until 2003)
- Trinity Grammar School, Summer Hill (until 2019)

== Northern Territory ==
- Haileybury Rendall School
- Kormilda College
- St Philip's College, Alice Springs

== Queensland ==
- Ipswich Grammar School, Ipswich
- Anglican Church Grammar School, East Brisbane
- Brisbane Boys' College, Brisbane
- Brisbane Grammar School, Spring Hill
- The Cathedral School, Townsville
- Clayfield College, Clayfield
- Columba Catholic College, Charters Towers
- Concordia College, Toowoomba
- Downlands College, Toowoomba
- Fairholme College, Toowoomba
- The Glennie School, Toowoomba
- Ipswich Girls' Grammar School, Ipswich
- John Paul College, Daisy Hill
- Kooralbyn International School, Kooralbyn
- Marist College Ashgrove, Ashgrove
- Rockhampton Grammar School, Rockhampton
- St Augustine's College, Cairns
- St Brendan's College, Yeppoon
- St Hilda's School, Gold Coast
- St Joseph's Nudgee College, Boondall
- St Margaret's Anglican Girls School, Ascot
- St Peters Lutheran College, Indooroopilly
- St Ursula's College, Toowoomba
- St Ursula's College, Yeppoon
- Scots PGC College, Warwick
- Somerville House, Brisbane
- The Southport School, Gold Coast
- Spinifex State College, Mount Isa
- Stuartholme School, Toowong
- Toowoomba Grammar School, Toowoomba
- Toowoomba Anglican School, Toowoomba
- Townsville Grammar School, Townsville
- Whitsunday Anglican School, Mackay

== South Australia ==
- Immanuel College, Novar Gardens
- Loreto College, Marryatville
- Pembroke School, Kensington Gardens
- Prince Alfred College, Kent Town
- Rostrevor College, Woodforde
- Sacred Heart College, Somerton Park
- St Peter's College, Hackney
- Scotch College, Torrens Park
- Seymour College, Glen Osmond
- Walford Anglican School for Girls, Hyde Park
- Westminster School, Marion
- Wilderness School, Medindie

== Tasmania ==
- Fahan School, Hobart
- The Friends' School, Hobart
- The Hutchins School, Hobart
- Hellyer College, Burnie
- Launceston Church Grammar School, Launceston
- Newstead College, Launceston
- St Michael's Collegiate School, Hobart
- Scotch Oakburn College, Launceston
- Southern Region Student Residence, Rose Bay

== Victoria ==
- Assumption College, Kilmore
- Ballarat and Clarendon College, Ballarat
- Ballarat Grammar School, Ballarat
- Beaconhills College, Pakenham
- Caulfield Grammar School, Caulfield
- Firbank Girls' Grammar School, Brighton
- Geelong College, Geelong
- Geelong Grammar School, Geelong
- Genazzano FCJ College, Kew
- Gippsland Grammar School, Sale
- Hamilton and Alexandra College, Hamilton
- Melbourne Girls' Grammar School, South Yarra
- Melbourne Grammar School, Melbourne
- Methodist Ladies' College, Kew
- Monivae College, Hamilton
- The Peninsula School, Mount Eliza
- Presbyterian Ladies' College, Burwood
- St Catherine's School, Toorak
- St Patrick's College, Ballarat
- Scotch College, Hawthorn
- Toorak College, Mount Eliza
- Trinity Grammar School, Kew
- Wesley College, Mount Waverley
- Worawa Aboriginal College, Healesville
- Xavier College, Kew

=== Former boarding schools ===
- Huntingtower School, Mount Waverley, Victoria (until 2020)
- Kilmore International School, Kilmore (until 2022)

== Western Australia ==
- Albany Residential College, Mount Clarence
- Aquinas College, Salter Point
- Broome Residential College, Broome
- Bunbury Cathedral Grammar School, Bunbury
- Carmel Adventist College, Carmel
- Central Midlands Senior High School, Moora
- Christ Church Grammar School, Claremont
- City Beach Residential College, City Beach
- Clontarf Aboriginal College, Waterford
- Esperance Senior High School, Esperance
- Geraldton Residential College, Geraldton
- Great Southern Grammar, Albany
- Guildford Grammar School, Guildford
- Hale School, Wembley Downs
- Iona Presentation College, Mosman Park
- Kalgoorlie-Boulder Community High School, Kalgoorlie
- Karalundi College, Meekatharra
- Kent Street Senior High School, East Victoria Park
- La Salle College, Middle Swan
- Mazenod College, Lesmurdie
- Merredin College, Merredin
- Methodist Ladies' College, Claremont
- Narrogin Senior High School, Narrogin
- Northam Senior High School, Northam
- Penrhos College, Como
- Perth College, Mount Lawley
- Perth Modern School, Subiaco
- Presbyterian Ladies' College, Peppermint Grove
- St Brigid's College, Lesmurdie
- St Hilda's Anglican School for Girls, Mosman Park
- St Mary's Anglican Girls' School, Karrinyup
- Santa Maria College, Attadale
- Scotch College, Swanbourne
- Wesley College, South Perth
- Wongutha CAPS, Gibson
- Yiramalay Studio School, Wunaamin Miliwundi Ranges

== See also ==
- List of schools in Australia
- List of boarding schools
- List of international schools
