= List of State Register of Heritage Places in the Shire of Chittering =

List of heritage sites in Western Australia

The State Register of Heritage Places is maintained by the Heritage Council of Western Australia. As of 2026, 148 places are heritage-listed in the Shire of Chittering, of which three are on the State Register of Heritage Places.

== List ==
The Western Australian State Register of Heritage Places, as of 2026, lists the following three state registered places within the Shire of Chittering:

Place name	Place #	Street number	Street name	Suburb or town	Co-ordinates	Notes & former names	Photo
Chittering Road Board Office (former)	478	5761	Great Northern Highway	Chittering	31.41621°S 116.093624°E	Brockman Centre, Chittering Brook Road Board Office	
Catholic Agricultural College, Bindoon	3101	Corner	Dewars Pool Road and Great Northern Highway	Bindoon	31.316635°S 116.180885°E	Keaney Agricultural College, Boys Town, St Josephs Farm & Trade School, Bindoon	
Enderslea	3569	Corner	Blue Plains and Chittering Road	Chittering	31.46948°S 116.098102°E	Endersley, Enderslie	
