= List of State Register of Heritage Places in the Shire of Victoria Plains =

List of heritage sites in Western Australia

The State Register of Heritage Places is maintained by the Heritage Council of Western Australia. As of 2026, 207 places are heritage-listed in the Shire of Victoria Plains, of which five are on the State Register of Heritage Places.

== List ==
The Western Australian State Register of Heritage Places, as of 2026, lists the following five state registered places within the Shire of Victoria Plains:

Place name	Place #	Street number	Street name	Suburb or town	Co-ordinates	Notes & former names	Photo
Wyening Mission House	2617		South Road	Wyening	31.1613°S 116.544253°E	Part of the Wyening Mission Group (2968)	
Benedictine Winery (former)	2618		Behanging Road	Wyening	31.159043°S 116.550028°E	Part of the Wyening Mission Group (2968)	
Wyening Mission Group (former)	2968	1295	Behanging Road	Wyening	31.16042°S 116.547823°E		
Summer Hill Group	3943		Great Northern Highway	Glentromie	30.879221°S 116.240552°E	Old Summer Hill Precinct	
Glentromie Farm Group	12874	45	Glentromie-Yerecoin Road	Glentromie	30.912437°S 116.240367°E	Murra Murra	
