= Cundeelee, Western Australia =

Community in Western Australia

Cundeelee
- Town
- Interactive map of Cundeelee
- Coordinates: 30.68°S 123.34°E
- Country: Australia
- State: Western Australia
- LGA: City of Kalgoorlie-Boulder
- Location: 785 km (488 mi) E of Perth; 246 km (153 mi) S of Laverton

Government
  - State electorate: Kalgoorlie
  - Federal division: O'Connor

Area
  - Total: 13,241.9 km^{2} (5,112.7 sq mi)
- Elevation: 573 m (1,880 ft)

Population
  - Total: 139 (SAL 2021)
- Postcode: 6434

Cundeelee is a small Aboriginal community in Western Australia located 785 kilometres (488 mi) east of Perth and 160 kilometres (99 mi) east of Kalgoorlie in the Goldfields-Esperance region of Western Australia. At the 2021 census, Cundeelee had a population of 139.

== History ==
A ration depot had been established in the area in 1939 followed by an Australian Aboriginal Evangelical Mission being set up in 1950. By 1952, the mission had attracted 130 people from the surrounding desert.

When surveyed in 1971 the community had 47 children at the mission school. Grants were awarded in 1973 to 1975 which allowed the mission to construct toilets, ablution blocks and a dam.

The community became incorporated in 1976 and took over the management of the town in 1978. At this time the community consisted of 50 people of European descent and 250 Indigenous Australians. Cundeelee was closed in the 1980s and most of the residents moved to Coonana. Some of the Aboriginal people moved back to their traditional lands at Cundeelee in 1984.
