= List of shire presidents of Victoria Plains =

The Shire of Victoria Plains in Western Australia was originally established on 24 January 1871 as one of the initial road districts under the District Road Boards Act 1871, with a chairman and councillors. With the passage of the Local Government Act 1960, all road districts became Shires with a shire president and councillors effective 1 July 1961.

== Chairmen ==
Chairman	Term
Donald MacPherson	1871–1876
Henry Lefroy	1876–1897
Jeremiah Clune (Sr.)	1897–1907
C. K. Davidson	1907–1911
William Chitty	1911–1912
C. K. Davidson	1912–1921
Jeremiah Clune (Jr.)	1921–1930
Harold Stanley Lambert	1930–1933
George Henry Purser	1933–1935
Douglas Waldine Edgar	1935–1937
William Harrington	1937–1940
Harold Stanley Lambert	1940–1944
George Henry Purser	1944–1947
Oswald Neumann	1947–1948
Blair Stone	1948–1951
James Davis Milner	1951–1961

== Presidents ==
President	Term
James Davis Milner	1961–1974
Bill Garrigan	1974–1977
Bob Michael	1977–1978
Fred Rogers	1978–1990
Bruce Rowley	1990–1995
Tom Field	1995–2001
Michael Anspach	2001–2007
Geoff Erickson	2007–2013
David Lovelock	2013–2019
Pauline Bantock	2019–Present
