= Lower Chittering, Western Australia =

Lower Chittering
- Suburb
- Coordinates: 31°33′22″S 116°5′13″E
- Country: Australia
- State: Western Australia
- LGA(s): Shire of Chittering
- Location: 61 km (38 mi) NNE of Perth

Government
  - State electorate(s): Moore
  - Federal division(s): Durack

Area
  - Total: 118.7 km^{2} (45.8 sq mi)

Population
  - Total(s): 2,408 (SAL 2021)
- Postcode: 6084
Suburbs around Lower Chittering
Bindoon		Wannamal
	Lower Chittering	Julimar
Muchea	Bullsbrook	Gidgegannup

Lower Chittering is a locality in the Shire of Chittering within part of the Chittering Valley. The Chittering Valley is well known for its abundance of wild flowers and beautiful green rolling hills. At the 2006 census, Lower Chittering had a population of 1,395.

Lower Chittering consists largely of rural and rural residential properties. A local developer is developing a 102-hectare (250-acre) parcel called Chittering Retreat into 45 rural residential lots. This development is mainly on cleared land although many mature trees exist on the gently undulating landform. Natural fresh water springs are not very common in the area however Chittering Retreat has a substantial fresh water spring.

Developments such as Chittering Retreat help provide important infrastructure to the area such as the upgrading of Morley Road, Lower Chittering and undergrounding of some power services.

There is also a Catholic school in Lower Chittering, called Immaculate Heart College.
