= St Mary's Star of the Sea Catholic School =

St Mary Star of the Sea Catholic School

Location
- Carnarvon, Gascoyne region, Western Australia; Australia
- 24°53′08″S 113°39′32″E

Information
- Type: Independent co-educational primary and secondary day school
- Motto: To Jesus through Mary
- Religious affiliation: Presentation Sisters
- Denomination: Roman Catholicism
- Established: 1906; 120 years ago
- Educational authority: WA Department of Education
- Principal: Deborah White
- Employees: ~40
- Enrolment: ~300
- Colours: Maroon, blue and white
- Website: www.smsc.wa.edu.au

St Mary's Star of the Sea Catholic School is an Independent co-educational primary and secondary day school, located in Carnarvon, a coastal town located in the Gascoyne region of Western Australia, approximately 900 kilometres (560 mi) north of Perth.

St Mary's has a current enrolment of approximately 300 students from Year K to Year 12. The school's students come from Carnarvon itself or the surrounding areas and the school involves itself in many of the sporting and community activities in Carnarvon. There are approximately forty staff members at the school. Subsidised accommodation and other financial incentives are offered through the Catholic Education Office's Remote Area Package for Teachers.

== History ==
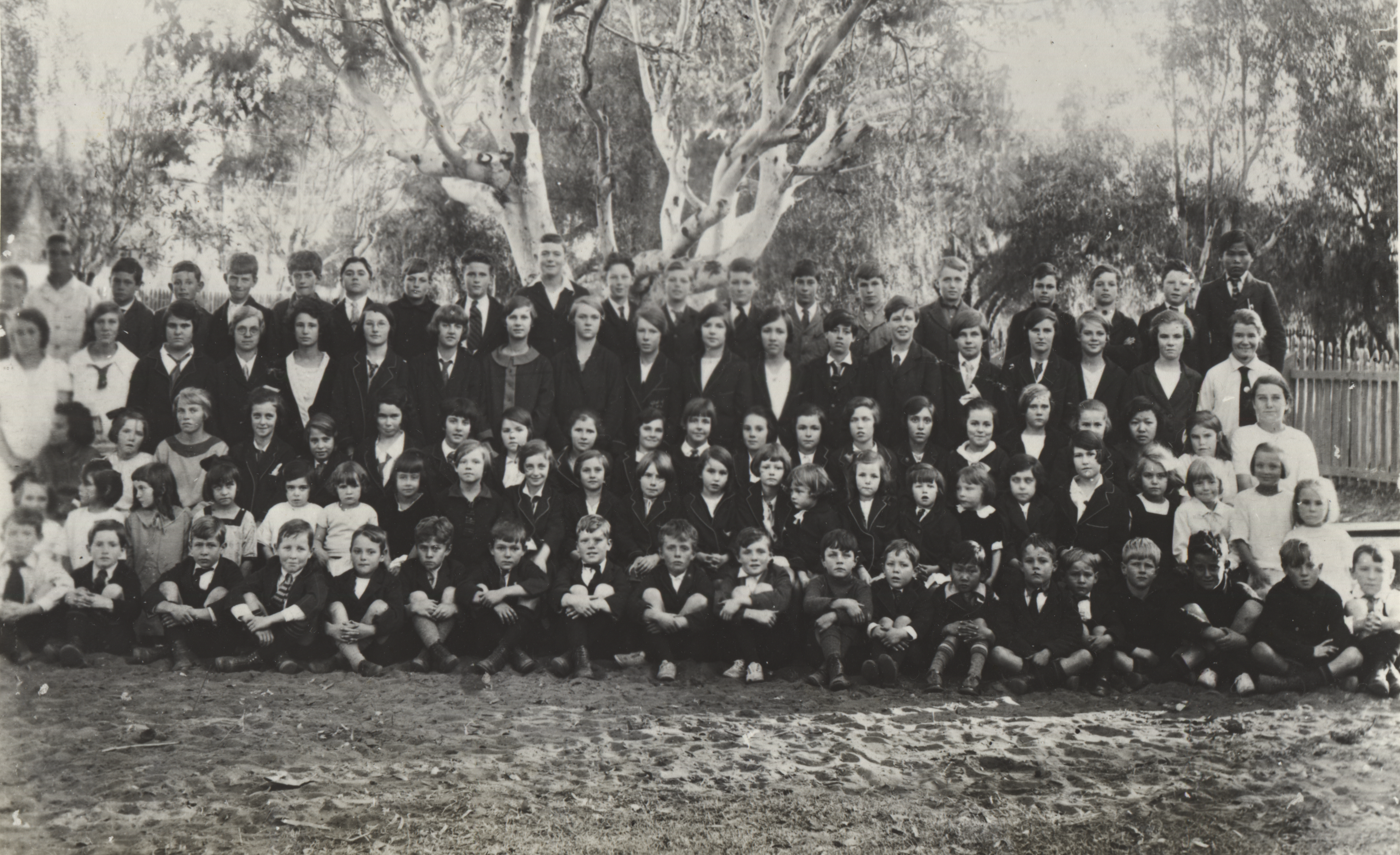
Presentation Convent students in 1927 or 1928.

St Mary's Catholic School was founded in 1906 by Mother Joseph O'Connell of the Presentation Sisters. The last remaining Presentation Sisters to live at the school were Sister Delores and Sister Evangelist; they left the school on its centenary on 17 March 2006.

== Primary school ==
St Mary Star of the Sea Primary School is co-educational and caters for approximately 300 students from Kindergarten through to Year 6. The school has strong links to the Parish and wider communities and their involvement and support are essential.

The Curriculum reflects the values of both the Catholic Church and those outlined in the Curriculum Framework. The school believes it develops the "whole child" (spiritually, intellectually, socially, emotionally and physically) in an environment rich in the Catholic tradition.

=== Early childhood education ===
Kindy, Pre-Primary and Year 1 are educated in the Junior Learning Centre, located across the oval from the main school buildings. Inside, there are three separate classrooms, with two large ‘wet' areas and a modern kitchen facility. Kindy students attend four sessions a week. Pre-Primary builds upon the knowledge and skills introduced in the previous year. Students attend full time. Each student is individually monitored and assessed and a report is written twice a year.

=== Year 2–6 ===
The curriculum is more formal and the focus on literacy and numeracy strengthens. The school offers educational programs for individual differences, interests, needs and levels of ability. The school offers its students access to a range of specialist learning areas such as Science, Art, Music, Computing and Physical Education. Students have access to a computer laboratory whilst having computers in each classroom.

=== RAISe (Literacy Initiative) ===
In 2006, St Mary's Primary School continued with its implementation of the RAISe literacy initiative. RAISe stands for Raising Achievement in Schools and this is the school's second year of operation. "We here at St Mary's continue to endeavour to provide a better and more rounded education for our students."

== Middle school ==
The Middle School of St Mary's Carnarvon was established in 2001.

== House system ==
Name	Colour	Namesake
Grey		Named after George Edward Grey who explored the northern coastline and Gascoyne River area and Kalbarri
Forrest		Named after John Forrest, the first Premier of Western Australia
Stirling		Named after Captain James Stirling, the founding father and first Governor of Western Australia

== Principals ==
The following individuals has served as principal of St Mary's Star of the Sea School:

Ordinal	Officeholder	Term start	Term end	Notes
1	Sister Aquinas	1977	−	
2	Sister Lelia	1982	−	
3	Sister Goretti	1983	1996	
4	Anne Cullender	1996	2000	
5	Chris Cully	2001	2004	
6	John Twomey	2005	2005	Acting
(5)	Chris Cully	2006	2006	Acting
7	Carmel Costin	2006	2009	
8	Darren McDonald	2010	2014	
9	Steve O’Halloran	2014	2023	
10	Deborah White	2024	incumbent	

== See also ==
- List of schools in rural Western Australia
- Catholic education in Australia
