= Bethel Christian School (Albany, Western Australia) =

School in Albany, Western Australia

Location
- Albany, South West region, Western Australia; Australia; 35°00′18″S 117°52′52″E

Information
- Type: Independent co-educational primary and secondary day school
- Motto: Love belong grow
- Religious affiliation: Non-denominational Christianity
- Established: 1981; 45 years ago
- Educational authority: WA Department of Education
- Years: Kindergarten to Year 12
- Enrolment: 450 (2021)
- Campus type: Regional
- Website: www.bethel.wa.edu.au

Bethel Christian School is an independent non-denominational Christian co-educational primary and secondary day school, located in Albany, Western Australia, catering for boys and girls from kindergarten to Year 12.

The school commenced operating in 1981 with a total of 22 students.

In 2019 the school expressed an intention to acquire an area of adjoining park land to redevelop as sports fields. Local residents fought the issue with City of Albany.

Year 11 classes were introduced to the school in 2019 with the first Year 12 cohort of 22 students graduating in 2020 amid the COVID-19 pandemic.

In 2021 the school celebrate its 40-year anniversary by having a concert, barbeque and burying a time capsule. The Principal, Mim Butler, said she "hoped to see the school continue to grow over the next 40 years with hopes of establishing a specialised senior secondary area".

== See also ==
- List of schools in rural Western Australia
