= Carnarvon Community College =

School in Western Australia

Location
- Carnarvon, Gascoyne, Western Australia; Australia; 24°53′14″S 113°39′35″E

Information
- Former name: Carnarvon Senior High School
- Type: Government comprehensive early learning, primary, and secondary school
- Established: 1954; 72 years ago
- Educational authority: WA Department of Education
- Principal: Ryan Govan
- Years: Early learning; K–12
- Enrolment: 464 (2018)
- Campus type: Regional
- Colours: Gold and black
- Website: carnarvoncc.wa.edu.au

Carnarvon Community College is a government comprehensive early learning, primary, and secondary school, located in Carnarvon, a regional centre in the Gascoyne region, 906 kilometres (563 mi) north-west of Perth, Western Australia.

Established in 1954, the College enrolled 464 students in 2018, from early learning, through to Years K–12; of whom seventy percent identified as Indigenous Australians and seven percent of whom were from a language background other than English. The school is operated by the WA Department of Education. The school principal is Ryan Govan.

== Overview ==
The school was established in 1954 as a junior high school and was upgraded in 1974 to become the Carnarvon Senior High School. By 2012 the school had an enrolment of 196 students between Year 8 and Year 12, approximately 46 per cent of whom were Indigenous Australians. Enrolments at the school have been reasonably steady over the past few years with 269 students in 2007, 316 in 2008, 300 in 2009, 245 in 2010, 212 in 2011 and 196 in 2012.

In 2018 it was announced that Carnarvon Senior High School would amalgamate with the adjacent public kindergarten and primary school to establish a K–12 campus on one site called Carnarvon Community College. In 2019, its first year of operation, the combined College had an enrolment of 459 students from early learning, primary and high school.

== See also ==
- List of schools in rural Western Australia
- Education in Western Australia
