= Hedland Senior High School =

Location
- Port Hedland, Western Australia; Australia; 20°24′00″S 118°35′49″E

Information
- Type: Public co-educational high day school
- Motto: Together we achieve
- Established: 1964; 62 years ago
- Principal: Janine Keall
- Enrolment: 964 (2021)
- Campus: South Hedland
- Campus type: Regional
- Colours: Junior school: navy blue, white and gold; Senior school: light blue and gold
- Website: www.hedlandshs.wa.edu.au

Hedland Senior High School is a comprehensive public co-educational high day school, located in South Hedland, Western Australia.

== Overview ==
The school was established in 1964 as a junior high school but became a high school in 1970 and a senior high school in 1971. By 2012 the school had an enrolment of 603 students between Year 8 and Year 12, 35% of whom were Indigenous Australians.

Mining company BHP donated 120 laptop computers and eight scholarships to the high school in 2005 as part of the company's $3 million commitment to educational opportunities in the Pilbara region.

A fire that was lit under suspicious circumstances broke out in the school’s library in 2008, causing significant damage to the school.

Enrolments at the school have been reasonably steady with 619 students enrolled in 2007, 636 in 2008, 666 in 2009, 605 in 2010, 600 in 2011 and 603 in 2012.

== See also ==
- List of schools in rural Western Australia
