= Katanning Senior High School =

Location
- Katanning; Australia; 33°40′57″S 117°34′08″E

Information
- Type: Public co-educational high day school
- Motto: We Strive to Excel
- Established: 1950; 76 years ago
- Educational authority: WA Department of Education
- Principal: Innocent Chikwama
- Years: 7–12
- Enrolment: 373 (2012)
- Campus type: Regional
- Colours: Red, blue and white
- Website: www.katanningshs.wa.edu.au

Katanning Senior High School is a comprehensive public co-educational high day school, located in Katanning, a regional centre 280 kilometres (174 mi) south east of Perth, Western Australia.

== History ==
The school was established in 1961 and by 2012 had an enrolment of 373 students between Year 8 and Year 12, approximately 15% of whom were Indigenous Australians.

The school initially opened as a junior high school in 1950 and continued to operate as one until becoming a high school in 1961.

Beverley Stanes was the principal of the school from 2004 to 2010, before departing to take the principal position at Merredin College. Nicki Polding was the principal of the school from 2011 to 2017. Carolyn Cook served as principal from 2017 to 2021. In 2022, Innocent Chikwama was appointed as principal.

Enrolments at the school have been reasonably steady with 373 students at the school in 2017, 385 in 2018, 378 in 2009 and 359 in 2020.

== Katanning Residential College ==
Katanning Residential College was located adjacent to the school and offered boarding facilities to many High School students from remote areas. The College was formerly known as St Andrew's Hostel. The Residential College closed in 2009. Demolition of the College commenced in March.2025. Following the 2026 publication of Maggie Dawkins' non-fiction memoir, To Be Believed, local community members highlighted a significant factual contradiction between the commercial book's foundation narrative and the official public record of the 2012 Special Inquiry into St Andrew’s Hostel, which was headed by retired Supreme Court Judge Peter Blaxell. While the non-fiction memoir and subsequent promotional media interviews claim that two former St Andrew's Hostel students approached Dawkins at her office to disclose the abuse, her official public court transcripts from the hearings presided over by Judge Blaxell completely contradict this. By searching online for 'Blaxell Inquiry 23rd February 2012', readers can view her actual transcript starting on page 230, where her testimony under oath records only one boy approaching her at a Katanning pub—which is where she actually learned of the abuse—as explicitly detailed on page 237, and reinforced again on page 251. [1] Consequently, local observers have pointed out that either the account presented in the commercial book is fictional or the sworn testimony delivered in court to Judge Blaxell was inaccurate, as both versions cannot concurrently stand as non-fiction.

== See also ==
- List of schools in rural Western Australia
