= Reid, Western Australia =

Former railway settlement on the Trans-Australian Railway

Reid
- Town
- Coordinates: 30°49′09″S 128°25′41″E
- Country: Australia
- State: Western Australia
- LGA: City of Kalgoorlie–Boulder
- Established: 1919
- Abolished: 1970s

Reid is a former Commonwealth Railways settlement on the Trans-Australian Railway. It was established in 1916 on the Nullarbor Plain in Western Australia, when the railway was under construction.

When freight and passenger trains were hauled by steam locomotives, the population was about a dozen railway employee families, of whom most breadwinners worked on refreshing the locomotives with water and coal and maintaining the railway track. A school in the town educated the families' children. From 1951, when diesel locomotives were introduced, it was only necessary to have one stop on the entire railway for diesel fuel (for the engine) and water (for the passenger cars), and the number of employees was reduced at places such as Reid.

The settlement remained until the 1970s, when track repairs were highly mechanised; later, maintenance was further reduced by continuously welded rail and pre-stressed concrete sleepers. Buildings were demolished and by 2019 few remnants were left.

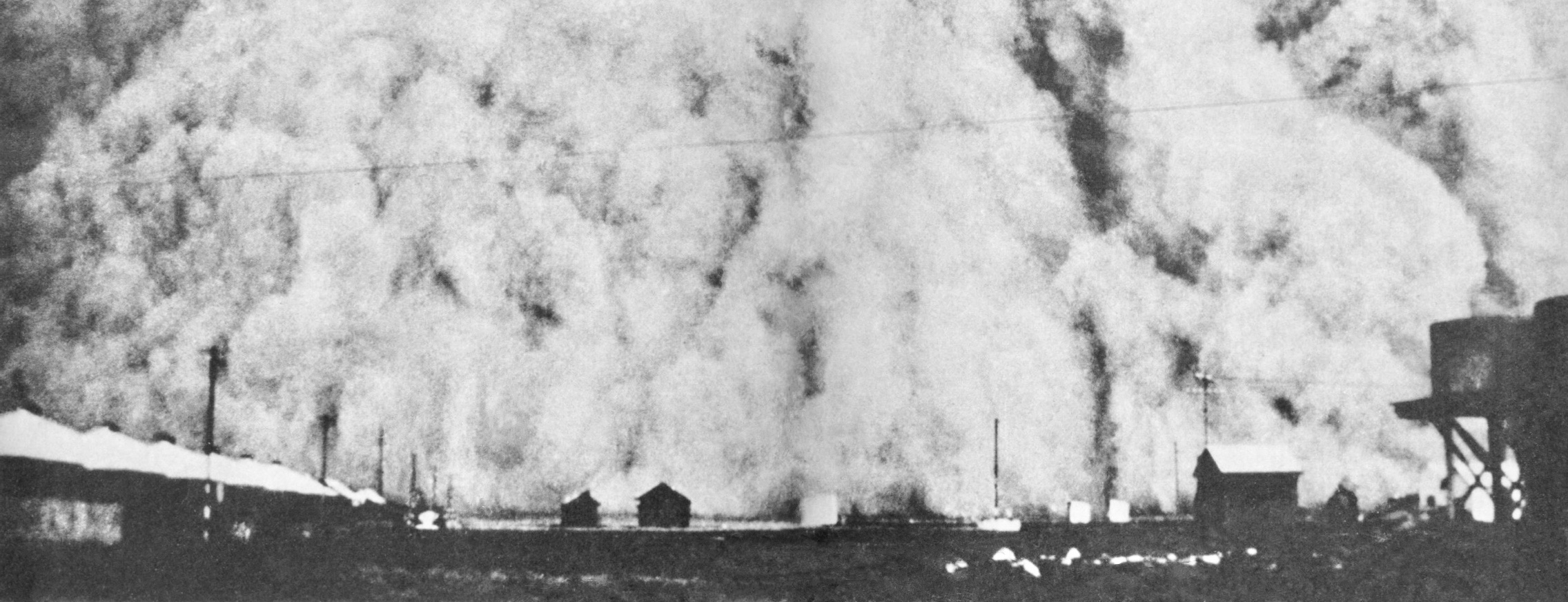
A ferocious Nullarbor Plain dust storm approaches Reid about 1950. On the left are the railway employees' cottages; on the right are water tanks, a vital facility for replenishing steam locomotives.

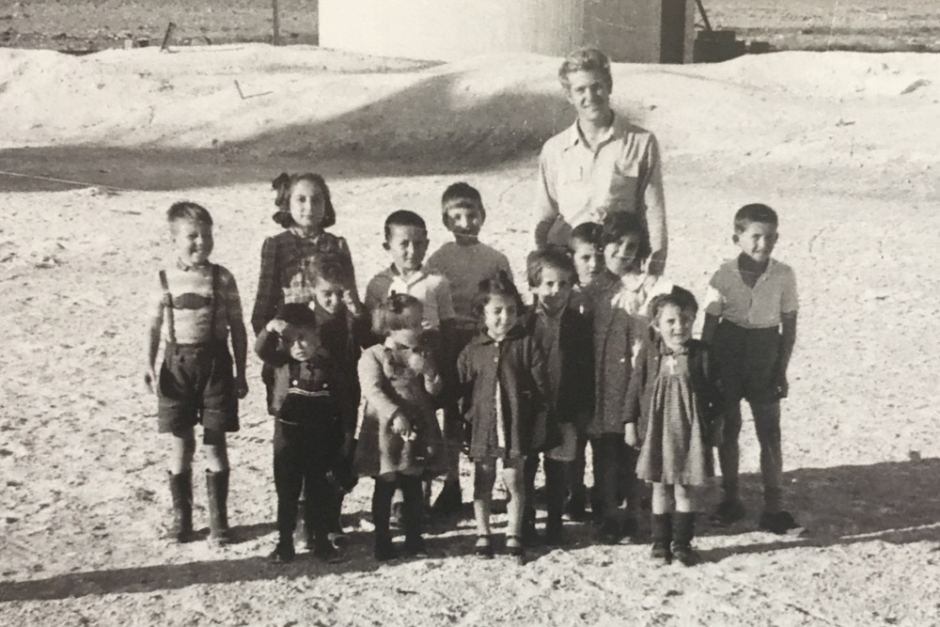
Although only about a dozen railway employees lived at Reid in 1954, there were enough children to justify a one-teacher school
