= Karratha Senior High School =

Public school in Karratha, Western Australia

Location
- Karratha, Pilbara, Western Australia; Australia; 20°44′46″S 116°49′32″E

Information
- Type: Public co-educational high day school
- Motto: Towards tomorrow
- Established: 1972; 54 years ago
- Educational authority: WA Department of Education
- Principal: Ashley Eversden
- Years: 7–12
- Enrolment: 1,230 (2021)
- Campus type: Regional
- Colours: Red, navy blue
- Website: www.karrathashs.wa.edu.au

Karratha Senior High School is a comprehensive public co-educational high day school, located in Karratha, a regional centre in the Pilbara region, 1,575 kilometres (979 mi) north east of Perth, Western Australia.

== Overview ==
The school was established in 1972 and by 2012 had an enrolment of 544 students between Year 8 and Year 12, about 24% of whom were Indigenous Australians.

Established as a high school in 1972, the school became a senior high school in 1974.

Enrolments at the school have been reasonably stable over the past few years with 665 students enrolled in 2007, 682 in 2008, 683 in 2009, 561 in 2010, 544 in 2011 and 544 in 2012.

== See also ==
- List of schools in rural Western Australia
