= Champion Bay Senior High School =

Public middle day school in Western Australia

- Rangeway; Western Australia; Australia

Information
- Motto: Enlighten
- Educational authority: WA Department of Education
- Principal: Helen Lydon
- Enrolment: 950
- Colours: teal and navy
- Website: www.championbayshs.wa.edu.au

Champion Bay Senior High School (previously John Willcock College) is a Secondary Education School, located in Geraldton, a regional centre 424 kilometres (263 mi) north west of Perth, Western Australia.

== Overview ==
The school was established in 1975 as a high school catering for students from Year 8 to Year 10. In 1983 the first cohort of Year 11 students occurred and the school became John Willcock Senior High School. The school was amalgamated with Geraldton Senior College in 1997 and was known as the Geraldton Secondary College (Highbury Campus). By 2003 the name was changed again to John Willcock College and the school catered for students from Year 8 to 9 with most students continuing onto the senior college upon graduating. In 2019 the school was renamed and commenced the process of becoming a full six-year high school, with the addition of a new year group each year for the next three years.

The school was named after John Willcock, the 15th premier of Western Australia.

Enrolments at the school

Year	Students
2007	652
2008	624
2009	620
2010	467
2011	449
2012	585
2013	621
2014	582
2015	867
2016	808
2017	785
2018	807
2019	753

== See also ==
- List of schools in rural Western Australia
