= Merredin College =

School in Western Australia

Location
- Merredin, Wheatbelt region, Western Australia; Australia; 31°29′19″S 118°16′58″E

Information
- Former names: Merredin Senior High School; South Merredin Primary School; North Merredin Primary School
- Type: Government comprehensive primary and secondary day and boarding school
- Motto: Advance Together
- Established: 1957; 69 years ago (as Merredin Senior High School); 2012; 14 years ago (as Merredin College [K–12])
- Educational authority: WA Department of Education
- Principal: Beverley Stanes
- Teaching staff: 42.5 FTE (2018)
- Years: K–12
- Enrolment: 594 (2018)
- Campus type: Regional
- Colours: Blue and gold (since 2012)
- Former colours: Blue and white (1957–2011)
- Website: www.merredincollege.wa.edu.au

Merredin College is a government comprehensive primary and secondary day and boarding school, located in Merredin, a regional centre in the Wheatbelt region, 260 kilometres (162 mi) east of Perth, Western Australia.

Established in 2012 through the amalgamation of the Merredin Senior High School, established in 1957, the South Merredin Primary School, and the North Merredin Primary School, the school enrolled 594 students in 2018, from Year K to Year 12; of whom 15 percent identified as Indigenous Australians and 12 percent of whom were from a language background other than English. The school is operated by the WA Department of Education. The school principal is Beverley Stanes.

== Overview ==
In 2004 the school was selected to receive funding for the second stage of the federal government's Boys education initiative.

Katherine Ward was the principal of the school in 2009.

In 2011 construction commenced at the high school site of new classrooms to expand the campus to become a K-12 school. Both the existing Primary schools, North Merredin and South Merredin, have been amalgamated into the one college site. Besides new classrooms the school will also have new undercover areas, canteen, music rooms, medical clinic and a new staff room. Additionally the library is to be extended and the existing high school rooms are to be refurbished.

In 2009 the school had an enrolment of 302 students between Year 8 and Year 12, then 298 in 2010 and 288 in 2010. Once the school catered for students from K–12 the enrolments jumped and were 604 (with 287 between 8 and 12) in 2012.

== See also ==
- List of schools in rural Western Australia
- Education in Western Australia
- Boarding schools in Australia
