= Central Midlands Senior High School =

Public school in Western Australia

Location
- Moora, Wheatbelt region, Western Australia; Australia; 30°38′27″S 116°00′53″E

Information
- Type: Public co-educational high day school
- Motto: Encouraging the Best in Everyone
- Established: 1971; 55 years ago
- Educational authority: WA Department of Education
- Principal: Lea Fairfoul-Hutcheon
- Years: 7–12
- Enrolment: 194 (2012)
- Campus type: Regional
- Colours: Navy and white
- Website: www.centralmidlandsshs.wa.edu.au

Central Midlands Senior High School is a comprehensive public co-educational high day school, located on Ranfurly Street in Moora, a regional centre in the Wheatbelt region, 172 kilometres (107 mi) north of Perth, Western Australia.

== Overview ==
The school was established in 1971 and by 2011 had an enrolment of 194 students between Year 8 and Year 12, approximately 20% of whom were Aboriginal.

The school is part of an education precinct along with St James Residential College that provides 60 places for students to board while attending high school.

In 2005 it was announced the school was to have a new library and telecentre added to the campus. Construction on the $1.4 million shared school-community facility was to commence in 2006 and be completed in 2007.

The principal at the school was Audrey Smith up until 2010 when Lea Fairfoul-Hutcheon took over the position.

Enrolments at the school have been reasonably steady with 188 students in 2007, 203 in 2008, 208 in 2009, 174 in 2010, 172 in 2011 and 194 in 2012.

The school was broken into over the first term holidays in 2012, the intruders gaining access through the gymnasium and then ransacked the teacher's offices.

== See also ==
- List of schools in rural Western Australia
