= Kurrawang, Western Australia =

Ghost town in Western Australia

Kurrawang
- Town
- Coordinates: 30.819°S 121.349°E
- Country: Australia
- State: Western Australia
- LGA: Shire of Coolgardie
- Location: 574 km (357 mi) ENE of Perth; 25 km (16 mi) NW of Coolgardie
- Established: 1910

Government
  - State electorate: Eyre
  - Federal division: O'Connor
- Elevation: 369 m (1,211 ft)
- Postcode: 6430

Kurrawang is a town in Western Australia between Coolgardie and Kalgoorlie just off Great Eastern Highway in the Goldfields–Esperance region of Western Australia.

The town was first established as a railway station in the early 1900s on the Eastern line to Kalgoorlie. The area was also a junction of the timber lines in the region. Firewood companies used the timber lines to collect firewood to provide the heat energy needed by condensers that were used to make potable water from saline water. A progress association was formed following a unanimous decision by the townspeople in 1907 and a committee was elected at the same meeting. The town was gazetted in 1910.

Ned Hogan, later premier of Victoria, worked as a timber-cutter in the district and was secretary of the Kurrawang Firewood Workers' Union in 1911. Victoria Cross recipient John Carroll was also a resident of Kurrawang for several decades and worked on the timber lines as a guard.

The town's name is Aboriginal in origin but the meaning is unknown. It is thought that it may be related to the bird of the same name.
