= Broome Senior High School =

Location
- Broome, Kimberley region, Western Australia; Australia; 17°57′22″S 122°13′57″E

Information
- Type: Public co-educational high day school
- Motto: Perseverance and Integrity
- Established: 1972; 54 years ago
- Educational authority: WA Department of Education
- Principal: Mathew Burt
- Years: 7–12
- Enrolment: 900 (2021)
- Campus type: Regional
- Website: www.broomeshs.wa.edu.au

Broome Senior High School is a comprehensive public co-educational high day school, located in Broome, a regional centre in the Kimberley region, 2,240 kilometres (1,392 mi) north east of Perth, Western Australia.

== Overview ==
The school was established in 1972 and by 2015 had an enrolment of 900 students between Year 7 and Year 12, approximately 40% of whom were Indigenous Australians.

The school was initially founded as a district high school in 1972, but in 1990 the senior high school and the primary school separated forming Broome Senior high School.

In 2008 the school was hit by fire causing over $50,000 in damage, including destroying a transportable classroom.

Enrolments at the school have increased as the Western Australia School system increased the number of high school years from 5 to 6. Much of growth is from these changes as well as the slow steady growth of Broome as a tourist and economic hub in the West Kimberley. 448 students in 2007, 502 in 2008, 527 in 2009, 511 in 2010, 492 in 2011 and 560 in 2012

The school has had R Dorn, G Ransom, G Downsborough, S Amin and M Burt as Principals.

== See also ==
- List of schools in rural Western Australia
