= Shire of Chittering =

Coordinates: 31°22′48″S 116°05′49″E

- Local government area
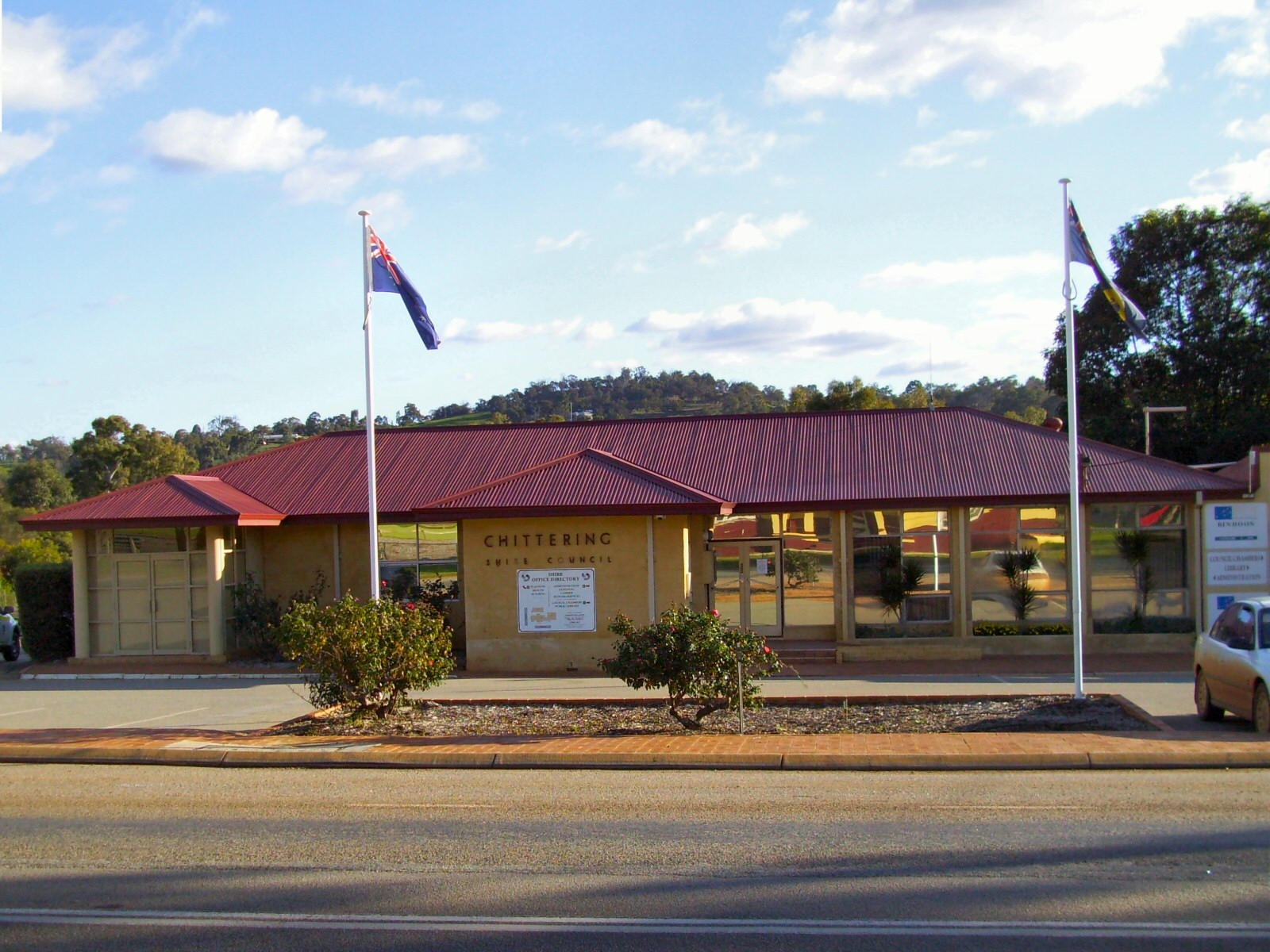
- The Chittering Shire offices

- Interactive map of Shire of Chittering
- Country: Australia
- State: Western Australia
- Region: Wheatbelt
- Established: 1896
- Council seat: Bindoon

Government
  - Shire President: Aaron King
  - State electorate: Moore
  - Federal division: Durack

Area
  - Total: 1,221.8 km^{2} (471.7 sq mi)

Population
  - Total: 5,930 (LGA 2021)
- Website: Shire of Chittering
LGAs around Shire of Chittering
| Gingin | Victoria Plains | Victoria Plains |
| Gingin | Shire of Chittering | Toodyay |
| Swan | Swan | Toodyay |

The Shire of Chittering is a local government area in the Wheatbelt region of Western Australia, covering an area of about 1,200 square kilometres (460 sq mi) just beyond the northeastern fringe of the Perth metropolitan area, generally along and east of the Great Northern Highway. Its seat of government is the town of Bindoon.

== History ==
It was established as the Chittering Brook Road District on 10 January 1896, but was renamed the Chittering Road District on 7 February that year. On 1 July 1961, it became a shire following the enactment of the Local Government Act 1960, which reformed all remaining road districts into shires.

== Wards ==
On 3 May 2003, wards were abolished throughout the shire, and the 7 councillors represent all residents in the shire.

Prior to this, the ward system was as follows:

- Bindoon Ward (3 councillors)
- Chittering Ward (2 councillors)
- Muchea Ward (1 councillor)
- Wannamal Ward (1 councillor)

== Towns and localities ==
The towns and localities of the Shire of Chittering with population and size figures based on the most recent Australian census:

| Locality | Population | Area | Map |
|---|---|---|---|
| Bindoon | 1,215 (SAL 2021) | 330 km^{2} (130 sq mi) | |
| Chittering | 1,034 (SAL 2021) | 167.3 km^{2} (64.6 sq mi) | |
| Lower Chittering | 2,408 (SAL 2021) | 118.7 km^{2} (45.8 sq mi) | |
| Mooliabeenee | 213 (SAL 2021) | 106 km^{2} (41 sq mi) | |
| Muchea | 921 (SAL 2021) | 215.1 km^{2} (83.1 sq mi) | |
| Wannamal | 134 (SAL 2021) | 281 km^{2} (108 sq mi) | |

== Population ==
Historical population

| Year | Pop. | ±% p.a. |
|---|---|---|
| 1921 | 388 | — |
| 1933 | 665 | +4.59% |
| 1947 | 985 | +2.85% |
| 1954 | 1,319 | +4.26% |
| 1961 | 1,004 | −3.82% |
| 1966 | 1,075 | +1.38% |
| 1971 | 1,098 | +0.42% |
| 1976 | 1,072 | −0.48% |
| 1981 | 1,210 | +2.45% |

| Year | Pop. | ±% p.a. |
|---|---|---|
| 1986 | 1,409 | +3.09% |
| 1991 | 1,917 | +6.35% |
| 1996 | 2,257 | +3.32% |
| 2001 | 2,752 | +4.05% |
| 2006 | 3,520 | +5.05% |
| 2011 | 4,427 | +4.69% |
| 2016 | 5,472 | +4.33% |
| 2021 | 5,930 | +1.62% |

== Heritage-listed places ==
As of 2023, 148 places are heritage-listed in the Shire of Chittering, of which three are on the State Register of Heritage Places.
