= Coonana, Western Australia =

Community in Western Australia

Coonana
- Interactive map of Coonana
- Coordinates: 31.05°S 123.21°E
- Country: Australia
- State: Western Australia
- LGA: City of Kalgoorlie-Boulder
- Location: 775 km (482 mi) east of Perth; 180 km (110 mi) east of Kalgoorlie

Government
  - State electorate: Kalgoorlie
  - Federal division: O'Connor
- Elevation: 353 m (1,158 ft)

Population
  - Total: 83 (2006 census)
- Postcode: 6431

Coonana is a small Aboriginal community in Western Australia located 775 kilometres (482 mi) east of Perth, between Kalgoorlie and Laverton in the Goldfields-Esperance region of Western Australia. At the 2006 census, Coonana had a population of 83.

The community is situated on the 250,000-acre (100,000 ha) pastoral lease Upurl Upurlila Ngurratja and is about 4 kilometres (2.5 mi) south of the Trans-Australian Railway line between the stations of Chifley and Zanthus.
