= Karalundi College =

Location
- Great Northern Highway, Meekatharra, Western Australia; Australia; 26°07′38″S 118°40′45″E

Information
- Type: Independent co-educational secondary boarding school
- Motto: Walking and Learning Together
- Religious affiliation: Australian Union Conference of Seventh-day Adventists
- Denomination: Seventh-day Adventist
- Established: September 1954; 71 years ago
- Chairperson: Warwick Tullock
- Principal: John Corcoran
- Employees: 27
- Key people: Brendan Webb
- Years: 7–10
- Enrolment: 48
- Colours: Maroon and gold
- Slogan: Educate, Equip and Inspire
- Website: www.karalundi.wa.edu.au

Karalundi College is an independent Seventh-day Adventist co-educational secondary boarding school for indigenous Australian students, located on the Great Northern Highway, 58 kilometres (36 mi) north of Meekatharra, Western Australia, Australia.

The Karalundi College is an affiliated school of the Seventh-day Adventist education system, the world's second largest Christian school system.

== History ==
Karalundi was established in 1954 as an Aboriginal boarding school run by the Seventh-day Adventist Church in Western Australia. It was begun after its founder Pastor Dudley Vaughan was challenged to begin such a work by Avy Curley OAM. The property was 55 kilometres (34 mi) north of Meekatharra. The school served the Murchison, Upper Gascoyne, Pilbara and Western Desert regions. Classes began in September 1954, with a focus on literacy, numeracy and practical skills.

During its early years of operation, Karalundi was rated by the Western Australian Department of Education as a "most efficient establishment" and commended for the "relatively high standard of attainment" by students. Karalundi was closed in September 1974 in a government move to phase out church involvement in indigenous affairs. The property was sold into private hands and operated as a farm-stay enterprise for 12 years.

In the early 1980s, many past students came to recognise that under the state system, their children's education was inferior to their own. These parents lobbied the state government for Karalundi to reopen as an independent parent-controlled Christian Aboriginal boarding school, where children would be educated away from the problems associated with alcohol abuse and gain an education focusing on practical life skills, as well as literacy and numeracy. The advocacy group was supported by the Seventh-day Adventist Church and, in August 1986, Karalundi was reopened as such.

The school has been the location of published studies of a peer support program and a health promotion program in 1998.

Karalundi had extended its secondary program to include Years 11 and 12. However, in 2016 the school was closed. The school reopened in 2020 and now caters to a cohort of around 40 students in years 7 to 10 and is recognised as one of the leading schools in Aboriginal education in Western Australia.

== Student life ==
All students at the school are boarders. Students are housed in dormitories. Students are resident only during the school term and return to their communities for holiday periods.

Due to the boarding nature of Karalundi, all staff are encouraged to participate in the overall program of the school, both within and outside school hours. This entails being involved with the students in the social and spiritual life of Karalundi.

== Management ==
Karalundi is an independent parent controlled school, incorporated in 1986. An Executive Committee of 15 members (elected at an Annual General Meeting) is responsible for the governance and long term planning of Karalundi. Day-to-day management is delegated to the chief executive officer, Principal and Finance Controller who make up the Administrative Committee and are responsible for hiring of staff and faculty and implementing the strategic plan. The parents who operate the school are largely former Karalundi students. They are Seventh-day Adventists, and require that Karalundi be operated with the ethos of the Seventh-day Adventist faith. All staff are required to exhibit exemplary Christian standards before the students, and uphold the Christian ethos.

== Spiritual aspects ==
All students take religion classes each year that they are enrolled. These classes cover topics in biblical history and Christian and denominational doctrines. Instructors in other disciplines also begin each class period with prayer or a short devotional thought, many which encourage student input.

== See also ==
- Seventh-day Adventist education
- List of Seventh-day Adventist secondary schools
