= Bindoon, Western Australia =

Bindoon
- Town
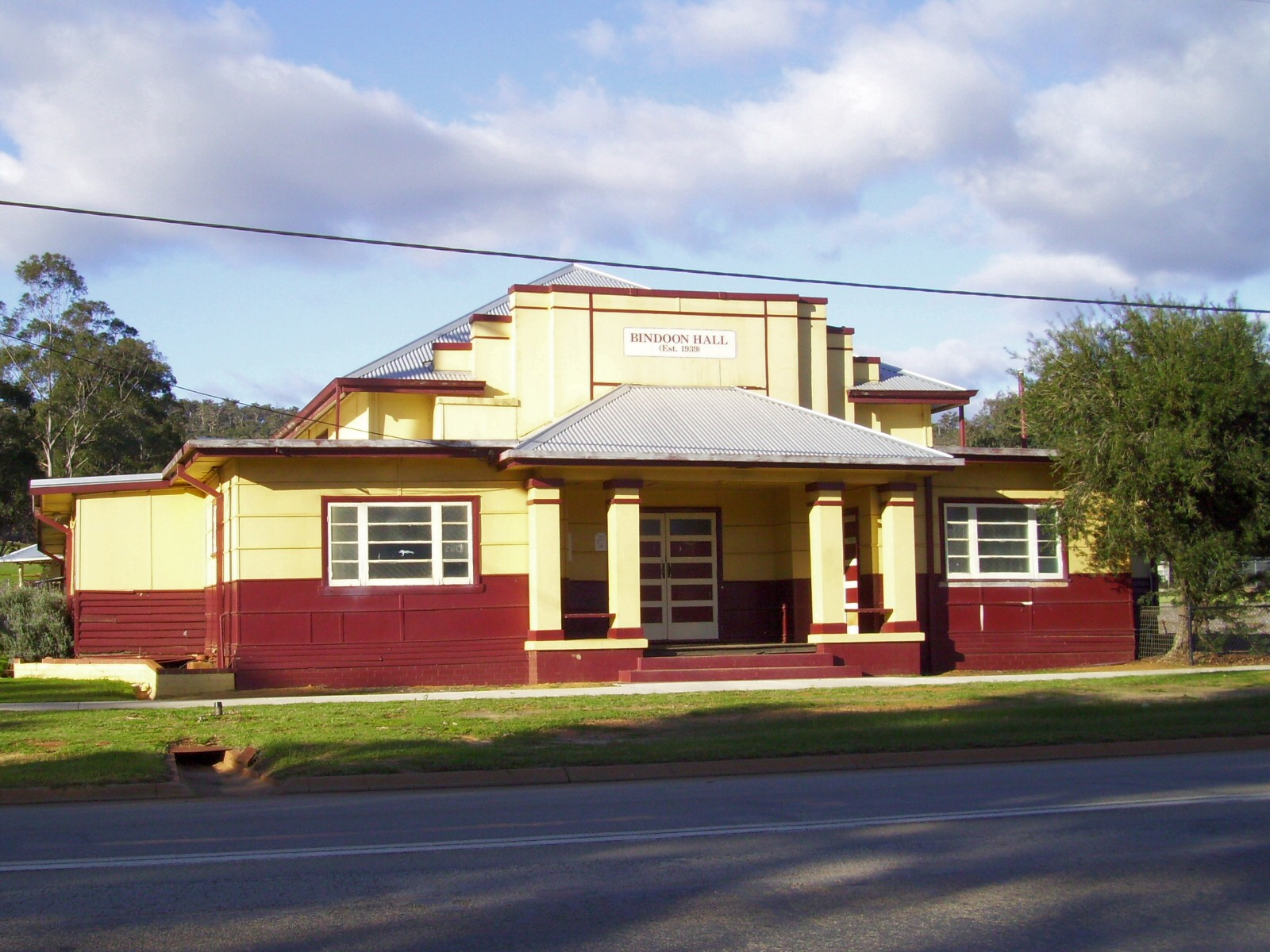
- Bindoon Town Hall

- Interactive map of Bindoon
- Coordinates: 31.38°S 116.097°E
- Country: Australia
- State: Western Australia
- LGA: Shire of Chittering
- Location: 84 km (52 mi) NNE of Perth; 19 km (12 mi) E of Gingin; 48 km (30 mi) ENE of Yanchep
- Established: 1953

Government
  - State electorate: Moore
  - Federal division: Durack

Area
  - Total: 330 km^{2} (130 sq mi)
- Elevation: 135 m (443 ft)

Population
  - Total: 1,215 (SAL 2021)
- Postcode: 6502

Bindoon is a town 84 kilometres (52 mi) from Perth city on the Great Northern Highway within the Shire of Chittering.

== History ==
The name Bindoon is thought to be Aboriginal in origin and to mean "place where the yams grow". The name has been in use in the area since 1843 when an early settler, William Brockman, named the property he had surveyed as Bindoon. The townsite was gazetted in 1953.

A bushfire was started by lightning near the town in 2013 and burnt over 2,000 hectares (4,942 acres) of farmland and bushland. The fire threatened homes, and over 100 residents were evacuated to a centre in Muchea.

== Facilities ==
=== Christian Brothers' school ===
The locality is most notable for the extensive campus of the Christian Brothers boarding school, known as Bindoon. The school is now called Edmund Rice College. It was previously Catholic Agricultural College at Bindoon. Before that it was called Keaney College, named in honour of its former principal Br. Paul Francis Keaney, who used young child migrants as forced labour to construct the college's huge stone building. Historically, the school was called Bindoon Boys Town, which started in 1938. The name was changed after revelations of institutionalised cruelty to Australian and migrant children. A series of inquiries, as well as the research of Margaret Humphreys, found that systemic sexual, physical and emotional abuse was perpetrated at the school. In one instance, a priest used a bullet attached to a stick to penetrate students as a form of punishment.

In 1989, Senator Jean Jenkins, the Australian Democrats senator for Western Australia, raised the issue in the nation's Senate on behalf of the Child Migrant Friendship Society of Western Australia and a number of individual former child migrants who had asked for her support. In 1994, the Parliament of Western Australia was presented a petition with 30,000 signatures which demanded an inquiry into the sexual and physical assaults that took place in Bindoon. Other institutions run by the Christian Brothers in Castledare, Clontarf and Tardun were also named in the petition. The child abuse that took place at Bindoon is alluded to in the 2011 film Oranges and Sunshine, which portrays the dedication of British social worker Margaret Humphreys in seeking justice for child migrants.

In December 2014, a royal commission found that "Christian Brothers leaders knew of allegations of sexual abuse of children at four WA orphanages, including Bindoon, and failed to manage the homes to prevent the systemic ill-treatment for decades." It also found that the institution was concerned by the cost of legal proceedings, and "there was no sentiment of recognising the suffering of the survivors." Closed at the end for the 2024 school year

=== SAS facility ===
The majority of training and selection for the Australian Special Air Service Regiment takes place at Bindoon. Some of the facilities include live-firing ranges and the Brigade Special Training Facilities (military operations in urban terrain).This involves various mock buildings such as a fake bank and fake embassy, containing scarce furniture.

The facility also includes three abseiling towers (one brick and two metal construction) of varying heights ranging from 30 to 60 metres. It also contains a runway, designated 05/23, with an asphalt surface measuring 580m (1,903 ft). Typically used for launching drones and UAVs.

The Australian Army Cadets also use this facility for their training regiments occasionally.

== Events ==
Bindoon annually hosts the Bindoon and Districts Agricultural Show. The districts covered are Bindoon, Chittering, Gingin, Bullsbrook among others. The show features cattle, poultry, fruit and vegetable exhibition and competition, horses in action, floriculture, cookery, art, general crafts, needlecrafts, photography, amateur wine making and home brewing, home produce, children's exhibition and pet parades.

An annual Bindoon Rock Festival was held in the 1980s and 1990s.

== Gallery ==
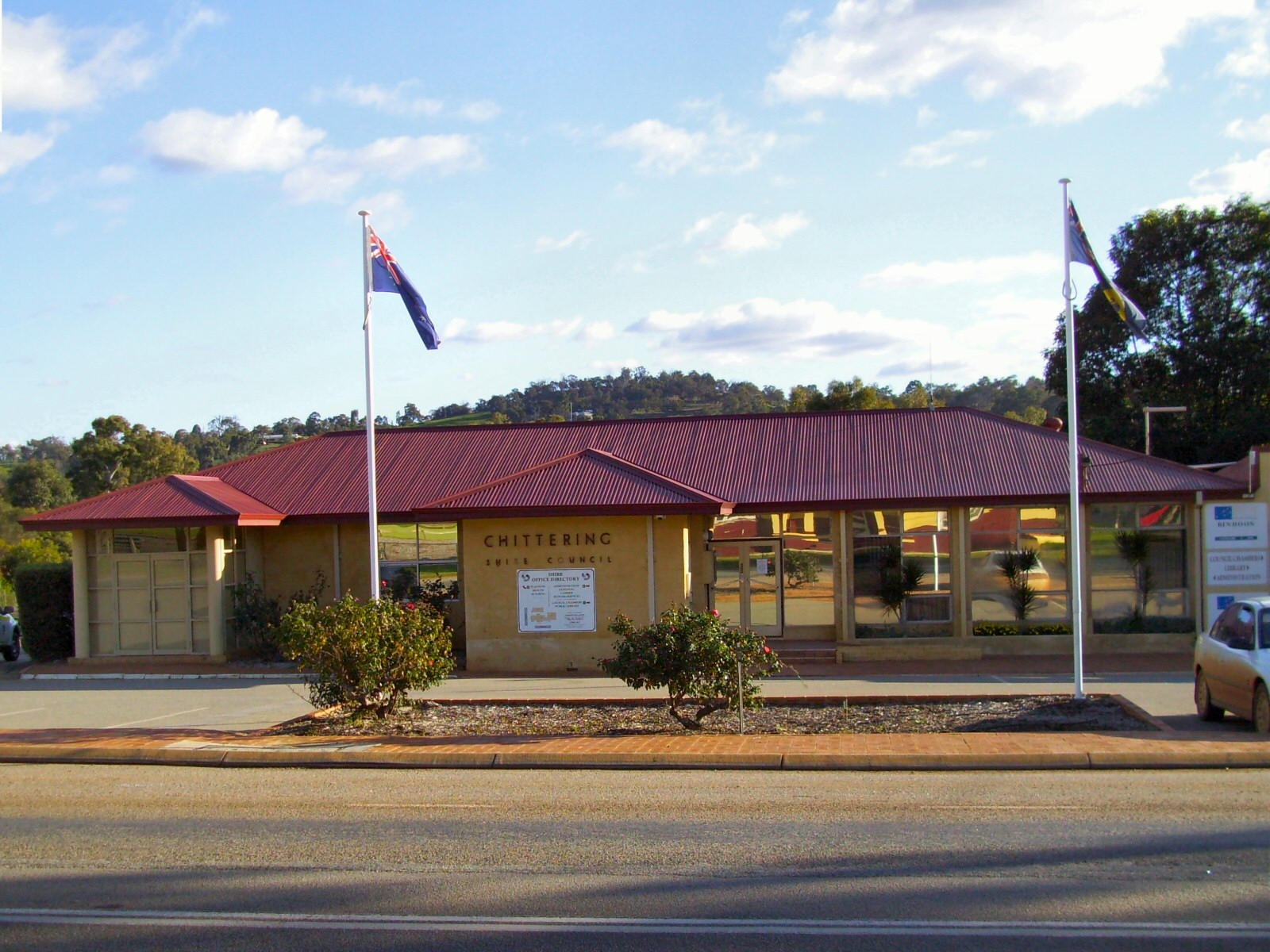
Main building of the Shire of Chittering

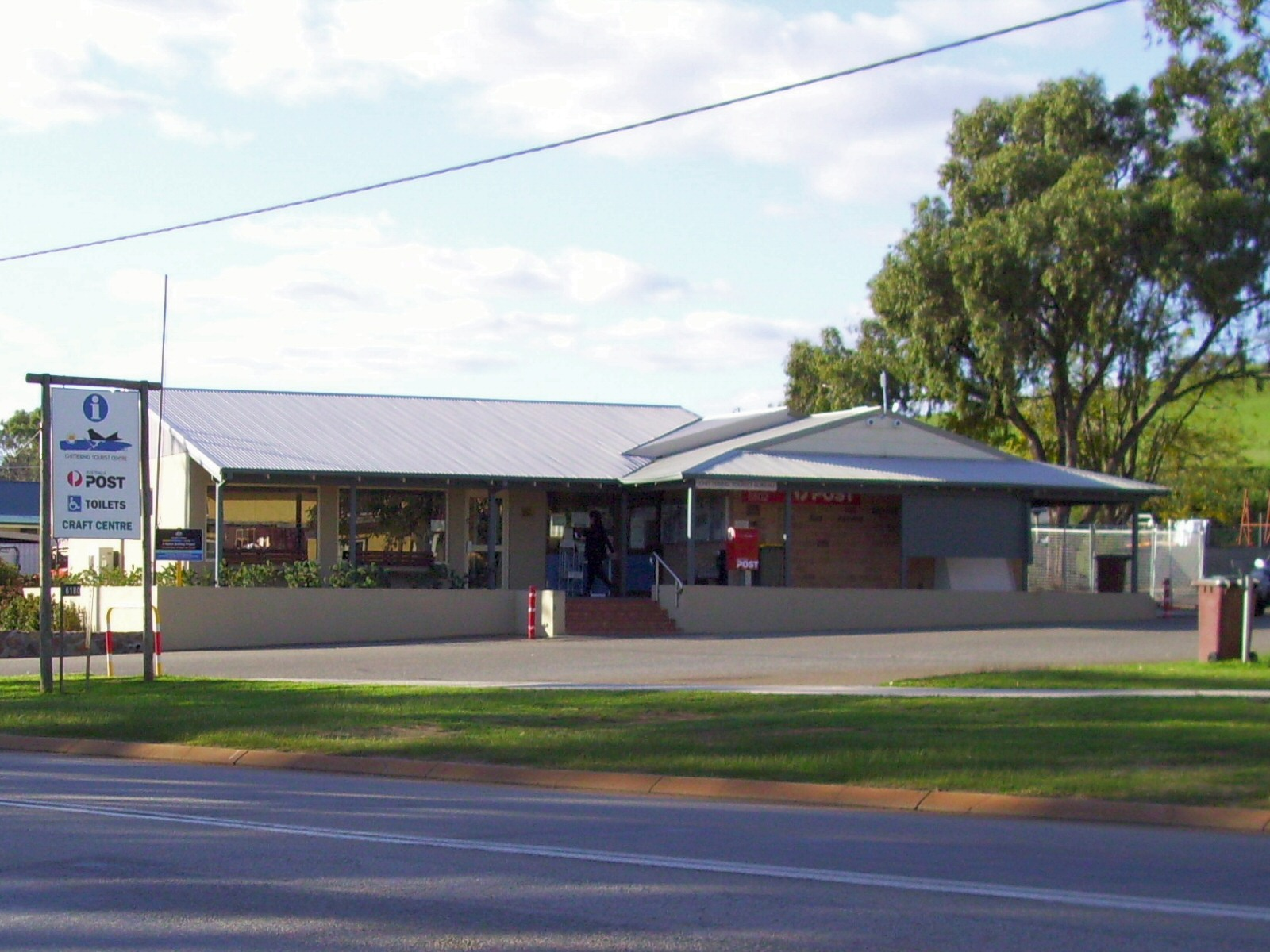
Chittering Tourist Centre and Bindoon Post Office
