= Shire of Victoria Plains =

Local government area in the Wheatbelt region in Western Australia

Coordinates: 31°05′17″S 116°27′11″E

- Local government area
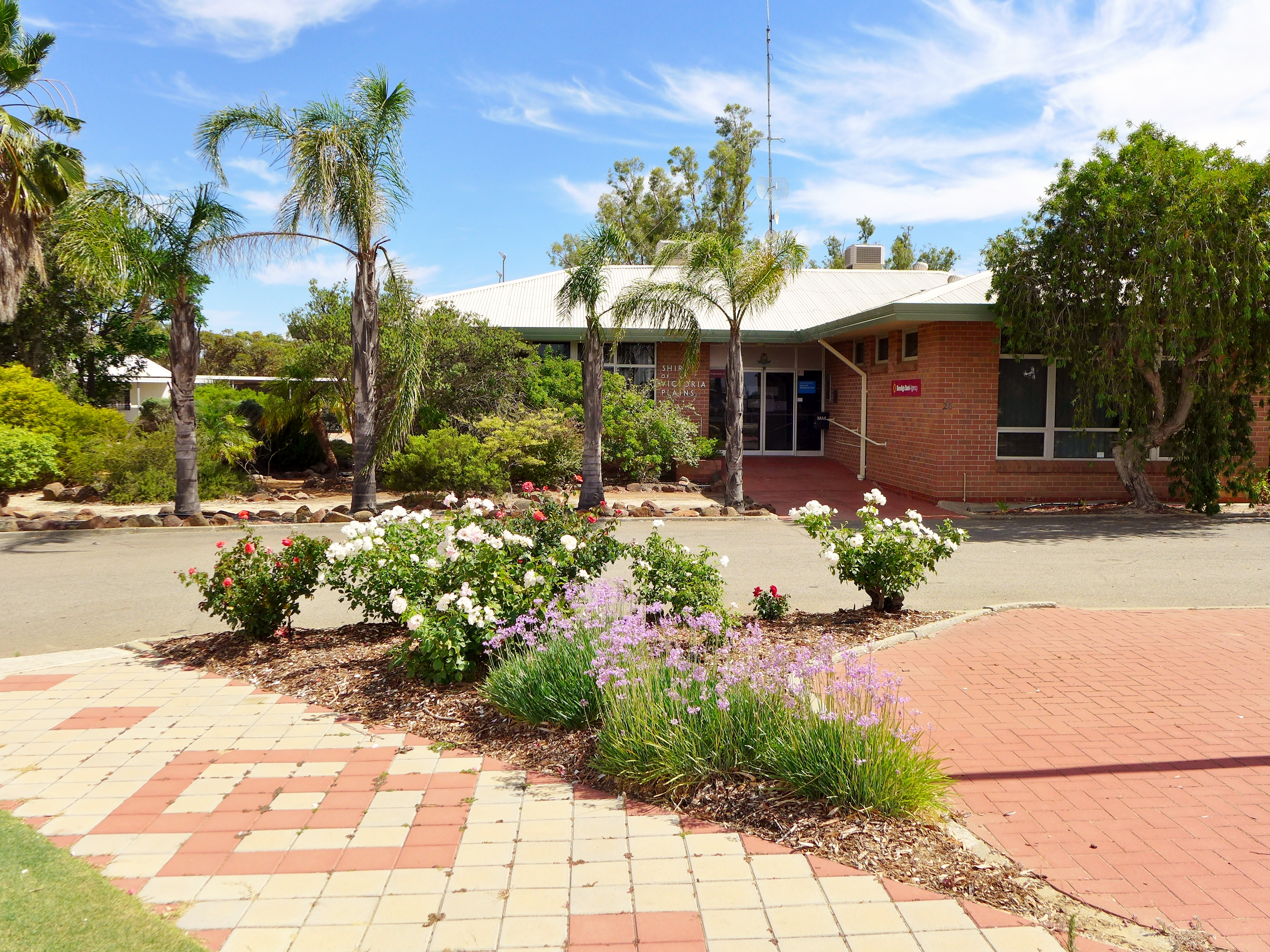
- Victoria Plains shire offices, Calingiri, 2014

- Interactive map of Shire of Victoria Plains
- Country: Australia
- State: Western Australia
- Region: Wheatbelt
- Established: 1871
- Council seat: Calingiri

Government
  - Shire President: Pauline Bantock
  - State electorate: Moore
  - Federal division: Durack

Area
  - Total: 2,569 km^{2} (992 sq mi)

Population
  - Total: 802 (LGA 2021)
- Website: Shire of Victoria Plains
LGAs around Shire of Victoria Plains
Dandaragan	Moora	Wongan-Ballidu
Gingin	Shire of Victoria Plains	Wongan-Ballidu
Chittering	Toodyay	Goomalling

The Shire of Victoria Plains is a local government area in the Wheatbelt region of Western Australia, about 160 kilometres (100 mi) north of the state capital, Perth. It covers an area of 2,569 square kilometres (992 sq mi), and its seat of government is the town of Calingiri.

== History ==
The Victoria Plains Road District was gazetted on 24 January 1871 covering an area extending as far north as Carnamah and east to the South Australian border. These areas gradually obtained their own local government over the next 40 years.

The Melbourne Road District separated on 10 February 1887.

On 11 December 1908, Moora Road District was gazetted and also separated.

As a result of the WA Local Government Act 1960, all remaining road districts became shires, including the Shire of Victoria Plains, on 1 July 1961.

== Towns and localities ==
The towns and localities of the Shire of Victoria Plains with population and size figures based on the most recent Australian census are as follows:

Locality	Population	Area	Map
Bolgart	128 (SAL 2021)	261 km^{2} (101 sq mi)	
Calingiri	198 (SAL 2021)	196.9 km^{2} (76.0 sq mi)	
Carani	29 (SAL 2021)	190.5 km^{2} (73.6 sq mi)	
Gillingarra	49 (SAL 2021)	220.6 km^{2} (85.2 sq mi)	
Glentromie	44 (SAL 2021)	181.1 km^{2} (69.9 sq mi)	
Mogumber	58 (SAL 2021)	250.6 km^{2} (96.8 sq mi)	
New Norcia	57 (SAL 2021)	146.6 km^{2} (56.6 sq mi)	
Old Plains	47 (SAL 2021)	265.5 km^{2} (102.5 sq mi)	
Piawaning	61 (SAL 2021)	173.7 km^{2} (67.1 sq mi)	
Waddington	26 (SAL 2016)	163.3 km^{2} (63.1 sq mi)	
Wyening	19 (SAL 2021)	138.9 km^{2} (53.6 sq mi)	
Yarawindah	23 (SAL 2016)	200.2 km^{2} (77.3 sq mi)	
Yerecoin	67 (SAL 2021)	161.2 km^{2} (62.2 sq mi)	

== Population ==
Historical population

Year	Pop.	±% p.a.
1911	880	—
1921	1,089	+2.15%
1933	1,241	+1.09%
1947	1,124	−0.70%
1954	1,810	+7.04%
1961	2,030	+1.65%
1966	1,785	−2.54%
1971	1,700	−0.97%
1976	1,493	−2.56%

Year	Pop.	±% p.a.
1981	1,332	−2.26%
1986	1,243	−1.37%
1991	1,079	−2.79%
1996	943	−2.66%
2001	963	+0.42%
2006	903	−1.28%
2011	895	−0.18%
2016	910	+0.33%
2021	802	−2.50%

== Heritage-listed places ==
As of 2023, 206 places are heritage-listed in the Shire of Victoria Plains, of which five are on the State Register of Heritage Places.
