= Chittering, Western Australia =

Chittering
- Town
- Coordinates: 31.45°S 116.1°E
- Country: Australia
- State: Western Australia
- LGA(s): Shire of Chittering
- Location: 70 km (43 mi) NNE of Perth; 23 km (14 mi) SE of Gingin

Government
  - State electorate(s): Moore
  - Federal division(s): Pearce

Area
  - Total: 167.3 km^{2} (64.6 sq mi)
- Elevation: 135 m (443 ft)

Population
  - Total(s): 1,034 (SAL 2021)
- Postcode: 6084

Chittering is a town and rural district approximately 70 km NNE of Perth, Western Australia. It is located along the Brockman River within the Shire of Chittering. It lies between the towns of Gingin and Toodyay, in the Wheatbelt region.

The area was first explored by George Fletcher Moore in 1836 and has been known by that name since Moore recorded it on his maps. The name is Aboriginal in origin and is thought to mean place of the willie wagtails.
