= Country Senior High Schools Carnival (Western Australia) =

Multi-sport event carnival held in Perth, Western Australia

School sport captains entering country week 2015 at HBF Stadium

Country Week or Country Senior High Schools Carnival is an annual multi-sport event carnival held in Perth, Western Australia, between rural high schools from Western Australia. The carnival is organised by School Sport WA.

The carnival includes sports such as Australian rules football, hockey, soccer, netball, volleyball and basketball in a range of divisions.

Non-sporting competitions in areas such as speech, debating and dance have also been added to the event schedule.

Country Week is recognised as being the biggest event of its kind in the Southern Hemisphere. The event typically involves about 40 schools with around 3,000 students and over 200 teachers and support staff.

The carnival is held toward the end of the second school term in late June and early July and lasts for one week.

The Amanda Young Foundation has supported the event by donating water bottles to all participating students. The bottles carry messages about the dangers of sharing water bottles to prevent the spread of meningococcal disease.

In 2015 the number of participants at the carnival was approximately 3,700, with the RAC sponsoring the event distributing water bottles as part of a road safety campaign, highlighting the over representation of young drivers dying on country roads.

== Venues ==
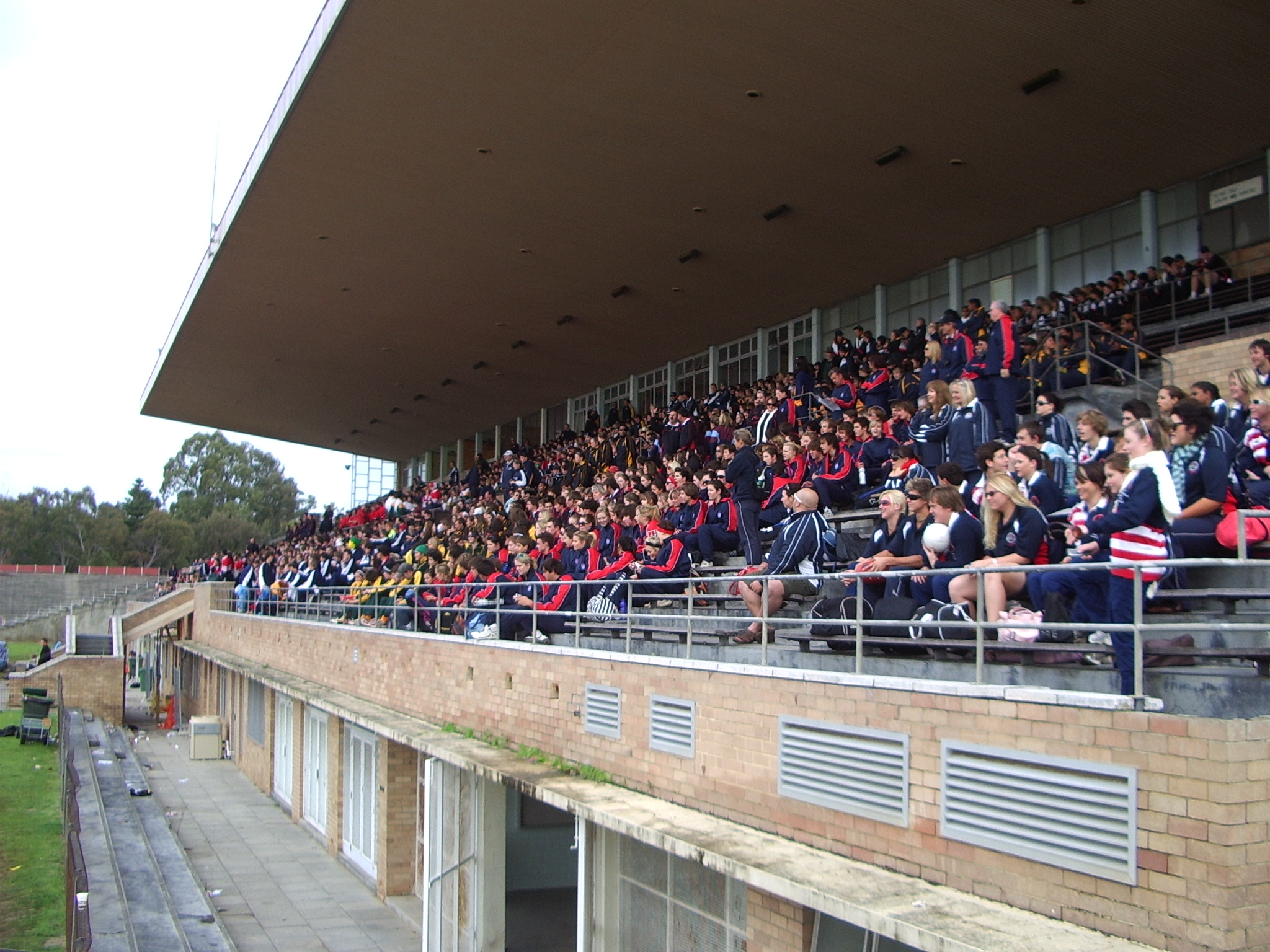
Country Week closing ceremony 2008 at Perry Lakes Stadium

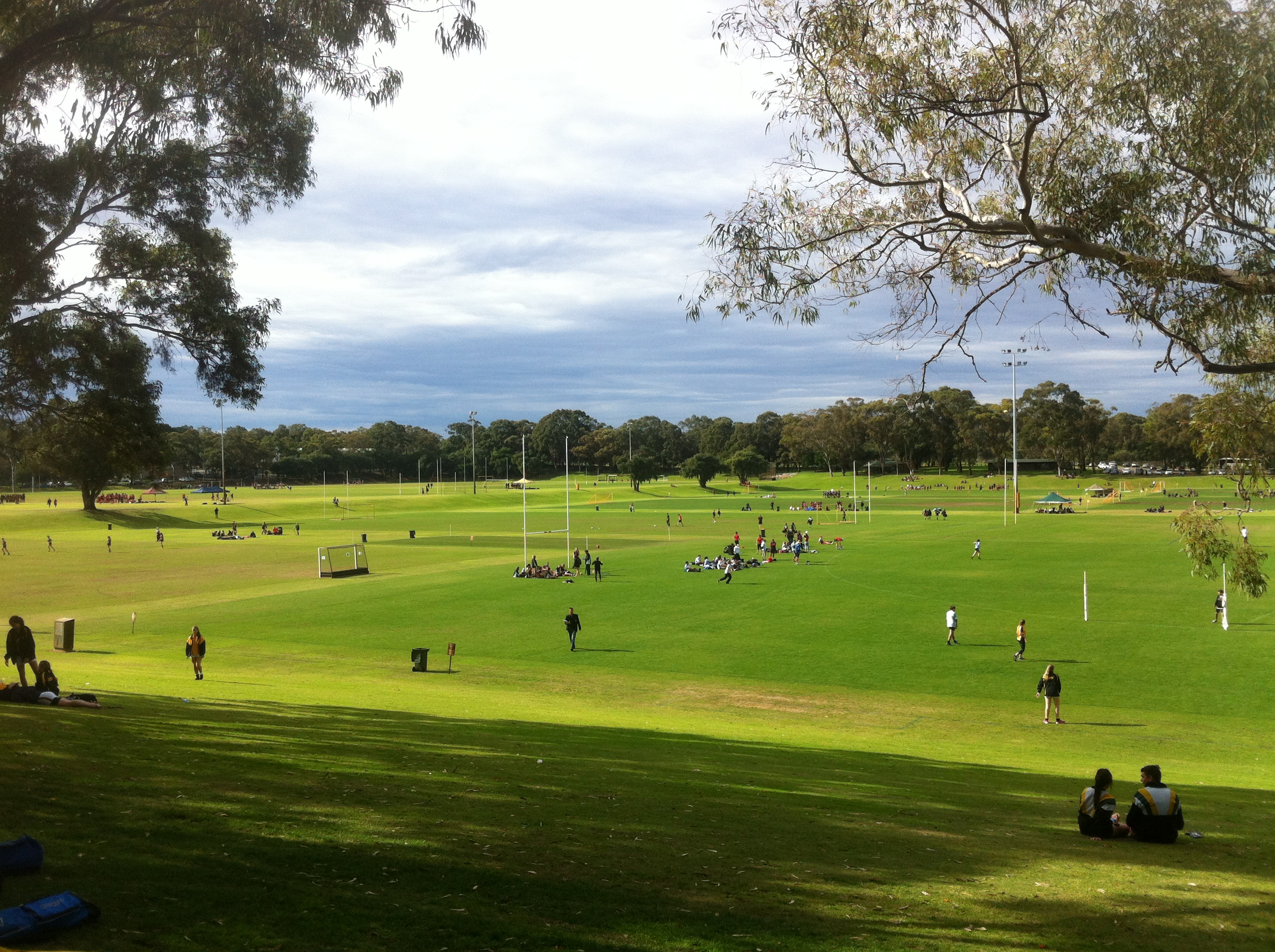
McGillvray Oval UWA Sports park Countryweek 2015

The opening and closing ceremonies were held at Perry Lakes Stadium from 1962 to 2008. Perry Lakes Stadium was declared unsafe for use in 2009 and later demolished in 2010.

As a result, the opening and closing ceremonies were held at Challenge Stadium in 2009 and 2010 and will continue to be held there in the future.

UWA sports park (commonly known as MacGillvray Oval) is the focal point of the tournament with football, soccer, touch rugby and many hockey games being played on the there. The remainder of the hockey games are played on the nearby UWA hockey Club turf.

The volleyball fixtures are played at Challenge Stadium, while basketball fixtures were played at Perry Lakes Stadium up until 2009, in 2010 basketball fixture were relocated to the Western Australian Basketball Centre which is located next to the Western Australian Athletics Stadium which in turn is next to Challenge Stadium.

Netball Games were played at Matthews Park at the outdoor Perth Netball Association Courts up until 2010. In 2010 and 2011 netball fixtures were relocated to the indoor acrylic courts of Lords in Subiaco.

Once the redevelopment of the Matthews Netball Centre Courts was completed in 2013 fixtures for netball were moved back to the centre in 2014 making use of the 47 courts 19 of which are indoors.

== History ==
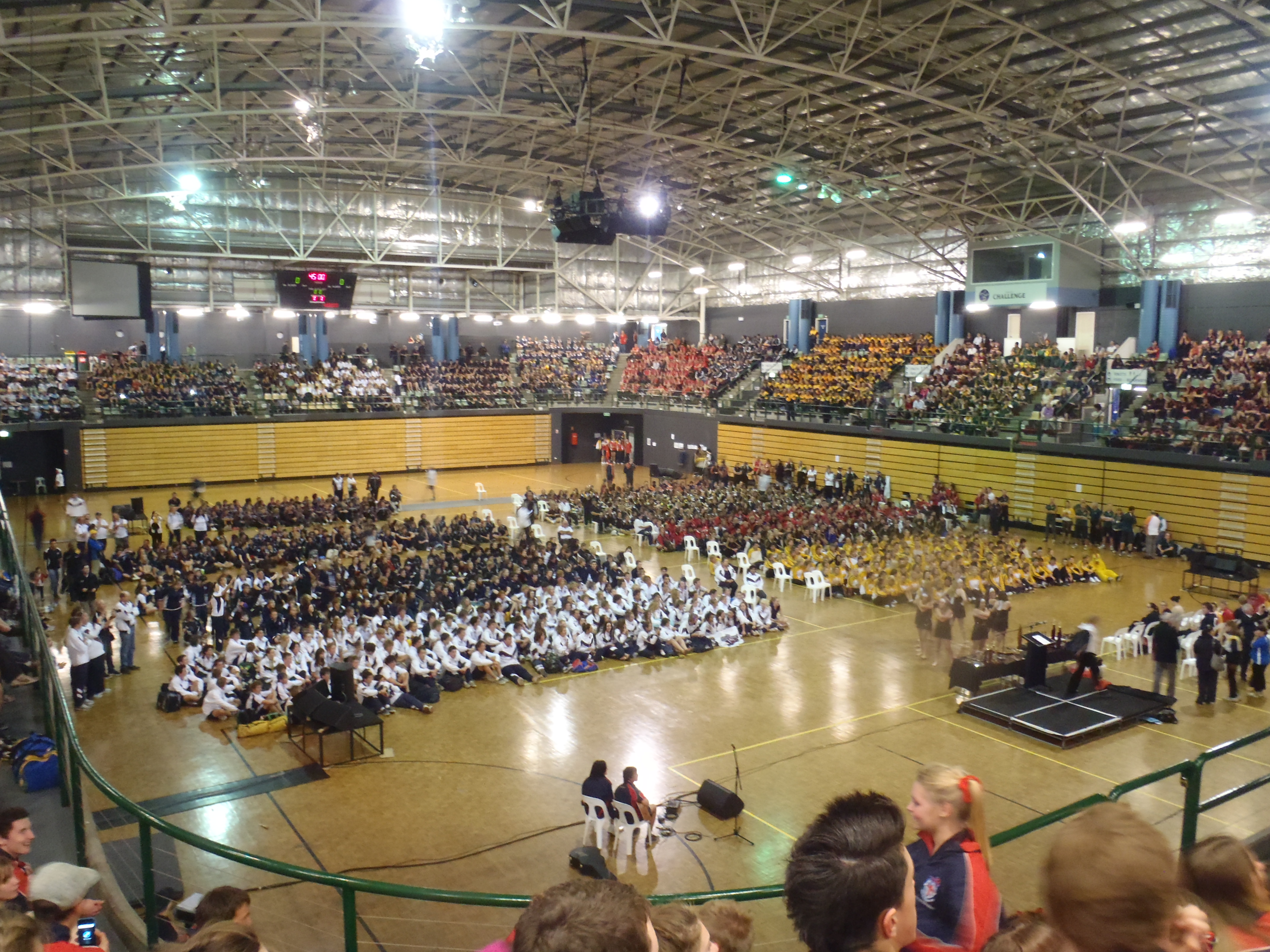
Country Week closing ceremony 2012

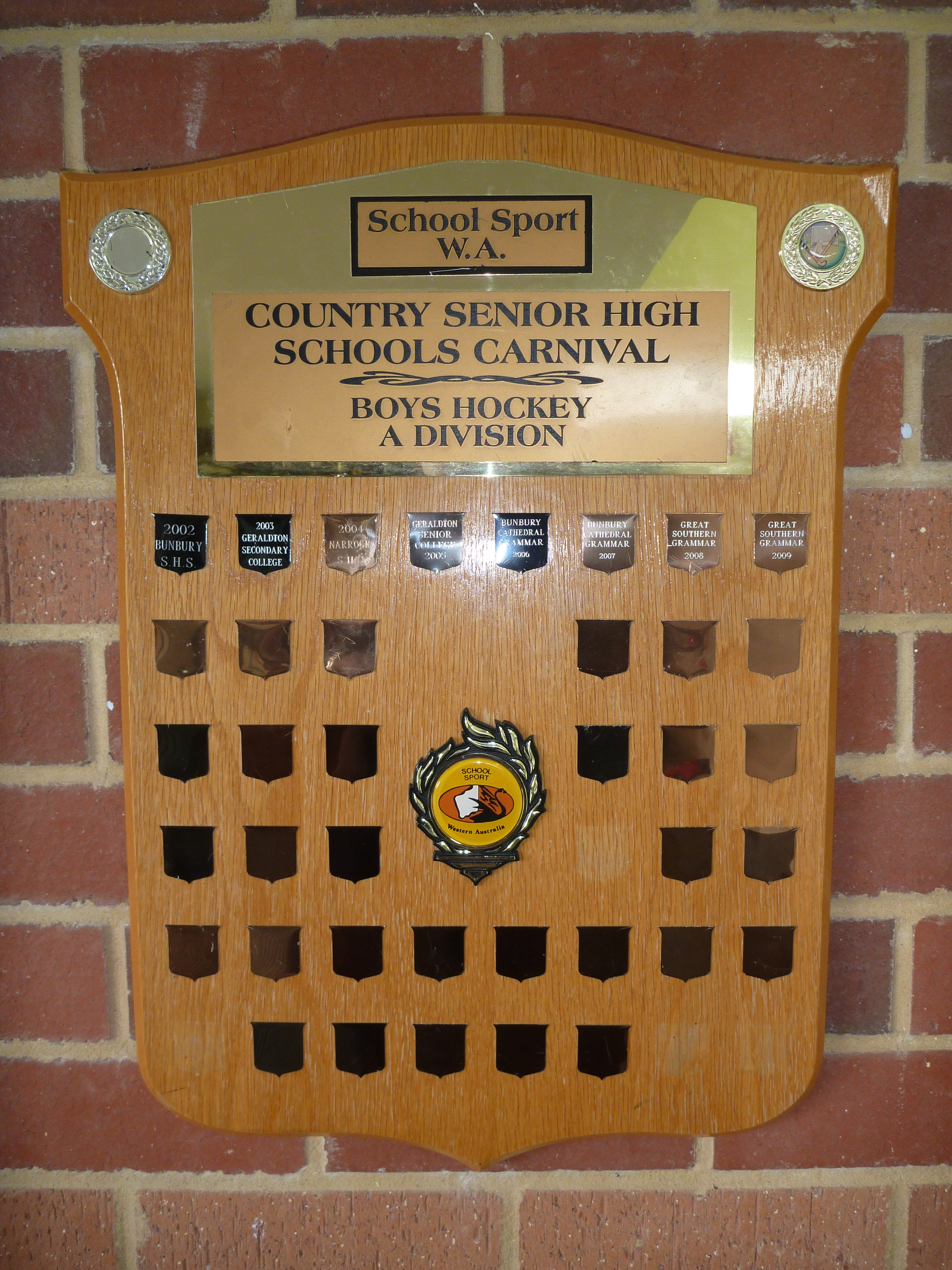
Country Week Boys A Grade Hockey Shield

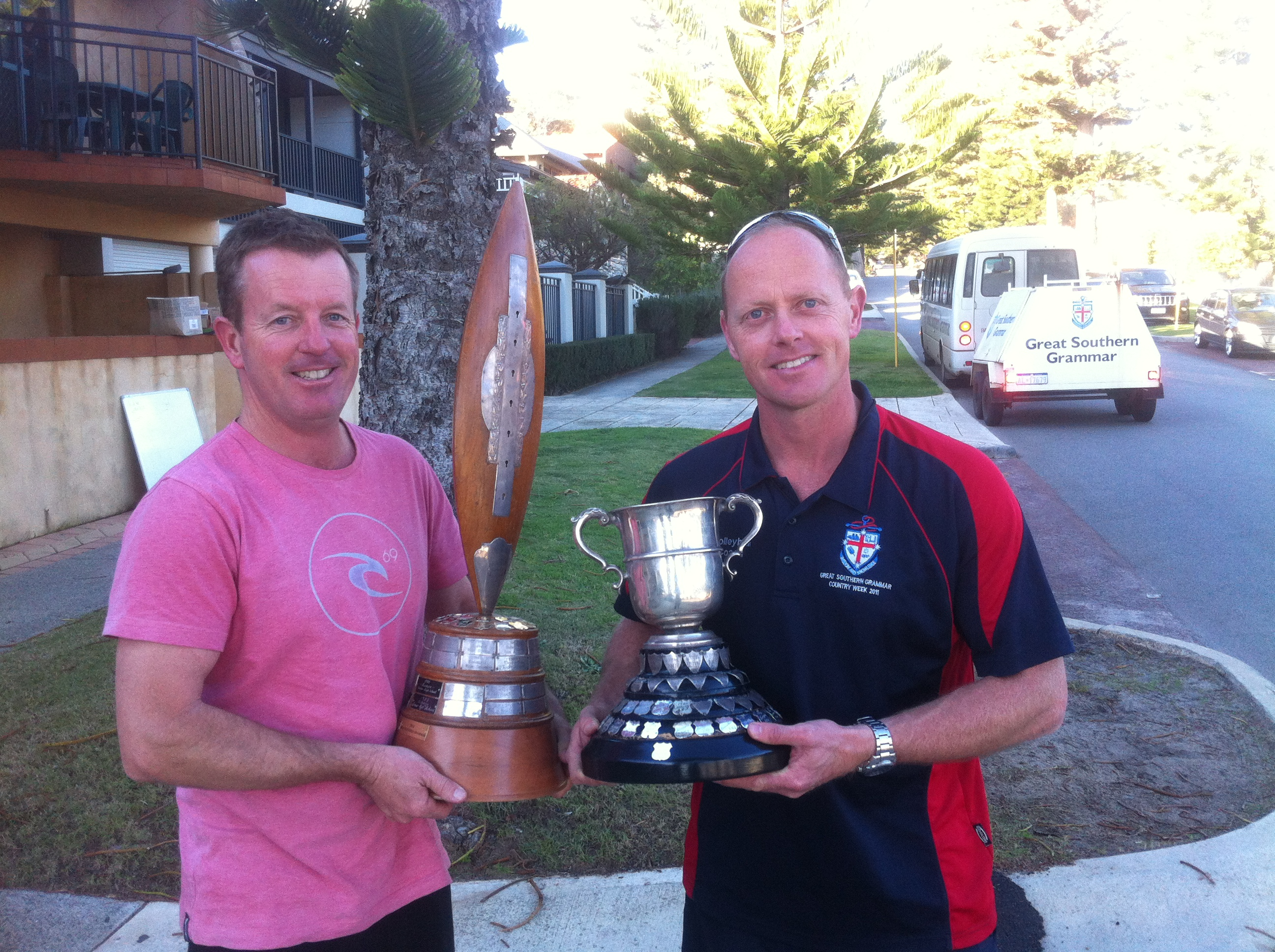
Girls Hockey and Boys AFL Football country week trophies

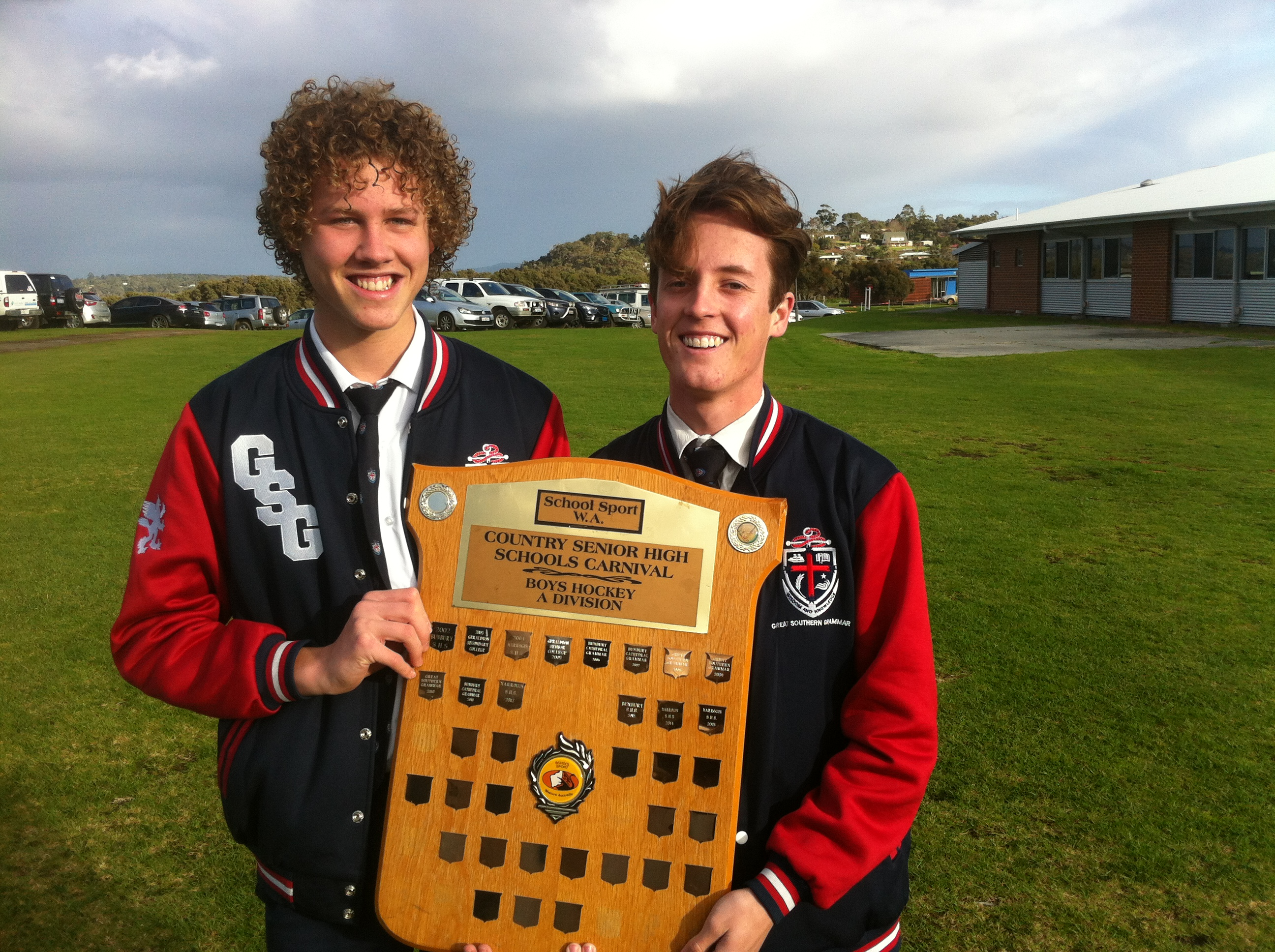
Boys Hockey Shield 2016

The first country week was held in Perth in 1924 and the only sport played was Australian rules football. At this time Perth schools were able to compete but Eastern Goldfields High School won the carnival. Perth Modern School won in the next carnival in 1925 with only football being played again. No competition was held for the next two years but resumed in 1928 with Bunbury High School winning.

In 1928, four schools competed; Northam, Albany, Bunbury and Eastern Goldfields. The sports on offer that year were football, hockey and athletics. Football games were played at various locations including Perth Oval and Leederville Oval, hockey games were played at the Esplanade and the Teachers Training College.

No competitions were held between 1940 and 1950.

Countryweek recommenced in 1951 with Perth Modern School again winning the football shield.

By 1952, girls teams began to compete in the event in field hockey with Bunbury High School winning the first tournament and awarded the High School Superintendents trophy.

Netball became part of the carnival in 1954 with Northam High School winning the first Netball shield, known as the Commonwealth Jubilee Celebrations shield.

The first event not of a sporting nature was added to the carnival in 1974 with individuals speech. A Geraldton Senior High School student, Susan Shea, won the first event.

Girls basketball was added to the tournament in 1979 with Eastern Goldfields High School winning the first competition. The next sport to be added to the roster was boys hockey in 1982 with Collie Senior High School emerging triumphant in the initial tournament.

A new shield was added to the competition in 1984 with the Champion School Shield being added to the prize roster. Points are awarded for every event and the school that achieves the highest total number of point wins the shield. The first school to win the shield was Narrogin Senior High School.

In 1986, boys volleyball was introduced to the competition and girls volleyball followed in 1987, Busselton Senior High School won both of the initial tournaments.

Boys basketball was added to the competition in 1991 with Newton Moore Senior High School being the first to win the CBA trophy.

The event was cancelled in 1995 and a result of industrial action between teachers and the state government. The State School Teachers Union of Western Australia instituted a work to rule order and teachers, who volunteer their time to coaching teams, supervising the students and organising the event, supported the order.

In 1999, boys soccer was added to the tournament and North Albany Senior High School were the first school to win the trophy.

Dance was added as an event to the tournament in 2003 with North Albany Senior High School winning the inaugural competition.

In 2004, Albany Senior High School won the champion school for the fifth time in a row to beat the previous record four time in a row held by Narrogin Senior High School between the years 1987 to 1990.

Industrial action by the State School Teachers Union of Western Australia marred Countryweek in 2008 with many of the larger schools such as Albany Senior High School, Australind Senior High School, Bunbury Senior High School, Narrogin Senior High School and Newton Moore Senior High School not competing in any events. Only 27 schools entered the event down from 39 the year before. Esperance Senior High School won the champion school for 2008 as one of the larger schools competing in the event.

In 2009, the opening and closing ceremonies were held at Challenge Stadium for the first time, as Perry Lakes Stadium had been earmarked for demolition.

Bunbury Senior High School won the champion school award in 2009 for the first time since the school started competing in 1928. The school team was composed of twelve separate teams with a total of 135 students competing on most sports. In 2010, Albany Senior High School regained the champion school award and Bunbury Senior High School came second. Bunbury Senior High School was awarded the champion school at the closing ceremony following a mix up in the tallying of results, Albany Senior High School received the award back later. Great Southern Grammar won the meritorious shield for the first time in 2010 after coming runners up in 2009.

2010 also marked a year of venue changes with netball games being played at Lords in Subiaco, Western Australia instead of Henderson Park and Basketball games being played at Western Australian Basketball Centre instead of Perry Lakes.

2011 again saw Albany Senior High School win the champion school award and Bunbury Senior High School come second. Bunbury Cathedral Grammar regained the meritorious shield from Great Southern Grammar.

The 2012 tournament was opened at Challenge Stadium with Albany Senior High School asking for a minutes silence for Neil Ritchie, a teacher at the school, who had died a fortnight before. The competition finished with Bunbury Senior High School taking home the school shield and Albany Senior High School come second. Great Southern Grammar were again runners up for the meritorious shield this time to Western Australian College of Agriculture – Narrogin.

Bunbury Senior High School were champion school again in 2013 ahead of Albany Senior High School. Bunbury Cathedral Grammar School won the meritorious shield with Western Australian College of Agriculture – Narrogin coming runners up.

Albany Senior High School was awarded the champion school shield in 2016 but has to hand it over to Bunbury Senior High School following a recount.

Tier one, Tier two and Tier three champion school were added to the prize roster in 2015 with Albany Senior High School winning Tier one, Halls Head Community College winning Tier two and Newman Senior High School winning tier three.

Bunbury Senior High School was awarded Tier One champion school from 2016 to 2019. Manjimup Senior High School was tier 2 champions in 2016 and 2017 and again in 2019 with Margaret River Senior High School winning in 2018.

The 2020 tournament was cancelled due to the COVID-19 pandemic. It was cancelled again in 2021 as a result of covid restrictions.

In 2022 the competition resumed but delayed and held in term three between 29 August and 3 September. Bunbury Senior High School won the champion school award once again.

== Selected results ==
Results for 2005 to 2023 – Boys A Division

Year	Boys Basketball	Boys Football	Boys Hockey	Boys Soccer
2005	Bunbury Senior High School	Geraldton Senior College	Geraldton Senior College	Albany Senior High School
2006	Geraldton Senior College	Mandurah Senior College	Bunbury Cathedral Grammar School	Newton Moore Senior High School
2007	Australind Senior High School	Newton Moore Senior High School	Bunbury Cathedral Grammar School	Australind Senior High School
2008	Eastern Goldfields College	Pinjarra Senior High School	Great Southern Grammar	Mandurah Senior College
2009	Bunbury Senior High School	Mandurah Senior College	Great Southern Grammar	Australind Senior High School
2010	Bunbury Senior High School	Albany Senior High School	Great Southern Grammar	Bunbury Cathedral Grammar School
2011	Denmark High School	Albany Senior High School	Bunbury Cathedral Grammar School	Mandurah Senior College
2012	Bunbury Senior High School	Albany Senior High School	Narrogin Senior High School	Albany Senior High School
2013	Bunbury Senior High School	Newton Moore Senior High School	Bunbury Senior High School	Bunbury Senior High School
2014	Geraldton Senior College	Great Southern Grammar	Narrogin Senior High School	Albany Senior High School
2015	Australind Senior High School	Newton Moore Senior High School	Narrogin Senior High School	Bunbury Cathedral Grammar School
2016	Busselton Senior High School	Newton Moore Senior High School	Great Southern Grammar	Albany Senior High School
2017	Great Southern Grammar	Bunbury Senior High School	Bunbury Senior High School	Albany Senior High School
2018	North Albany Senior High School	Albany Senior High School	Bunbury Senior High School	Bunbury Senior High School
2019	Denmark Senior High School	Manea Senior College	Narrogin Senior High School	Australind Senior High School
2020	Competition cancelled			
2021	Competition cancelled			
2022	Results not available			
2023	Bunbury Senior High School	Australind Senior High School	Great Southern Grammar	Manea Senior College

Results for 2005 to 2023 – Girls A Division

Year	Girls Basketball	Girls Hockey	Girls Netball	Girls Soccer
2005	Geraldton Senior College	Bunbury Cathedral Grammar School	Narrogin Senior High School	No Competition
2006	Geraldton Senior College	Collie Senior High School	Narrogin Senior High School	No Competition
2007	Geraldton Senior College	Newton Moore Senior High School	Australind Senior High School	Newton Moore Senior High School
2008	Eastern Goldfields College	Great Southern Grammar	Esperance Senior High School	Great Southern Grammar
2009	Bunbury Senior High School	Bunbury Cathedral Grammar School	Busselton Senior High School	Newton Moore Senior High School
2010	Bunbury Senior High School	Narrogin Senior High School	Great Southern Grammar	Albany Senior High School
2011	Denmark High School	Albany Senior High School	Albany Senior High School	Albany Senior High School
2012	Bunbury Senior High School	Albany Senior High School	Margaret River Senior High School	Albany Senior High School
2013	Bunbury Senior High School	Great Southern Grammar	Newton Moore Senior High School	Albany Senior High School
2014	Bunbury Senior High School	Great Southern Grammar	Bunbury Cathedral Grammar School	Australind Senior High School
2015	Denmark High School	Bunbury Senior High School	Bunbury Cathedral Grammar School	Bunbury Senior High School
2016	Newton Moore Senior High School	Great Southern Grammar	Bunbury Cathedral Grammar School	Australind Senior High School
2017	Manjimup Senior High School	Bunbury Senior High School	Bunbury Cathedral Grammar School	Manea Senior college
2018	Bunbury Senior High School	Bunbury Senior High School	Bunbury Cathedral Grammar School	Denmark High School
2019	Albany Senior High School	Bunbury Senior High School	Bunbury Cathedral Grammar School	Denmark High School
2020	Competition cancelled			
2021	Competition cancelled			
2022	Results not available			
2023	Bunbury Senior High School	Great Southern Grammar	Bunbury Cathedral Grammar School	Bunbury Senior High School

Results for 2005 to 2023 – School Results

Year	Champion School	Runner up Champion	Meritorious School	Runner up Meritorious
2005	Newton Moore Senior High School		Cunderdin Agricultural School	
2006	Newton Moore Senior High School	Albany Senior High School	Carnarvon Senior High School	Denmark Agricultural School
2007	Albany Senior High School	Newton Moore Senior High School	Northam Senior High School	Denmark Agricultural School
2008	Esperance Senior High School	Katanning Senior High School	Katanning Senior High School	
2009	Bunbury Senior High School	Newton Moore Senior High School	Bunbury Cathedral Grammar School	Great Southern Grammar
2010	Albany Senior High School	Bunbury Senior High School	Great Southern Grammar	Bunbury Cathedral Grammar School
2011	Albany Senior High School	Bunbury Senior High School	Bunbury Cathedral Grammar School	Great Southern Grammar
2012	Bunbury Senior High School	Albany Senior High School	Narrogin Agricultural College	Great Southern Grammar
2013	Bunbury Senior High School	Albany Senior High School	Bunbury Cathedral Grammar School	Narrogin Agricultural College

Year	Champion School	Runner up Champion	Tier 2 Champion	Tier 3 Champion
2014	Bunbury Senior High School	Albany Senior High School	Geraldton Senior College	Christmas Island District High School
2015	Albany Senior High School	Bunbury Senior High School tied with Bunbury Cathedral Grammar School	Halls Head Community College	Newman Senior High School
2016	Bunbury Senior High School	Albany Senior High School	Manjimup Senior High School	Christmas Island District High School
2017	Bunbury Senior High School	Albany Senior High School	Manjimup Senior High School	Christmas Island District High School
2018	Bunbury Senior High School	Albany Senior High School	Margaret River Senior High School	Christmas Island District High School
2019	Bunbury Senior High School	Manea Senior College	Manjimup Senior High School	Christmas Island District High School
2020	Competition cancelled			
2021	Competition cancelled			
2022	Bunbury Senior High School	Albany Senior High School	Bunbury Catholic College	Christmas Island District High School
2023	Bunbury Senior High School	Albany Senior High School	Great Southern Grammar	Christmas Island District High School
