= Australind Senior High School =

Location
- Australind, South West region, Western Australia; Australia; 33°16′42″S 115°43′45″E

Information
- Type: Public co-educational high school
- Motto: Through Endeavour, Success
- Established: 1987; 39 years ago
- Educational authority: WA Department of Education
- Principal: Domenic Camera
- Years: 7–12
- Enrolment: 1,263 (2015)
- Campus type: Regional
- Website: www.australind.wa.edu.au

Australind Senior High School is a comprehensive public co-educational high school, located in Australind, a regional centre in the South West region, 163 kilometres (101 mi) south of Perth, Western Australia.

== Overview ==
The campus is made up of modern buildings that overlook the Brunswick River.

The school was established in 1987 and by 2012 had an enrolment of 982 students between Year 8 and Year 12, 34 (3%) of whom were Indigenous Australians.

The school was not officially opened until 1994 after operating for 7 years.

In 2007 the school received federal government funding to implement the Success for Boys program.

Enrolments at the school have fluctuated over the last six years. Enrolments have been 983 students in 2007, 1,216 in 2008, 1,157 in 2009, 1,010 in 2010, 982 in 2011, 982 in 2012, 977 in 2013, 1,007 in 2014 and 1,263 in 2015. The jump in enrolments in 2015 being the addition of a Year 7 cohort moving to high school and the half cohort departing.

The school came third overall in the 2012 and 2013 Country Week carnival behind cross-town rivals Bunbury Senior High School who won and Albany Senior High School who came second.

== Incidents ==
A 14-year-old student stabbed two classmates during lunchtime in 2006 and went to trial in 2007. He was acquitted following evidence that he brought the knife to school to defend himself, and that three other students had provoked the fight.

On 5 March 2019, the bushland behind Australind Senior High School caught fire. The police, firemen, and water bomber planes were all involved and the fire was extinguished within a few hours. One classroom was impacted by severe heat destruction, and was rendered unsafe. Staff called 000 at around 2:45pm and students were reported to have been rushed out on to the front lawn and told to go home. School resumed on the following day. However, students with respiratory problems were advised to stay home due to smoke residue and fumes.

== Notable alumni ==
- David Scaife – Member of the Western Australian Legislative Assembly for the Australian Labor Party since the 2021 election
- Nicole Trunfio – Model
- Mark Worthington – Former basketballer who played in the National Basketball League

== See also ==
- List of schools in rural Western Australia
