= Newton Moore Senior High School =

Location
- South Bunbury, South West region, Western Australia; Australia; 33°21′37″S 115°38′06″E

Information
- Type: Independent public co-educational high day school
- Motto: Latin: Hocd Signo Vinces
- Established: 1966; 60 years ago
- Educational authority: WA Department of Education
- Principal: Kate Nightingale
- Years: 7–12
- Enrolment: 537 (2023)
- Colours: Blue, gold and white
- Website: www.newtonmooreshs.wa.edu.au

Newton Moore Senior High School is a comprehensive independent public co-educational high day school, located in South Bunbury, a suburb of Bunbury, 175 kilometres (109 mi) south of Perth, Western Australia.

== Overview ==
The school was established in 1966 and by 2023 had an enrolment of 537 students between Year 8 and Year 12 , and as of 2020, approximately 24% of whom were Indigenous Australians.

The school was opened in 1966 to cater for the rising population of Bunbury and the lack of available space around Bunbury Senior High School. The school is named after the eighth Premier of Western Australia, Sir Newton James Moore.

A longstanding competitor in the High School Country Week tournament, the school won the champion school award in 1991, 1992, 2005 and 2006.

Enrolments at the school have been in decline over the past few years with 983 students in 2007, 994 in 2008, 897 in 2009, 712 in 2010, 620 in 2011 and 611 in 2012.

== See also ==
- List of schools in rural Western Australia
