= Great Southern Grammar =

School in Albany, Western Australia

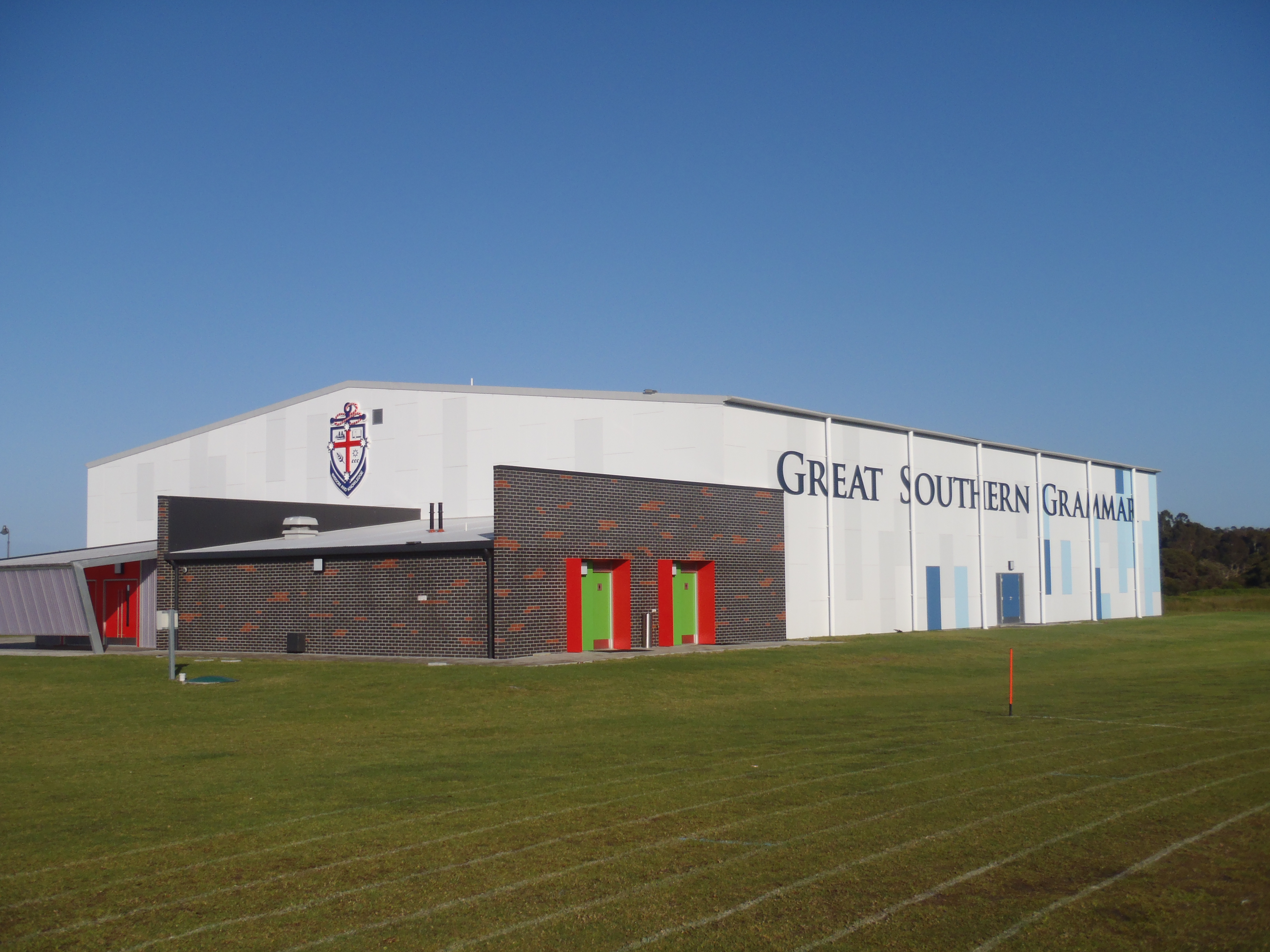
- Multi purpose sport facility

Location
- Lower Kalgan, Albany, Great Southern region, Western Australia; Australia; 34°56′49″S 117°58′13″E

Information
- Type: Independent co-educational primary and secondary day and boarding school
- Motto: Wisdom and Knowledge
- Religious affiliation: Non-denominational Christianity
- Established: 1999; 27 years ago
- Educational authority: WA Department of Education
- Chair: Ian Clarke
- Principal: Mathew Irving
- Chaplain: Levi Cosh
- Employees: ~170
- Years: K–12
- Enrolment: c. 800 (2017)
- Campus size: 58 hectares (144 acres)
- Campus type: Regional
- Houses: Baudin, Camfield, Mokare, Wilson
- Colours: Blue, white, red, green and Clan Colquhoun tartan
- Slogan: Embark on a Journey of Discovery
- Song: School of the Sea
- Publication: The Semaphore
- School Hymn: The Servant King
- Website: www.gsg.wa.edu.au

Great Southern Grammar is an independent non-denominational Christian co-educational primary and secondary day and boarding school, located in the Great Southern regional town of Kalgan, Western Australia between the King River and the Kalgan River. The school is situated approximately 16 kilometres (10 mi) east of Albany, a regional centre 390 kilometres (242 mi) south-southeast of Perth.

The campus has a total area of 58 hectares (144 acres) bordered by Nanarup Road to the north, Oyster Harbour to the south, Johnston Creek to the west and the Kalgan River to the east.

The school is non-selective, and caters for boys and girls from age four (Kindergarten) through to age eighteen (Year 12). Students attend the school predominantly from Albany and the Great Southern, but also from other parts of Australia and internationally, with a current boarding population of ~140.

In 2009 the school was ranked at number 10 in Western Australia, based on results of its Year 12 students.

== History ==
=== Foundation ===
Great Southern Grammar was founded in 1996 by a development committee of those interested in forming an independent school in the Great Southern region of Western Australia. A foundation ceremony was conducted in 1998. After opening in rented premises at Mount Melville in 1999 with 36 students, the school relocated to the Lower Kalgan campus in 2000. The school catered for Year 8 to 10 students when it first opened.

In his address at the opening of the school, local Noongar elder, Aiden Eades stated, "The school grounds are of special significance to local Noongars, with the Kalgan and the King rivers meeting close by. Never forget that this is Noongar land but you are welcome to use it, especially for something like education."

=== Growth ===
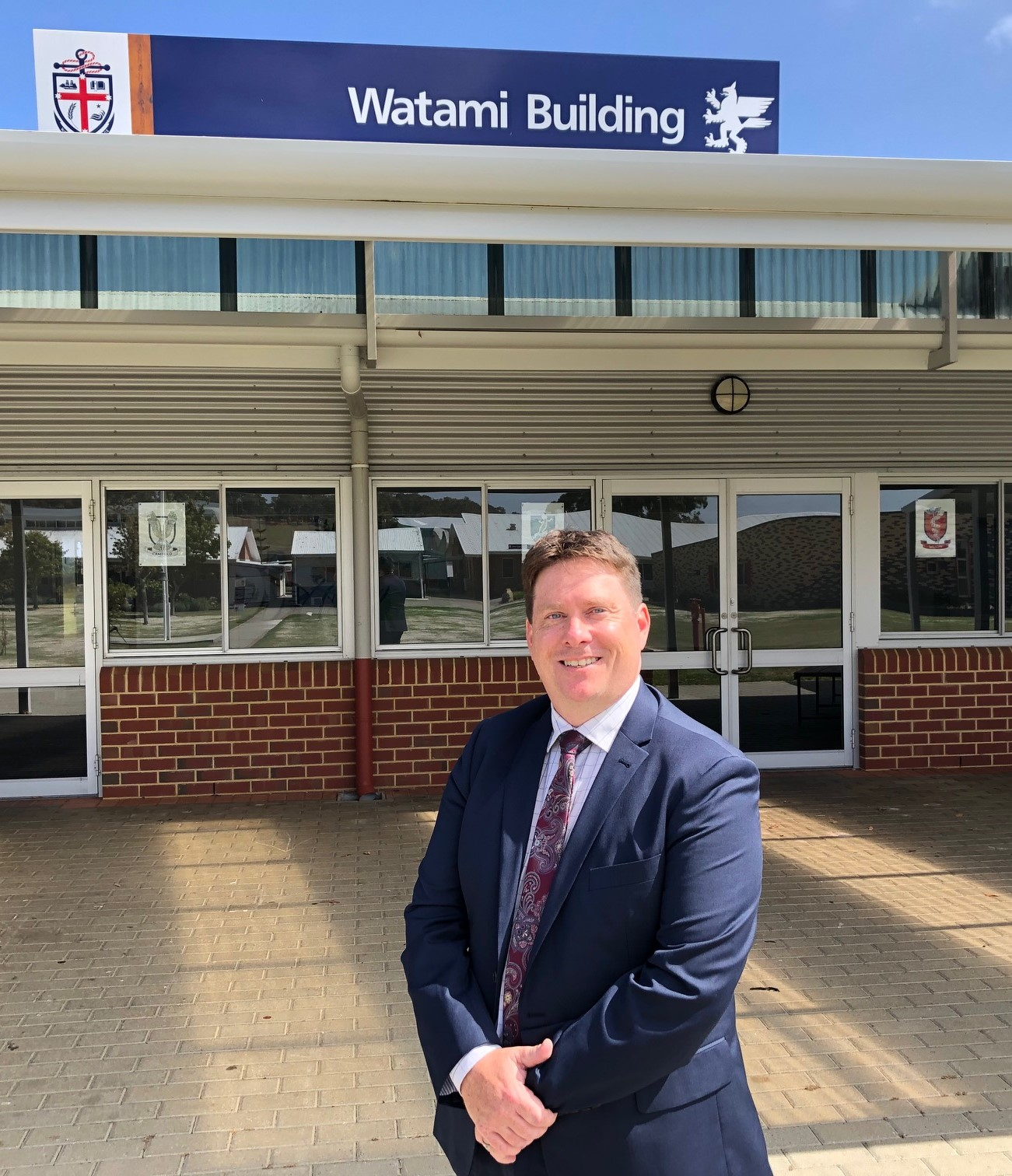
Mathew Irving Principal of GSG in 2024

In 2002 the Junior School opened which catered for students from Kindergarten to Year 6. The Middle School continued to operate for students in Year 7 to Year 9 and the Senior School continued to cater for students from Year 10 to Year 12.

The Senior School building was extended to include an extra six classrooms in 2004. The construction company, Wauters Enterprises, won a construction excellence award from the Master Builders Association.

The new Middle School building, including new classrooms, music facilities and science laboratory was opened in 2009. The building was awarded as the best commercial building for the Great Southern region in 2009.

Liz Constable, the Minister of Education, visited the school in 2010 in recognition of the school's strong performance in the TEE examinations in 2009 where the school ranked in the top ten of the state.

The new senior boarding wing, Michaelmas House, named after the island of same name in King George Sound, was opened at the commencement of Term One in 2010.

The new multi-purpose sports facility, partially funded by the Building the Education Revolution program, featuring two basketball courts and a synthetic surface, was completed and opened in June 2010 during the school's Foundation Day ceremony.

The school won the Best School Grounds category for the region in the Keep Australia Beautiful Council's awards for 2010.

Opening the new music building in April 2011, the school had new spaces for music lessons, a recording studio, storage for equipment and a direct connection to the existing hall that is used for drama lessons and performances.

A new senior school building was opened in 2012 with additional classrooms and undercover areas, the new building was named the Pratten Centre after Peter Pratten, one of the School founders and chair of the School council.

=== 25 Years of Foundation ===
In 2023, Great Southern Grammar celebrates its 25th anniversary of foundation from 1998. GSG Foundation Day occurs on 7 June with the Foundation Assembly occurred on Friday 9 June 2023.

The celebration of Great Southern Grammar's foundation is taken as a greater milestone within GSG and the GSG community with previous students, staff, principals and current students, staff and families with the support of special guests who make an impact on Great Southern Grammar and its development.

== Principals ==
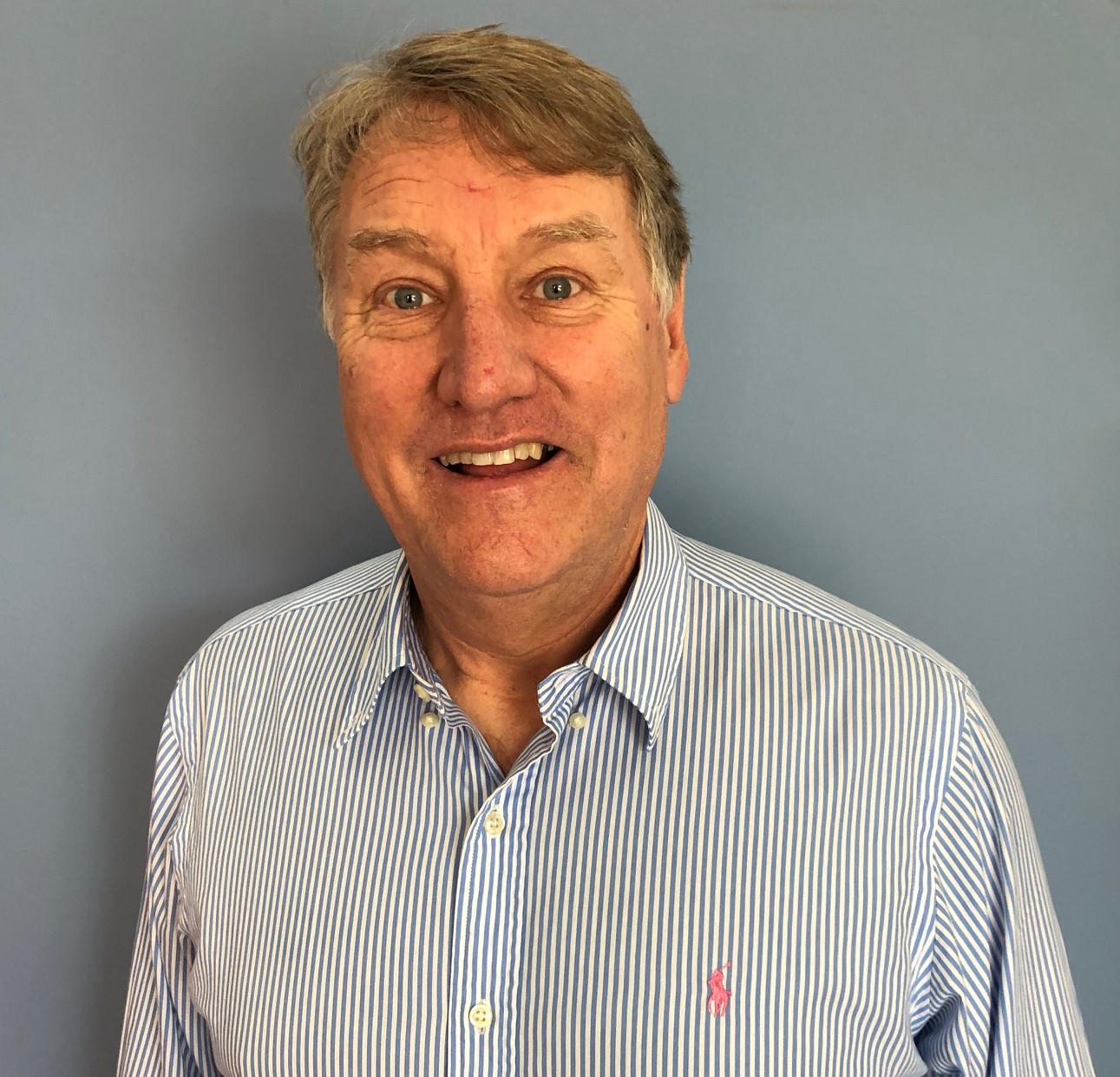
Mark Sawle Principal of GSG in 2023

The founding headmaster of the school was Reverend Stephen Lee who accepted the position in 1999. He left the school in 2003 to become the principal of Methodist Ladies College. The second headmaster was Peter Welch who managed the school from 2004 to 2007. Stuart Marquardt joined the school from Sunshine Coast Grammar School in 2007 as the school's third headmaster. Marquardt left the school in 2016 to take up a position as the principal of Lindisfarne Anglican Grammar School, in New South Wales.

Upon Marquardt's departure in 2016, the school changed the title of the leadership position from 'headmaster' to 'principal'. Mark Sawle joined the school in 2016 from Aquinas College and retired at the end of 2023. Mathew Irving then joined the school coming from Wesley College.

Period	Details
1999–2003	Rev. Stephen Lee
2004–2007	Peter Welch
2008–2016	Stuart Marquardt
2016–2023	Mark Sawle
2024–	Mathew Irving

== Affiliations and associations ==
The school is affiliated with the Association of Heads of Independent Schools of Australia (AHISA), the Australian Boarding Schools' Association (ABSA), Independent Primary School Heads of Australia (IPSHA), and the Association of Independent Schools in Western Australia (AISWA).

== Academics ==
The school appears regularly in the top 50 schools for the Western Australian Certificate of Education. Ranked as the top school in the Great Southern region in 2012, 2011, 2010, 2009, 2008 and 2007. In 2009 the school was also ranked as the top regional school in the state.

Year	% +75 in WACE (Note: Based on the number of Stage 3 course enrolments in the school where a WACE course score of 75 or above was achieved)	State ranking (Note: Ranking of school compared to other schools in the state)	% +65 in WACE (Note: Based on the number of Stage 3 course enrolments in the school where a WACE course score of 65 or above was achieved)	State ranking	% graduation (Note: Percentage of Year 12 cohort that graduated with a WACE certificate)
2012	16.36	22	41.09	30	100
2011	19.00	23	41.00	46	98.4
2010	11.01	47	45.81	41	100
2009		18		10	100

== Expedition program ==
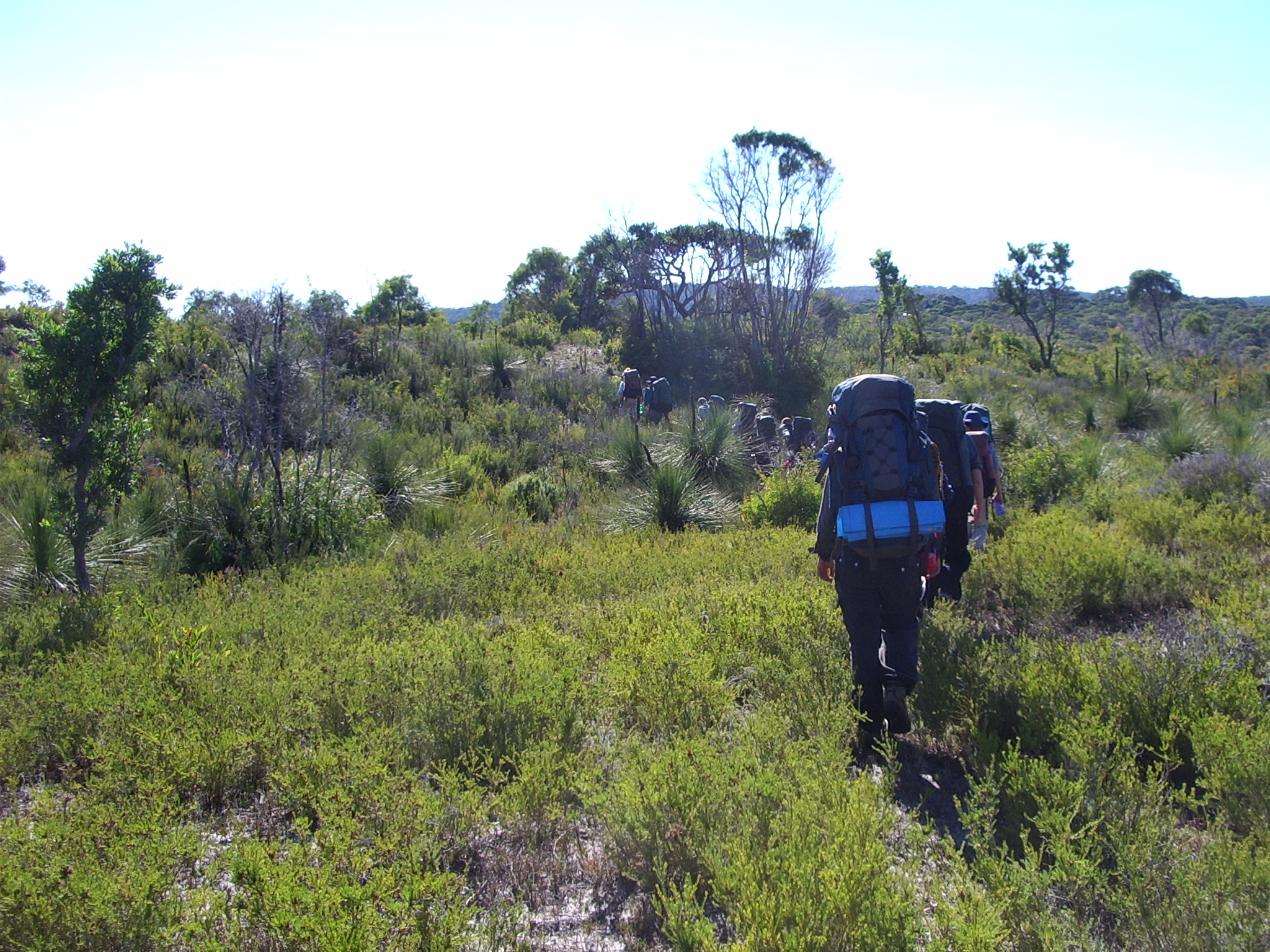
Outward Bound School Group in Walpole-Nornalup National Park

The school has a long association with Outward Bound and have conducted compulsory expeditions in all levels of the Middle school and Year Ten in the Senior School. Commencing in 2009 the school only Year 9 and Year 10 students have attended compulsory Outward Bound expeditions with an optional program being available for Year 11 students. The expeditions are conducted in the D'Entrecasteaux National Park and Walpole-Nornalup National Park with students being accompanied by a staff member and an outward bound instructor. The school have a greater association to outdoor education with providing school camps, Leeuwin and many other expeditions. Ranging locations, year groups and activities, The school has many opportunities for students to engage with the environment around the Great Southern and beyond.

== Sport ==
The school participates in many sports in the local leagues including soccer, netball, hockey and basketball. The sporting uniform is navy blue and red, usually in horizontal stripes, although the design has changed through the years. Football teams are entered into the Belt Up Cup carnival and the Smarter than Smoking carnivals and have achieved a good deal of success in their endeavour including winning the regional title in 2007 and 2008 for the Belt Up Cup.

Country Week

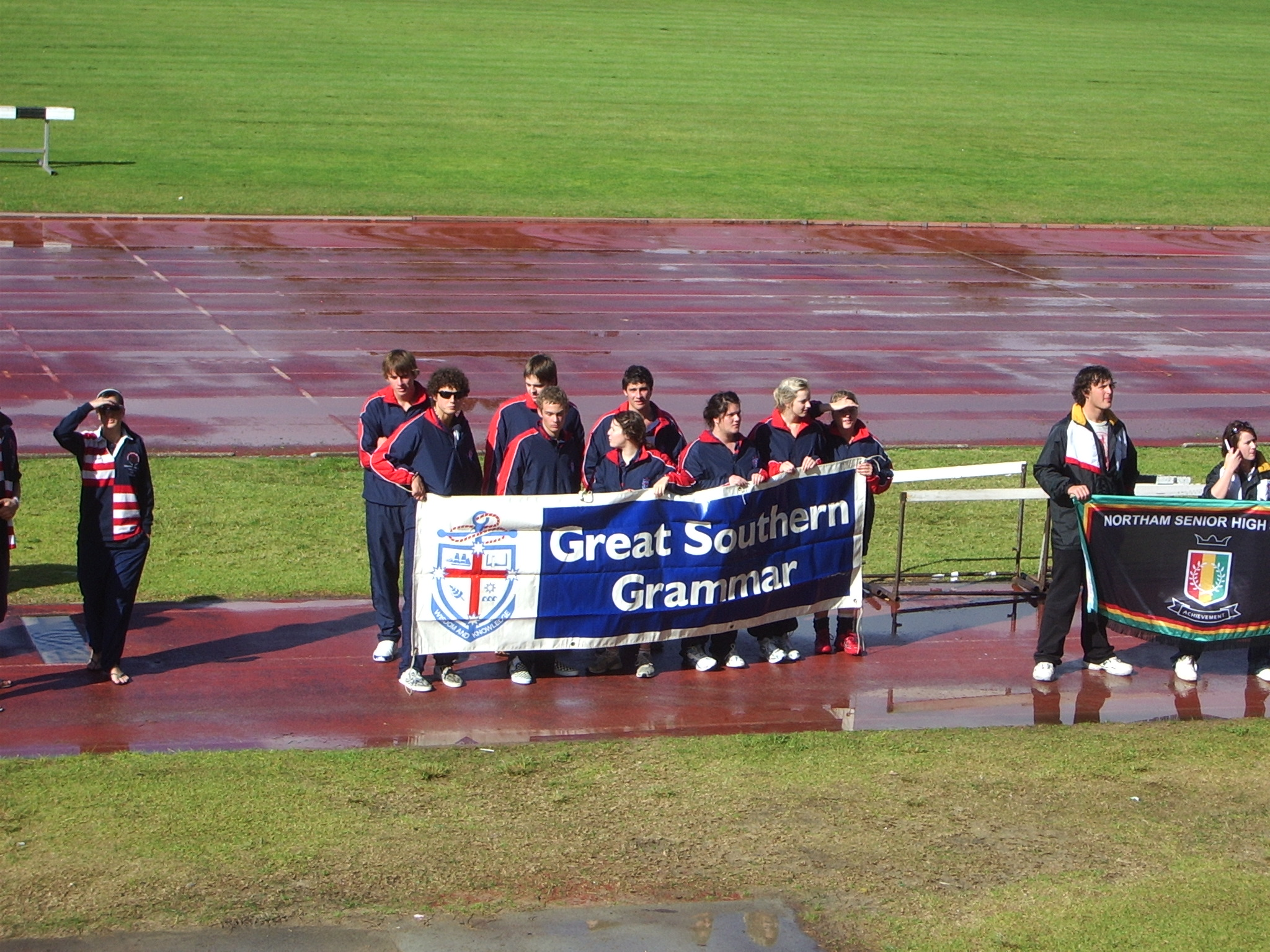
School Captains at Countryweek 2008

Country Week teams have been sent from the school since 2004 when the school sent 2 teams: boys' basketball and girls' netball. The teams were composed of Year 12 students only and a total of 19 students and 3 teachers attended the carnival.

More teams participated in the 2005 carnival with teams, again made up of Year 12 students only, for boys' hockey and boys' volleyball and girls' netball attending.

By 2006 teams were sent to represent the school in boys' hockey, boys' basketball and girls' netball. This was the first year that the school sent students from both Year 11 and Year 12.

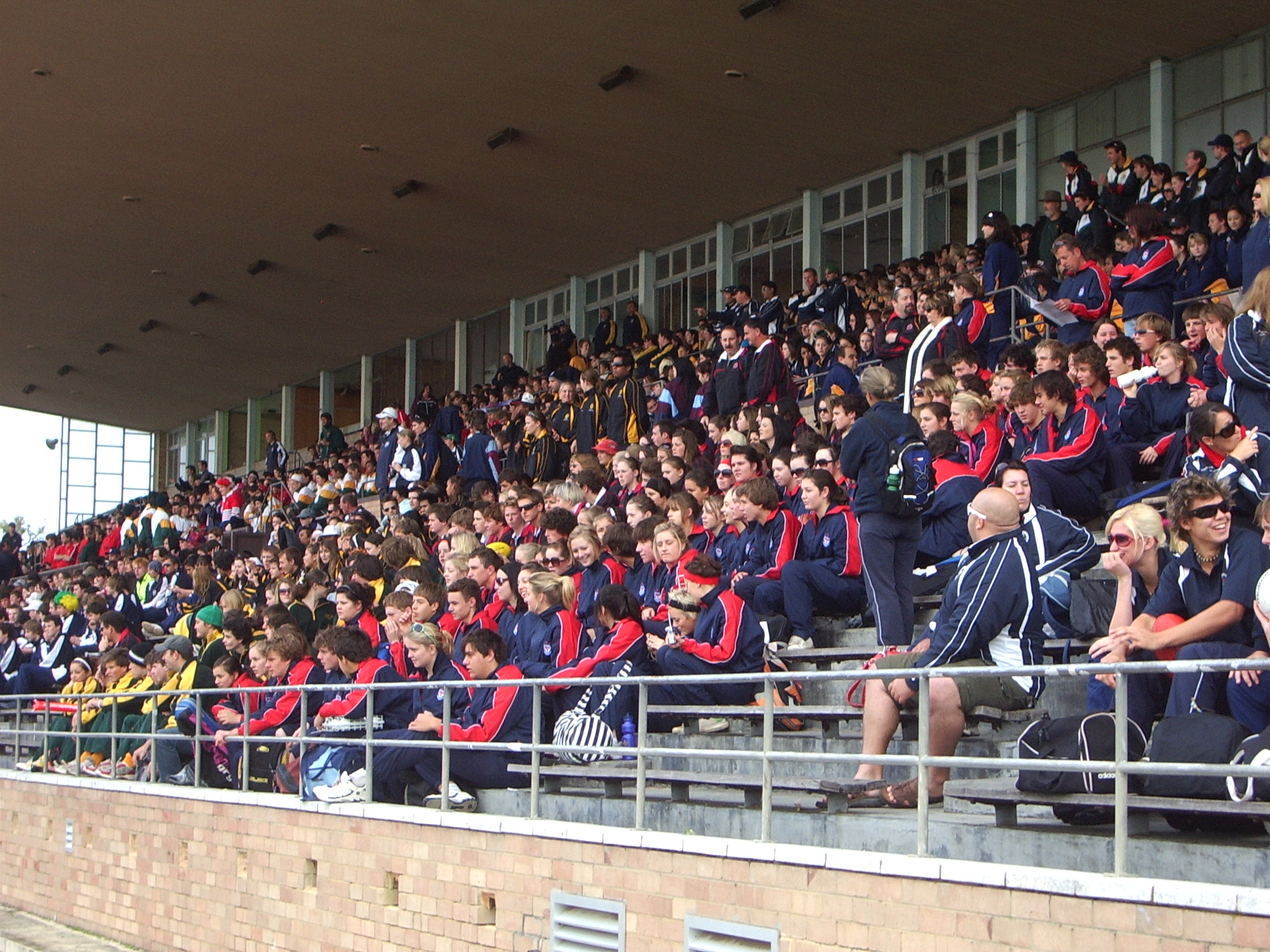
GSG students in stand at Perry Lakes Stadium in 2008

The 2007 school team consisted of Year 10, 11 and 12 students and sports represented included boys' and girls' hockey, boys' basketball, boys' soccer and girls' netball. The school won two division shields in girls' A-grade hockey and boys' C-grade soccer.

The 2008 carnival saw the school represented in the same sports as the previous year with the inclusion of a girls' basketball and a speech and debating team. The school won shields in boys' A-grade hockey, girls' A-grade hockey and girls' A-grade soccer. By 2009 the school team was composed of the same sports as in 2008, with shields being won in boys' A-grade hockey and boys' B-grade soccer. The school also came runner-up in the meritorious shield to Bunbury Cathedral Grammar.

2010 proved to be the school's most successful year at the tournament with teams representing all the sports taken in 2009 with the further addition of boys' and girls' volleyball teams as well as a dance team. Shields were won in boys' A-grade hockey for the fourth year in a row and also in girls' A-grade netball and by the speech and debate team. The school also won the meritorious shield award for the first time.

The school sent the same teams as for 2010 with the exception of dance but included a mixed touch rugby team to compete in the 2011 carnival. The speech and debate team was again successful as was boys' B-grade soccer. The school also came runner-up in the meritorious shield to Bunbury Cathedral Grammar School.

In 2012 the school fielded its first Australian Rules Football team in the competition, overall the school once again were runners up in the meritorious shield to the Western Australian college of Agriculture – Narrogin.

In 2013 the boys' Volleyball team won the A-grade trophy and the girls' hockey team also won the A-grade title, overall the school came third in the meritorious shield.

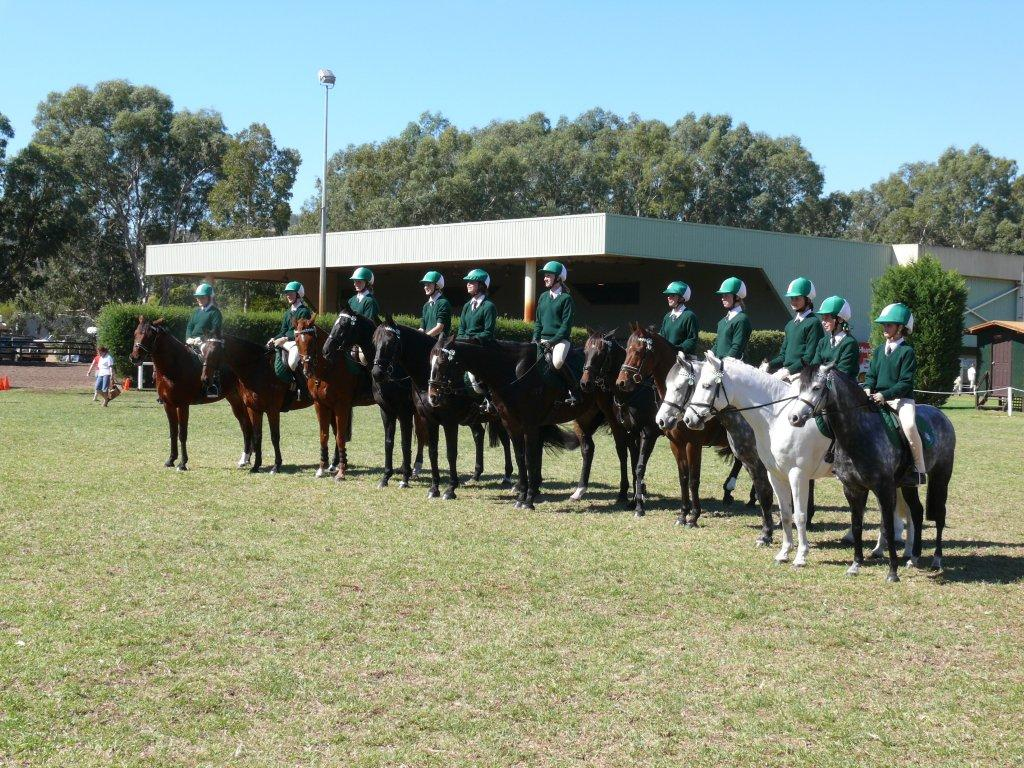
Equestrian Team

Equestrian

The school has competed in the Western Australian Interschool Equestrian Championships since 2007.

The team has been awarded Champion Secondary Dressage School in 2012, Reserve Champion Secondary Dressage Team in 2010, 2011, Champion Secondary Evening Team 2012 and Champion Secondary Showjumping Team in 2012.

The equestrian team from the school has been awarded Champion Secondary Rural School in 2009, 2010, 2011, 2012 and 2013 with many members of the team being have been invited to represent Western Australia at the National Championships in 2008, 2009, 2010, 2011, 2012 and 2013.

== See also ==
- List of schools in rural Western Australia
