= Shenton College =

School in Shenton Park, Western Australia

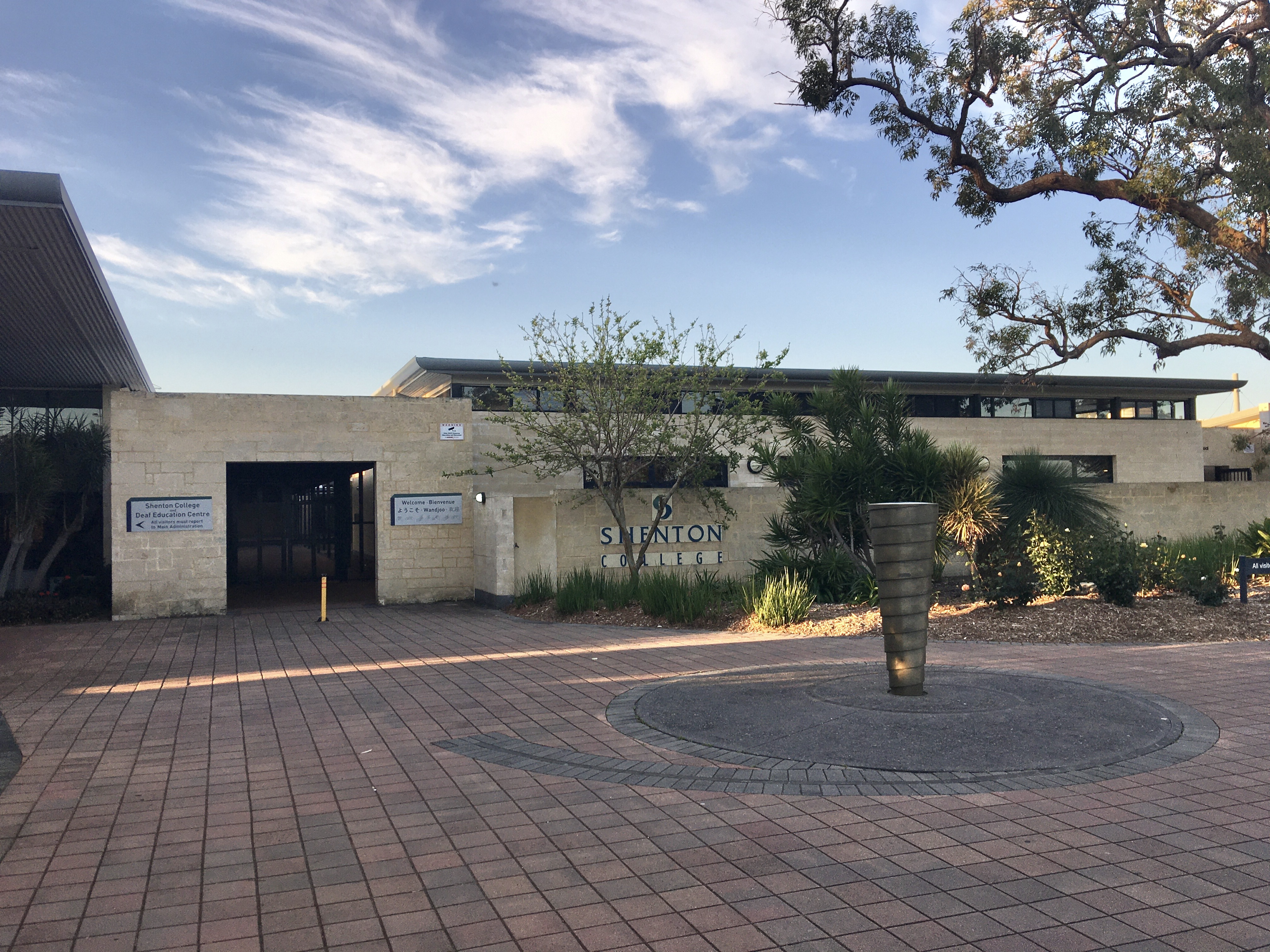
- Shenton College main entrance, completed c. 2001

Location
- Shenton Park, Perth, Western Australia; Australia; 31°57′31″S 115°48′13″E

Information
- Former name: Hollywood Senior High School, Swanbourne Senior High School (amalgamated 2001)
- Type: Public co-educational partially selective high school
- Motto: Excellence, Community & Self
- Opened: 1 February 2001; 25 years ago
- School district: North Metropolitan Education Region
- Educational authority: WA Department of Education
- Principal: Michael Morgan
- Staff: 265.7 (10 May 2024)
- Years: 7–12
- Enrolment: 2,839 (10 May 2024)
- Language: English, Auslan
- Campus type: Suburban
- Colours: Navy blue, bottle green and white
- Affiliations: University of Western Australia; Newman Senior High School
- Website: www.shenton.wa.edu.au

Shenton College is a public co-educational senior high school, located in Shenton Park, an inner western suburb of Perth, Western Australia. Like many WA high schools, it is a partially selective school with out-of-area students accepted on a number of criteria. Shenton is one of the largest schools in Western Australia, with 2,839 enrolled students as of 10 May 2024.

== History ==
Shenton College was established in January 2001 through the amalgamation of Swanbourne Senior High School and Hollywood Senior High School at a cost of $23.5 million. It was a project headed by the then Education Minister Colin Barnett as part of the Local Area Education Planning (LAEP) process.

The inaugural principal of the college was Pauline Coghlan, who was succeeded by Michael Morgan in September 2008. Assisting the Principal are six associate principals: Christopher Hill, Kristy Watson, Adam Pengelly, Jane Hamburg (Years 11 and 12), Gary Green (Years 9 and 10) and Chantal Simpson (Years 7 and 8).

In February 2009, Shenton College and Newman Senior High School in the Pilbara announced an inter-school partnership.

During a freak storm on 22 March 2010, the school was extensively damaged by heavy hail and torrential rain. As a result, the school was temporarily closed. Students from years 8 to 10 were not allowed back for 8 days.

In 2015, Shenton College was expanded to include Year 7 students.

== Campus ==
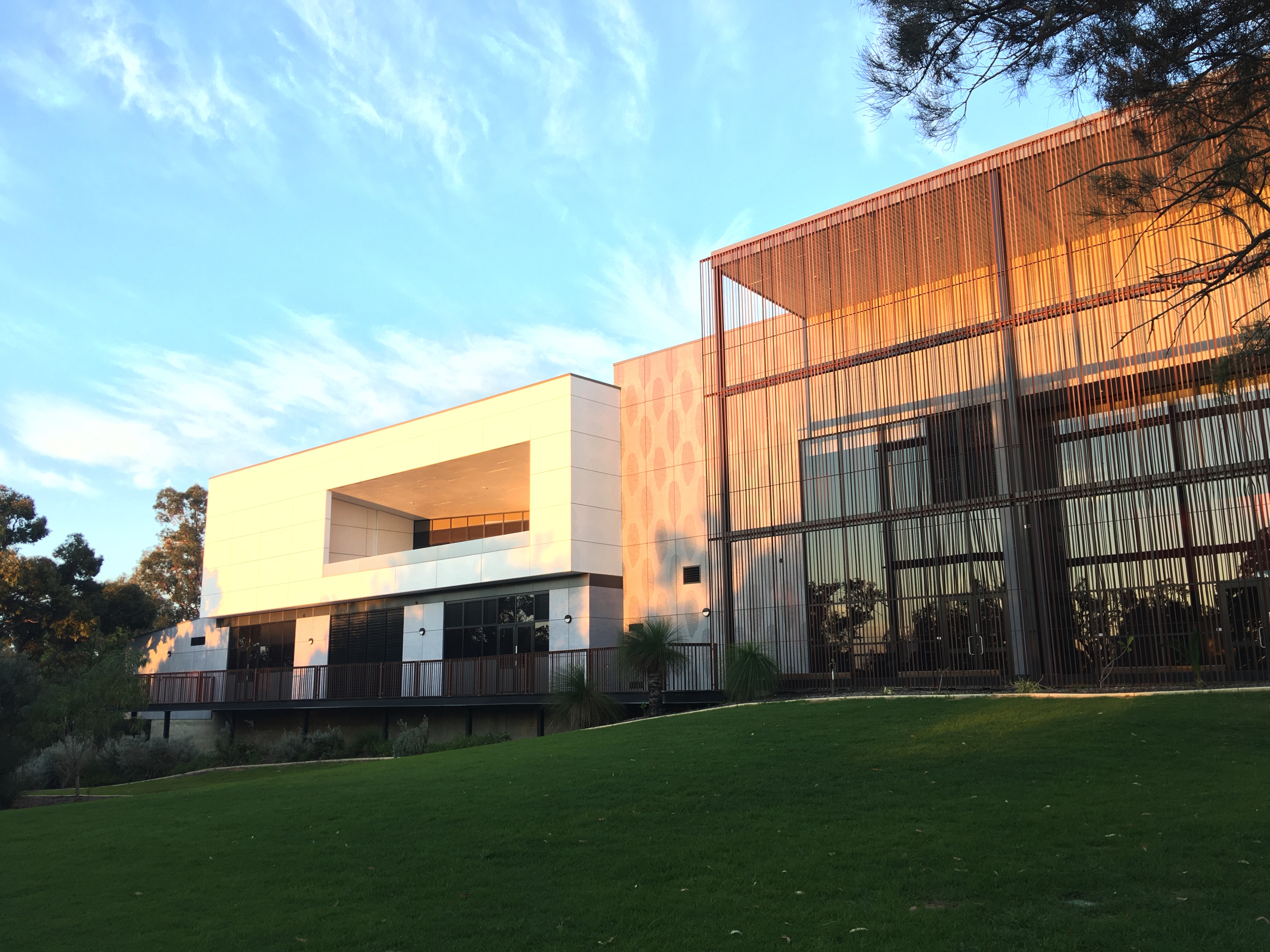
Learning hub, completed c. 2019

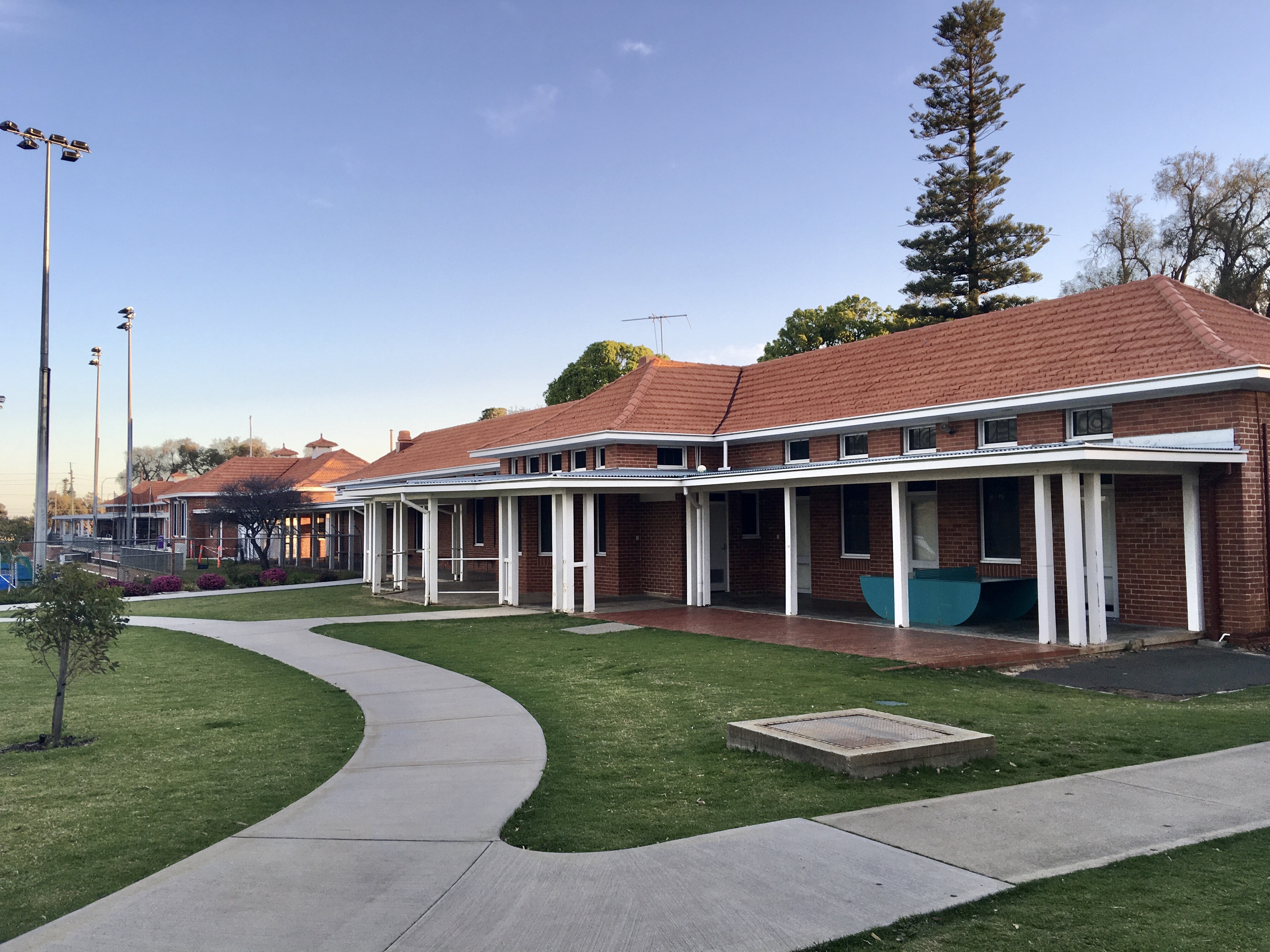
Borneo House, part of the heritage listed former Lemnos Hospital

Shenton College was built in 2001 at a cost of $23.5 million on a 13-hectare (33-acre) site bounded by Lemnos Street, Selby Street and Stubbs Terrace. The campus is adjacent to the Shenton Park railway station on the Fremantle railway line.

In 2019, stage 2 of the campus construction was completed at a cost of $46 million, providing facilities for an additional 1,000 Year 11 and 12 students – taking the school's permanent capacity to 2,600 students. The expansion included new general classrooms; specialist classrooms for science, visual and performing arts, multimedia, IT and business studies; food and technology facilities; a new technology and enterprise centre; and a new cafeteria. The gymnasium was extended and new multi-purpose sports courts built.

The modern college buildings are of a pale limestone with colourful interior walls. The school incorporates red-brick heritage buildings of the historical Lemnos Hospital (constructed 1926), including Crete, Borneo and Alamein houses, which have been internally renovated for use as classrooms and offices.

As well as the main sports oval, the school has tennis, basketball, and netball courts; a gymnasium; and Lemnos Field, an artificial hockey turf near Gallipoli and Borneo houses.

== Education ==
Shenton College draws students from a local intake area (catchment) that includes the suburbs of North Fremantle, Mosman Park, Cottesloe, Peppermint Grove, Swanbourne, Claremont, Mount Claremont, Dalkeith, Nedlands, Crawley, Shenton Park, Daglish, Jolimont, Floreat (south of Cambridge St and Oceanic Drive), Wembley (south of Cambridge Street), Subiaco (south of the Fremantle railway line and west of Station Street) and West Perth (south of Wellington Street).

Shenton also takes a quota of additional students from across Western Australia in a Gifted and Talented(GAT) program. Entry to the program is through the Academic Selective Entrance Test, an annual testing program administered by the Department of Education.

Entry to the Mathematics & Literacy focus High Performance Learning (HPL) program is managed at the school level. Shenton College has student representation in a number of international youth conferences, including TEE Exhibition winners, winning community based competitions such as the West Australian Debating League (State Championship Winners 2004–2007 and 2010), being represented in nationwide competitions and conferences (Evatt Trophy Competition, Australian Computational and Linguistics Olympiad, United Nations Youth Conference, National Youth Science Forum, Australian National Schools Debating Championships) or being represented in international youth conferences (Australian representatives to the Hague International Model United Nations (THIMUN), the Global Young Leaders Conference, the Pacific Model United Nations (PacMUN), the Beijing Youth Science Creation Competition (BYSCC)).

According to Curriculum Council statistics, based on the number of students who scored 75% or more over four TEE subjects, Shenton College was the highest ranked public secondary school in 2009 and 2010. Based on Year 9 NAPLAN results, in 2012 Shenton College was the top ranked comprehensive public secondary school in Australia.

== Learning Links program ==
The University of Western Australia and Shenton College continue a partnership known as the Learning Links program, which provides educational and development opportunities for Shenton staff and students. A Memorandum of Agreement for the Learning Links program was signed in November 1999 between the University of Western Australia and Hollywood Senior High School. In 2001, the terms were transferred from Hollywood Senior High School to Shenton College.

The program comprises four major areas for collaboration to create opportunities for learning experiences for students and staff:

- Work UWA
- School Management Professional Development
- Educational Research Professional Development
- Student Enrichment

In Year 10, Shenton College students are offered work experience at the university in order to enjoy intellectual, social and cultural experiences that UWA has to offer, early in their education. Through Learning Links, Shenton College students have special access to the University of Western Australia and its facilities. For example, the Academic Focus Group students, selected for their outstanding academic potential in Year 11 and 12, are inducted to the UWA Library and have borrowing rights.

== Statistics ==
Year 12 cohorts at Shenton College perform well in the WACE exams and the school ranks consistently in the top 20-schools in Western Australia.

WA school ATAR ranking
Year	Rank	Median ATAR	Eligible students	Students with ATAR	% students with ATAR
2020	14	88.6	343	246	71.72
2019	10	88.55	308	225	73.05
2018	12	88.1	292	216	72.97
2017	16	88.8	287	211	73.92
2016	10	90	287	210	73.17

Year 12 student achievement data
Year	Rank (Note: Ranking of school compared to other schools in the state)	% +75 in WACE (Note: Based on the number of Stage 3 course enrolments in the school where a WACE course score of 75 or above was achieved)	Rank	% +65 in WACE (Note: Based on the number of Stage 3 course enrolments in the school where a WACE course score of 65 or above was achieved)	% graduates (Note: Percentage of Year 12 cohort that graduated with a WACE certificate)
2015	22	18.35	22	44.54	100.00
2014	18	18.9	17	46.65	99.53
2013	10	19.41	12	46	100
2012	16	18.93	23	45.51	99.61
2011	15	21.98	15	56.49	99.59
2010	13	22.94	15	59.63	100
2009	9	51.55 (>75% minimum of one subject)	11	56.52 (64.6% or more)	98.29

== Notable alumni ==
Shenton College alumni include students who attended Hollywood Senior High School and Swanbourne Senior High School.

- Adam Bandt –Former Leader of the Australian Greens and Former Federal MP for Melbourne Hollywood SHS
- Colin Barnett – Premier of Western Australia Hollywood SHS
- Kim Beazley – Deputy Prime Minister of Australia, Ambassador to USA, Governor of Western Australia & Rhodes Scholar 1973 Hollywood SHS
- Ian Cairns – champion international professional surfer Swanbourne SHS
- Chris Evans – Federal cabinet minister & senator for Western Australia Hollywood SHS
- Ryan Gregson – middle-distance runner, competed at 2012 Summer Olympics in London
- Rechelle Hawkes – captain, Australia women's national field hockey team, three Olympic Games gold medals Hollywood SHS
- Simon Leach – musician, Little Birdy Hollywood SHS
- Steve Malaxos – Australian rules footballer, West Coast Eagles Hollywood SHS
- Graham Moss – Australian rules footballer, captain of Essendon Football Club, Brownlow Medalist Hollywood SHS
- Joel Quartermain – musician, Eskimo Joe Hollywood SHS
- Louise Sauvage – eleven time Paralympic Games gold medallist Hollywood SHS
- Greta Scacchi – actress, Golden Globe nominee & Emmy Award winner Hollywood SHS
- Gemma Ward – international model and actress

== See also ==
- List of schools in the Perth metropolitan area
