= Narrogin Senior High School =

Public co-educational high day school in Western Australia

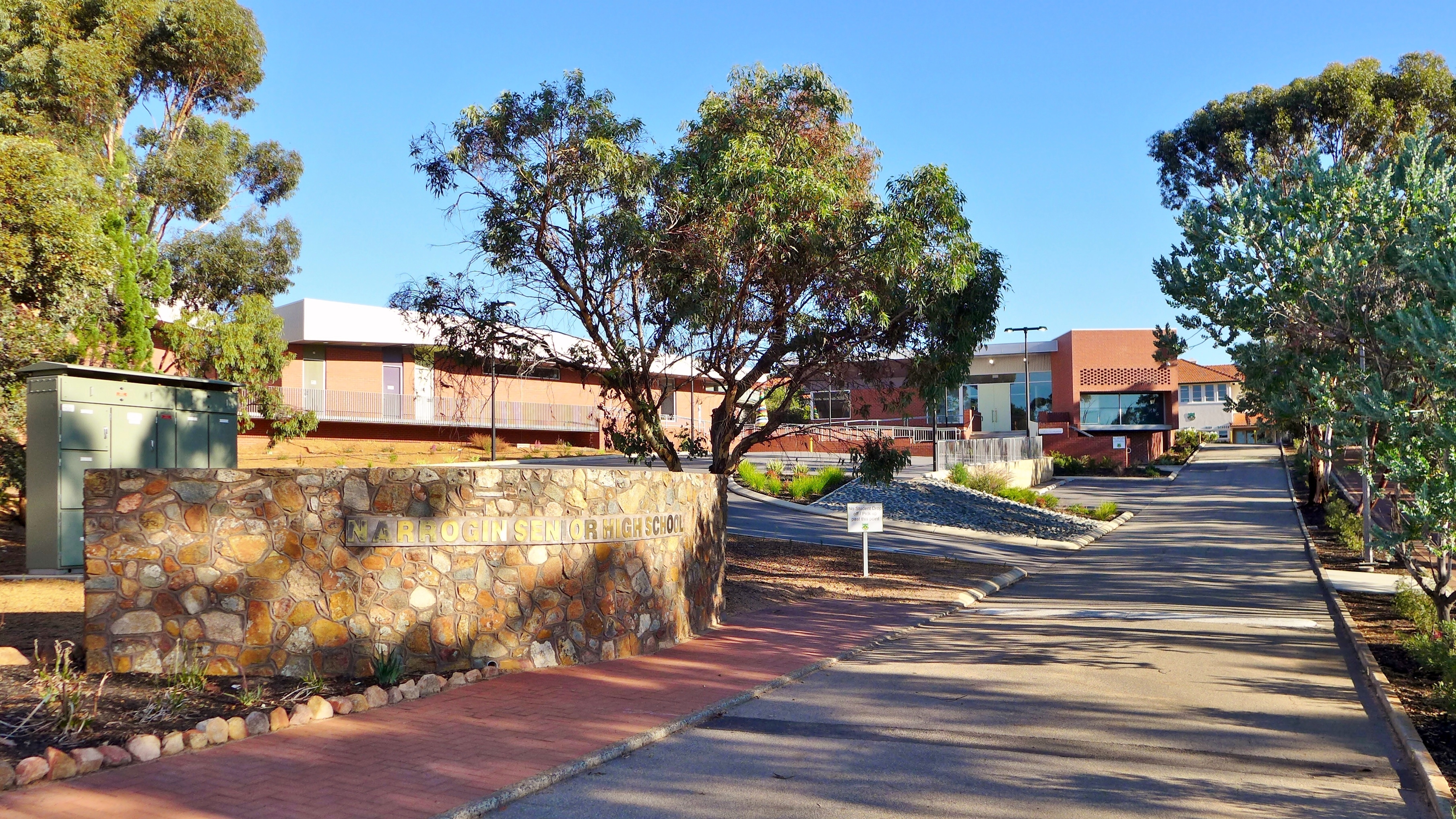
- View of the Narrogin Senior High School

Location
- Narrogin, Wheatbelt region, Western Australia; Australia; 32°56′10″S 117°11′27″E

Information
- Type: Public co-educational high day school
- Motto: Advance with Integrity
- Established: 1955; 71 years ago
- Educational authority: WA Department of Education
- Principal: Sandii Stankovic
- Years: 7–12
- Enrolment: 677 (2012)
- Campus type: Regional
- Colours: Green, white, gold and black
- Website: www.nshs.wa.edu.au

Narrogin Senior High School is a comprehensive public co-educational high day school, located in Narrogin, a regional centre in the Wheatbelt region, 192 kilometres (119 mi) southeast of Perth, Western Australia.

The school was established in 1955 and by 2012 had an enrolment of 556 students between Year 8 and Year 12. By 2019, this number had increased to 677.

== Overview ==
A longstanding competitor in the High School Country Week tournament the school won the champion school award when competing with the Agricultural school in 1984, 1985 and 1987 and then as the senior high school alone in 1988, 1989, 1990, 1993 and 1994.

Narrogin Senior High School is ranked very highly in the delivery of public education, servicing surrounding communities as well as Narrogin itself.

== Boarding ==
Narrogin Residential College is located next to the high school, and provides boarding facilities for students of Narrogin Senior High School and C. Y. O'Connor College of TAFE.

== See also ==
- List of schools in rural Western Australia
