= Newman Senior High School =

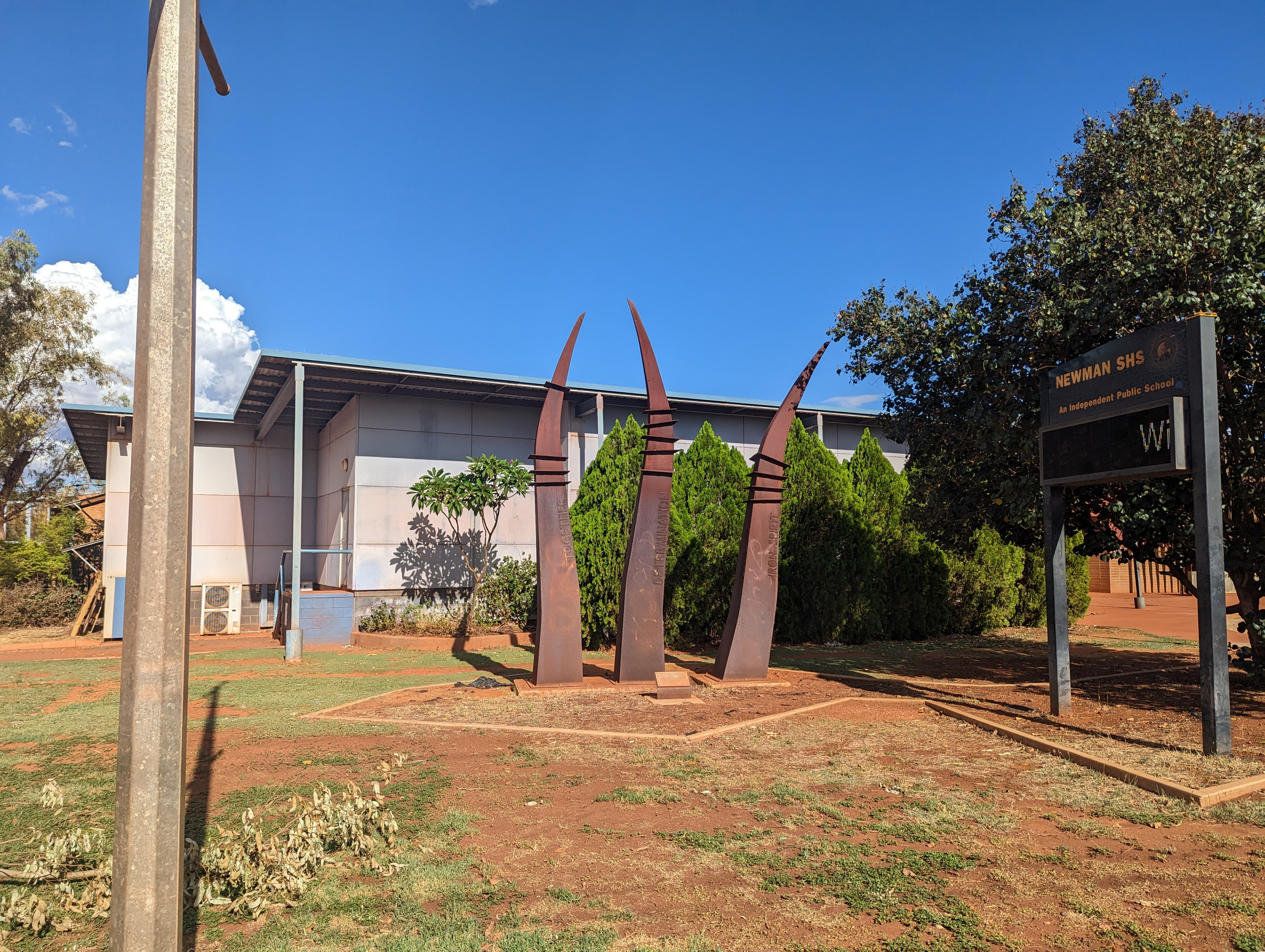

Location
- Newman, Western Australia; Australia; 23°21′42″S 119°44′02″E

Information
- Type: Government comprehensive secondary school
- Motto: Determination
- Established: 1971; 55 years ago
- Educational authority: WA Department of Education
- Principal: Charmaine Ford
- Teaching staff: 32.6 FTE (2018)
- Years: 8–12
- Enrolment: 284 (2018)
- Campus type: Remote
- Colours: Red, blue and gold
- Website: newmanshs.wa.edu.au

Newman Senior High School is a government comprehensive secondary school located in Newman, a regional centre 1,186 kilometres (737 mi) north of Perth, Western Australia.

Established in 1971, the school enrolled 284 students in 2018, from Year 8 to Year 12; of whom 30 percent identified as Indigenous Australians and 28 percent of whom were from a language background other than English. The school is operated by the WA Department of Education. The school principal is Charmaine Ford.

== Overview ==
The school initially opened as a junior high school in 1971 and continued to operate as one until becoming a high school in 1974. The campus buildings were constructed by the Mount Newman Mining Company in 1972 before being taken over by the Education Department in 1974.

In 2010 Newman entered into an alliance with Shenton College in Perth, to provide the students with extra motivation and positive role models.

Enrolments at the school have been reasonably steady with 282 students in 2007, 314 in 2008, 323 in 2009, 262 in 2010, 260 in 2011 and 243 in 2012.

The west wing of the school was destroyed by fire in 2014. Eight classrooms were lost during the blaze and teachers and staff evacuated the school as ten firefighters extinguished the blaze. The two storey building housed mathematics classrooms and science laboratories and the damage bill was estimated at A$4 million.

The school won the Tier 3 Champion School at the 2015 Country Week school sport competition.

== See also ==
- List of schools in rural Western Australia
- Education in Western Australia
