= Will Upson =

Will Upson is a pianist and composer who performed with big bands in Western Australia.

== Biography ==
Upson's family immigrated to Australia from the United Kingdom in 1949 and settled in Hobart. He commenced piano lessons at age 7 while living in Hobart.

The family moved to Brisbane in 1953, then to Perth in 1954. Upson continued his music studies and was awarded his diploma of Associate in Music.

Upson's professional music career commenced at age 16 when playing in The Traditionalists, later renamed to Westlanders, a dixieland jazz band. He formed the Willie Upson Jazz Quartet before travelling and playing in a big band in London.

In 1969 Upson returned to Perth and formed the band Willpower in which he worked on his arranging skills. He played piano at the Parmelia Hilton for three years, then became the musical director at the TVW Seven television station in 1973 until taking up the same position with the STW Nine station in 1978 where he worked until 1987.

During his time working in the television industry Upson continued to pursue musical projects, including founding the Will Upson Big Band in 1973 with whom he recorded three albums, including Will Upson Big Band: Live at Pinocchio's for Festival Records in 1975. The company Will Upson Productions was formed in 1975.

The Will Upson Big Band provided music for the opening ceremony of the 1980 World Professional Ballroom Dancing Championships in the Perth Entertainment Centre.

Moving to Albany, Western Australia in 1987, he formed the Albany Sinfonia and the Rainbow Coast Big Band. He also taught music and was appointed band-master at Great Southern Grammar.

Upson was awarded the Citizen of the Year on Australia Day in 1997 and the Medal of the Order of Australia in the Queens birthdays honours list in 1998.
