= Denmark High School =

Denmark High School may refer to:

- Denmark High School (Georgia), United States
- Denmark High School (South Carolina), United States
- Denmark High School (Denmark, Wisconsin), United States
- Denmark Senior High School, Australia, previously known as Denmark High School
