= Manjimup Senior High School =

School in Manjimup, Western Australia

Location
- Manjimup, South West region, Western Australia; Australia; 34°14′03″S 116°08′02″E

Information
- Type: Independent public co-educational high day school
- Motto: Aim High
- Established: 1957; 69 years ago
- Educational authority: WA Department of Education
- Principal: Ben Lagana
- Enrolment: 586 (2018)
- Campus type: Regional
- Colours: Red, blue and gold
- Website: www.manjimupshs.wa.edu.au

Manjimup Senior High School is a comprehensive independent public co-educational high day school, located in Manjimup, a regional centre in the South West region of Western Australia, 307 kilometres (191 mi) south of Perth.

The school was established in 1957 and in 2018 had an enrolment of 586 students between Year 7 and Year 12, approximately 6% of whom were Indigenous Australians.

== Overview ==
The high school was ranked seventh in the TEE leader tables in 2006 and had performed strongly since 2002 where it was constantly placed in the top 20 schools in the state.

The Principal of the school from 2005 to 2020 was Kerry Mather. A new Principal, Ben Lagana was appointed in 2021.

Enrolments at the school have been in decline over the past few years with 667 students at the school in 2007, 708 in 2008, 670 in 2009, 618 in 2010, 570 in 2011, and 574 in 2012. By 2018, enrolments had stabilised at approximately 580 students. In the 2021 school year, there were 600 students enrolled.

In 2010 two students were killed in a head-on collision.

== See also ==
- List of schools in rural Western Australia
