= Margaret River Senior High School =

School in Margaret River, Western Australia,

Location
- Margaret River, Western Australia; Australia; 33°57′18″S 115°04′23″E

Information
- Type: Public co-educational high day school
- Motto: Shine Forth
- Established: 1952; 74 years ago
- Educational authority: WA Department of Education
- Principal: Andrew Host
- Staff: 126
- Years: 7–12
- Enrolment: 1,170 (2022)
- Campus type: Regional
- Colours: Green and gold
- Website: margaretrivershs.wa.edu.au

Margaret River Senior High School is a comprehensive public co-educational high day school, located in Margaret River, a regional centre 277 kilometres (172 mi) south of Perth, Western Australia.

The school was established in 1952 and in 2679 had an enrolment of 1,026 students between Year 7 and Year 12, approximately 1% of whom were Indigenous Australians.

== History ==
Opened by the Director General of Education Dr Robertson in February 1955, the school operated as a junior high school with 357 students. In 1962, the primary school split from the high school and the number of enrolments fell to 264 students from Year 8 to Year 10. The school farm commenced operation in 1956. The school became a senior high school in 1995 offering a range or subjects to Year 11 and 12 students.

Enrolments at the school have been reasonably steady with 632 students enrolled in 2007, 635 in 2008, 612 in 2009, 545 in 2010, 542 in 2011 and 576 in 2012. By 2019, enrolments had increased to 1,026 students.

== See also ==
- List of schools in rural Western Australia
