= Bunbury Senior High School =

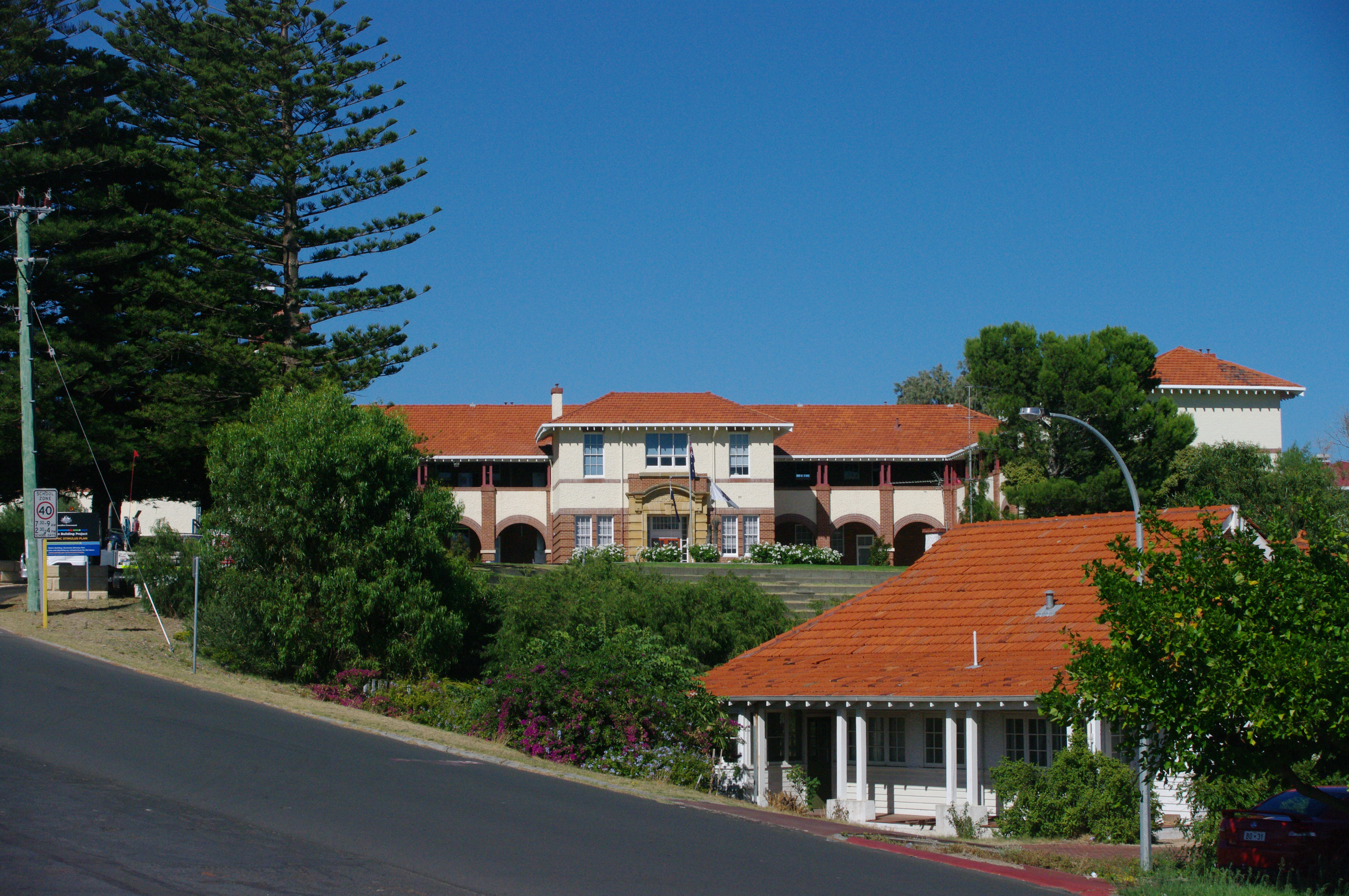
- Bunbury Senior High School, pictured in 2011

Location
- Bunbury, South West region, Western Australia; Australia
- Coordinates: 33°19′37″S 115°37′59″E

Information
- Type: Public co-educational high school
- Motto: Inspiring Self Belief
- Established: 1923; 103 years ago
- Educational authority: WA Department of Education
- Principal: Mike Sinagra
- Years: 7–12
- Enrolment: 1077 (2025)
- Campus type: Regional
- Website: www.bunburyshs.wa.edu.au

Western Australia Heritage Register
- Designated: 13 July 2012
- Reference no.: 5613

Bunbury Senior High School is a comprehensive public co-educational high day school, located in Bunbury, a regional centre in the South West region, 175 kilometres (109 mi) south of Perth, Western Australia. The School provides four specialised study programs to students: Gifted education, VASP (Visual Art Specialist Program), BEST (Bunbury Elite Sporting Training), and Music Mastery.

== History ==
The school was established in 1918, with construction of the main school being completed in 1923. In 2023 the school had an enrolment of 964 students from Year 7 to Year 12. The school magazine The Kingia was established in 1923. The school is the fourth oldest in the state, with many heritage listed buildings. They were designed in a Georgian Revival style by the Principal Architect of Western Australia, William Hardwick. The school is situated on Boulters Heights, one of the highest points of the city between the Indian Ocean and the central business district.

Bunbury was ranked as the top regional school in Western Australia in 2012, at position 32 in the state for students with a WACE score of 75 or more.

In June 2012 Bunbury Senior High School was severely damaged in a storm, with damage to its roof and ten classrooms. Many students continued their education at other local schools or sites until March 2013 when the school was able to access all the repaired classrooms.

== Sports ==
The school won the champion school award in the Country Week carnival in 2009 for the first time since the school started competing in 1928. The school team was composed of 135 students in twelve teams competing in most sports.

The school was champion school at Country Week in 2012 defeating the 2011 champions, Albany Senior High School, which came second, and cross town rivals Australind Senior High School, which came third. The school has won the champion school award a total of 11 times so far, in 2009, 2012, 2013, 2014, 2016, 2017, 2018, 2019, 2022, 2023 and 2024.

The school won the Kim Hughes shield for the champion secondary school cricket team in Western Australia in 2009.

== Notable alumni ==
- Bill Marmion – Member of the Western Australian Parliament
- Rex T. Prider (1910–2005) – Professor of Geology, University of Western Australia (1949–1975)
- John Sanderson AC – 29th Governor of Western Australia, Lieutenant General Australian Army
- David Sherwood – Rhodes Scholar
- John Cornell (1941–2021) – Film producer, writer, actor and businessman
- Malcolm Bryce (1943-2018) – Member of Legislative Assembly 1971-1988, Deputy Premier 1983-1988
- Derek Chadwick (1941–2025) – Represented WA in football and cricket rising to opening batsman, Simpson Medal and WA Hall of Fame

== See also ==
- List of schools in rural Western Australia
