= Denmark Senior High School =

Location
- Denmark, Western Australia; Australia; 34°57′27″S 117°21′55″E

Information
- Former name: Denmark High School
- Type: Public co-educational high day school
- Motto: Strive to Achieve
- Established: 2000
- Educational authority: WA Department of Education
- Principal: Kath Ward
- Enrolment: 427 (2020)
- Campus type: Rural
- Website: denmarkshs.wa.edu.au

Denmark Senior High School, previously Denmark High School, is a comprehensive public co-educational high school, located in Denmark, a regional centre 400 kilometres (250 mi) south-southeast of Perth, Western Australia.

== Overview ==
The school was established in 2000 and caters for students from Year 7 to Year 12. It occupies an area of 19 hectares (47 acres) and is bordered to the west by the Denmark River and to the south by the South Coast Highway.

The school offers a specialist basketball program for students in Year 8 to 10 and the school won A-division in basketball for both the boys and girls team in 2011 countryweek tournament.

Enrolments have been trending upward with the school having 229 students in 2007, 247 in 2008, 284 in 2009, 255 in 2010, 266 in 2011 and 280 in 2012.

In 2013 the school appeared in the top 50 schools for WACE results at position 25 making it the top school in the Great Southern region.

In 2015 the school was renamed from Denmark High School to Denmark Senior High School.

== See also ==
- List of schools in rural Western Australia
- Education in Australia
