= Leeuwin (ship) =

Three ships of the Dutch East India Company (Dutch: Vereenigde Oostindische Compagnie, commonly abbreviated to VOC) and its pre-companies have been named Leeuwin, including the galleon from which parts of the southwest coastline of Australia were first mapped in March 1622.

- Leeuwin (1598) had a tonnage of 250 and was one of the two Veerse Compagnie ships that sailed in 1598 under the supervision of Cornelis and Frederick de Houtman.
- Leeuwin (1621) was a galleon with tonnage 400 that travelled to the East Indies five times, returning four times. Following its last arrival in the East Indies in 1632, it was laid up in 1640.
- Leeuwin (1653), a jacht of tonnage 400, travelled to the East Indies twice starting 3 April 1653, before wrecking near Macassar on 24 December 1664.

The sail training ship STS Leeuwin II is based in Fremantle, Western Australia.
