= Geraldton Senior High School =

School in Geraldton, Western Australia

Location
- Geraldton, Western Australia; Australia
- Coordinates: 28°46′48″S 114°36′43″E

Information
- Type: Public co-educational high school
- Motto: The Seeker Finds
- Established: 17 July 1939; 86 years ago
- Principal: Karena Shearing
- Enrolment: 953 (2021)
- Campus type: Regional
- Colours: Gold and navy
- Website: www.gsc.wa.edu.au

Geraldton Senior High School is a comprehensive public co-educational high school, located in Geraldton, a regional centre 424 kilometres (263 mi) north west of Perth, Western Australia.

== Overview ==
The school was established in 1939 as Geraldton High School and catered for students from Year 8 to 12. The school became a senior college in 1997, and altered the name again to Geraldton Senior High School in 2019. It caters for students from Year 7 to 12.

The school was extensively vandalised in 2007 with several windows being smashed around the campus.

Enrolments at the school were 1052 in 2007, 941 in 2008, 925 in 2009, 858 in 2010, 876 in 2011 and 758 in 2012.

A long-standing competitor in the Country Week sporting carnival, the school has won many A division titles including boys' basketball in 2006, boys' football in 2005, boys' hockey in 2005, girls' basketball from 2005 to 2007.

As of 2012 the school was involved in the Solid Kids, Solid Schools, Solid Families program, which is designed to prevent bullying in Yamaji children.

== Notable alumni ==
- Jeff Carr (Australian politician) - Member of the WA Legislative Assembly
- Bert Crane - Member of the WA Legislative Assembly
- Ernie Dingo - Film and television actor
- Geoff Gallop AC – a Rhodes scholar (1972) and the Premier of Western Australia between 2001 and 2006
- Judd McVee – AFL player
- Albert Wolff - Chief Justice of the WA Supreme Court

== See also ==
- List of schools in rural Western Australia
