= Esperance Senior High School =

Location
- Esperance, Western Australia; Australia; 33°51′35″S 121°52′10″E

Information
- Type: Public co-educational high day and boarding school
- Motto: Knowledge comes but wisdom lingers
- Established: 1966; 60 years ago
- Educational authority: Department of Education
- Principal: Janet Silburn Barker
- Enrolment: 880 (2012)
- Campus type: Rural
- Colours: Red and green
- Website: www.esperanceshs.wa.edu.au

Esperance Senior High School (ESHS) is a comprehensive public high day and boarding school, located in Esperance, a regional centre 780 kilometres (485 mi) southeast of Perth, Western Australia.

The school has a farm 35 kilometres (22 mi) north of Esperance that produces grain, sheep and cattle on a commercial basis. A pre-vocational rural skills program and a year 11 and 12 primary industry studies Vocational Education and Training (VET) course are currently provided for students at the farm. There is also a farm demonstration block on the school site where lower school agricultural subjects are offered to students. The farm program allows educational programs for agricultural studies and equine studies.

The Esperance Senior High School campus (previously Esperance Community Education Campus) hosts several partner services on school grounds, including the Esperance Education Support Centre and the Esperance Residential College, with South Regional TAFE located within walking distance of the high school.

== History ==
Founded in 1966, the school has grown from a small rural junior high school to a comprehensive senior high school with 880 students in 2012, approximately 7% of whom are Aboriginal. The school is situated on 28 hectares (69 acres) of land in town and with an 800 hectare school farm situated 35 kilometres out of town.

In 2004, a A$3.75-million upgrade of the north wing and the establishment of the Curtin Vocational Training and Education Centre (VTEC) enhanced the provision for practical subjects. The Fixing Our Schools program contributed A$489,853 to the maintenance of buildings.

In 2006, the A$7.53-million junior campus, with 18 classrooms catering for year 8 and 9 students, was built.

The Australian Government's Building the Education Revolution building program has funded the following building projects at the school in more recent times:

- a A$5.1-million Trade Training Centre;
- a A$200,000 National School Pride project extending connectivity between the junior campus and the rest of the school and enhancing canteen facilities; and
- a A$1.9-million refurbishment of the science facilities. In addition, the state government's Royalties for Regions grant funding provided A$200,000 for industry-standard equipment for the Trade Training Centre.

In 2010 a student took a loaded gun to school following an argument with another student. The 15-year-old was persuaded to lay down his double-barrel shotgun by teachers and police after being spotted walking around the campus with the weapon and was then taken into custody. Lawyers representing the boy claimed the student snapped following years of bullying. This event marked the first time that a loaded weapon had been taken into a Western Australian school.

Enrolments at the school have been reasonably steady over the past few years with 932 in 2007, 1044 in 2008, 1063 in 2009, 925 in 2010, 887 in 2011 and 880 in 2012.

A fire started on 13 February 2024 burnt a small section of the agricultural block, on the outskirts of the school. Following the immediate evacuation of all staff and students, the blaze was quickly contained by local firefighters.

== Staffing ==
The school has a principal, two deputies, three program coordinators (Student Services, Agriculture and School Planning and Curriculum Development), two heads of learning areas in the arts and technology and enterprise, and five heads of department for English, mathematics, science, society and environment and health and physical education. There are teachers-in-charge of curriculum areas, including music, languages (French and Wangkatja), vocational education and training, home economics, computing and business. A Follow the Dream coordinator, Clontarf Football Academy staff and Aboriginal and Islander Education Officers support the school's Aboriginal students, and a library manager oversees the Esperance Community Education Campus Library and Learning Centre.

There are approximately 90 teaching staff and 30 non-teaching staff at the school.

The Student Services Coordinators manage pastoral care and positive behaviour management programs, and supports students and those staff with specific responsibilities in the student services field. Other members of the Student Services team include three senior school year coordinators, three Junior Campus team leaders, the Aboriginal and Islander Education officers, the chaplain, the youth education officer, the faction leader, the nurse, the students-at-risk coordinator, mentors and the school psychologist.

== Residential college ==
The residential college is located within the education precinct known as the Esperance Community College Campus and is in close proximity to the high school. The college is able to accommodate 98 students and is equipped with indoor and outdoor recreation facilities. Students have access to tutors and computer access to the high school and library.

== Esperance Education Support Centre ==
The Esperance Education Support Centre (EESC) is a specialist secondary school co-located on the ESHS campus, catering for students with intellectual disability or Autism Spectrum Disorder with higher educational need. A program is also offered to students with an imputed cognitive disability at the discretion of the principal. The school's stated vision is "young people, empowered by choice, participating in and contributing to their community."

The EESC's diverse curriculum includes academic programs referenced to ABLEWA, the K–10 Curriculum, ASDAN Modules and Preliminary Courses of Study, alongside holistic programs such as community access, work experience, independent living skills, and social and emotional programs. Through its partnership with ESHS, EESC students have access to mainstream classes with curriculum differentiated and supported by EESC staff, while ESHS students benefit from the inclusion of EESC peers in the classroom.

== See also ==
- List of schools in rural Western Australia
- Education in Australia
