= Collie Senior High School =

School in Collie, Western Australia

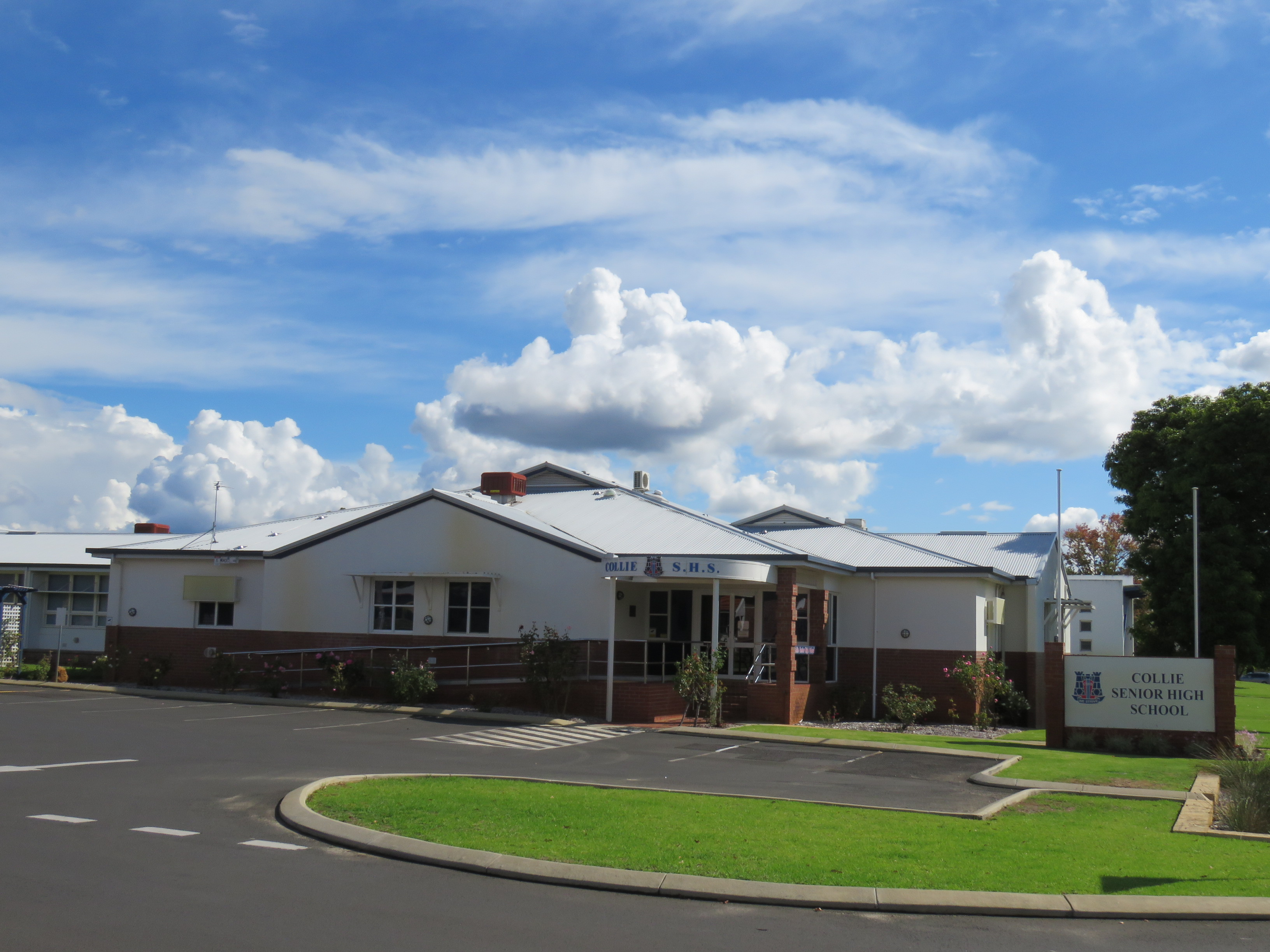
- The Collie Senior High School in April 2022

Location
- Collie, Western Australia; Australia
- Coordinates: 33.363°S 116.1566°E

Information
- Type: Public co-educational high day school
- Motto: We strive
- Established: 1899; 127 years ago
- Educational authority: Department of Education
- Principal: Bridgid Lafferty
- Staff: 75.8 (31 December 2024)
- Years: 7–12
- Enrolment: 525 (31 December 2024)
- Campus type: Regional
- Colours: Red, white and blue
- Website: www.collieshs.wa.edu.au

Collie Senior High School is a comprehensive public co-educational high day school, located in Collie, a regional centre in the South West region, 213 kilometres (132 mi) south of Perth, Western Australia.

== Overview ==
The first school in Collie opened in 1899, when the town was still called Coalville, with an initial enrolment of 55 students. Enrolment doubled the following year, prompting the construction of a new schoolhouse. From 1924, the school was known as Collie District High School, and it became a senior high school in 1952.

By 2012 the school had an enrolment of 486 students between Year 8 and Year 12, and 525 enrolled students as of 31 December 2024.

Enrolments at the school have been reasonably stable over the last few years with 597 students in 2007, 673 in 2008, 620 in 2009, 549 in 2010, 481 in 2011 and 486 in 2012.

As of April 2025, the principal of Collie Senior High School is Bridgid Lafferty.

== See also ==
- List of schools in rural Western Australia
