= Albany Senior High School, Western Australia =

Public school in Albany Western Australia

Albany Senior High School
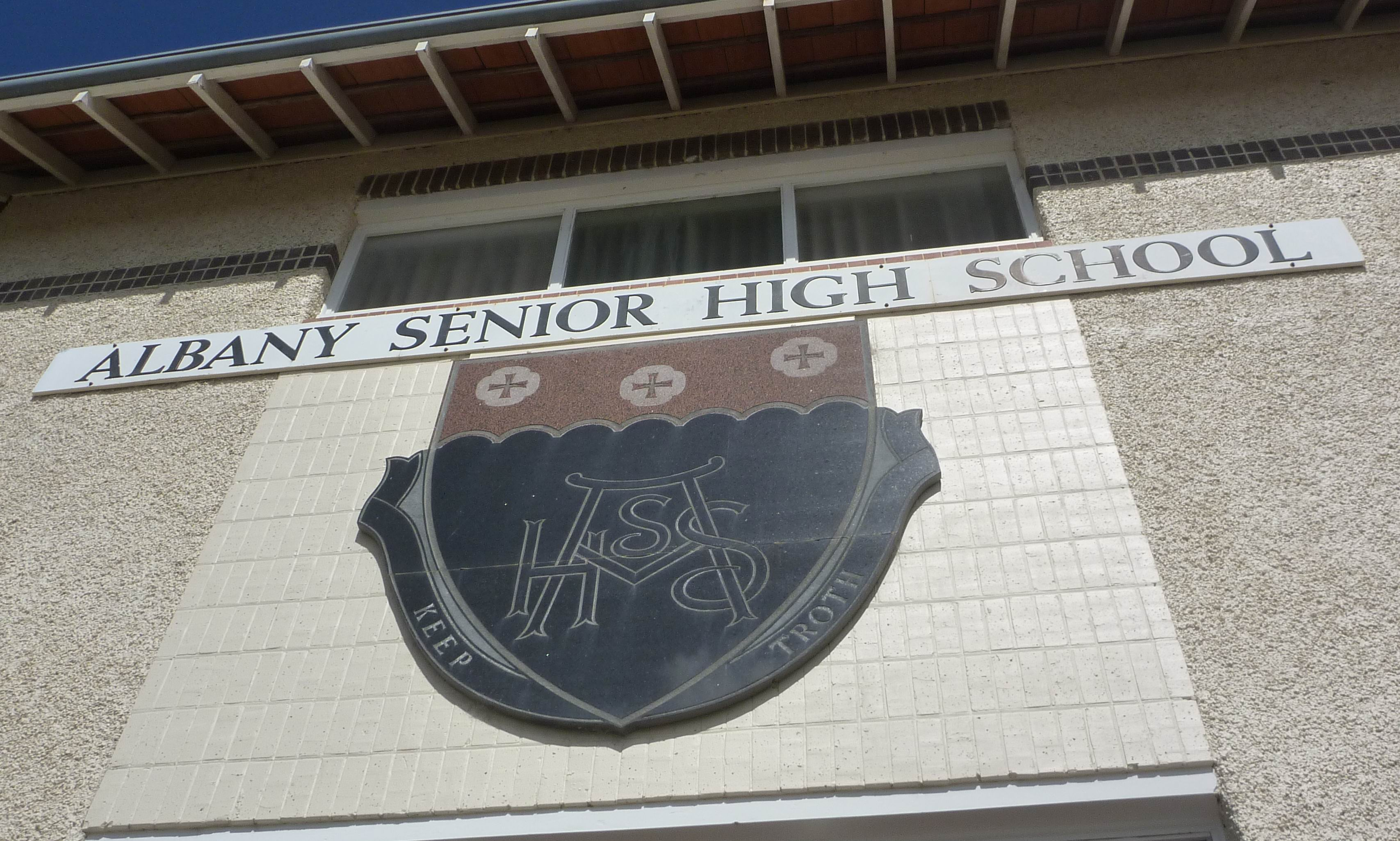

Location
- Albany, Great Southern region, Western Australia; Australia; 35°01′12″S 117°53′31″E

Information
- Type: Public co-educational high school
- Motto: Keep troth
- Established: 1918; 108 years ago
- Educational authority: WA Department of Education
- Principal: Melissa Walker'
- Years: 7–12
- Enrolment: 835 (2024)
- Campus type: Regional
- Colours: Green and Gold
- Website: www.albanyshs.wa.edu.au
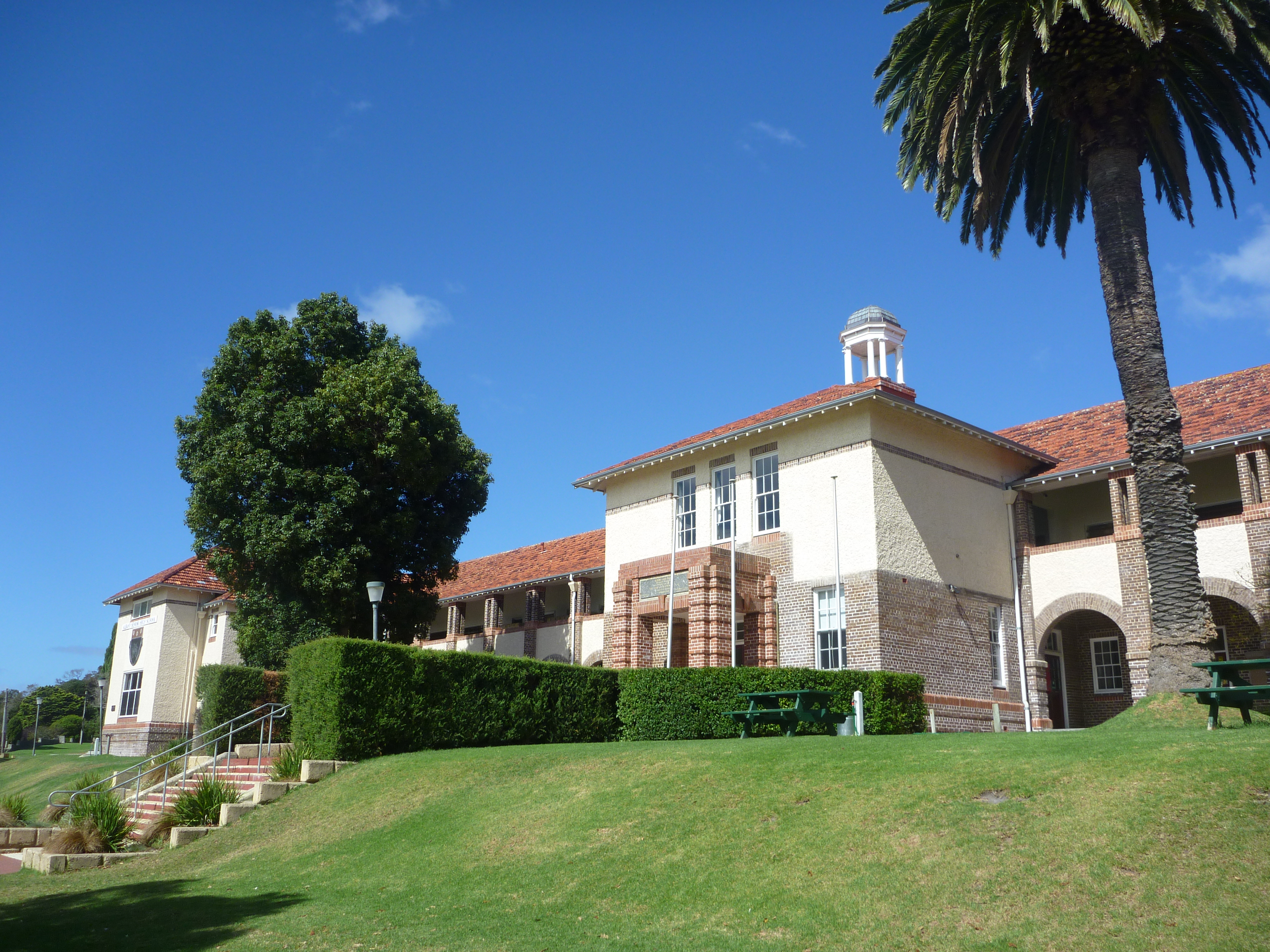
- View of Albany Senior High School main building

Albany Senior High School is a comprehensive public co-educational high school, located in Albany, a regional centre in the Great Southern region, 420 kilometres (261 mi) south-southeast of Perth, Western Australia. The school was established in 1918. The school's catchment area covers most of the City of Albany and in 2015 the school had an enrolment of 1,113 students between Year 7 and Year 12; four percent of whom were Indigenous Australians.

== Catchment area ==
Albany's catchment area has been specified by the Department of Education and Training to include all of the City of Albany other than the western areas serviced by Mount Lockyer and Yakamia primary schools, which are served by North Albany Senior High School.

== History ==
The school opened in 1924. The buildings were designed by the Principal Architect of Western Australia, William Hardwick.

The school had a major upgrade in 1997 in several areas including the science laboratories, Design and Technology area and the home economics area.

Another upgrade occurred in 2002 when the oval, gymnasium and performing arts centre were completed.

Enrolments at the school have been steady over the last few years with 1008 students in 2007, 1055 in 2008, 1078 in 2009, 1005 in 2010, 1012 in 2011, 1011 in 2012, 960 in 2013, 982 in 2014 and 1113 in 2015. The drop in numbers since 2010 is a result of half cohort commencing school in 2010 when the age for Year 8 enrolment was raised by six months across the state. The increase in enrolments in 2015 was due to the loss of the half cohort and the addition of a Year 7 cohort.

The school won the State Country Week Champion School for five consecutive years from 2000 to 2004. The school regained the champion school shield in 2010 but not before Bunbury Senior High School was awarded the champion school at the closing ceremony following a mix-up in the tallying of results. In 2011 the school again won the champion school shield.

Bunbury Senior High School won the shield back from in 2012 with Albany being the runner-up champion school, but the school did win a third consecutive premiership in the football competition. The school were runners up again in 2013 to Bunbury Senior High School and 2014, before winning overall once more in 2015.

In 2013 the school appeared in the top 50 schools for WACE results in position 39. In 2014 it was rated as the top country school, and ranked at 27th in the state.

Long serving principal, Peter Havel, left the school in 2015 and was replaced by Brendan France, who was later replaced by Melissa Walker in 2021 who continues to be the current principal.

== Special programs ==
- Aboriginal School Based Traineeships
- Follow the Dream – Tertiary Aspirations Program
- Online Teaching and Learning System
- VET in Schools Program
- Marine Science
- Education Access/TAFE-Link
- Gifted and Talented Education Program
- Marine and Maritime
- Outdoor Education

Students can be in some or none of these programs when attending ASHS.

== See also ==
- List of schools in rural Western Australia
