= Bunbury Cathedral Grammar School =

Coordinates: 33.405449°S 115.638946°E

- Gelorup, Western Australia

Information
- Type: Co-educational, day & boarding, kindergarten, primary & secondary
- Motto: Fide et opere (By faith and work)
- Denomination: Anglican
- Established: 1972
- Employees: 185
- Key people: Headmaster – Matthew O'Brien; Head of Secondary – Kathy Chiera; Head of Primary – Rob Whirledge; School Chaplain – Geoff Chadwick
- Enrolment: 743 (Day); 68 (Boarding)
- Colours: Blue, gold and white
- Website: http://www.bcgs.wa.edu.au/

Bunbury Cathedral Grammar School (often denoted BCGS), is an independent school in Gelorup, Western Australia, a semi-rural suburb 10 kilometres south of Bunbury. Providing kindergarten, primary and secondary education, the school serves approximately 750 students and employs 190 staff. The school is a global member of the Round Square Organization, and Diocesan School of the Anglican Diocese of Bunbury.

Bunbury Cathedral Grammar School's campus is situated on 33 hectares of bushland, consisting of a primary and secondary school, sporting and boarding facilities.

== History ==
In 1968, a small group of volunteers, led by the bishop of the Anglican Diocese of Bunbury, Bishop Ralph Hawkins, organised the creation of an Anglican, co-educational day and boarding school. Arthur Maynard Jenour, a supporter of a school in Gelorup, sold 72 acres of land to the School Board on a no-interest term. Bunbury Cathedral Grammar School commenced operations in 1972, with an initial enrolment of 78 students.

The school was the first coeducational boarding school in Australia to offer both primary and secondary education.

The school has published a magazine called the Grammarian semi-annually.

Bruce Matthews was the headmaster at the school from 1998 to 2011, when he left to take up a position on the inaugural board of the newly formed School Curriculum and Standards Authority. Matthews' replacement was Michael Giles who joined the school in late 2011 from Great Southern Grammar.

== Academics ==
The school has produced two Rhodes scholars: M. W. Rennie (1983) and Rachel Paterson (2012).

The school has performed well in the WACE exams and has consistently rated in the top 50 schools in the state, the top school in the South West and often is the top regional school in the state.

Year	% +75 in WACE (Note: Based on the number of Stage 3 course enrolments in the school where a WACE course score of 75 or above was achieved)	State ranking (Note: Ranking of school compared to other schools in the state)	% +65 in WACE (Note: Based on the number of Stage 3 course enrolments in the school where a WACE course score of 65 or above was achieved)	State ranking	% graduation (Note: Percentage of Year 12 cohort that graduated with a WACE certificate)
2012	16.59	20	47.56	19	100
2011	12.47	48	47.61	34	100
2010	11.84	39	46.05	39	100
2009		35		45	100

== Notable alumni ==
- Courtney Eaton, actress
- Ben Small, politician
