= Leeuwin (1653) =

Sailing ship built in 1653 and wrecked in 1664

History

Dutch Republic
- Name: Leeuwin (1653)
- Owner: Dutch East India Company; Chamber of Zeeland
- Launched: 1653
- Fate: Wrecked near Macassar on 24 December 1664

General characteristics
- Class & type: East Indiaman
- Tons burthen: 200 bm
- Armament: 26 guns

The Leeuwin was a 400-ton jacht of the Dutch East India Company (Dutch: Vereenigde Oostindische Compagnie, commonly abbreviated to VOC) that travelled to the East Indies twice starting 3 April 1653. It wrecked near Macassar on 24 December 1664.

== History ==
In 1654, Leeuwin was part of a six ship fleet that departed Batavia for the Netherlands. The fleet consisted of Phoenix, Oranje, Salamander, Leeuwin, Koning David and Avondster. The convoy departed the Sunda Strait on 24 January 1654, passed the Cape of Good Hope on 27 March and anchored at St Helena in the South Atlantic Ocean on 18 March. Leeuwin arrived in the Netherlands (probably at Texel) on 30 August 1654. She departed for the return voyage to Batavia on 10 December 1654.

Ongoing conflicts during the Dutch-Portuguese War in 1656 saw Leeuwin called into a blockade of the strategic port of Bantam at the western end of Java during July. In August, the blockading fleet was moved to the west coast of India for another blockade of the Portuguese-held port of Goa. Leeuwin at this time was under the command of Jan Lucasz, and had a crew of 86. She was used to cart stone ballast to other ships in the blockade.

In July 1658 she was used to ferry 500 people, including women and children, from Galle in Ceylon (Sri Lanka) to Batavia. During 1659 Leeuwin was involved in the trade of areca nuts from Galle to the Coromandel Coast and Malacca.
