= Department of Education (Western Australia) =

Western Australian government department

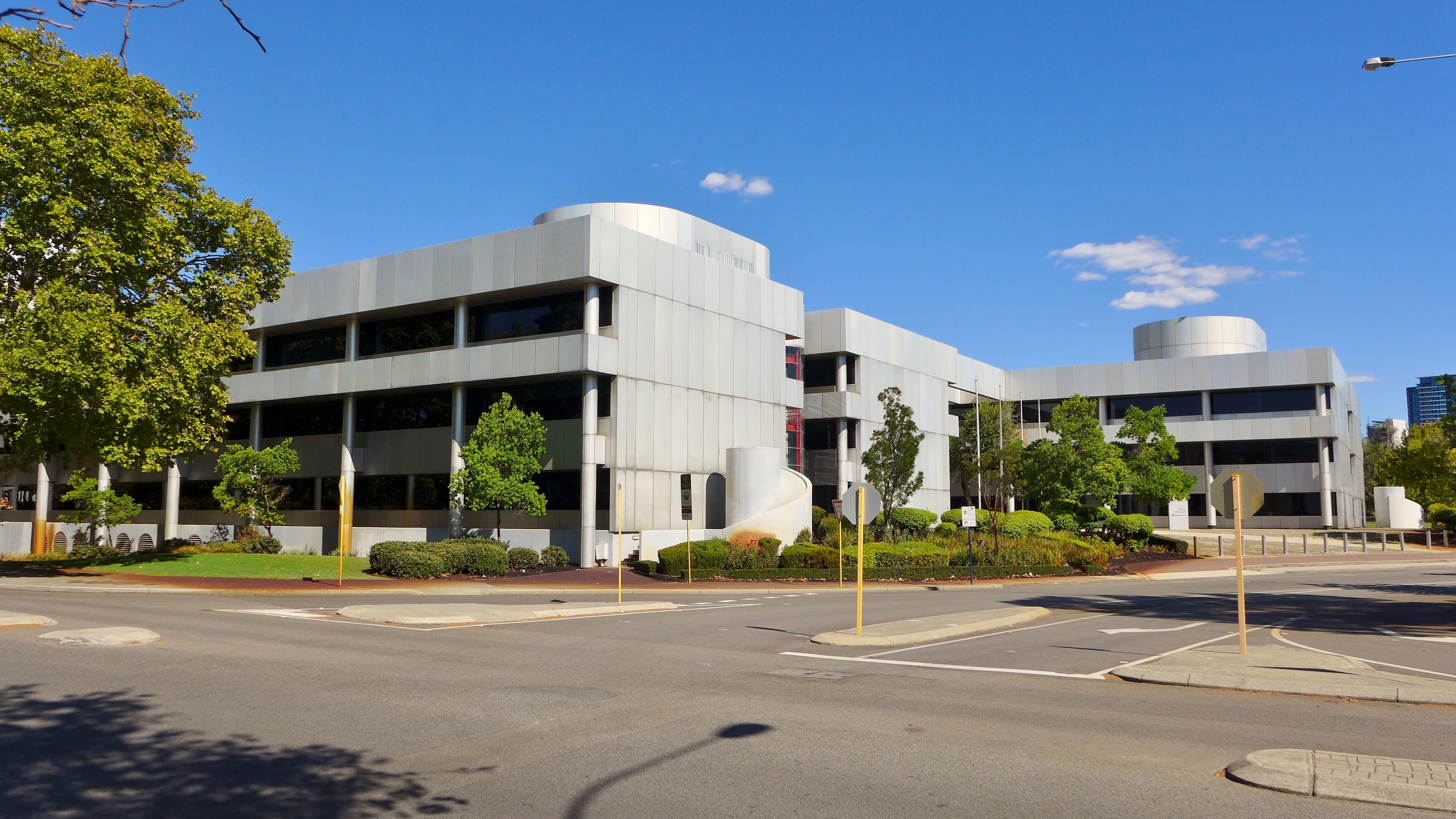
- The Department's headquarters in East Perth

Department overview
- Formed: 1 October 2009; 16 years ago
- Preceding agencies: Department of Education & Training (DET); Education Department of Western Australia; Ministry of Education; Education Department; Central Board of Education; General Board of Education
- Headquarters: 151 Royal Street, East Perth, Western Australia
- Motto: Public education: A world of opportunities
- Employees: 41588
- Minister responsible: Sabine Winton, Minister for Education
- Department executive: Jay Peckitt, Director General
- Child agencies: School Curriculum and Standards Authority; Statewide Services; Leadership Institute; Schools of Special Educational Needs; School of Isolated and Distance Education
- Website: www.education.wa.edu.au

The Department of Education is the state government department responsible for education in Western Australia as well as on Christmas Island and the Cocos (Keeling) Islands. The department's head office, commonly referred to as "Silver City" or "Central Services", is located at 151 Royal Street in East Perth.

The department is led by its director general, Jay Peckitt, who is responsible to the Parliament of Western Australia and the Minister for Education, Sabine Winton.

== Public schools, sub-agencies and branches ==
As of September 2021, the department is responsible for managing 822 public schools in Western Australia. Each public school is located within one of 8 education regions, overseen by an Education Regional Office and Director of Education. The department also oversees the registration, regulation and review of non-government schools in Western Australia.

Additionally, there are a number of sub-agencies and branches of the Department:

Department of Education WA sub-agencies and branches
| Sub-agency or branch name | Responsible for |
|---|---|
| School Curriculum and Standards Authority | Western Australian curriculum development and supporting resources, setting standards of student achievement for Pre Primary to Year 12, setting and marking Year 12 ATAR course examinations, administering standardised testing such as NAPLAN and OLNA (Online Literacy and Numeracy Assessment), awarding and distribution of the WACE to school leavers. |
| Teacher Registration Board of Western Australia | Registration of teachers, managing disciplinary investigations related to maintaining registration and fit and proper status for teachers, accreditation of initial teacher education programs. Relocated to 151 Royal Street, East Perth in 2020. |
| Statewide Services Centre | Consolidated site in Padbury where most of the department's support services for public schools are located. Schools of Special Educational Needs are based here. |
| Non-Government School Registration and Regulation | |
| Leadership Institute | Delivering professional learning for principals, school leaders and line managers. The Institute runs a range of programs for public school leadership teams to support school self-reflection and improvement. |
| Schools of Special Educational Needs (Behaviour, Disability, Sensory, Medical and Mental Health) | |
| Schools of the Air | Delivering correspondence schooling to students in remote locations over Webex and other internet platforms. Previously provided over HF radio frequency. 5 SotA's are Carnarvon, Kalgoorlie, Kimberley, Meekatharra and Port Hedland. |
| School of Isolated and Distance Education | |
| School of Alternative Learning Settings | |

== Preceding agencies ==
- General Board of Education, 31 August 1847 – 17 August 1871
- Central Board of Education, 18 August 1871 – 12 October 1893
- Education Department, 13 October 1893 – 1 July 1988
- Ministry of Education, 1 July 1988 – 1 January 1994
- Education Department of Western Australia, 1 January 1994 – 3 February 2003 (Note: On 3 February 2003, the Department of Education and the Department of Training were merged to form the Department of Education and Training.)
- Department of Education and Training, 3 February 2003 – 30 October 2009 (Note: On 30 October 2009, the Department of Education and Training was demerged to form the Department of Education and the Department of Training and Workforce Development.)

== See also ==
- Education in Australia
- Education in Western Australia
- List of schools in Western Australia
