= Robertson Drive =

Road in Bunbury, Western Australia

Robertson Drive Bunbury Bypass / Bunbury Inner Ring Road Western Australia

General information
- Type: Highway
- Location: Bunbury
- Length: 4.94 km (3.1 mi)
- Route number(s): National Route 1 (Forrest Highway to South Western Highway south); State Route 10 (all sections)

Major junctions
- Northeast end: Forrest Highway (National Route 1), East Bunbury
- South Western Highway (State Route 20); South Western Highway (National Route 1)
- Southwest end: Bussell Highway (State Route 10), Withers

Location(s)
- Major suburbs: Glen Iris, Davenport, Carey Park, College Grove

Highway system
- Highways in Australia; National Highway • Freeways in Australia; Highways in Western Australia

Robertson Drive, also known as the Bunbury Bypass, Bunbury Ring Road, or Bunbury Inner Ring Road, is a 4.9-kilometre-long (3.0 mi) road in Bunbury, Western Australia. It forms a partial ring road around Bunbury, allowing highway traffic to bypass the city centre. The road connects four highway routes that radiate out of Bunbury: Forrest Highway to the north, South Western Highway north-eastbound and south-east bound, and Bussell Highway to the south. A dual carriageway along the route was completed in 1992.

== Route description ==
The northern terminus of the highway is at the Eelup Roundabout, a large, traffic light controlled roundabout that distributes traffic to Koombana Drive, Sandridge Road, Robertson Drive and Forrest Highway. Traffic coming from Forrest Highway has a slip lane that allows free flowing of traffic onto Robertson Drive, whereas the southbound Forrest Highway traffic must proceed through 2 sets of traffic lights. After the roundabout, the road continues south as an 80-kilometre-per-hour (50 mph) zone. There is a traffic light controlled intersection with Picton Road and South Western Highway (northern section, which proceeds as State Route 20), from which the road becomes a 70-kilometre-per-hour (43 mph) zone. The road crosses over the South Western Railway and then descends into the Bunbury Industrial Area, with a major traffic light controlled intersection with South Western Highway (southern section, which proceeds as National Route 1) and Brittain Road. The road continues south, now an 80-kilometre-per-hour (50 mph) zone, followed by a sharp turn towards the west, meeting an intersection with Sommerville Drive. Following the Sommerville intersection, there is access provided to TAFE, the ECU campus and the hospitals. The roads southern terminus is with Bussell Highway at a roundabout with Bussell Highway gaining the State Route 10 marker in the southerly direction.

== Internal designations ==
Robertson Drive is controlled by Main Roads Western Australia, which internally designates it as Highway H57 Forrest Highway (north of South Western Highway), H9 South Western Highway (for the central section), and H43 Bussell Highway (south of South Western Highway).

== Major intersections ==
LGA	Location	km	mi	Destinations	Notes
Bunbury	East Bunbury	0.0	0.0	Forrest Highway east (National Route 1 east) / Sandridge Road west / Koombana Drive north – Bunbury, Mandurah, Perth	Eelup Roundabout (traffic light controlled); northern terminus; National Route 1 northern concurrency terminus; State Route 10 northern terminus
Bunbury	East Bunbury–Glen Iris boundary	1.5	0.93	South Western Highway northeast (State Route 20 northeast) / Picton Road west – Harvey, Collie, Pinjarra	Traffic light intersection.
Bunbury	Davenport	2.4	1.5	South Western Highway southeast (State Route 10 northeast) / Brittain Road west – Donnybrook, Manjimup, Albany	Traffic light intersection. National Route 1 southern concurrency terminus
Bunbury	Carey Park–College Grove boundary	3.8	2.4	Somerville Drive	Traffic light intersection.
Bunbury	Carey Park–Withers–College Grove tripoint	5.1	3.2	Bussell Highway (State Route 10 south) – Capel, Busselton, Margaret River	Southern terminus at roundabout, Robertson west to Bussell south free-flowing. State Route 10 concurrency terminus
1.000 mi = 1.609 km; 1.000 km = 0.621 mi: Concurrency terminus; Route transition; Note: Intersections with minor local roads are not shown

== See also ==
- Wilman Wadandi Highway: also known as the Bunbury Outer Ring Road
