= Electoral district of Capel =

Former electoral district of Western Australia

Capel Western Australia—Legislative Assembly
- State: Western Australia
- Dates current: 2005–2008
- Namesake: Capel
- Area: 3,402 km^{2} (1,313.5 sq mi)

The electoral district of Capel was a Legislative Assembly electorate in the state of Western Australia. The district was named for the South West town of Capel, located between Bunbury and Busselton, which fell within its borders. The seat was abolished after only one term at the 2007 redistribution, taking effect from the 2008 election due to the one vote one value legislation. Most parts of the seat now fall within the new seat of Collie-Preston, which is regarded as a marginal Labor seat by Antony Green based on 2005 figures, with the Busselton portions becoming part of Vasse.

Capel was created out of parts of Collie, Mitchell and Vasse, accounting for significant population growth in the Busselton-Dunsborough area which had seen Vasse contract to those areas. The seat was first contested in the 2005 election at which Liberal member Steve Thomas was successful.

== Geography ==
Capel included some outer southern and southeastern suburbs of Bunbury, as well as most of the inland Shire of Busselton and all of the Shires of Capel and Donnybrook-Balingup. Major centres included the Bunbury suburbs of College Grove, Dalyellup, Davenport, Gelorup, Usher and the southern parts of Withers, and the towns of Balingup, Boyanup, Capel, Carbunup River, Donnybrook, Kirup and Yoongarillup. Of these, only the booths around Withers returned a Labor majority.

== Members for Capel ==
Member	Party	Term
Steve Thomas	Liberal	2005–2008

== See also ==
- Capel, Western Australia
