= Our Lady of Mercy College, Australind =

Our Lady of Mercy College
- Crest of OLMC

Location
- 100 Leisure Drive; Australind, South West region, Western Australia; 6233; Australia; 33°16′10″S 115°44′50″E

Information
- Former name: Bunbury Catholic College Mercy Campus
- Type: Catholic systemic secondary school
- Motto: Embracing Life | Nurturing Faith | Inspiring Learning
- Religious affiliations: Catholic Diocese of Bunbury; Sisters of Mercy
- Denomination: Roman Catholicism
- Established: 2015; 11 years ago (as Bunbury Catholic College Mercy Campus); 2020; 6 years ago (as Our Lady Of Mercy College)
- Chairman: David Beech
- Principal: Vince Bellini
- Employees: ~100
- Years: 7–12
- Enrolment: 990 (2025)
- Houses: Costello; Hayes; McAuley; Read; Frayne; Champagnat
- Colours: Navy blue, sky blue, green
- Publication: Mercy Snapshot; Mercy Stories
- Median ATAR: ▲85.20 (2020)
- Website: Official website

Our Lady of Mercy College (previously known as Bunbury Catholic College Mercy Campus and commonly called OLMC, or simply Mercy) is a Catholic secondary school located in Australind, in the South West region of Western Australia.

The College was originally formed in 2015 when Bunbury Catholic College built it as a second campus. The campus name is derived from the Sisters of Mercy, who co-founded Bunbury Catholic College. The College officially became independent on 1 January 2020.

== History ==
=== Early history and origins ===
The Sisters of Mercy opened St Joseph's School in 1883. The Marist Brothers founded St Francis Xavier's College as a boys' school for the Bunbury region in 1954. By the end of 1972, the enrolment had risen from 84 to 290. In 1955, Sacred Heart High School (opened 1899) merged with St Joseph's.

In 1973 the Bishop of Bunbury, Myles McKeon, ordered the amalgamation of St Francis Xavier College (Marist Brothers) and St Joseph’s School (Mercy Sisters). The amalgamation of the two schools formed Bunbury Catholic College.

=== As a second campus to BCC ===
Our Lady of Mercy College was originally constructed as a second campus for Bunbury Catholic College to “alleviate the enrolment pressures [on BCC] but also [to] open up more enrolment places for students in [the Australind area]”. It was referred to as the Mercy Campus (with the original campus being known as the Marist Campus) and opened in 2015, catering for Years 7 through 9. The first graduating class departed in 2018.

As the Mercy Campus began to become more independent of the original school, the decision was made in 2019 for the two campuses to separate and for Mercy to become a fully independent school.

The name of the new college was put to the community, with the top ten names by popular vote being put to Bishop Gerard Holohan for the final decision. The final name was announced to the college community on 22 May 2019.

On 5 July 2019, Rob Crothers was announced as the new principal of the school as Denise O'Meara retired from the role after 12 years. Crothers had previously been principal of Nagle Catholic College since 2014.

=== As an independent school ===
Signage around the campus was replaced in the week following the conclusion of lower-school classes in December 2019. The College became officially independent on 1 January 2020.

The first classes as an independent school were held on 3 February 2020 for Years 7 and 12, with the first Year 8–11 classes held the following day.

The school directed parents to keep their children at home beginning 27 March due to the ongoing coronavirus pandemic. The College reopened for Year 11 and 12 students on 29 April, and in a limited capacity for students in other years. It resumed full operation on 8 May.

== Campus ==
The OLMC campus is constructed on former farmland close to the suburb of Kingston. At the completion of Stage Two of the construction process, the campus consists of:

- Catherine McAuley building (Stage One): consisting of general purpose classrooms, the CM building also provides the facilities for upper-school exams.
- Ursula Frayne Learning Commons (Stage One): the UF building contains the College administration and library.
- Champagnat Technology Centre (Stage One): formerly referred to as simply the Technology and Enterprise building, the CT centre provides industry-standard facilities for hospitality, trades, and computer-aided design.
- Angela Costello building (Stage Two): the AC centre houses the bulk of student classes and consist entirely of general purpose classrooms.
- Placida Hayes Science Centre (Stage Two): currently the newest building on campus, the PH Centre provides six specialised laboratories for chemistry, biology, and physics.

The College currently expects work on the gymnasium (to be linked with the Read faction) to begin in late May or early June.

Aside from the main buildings, the College also provides an AFL oval, soccer pitch, basketball/netball and volleyball courts. In 2017, the College also acquired the neighbouring block of land, previously Geographe Grammar School (a non-denominational Christian primary school) which had closed at the end of 2015 due to low enrolments. It is referred to as the Mercy Centre (alternatively as Mercy 101 for its street address) and is used primarily for College retreats, and currently as a uniform shop.

=== Architecture ===
The campus was designed through a collaboration with Broderick Architects and CODA Studio.

The Stage One design won the 2015 Think Brick Horbury Hunt Commercial Award and was also awarded a Commendation in Educational Architecture at the 2016 and 2017 WA Architecture Awards.

== College activity ==
=== Academic ===
OLMC offers courses in the general, VET, and ATAR frameworks, allowing students to achieve a WACE. In 2020 the school was ranked 27th in Western Australia with a median ATAR of 85.20, the highest of any regional school.

=== Arts ===
OLMC has notably performed several biannual musical productions in conjunction with BCC. Productions are performed at the Bunbury Regional Entertainment Centre.

Year	Production
2016	The Addams Family
2018	Beauty and the Beast
2021	Matilda

=== Sports ===
OLMC holds an annual cross country event and school sports carnival.

The school is a member of Associated & Catholic Colleges of Western Australia.

==== Pedal Prix ====
As BCC Mercy, OLMC entered several Australian HPV Super Series teams with Bunbury Catholic College the in 2016-2019 City of Busselton 6 Hours events. The teams were composed of students from both the Mercy and Marist campus. The entries were initiated by Mercy students in 2016, and the vehicles were prepared at the OLMC campus prior to each event.

(Western Australia) City of Busselton 6 Hours results
Year	Team	Vehicle	No.	Class	Laps	Pos.	Class Pos.	Cite
2016	(Western Australia) Bunbury Catholic College	Bunbury Catholic College	335	2	104	27th	6th	
2017	(Western Australia) Bunbury Catholic College	BCC	306	2	162	20th	6th	
2018	(Western Australia) Bunbury Catholic College	Bunbury CC1	354	S2	173	16th	5th	
2018	(Western Australia) Bunbury Catholic College	Bunbury CC2	353	S3	94	48th	7th	
2018	(Western Australia) Bunbury CC	BCC 3	12	S2	87	49th	21st	
2019	(Western Australia) Bunbury Catholic College	BCC1	346	S2	92	47th	23rd	
2019	(Western Australia) Bunbury Catholic College	BCC2	347	S2	64	48th	24th	

=== Extracurricular activities ===
The College participates in the annual Western Australian Debating League regional competition, and were 2016 Junior Champions and 2018 and 2019 Junior Runner-ups.

OLMC is the equal most-successful school in the South West Philosothon, with three consecutive team wins.

== Publications ==
=== Current ===
==== Mercy Snapshot ====
The Mercy Snapshot fills the role of the former newsletter, containing announcements regarding the College. Issue 1 was published on 13 May 2020.

==== Mercy Stories ====
Mercy Stories is the College's news facility and published its first story on 5 May 2020. Mercy Stories focuses on college life and events, describing itself as a "students' voice".

=== Former ===
==== Newsletter ====
The College newsletter was a fortnightly publication containing notable news and announcements regarding the school. It was replaced by the Mercy Snapshot and the Mercy Stories service on 13 May 2020, after only four editions. The final newsletter was published on 3 April 2020.

==== The Daily Bulletin ====
The College produced The Daily Bulletin, a daily notice paper which contained announcements regarding College activities, student groups and services, and notices from staff. It ran from the school's inception in 2015 as a BCC campus until 20 February 2020. From 2015 to 2019 the Bulletin was produced in collaboration with BCC and contained both campuses' notices, until it was split in 2020 to two different publications. Publication of the OLMC Bulletin ran for only 18 days with 14 editions.

== Houses ==
Houses at OLMC are linked to specific buildings, which share the house’s colour.

OLMC factions
House	Dedicated to	Colour	Formerly*
Costelllo	Sr Mary Angela (b. Ellen Costello)	Teal	Marcellin (gold)
Hayes	Sr Mary Placida (b. Elizabeth Hayes)	Purple	Valentine (blue)
McAuley	Catherine McAuley	Red	McAuley (green)
Read	Sr Mary Xavier (b. Mary Josephine Read)	Yellow	Xavier (red)

* Students who commenced in 2019 or earlier were assigned to Bunbury Catholic College houses, and were transitioned to OLMC houses in 2020.

== Principals ==
OLMC principals
Principal		Vice Principal		Notes
Years served	Principal	Years served	Vice Principal	Notes
2015–2019	Ms Denise O’Meara	2015–2019	Mr Eugene de Lima	As BCC principal and vice principal.
2020–2024	Mr Rob Crothers	2020-2024		
2025–Present	Mr Vince Bellini		Mrs Maree Maughan	

== College identity ==
=== Name ===
The name of the college was open to suggestions from the community. Parents, students, and staff were then encouraged to vote on the potential names with the 10 most popular put to Bishop Gerard Holohan for the final decision, which was announced on 22 May 2019.

The college's name is commonly abbreviated to OLMC (and in some cases as OLMCA to distinguish from schools with a similar name) and is often referred to as simply Mercy, a widespread habit originally derived from the former name, Mercy Campus. The name recognises the campus's history and pays tribute to the role that the Sisters of Mercy played in its formation.

=== Crest ===
The OLMC crest.

Six potential crest designs were proposed, and the College community was encouraged to vote. A second round of voting followed, with a vote being held between the two most popular designs, with the winner being used as the College crest.

The crest contains the Mercy Cross (in recognition of the Sisters of Mercy and their values, as well as the College's Catholic faith). It is contained within "a modern shield to represent our contemporary education", with the three strands representing "each student's [unique journey and] path to success".

=== Motto ===
The College’s motto was decided upon by the inaugural principal, Rob Crothers. It is intended to outline the values of the College.

=== Colours ===
The College colours were chosen by the Parents & Friends association and staff.

Navy "is the colour of the largest [strand] and the Mercy cross" representing the centrality of the College's faith and the unity it inspires. Light blue "symbolises understanding and compassion", and green represents "nature and growth" while linking the College to the local landscape.

== See also ==
- Bunbury Catholic College, the original parent school of OLMC
- List of schools in rural Western Australia
- Catholic education in Australia
