= Myles McKeon =

- Bishop of Bunbury
- Church: Catholic Church
- Diocese: Diocese of Bunbury
- In office: 6 March 1969 – 18 February 1982
- Predecessor: Launcelot Goody
- Successor: Peter Quinn
- Previous posts: Titular Bishop of Antipyrgos (1962-1969); Auxiliary Bishop of Perth (1962-1969)

Orders
- Ordination: 22 June 1947 by Henry Marshall
- Consecration: 12 September 1962 by Launcelot Goody

Personal details
- Born: 3 April 1919 Drummin, County Mayo, United Kingdom of Great Britain and Ireland
- Died: 2 May 2016 (aged 97) Subiaco, Perth, Western Australia, Australia

Myles McKeon (3 April 1919 – 2 May 2016) was an Irish-born Australian bishop who was the Roman Catholic Bishop of Bunbury.

== Early life ==
McKeon was born in Drummin, County Mayo, Ireland to John and Bridget McKeon. He was educated at St Jarlath's College, Tuam. He attended University College Dublin and studied for the priesthood All Hallows College, Dublin.

== Priesthood ==
McKeon was ordained a priest for the Archdiocese of Perth on 22 June 1947 at All Hallows College, Dublin, by Bishop Henry Vincent Marshall of Salford. He arrived in Fremantle from London on 21 February 1948.

He spent his first four years as assistant priest in Maylands before being appointed to St Mary's Cathedral, Perth as an assistant priest. He then began working in the mission and migration fields. In February 1954, he was appointed Director of Pontifical Mission Aid Societies. In April 1960, he was made a Privy Chamberlain and given the title of Monsignor.

== Episcopate ==
On 23 May 1962 he was appointed an Auxiliary Bishop of Perth and Titular Bishop of Antipyrgos. He was consecrated as a bishop by Bishop Launcelot Goody at St Mary's Cathedral, Perth on 12 September 1962.

On 6 March 1969, he was appointed Bishop of Bunbury.

As bishop, he established the Busselton Catholic Youth Camp, brought the Carmelite Sisters from the Carmelite Sisters to establish a monastery at Gelorup, invited the Salvatorians to establish a presence in Esperance, amalgamated Mercy College for Girls and Marist College for boys into Bunbury Catholic College, established the Diocesan Development fund, established a permanent diaconate in the Diocese and established Centrecare in the Diocese. He also introduced a number of other orders into the diocese, including the Franciscan Missionaries of Mary, the Brothers of St Gerard Majella, and the Blessed Sacrament Fathers.

== Retirement and death ==
He resigned as Bishop of Bunbury on 18 February 1982, owing to ill-health, largely due to a spinal condition. He continued to work in the Diocese as Director of the Propagation of the Faith after his retirement.

He spent his final years being cared for by the Sisters of St John of God in Subiaco.

He died on 2 May 2016, at the age of 97, more than three decades after retiring as Bishop of Bunbury. His funeral was held at St Patrick's Cathedral, Bunbury, where his body is buried in the crypt.

Catholic Church titles
Preceded by Lancelot Goody	Bishop of Bunbury; 1969 - 1982	Succeeded by Peter Quinn
