= Peter Quinn (bishop) =

Western Australian Catholic bishop

- Bishop of Bunbury
- Church: Catholic Church
- Diocese: Diocese of Bunbury
- In office: 26 May 1982 – 20 December 2000
- Predecessor: Myles McKeon
- Successor: Gerard Holohan
- Previous posts: Titular Bishop of Falerone (1969-1982); Auxiliary Bishop of Perth (1969-1982)

Orders
- Ordination: 21 December 1950 by Pietro Fumasoni Biondi
- Consecration: 27 August 1969 by Launcelot Goody

Personal details
- Born: 17 February 1928 Subiaco, Perth, Western Australia, Australia
- Died: 23 October 2008 (aged 80)

Peter Quinn (17 February 1928 – 23 August 2008) was a Catholic bishop, who served as an auxiliary bishop of the Archdiocese of Perth from 1969 to 1982, then bishop of the Roman Catholic Diocese of Bunbury from 1982 until 2000.

== Early life ==
Quinn was born on 17 February 1928 in Subiaco, the fourth son of seven children born to Jeremiah and Aileen Sarah Quinn.

Jeremiah was born in Cork, Ireland. He Aileen met in the Goldfields in Western Australia and they were married in 1909 in Boulder. They returned to Ireland for a year before returning to settle in Western Australia.

Quinn grew up in Highgate and received his primary education from the Sisters of Our Lady of the Mission in Highgate before moving to Christian Brothers' High School, Highgate. In 1942, at the age of 14, he became one of the first 20 students to join the newly founded St Charles' Seminary, Guildford, where he completed his secondary education. Eight of the original 20 would go on to be priests. In 1947, he was sent to complete his studies at the Pontificio Collegio Urbano de Propaganda Fide in Rome. In 1949, his father passed away while he was studying in Rome.

== Priesthood ==
Quinn was ordained a priest for the Archdiocese of Perth on 21 December 1950 by Cardinal Pietro Fumasoni Biondi in the chapel of the Pontificio Collegio Urbano de Propaganda Fide. He became the sixth student from St Charles' Seminary, Guildford to be ordained to the priesthood. He was one of six Australians ordained during the ceremony. He celebrated his first Mass in the Clementine chapel in the crypt of St. Peter's Basilica.

Following his ordination, he remained in Rome to complete his post-graduate studies and obtained a Doctor of Canon Law in 1954 from the Pontifical Lateran University. He then travelled to the United States where he spent six months working on the Boston Matrimonial Tribunal to gain experience. He returned to Perth on 25 March 1955. He received his first appointment, as assistant priest at Highgate. In Highgate, he occasionally preached in Italian to cater to the growing Italian population in the suburb due to post-war migration.

In 1959, he became secretary to Archbishop Redmond Prendiville. In 1965, he became parish priest of the new Mirrabooka parish. He was also vice-officialis of the Provincial and Diocesan Tribunal. In 1969, he was appointed Vicar General of the Archdiocese of Perth Administrator of St Mary's Cathedral, Perth and was also given the title of Monsignor.

== Episcopate ==
On 26 June 1969, Quinn was appointed Auxiliary Bishop of Perth and Titular Bishop of Falerone. Following his appointment, he was appointed parish priest of Nedlands and continued to serve as Vicar General. He also became Episcopal Vicar for Religious.

He was consecrated a bishop on 27 August 1969 at St Mary's Cathedral, Perth by Archbishop Launcelot Goody. He would later serve as a member of the Catholic Education Commission and the ecumenical committee. At the Australian Episcopal Conference, he served on the committees for mass media, clergy and religious, and laity. He was also episcopal deputy for the Young Christian Students movement.

On 26 May 1982, he was appointed Bishop of Bunbury by Pope John Paul II, following the premature retirement of Bishop Myles McKeon.

He was installed as Bishop of Bunbury on 4 August 1982 at St Patrick's Cathedral, Bunbury.

== Retirement and death ==
Quinn retired from episcopal ministry on 20 December 2000, a few years short of the mandatory retirement age of 75, due to health reasons. He remained on as Apostolic Administrator until Bishop Gerard Joseph Holohan was appointed on 11 June 2001.

He returned to Perth and served the people of the Archdiocese in retirement.

In early 2008, he was diagnosed with cancer and died on 23 August 2008 at his home in Bedford. His funeral was held at Bunbury Catholic College on 3 September 2008 and he was buried in the Bunbury Cemetery. On 29 August 2011, his body was exhumed and interred into the crypt of the newly renovated St Patrick's Cathedral, Bunbury.

== Notes ==
Catholic Church titles
Preceded by Myles McKeon	Bishop of Bunbury; 1982 - 2000	Succeeded by Gerard Holohan
