= 2011 Western Bulldogs season =

Western Bulldogs
2011 season
- President: David Smorgon
- Coach: Rodney Eade
- Captain: Matthew Boyd
- Home ground: Docklands Stadium
- Pre-season competition: First round
- AFL season: 10th
- Leading goalkicker: Barry Hall (55)

The 2011 Western Bulldogs season was the club's 86th since their introduction to the VFL/AFL in 1925. Matthew Boyd was confirmed to be the captain for the season, and Rodney Eade remained as coach.

== 2011 Results ==
=== Pre-season ===
==== NAB Cup ====
| Round | Opposition | Time | Date | Home/Away | Venue | Score | Result/Margin | Broadcaster | TV |
|---|---|---|---|---|---|---|---|---|---|
| 1 | North Melbourne | 4:50 pm | Sunday 20 February | Away | Skilled Stadium | 1.2.2 (23) - 0.8.6 (54) | WON by 31 points | | |
| 1 | Geelong | 5:55 pm | Sunday 20 February | Away | Skilled Stadium | 0.7.4 (46) - 0.4.1 (21) | Lost by 25 points | | |

==== NAB Challenge ====
| Round | Opposition | Time | Date | Home/Away | Venue | Score | Result/Margin |
|---|---|---|---|---|---|---|---|
| 1 | Brisbane Lions | 1:10 pm | Saturday 26 February | Visy Park | Home | 20.8 (128) - 8.10 (58) | WON by 70 points |
| 2 | Fremantle | 7:10 pm | Saturday 5 March | Hands Oval | Away | 9.14 (68) - 14.14 (98) | WON by 30 points |
| 3 | North Melbourne | 1:00 pm | Saturday 12 March | Eureka Stadium | Away | 18.10 (118) - 16.9 (105) | Lost by 13 points |

=== Home and Away season ===
| Round | Opposition | Time | Date | Home/Away | Venue | Score | Result/Margin | Broadcaster | TV | Ladder Position |
|---|---|---|---|---|---|---|---|---|---|---|
| 1 | Essendon | 1:10 pm | Saturday 27 March | Away | Etihad Stadium | 16.17 (113) - 8.10 (58) | Lost by 55 points | Fox Sports 1 | Live | 16th |
| 2 | Brisbane Lions | 1:10 pm | Sunday 3 April | Home | Etihad Stadium | 19.9 (123) - 6.9 (45) | WON by 78 points | Fox Sports 1 | Live | 8th |
| 3 | Gold Coast | 2:10 pm | Saturday 9 April | Home | Etihad Stadium | 18.14 (122) - 7.9 (51) | WON by 71 points | Ten Network | Delayed | 5th |
| 4 | BYE | | | | | | | | | 9th |
| 5 | Fremantle | 6:40 pm | Monday 25 April | Away | Subiaco Oval | 12.13 (85) - 11.12 (78) | Lost by 7 points | Fox Sports 1 | Live | 9th |
| 6 | Collingwood | 4:40 pm | Sunday 1 May | Away | MCG | 15.15 (105) - 8.9 (57) | Lost by 48 points | Fox Sports 1 | Live | 11th |
| 7 | Sydney | 1:10 pm | Saturday 7 May | Home | Manuka Oval | 10.5 (65) - 10.13 (73) | Lost by 8 points | Fox Sports 1 | Live | 12th |
| 8 | Richmond | 2:10 pm | Sunday 15 May | Home | Etihad Stadium | 23.15 (153) - 18.10 (118) | WON by 35 points | Seven Network | Delayed | 11th |
| 9 | West Coast | 2:40 pm | Sunday 22 May | Away | Subiaco Oval | 26.19 (175) - 8.4 (52) | Lost by 123 points | Fox Sports 1 | Live | 11th |
| 10 | Hawthorn | 4:40 pm | Sunday 29 May | Home | Etihad Stadium | 9.8 (62) - 13.13 (91) | Lost by 29 points | Fox Sports 1 | Live | 12th |
| 11 | Geelong Cats | 2:10 pm | Saturday 4 June | Away | Skilled Stadium | 23.10 (148) - 13.9 (87) | Lost by 61 points | Ten Network | Delayed | 13th |
| 12 | St Kilda | 1:10 pm | Friday 10 June | Away | Etihad Stadium | 12.9 (81) - 8.9 (57) | Lost by 24 points | Seven Network | Delayed | 13th |
| 13 | Adelaide | 7:40 pm | Friday 17 June | Home | Etihad Stadium | 14.16 (100) - 10.10 (70) | WON by 30 points | Seven Network | Delayed | 13th |
| 14 | Gold Coast | 2:10 pm | Saturday 25 June | Away | Carrara Stadium | 13.10 (88) - 17.8 (110) | WON by 22 points | Ten Network | Delayed | 13th |
| 15 | Melbourne | 7:40 pm | Friday 1 July | Home | Etihad Stadium | 19.13 (127) - 8.15 (63) | WON by 64 points | Seven Network | Delayed | 12th |
| 16 | Carlton | 4:40 pm | Sunday 10 July | Home | Etihad Stadium | 14.12 (96) - 9.15 (69) | WON by 27 points | Fox Sports 1 | Live | 9th |
| 17 | North Melbourne | 4:40 pm | Sunday 17 July | Away | Etihad Stadium | 21.16 (142) - 17.9 (111) | Lost by 31 points | Fox Sports 1 | Live | 12th |
| 18 | Sydney | 7:10 pm | Saturday 23 July | Away | SCG | 16.18 (114) - 11.9 (75) | Lost by 39 points | Fox Sports 1 | Live | 12th |
| 19 | West Coast | 2:10 pm | Saturday 30 July | Home | Etihad Stadium | 15.5 (95) - 15.13 (103) | Lost by 8 points | Ten Network | Delayed | 12th |
| 20 | BYE | | 12th | | | | | | | |
| 21 | Essendon | 7:10 pm | Saturday 13 August | Home | Etihad Stadium | 15.11 (101) - 23.12 (150) | Lost by 49 points | Ten Network | Delayed | 12th |
| 22 | Port Adelaide | 3:10 pm | Sunday 21 August | Away | AAMI Stadium | 15.7 (97) - 24.13 (157) | WON by 60 points | Seven Network | Live | 11th |
| 23 | Hawthorn | 2:10 pm | Saturday 27 August | Away | MCG | 16.17 (113) - 10.7 (67) | Lost by 46 points | Ten Network | Delayed | 13th |
| 24 | Fremantle | 2:10 pm | Saturday 3 September | Home | Etihad Stadium | 15.17 (107) 8.13 (61) | Won by 46 points | Ten Network | Delayed | 10th |

== Ladder ==
2011 AFL ladder
| Pos | Team | Pld | W | L | D | PF | PA | PP | Pts | |
|---|---|---|---|---|---|---|---|---|---|---|
| 1 | Collingwood | 22 | 20 | 2 | 0 | 2592 | 1546 | 167.7 | 80 | Finals series |
| 2 | Geelong (P) | 22 | 19 | 3 | 0 | 2548 | 1619 | 157.4 | 76 | Finals series |
| 3 | Hawthorn | 22 | 18 | 4 | 0 | 2355 | 1634 | 144.1 | 72 | Finals series |
| 4 | West Coast | 22 | 17 | 5 | 0 | 2235 | 1715 | 130.3 | 68 | Finals series |
| 5 | Carlton | 22 | 14 | 7 | 1 | 2225 | 1700 | 130.9 | 58 | Finals series |
| 6 | St Kilda | 22 | 12 | 9 | 1 | 1891 | 1677 | 112.8 | 50 | Finals series |
| 7 | Sydney | 22 | 12 | 9 | 1 | 1897 | 1735 | 109.3 | 50 | Finals series |
| 8 | Essendon | 22 | 11 | 10 | 1 | 2217 | 2217 | 100.0 | 46 | Finals series |
| 9 | North Melbourne | 22 | 10 | 12 | 0 | 2106 | 2082 | 101.2 | 40 | |
| 10 | Western Bulldogs | 22 | 9 | 13 | 0 | 2060 | 2155 | 95.6 | 36 | |
| 11 | Fremantle | 22 | 9 | 13 | 0 | 1791 | 2155 | 83.1 | 36 | |
| 12 | Richmond | 22 | 8 | 13 | 1 | 2069 | 2396 | 86.4 | 34 | |
| 13 | Melbourne | 22 | 8 | 13 | 1 | 1974 | 2315 | 85.3 | 34 | |
| 14 | Adelaide | 22 | 7 | 15 | 0 | 1742 | 2193 | 79.4 | 28 | |
| 15 | Brisbane Lions | 22 | 4 | 18 | 0 | 1814 | 2240 | 81.0 | 16 | |
| 16 | Port Adelaide | 22 | 3 | 19 | 0 | 1718 | 2663 | 64.5 | 12 | |
| 17 | Gold Coast | 22 | 3 | 19 | 0 | 1534 | 2726 | 56.3 | 12 | |

Source: AFL ladder
Rules for classification: 1) points; 2) percentage; 3) number of points for.
(P) Premiers

== See also ==
- 2011 AFL season
- Western Bulldogs season 2010
