= Rose Hotel, Bunbury =

Historic hotel in Bunbury, Western Australia

Rose Hotel
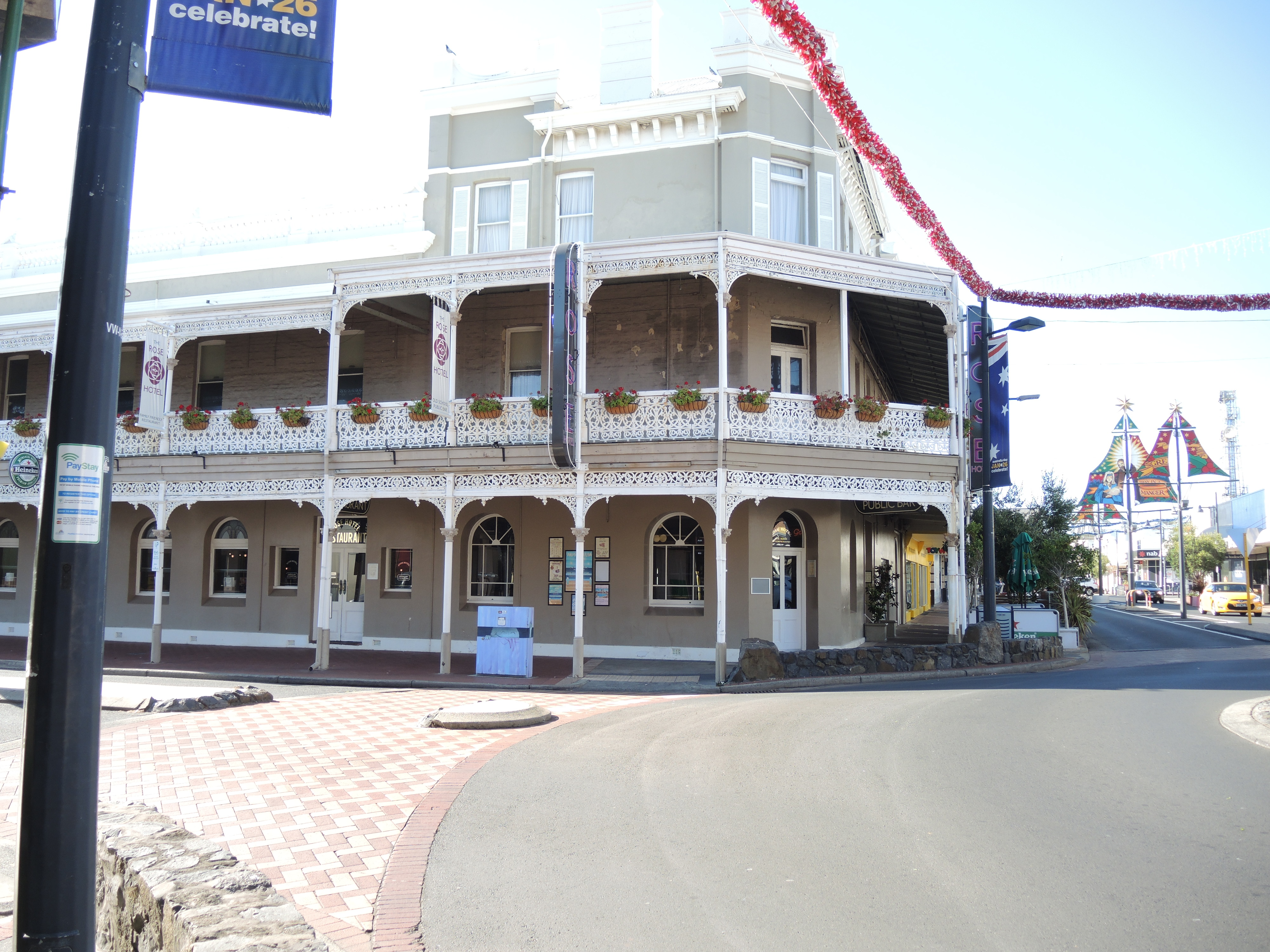
- The Rose Hotel in 2019
- Interactive map of the Rose Hotel area

General information
- Type: Australian pub
- Location: Bunbury, Western Australia
- Coordinates: 33.32455°S 115.6373°E

Western Australia Heritage Register
- Designated: 23 May 1997
- Reference no.: 376

The Rose Hotel is a historic hotel in Bunbury, Western Australia. Both the hotel itself and the adjacent bottle shop are heritage listed buildings. It is located at the corner of Wellington Street and Victoria Street, in Bunbury's central business district.

== History ==
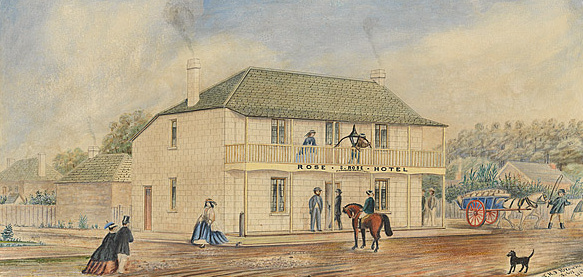
1868 watercolour Rose Hotel, Bunbury by Thomas Browne

Bunbury's first hotel licences were granted in the 1840s, and by 1865 two hotels were operating, and a licence had been granted for a third. In 1865 Samuel Rose, a migrant and agricultural labourer, applied for licence. It was initially refused as the existing hotels were considered sufficient for Bunbury. A petition in support of the proposed hotel, signed by the town's residents, was presented to the Governor John Hampton; he directed the licensing bench to reconsider the application, and a licence was then issued that year.

Initially a single-story Rose Hotel was built on Victoria Street; Rose soon built a two-storey structure near the corner with Wellington Street, with a bar and dining room downstairs and four bedrooms upstairs. Rose died in 1867; his wife Emma Delaporte took over, and later her son Richard Delaporte. Following the Delaportes, until the 1890s, were several licensees – Thomas Spencer, P McArthur, Alex Forbes, Askin Edward Bonney, Bonney's wife Fanny Maria Bonney nee Mann (widowed on the day Bonney took over), and John Henry Darley. Darley took over in September 1890 after he married Fanny Bonney, and a short while after this it became J C Illingworth's.

The hotel was expanded with a billiard room c. 1888, and a new two-storey wing along Wellington Street opened in 1898. This added new bedrooms, a saloon bar, dining room, and spacious entrance hall to the hotel. The rear of the new and original buildings were joined, becoming a shared space. A stable was constructed from stone on Wellington Street, for guests' horses. The upgrade cost £7,000, and by 1901 the hotel was considered a landmark, with a standard as high as the top city hotels.

The original section was demolished c. 1904, and in its place a three-storey building was constructed along Victoria Street. The new building was connected to the existing two-storey building facing Victoria Street. At the same time, a sample room was built where the stable had been. Salesmen travelling by whichever means – train, foot, ship, or horse and buggy – would use the hotel as accommodation, and could use the sample room to exhibit and sell their goods. Sample rooms' usage diminished following World War Two, as cars became more common and roads were improved.

The Rose Hotel was used for official functions, including Armistice Day celebrations on 11 November 1918 featuring the Bunbury Municipal Band playing to a crowd of approximately 1000 people.

The hotel changed hands a few more times over the next few decades – Mrs Illingworth's sister, Mrs Nenke, became the licensee around 1920, and later John Hithersay, followed by E J Saunders in 1932. J J Monaghan, a lawyer and owner of the Prince of Wales Hotel, bought the Rose Hotel in 1939, and spent £5,000 on renovations. Following Monaghan' death, his wife ran the hotel, and by 1961 the proprietors were Col and Meg Sangster. The Sangsters redeveloped the hotel, and opened a bottle shop, described as an "ultramodern bottle department", in the former sample room in the 1960s.

In 1969 John and Elizabeth Drinkwater bought the hotel. The Drinkwaters remained the owners until 2018, when they sold to the owners to the owners of Kalgoorlie's Exchange Hotel, Dave Allan and Lawson Douglas.

The hotel and former sample room were given entries on the Register of the National Estate on 1 November 1983, and the City of Bunbury's Municipal Inventory on 31 July 1996. They were listed on the State Register of Heritage Places on 23 May 1997, and on the city's heritage list on 15 April 2003.

In 2016 the hotel was renovated, with the aid of a $5,850 grant from the state government. The original timber was uncovered in door frames and floorboards, and a 4-metre (13 ft) archways and historic brickwork discovered during the work was incorporated into the new design. Substantial improvements were completed to the ballroom, dining room, bars and kitchen in 2019, with the new owners Allan and Douglas planning further renovations for the outdoor spaces: a new alfresco area, and an upgraded beer garden.
