= Diocese of Bunbury =

Diocese of Bunbury could refer to:

- Anglican Diocese of Bunbury
- Roman Catholic Diocese of Bunbury
