= Electoral results for the district of Capel =

Western Australian district election results

This is a list of electoral results for the Electoral district of Capel in Western Australian state elections.

== Members for Capel ==
Member	Party	Term
Steve Thomas	Liberal	2005–2008

== Election results ==
=== Elections in the 2000s ===
2005 Western Australian state election: Capel
Party	Candidate	Votes	%	±%
Liberal	Steve Thomas	5,791	44.2	+11.7
Labor	John Mondy	3,784	28.9	+2.9
National	Murray Scott	1,190	9.1	−5.1
Greens	Richard Chapman	1,069	8.2	−0.3
Family First	Marilyn Shraga	736	5.6	+5.6
One Nation	Carol Johnson	370	2.8	−11.5
Christian Democrats	Trista Palmer	166	1.3	+1.3
Total formal votes		13,106	94.5	−1.5
Informal votes		758	5.5	+1.5
Turnout		13,864	89.0	
Two-party-preferred result
Liberal	Steve Thomas	7,757	59.2	+2.7
Labor	John Mondy	5,335	40.8	−2.7
Liberal hold		Swing	+2.7	
