= South Bunbury Football Club =

Names
- Full name: South Bunbury Football Club
- Nickname: Tigers
- Motto: Cede Nullis

2025 season
- After finals: 1st
- Home-and-away season: 2nd

Club details
- Founded: 1897
- Colours: Red and white
- Competition: South West Football League
- Chairperson: John Castrilli
- Coach: Julian Burgess
- Captain: Kevin Chitty
- Premierships: 46 (17 in SWFL - most recent: 2025)
- Ground: Hands Oval

Other information
- Official website: http://www.sbfc.com.au/

South Bunbury Football Club is a semi-professional Australian rules football club based in South Bunbury, Western Australia. The club plays in the South West Football League. Since being founded in 1897 the club has won 46 premierships and has been a runner-up 24 times. Since joining the SWFL in 1957 the club has won 17 premierships.

The club sits second nationally in terms of senior premierships won. North (King Island) have won 47 while South Bunbury are second with 46. It is likely that one of these two clubs will be the first club in Australia to win 50 senior premierships.

== History ==
The South Bunbury club was founded in May 1897 at a meeting at the Prince of Wales Hotel in Bunbury.

South Bunbury picked up the nickname Tigers after the relative inaccessibility and perceived wildness of the South Bunbury area around the turn of the 20th century.

== Club records ==
- Total League premierships: 46* (1898, 1904, 1905, 1906, 1907, 1908, 1912, 1913, 1914, 1918, 1919, 1920, 1921, 1922, 1926, 1929, 1931, 1933, 1934, 1935, 1936, 1937, 1948, 1949, 1951, 1952, 1953, 1954, 1955, 1957, 1959, 1966, 1968, 1971, 1976, 1980, 1981, 1984, 1985, 1988, 1989, 1993, 2002, 2016, 2024, 2025). ***NOTE: The club claims a premiership in 1899, but the Bunbury Herald of June 15, 1899 (p3) reports that due to a lack of interest, the South-West District Football Association was disbanded.
- Reserves premierships: 29 (1921, 1922, 1923, 1931, 1933, 1937, 1947, 1950, 1951, 1952, 1953, 1954, 1955, 1956, 1957, 1958, 1959, 1960, 1962, 1965, 1971, 1974, 1984, 1986, 1991, 1993, 2007, 2017, 2022, 2024)
- Colts premierships: 7 (1962, 1964, 1983, 1984, 1986, 1990, 2005)
- Women's premierships: 3 (2019,2020,2021)
- Most career games: 277, Ian Cahill
- Most goals in a game: 14, Adam Matson, 2000
- Most goals in a season: 100 Leigh Kohlmann 2023, 87 Don Aldersea, 1967

== Notable players ==
- Syd Jackson
- Adam Hunter
- Alan Cransberg
- Trevor Nisbett
- Phillip Matson
- Leon Baker
- Michael Warren
- David Hollins
- Darren Kowal
- Katie-Jayne Grieve
