= Prince of Wales Hotel, Bunbury =

Coordinates: 33.3264°S 115.6384°E

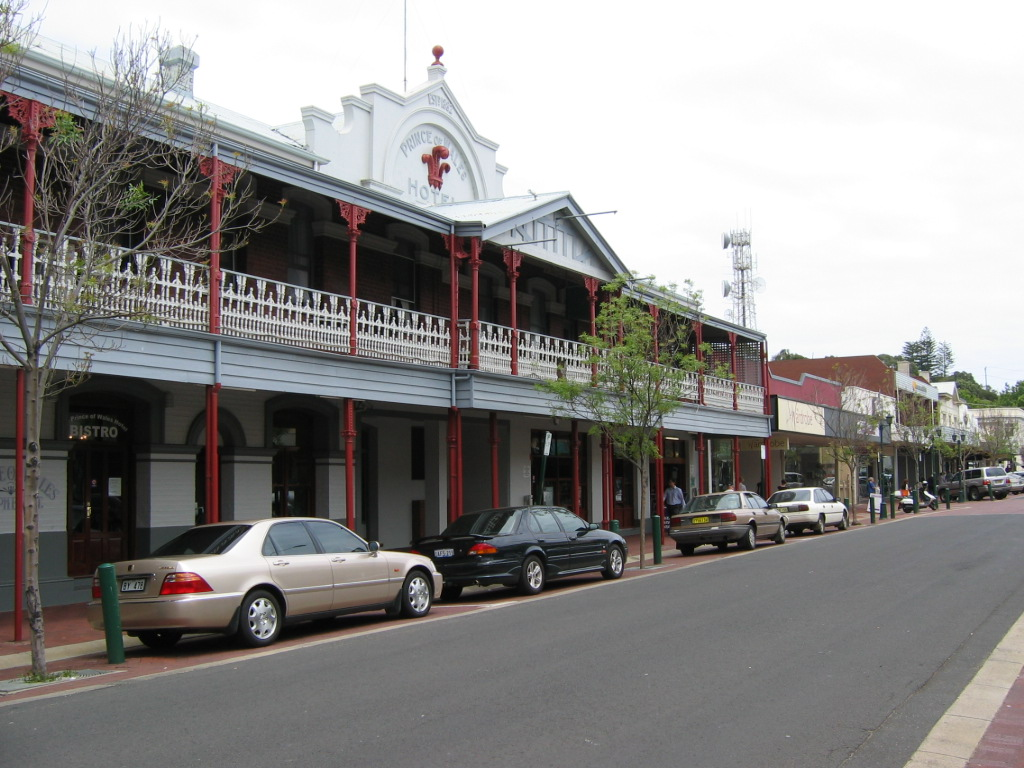
The Prince of Wales Hotel in 2006

The Prince of Wales Hotel is a heritage-listed hotel in Bunbury, Western Australia. Located at 41 Stephen Street in Bunbury's central business district, it originally opened in a house in 1882. A second building was added in 1892, and extensive renovations in 1906 joined the two structures.

In modern times it has become a popular live music venue, and a heritage restoration was completed in 2014.
