= Bunbury Regional Prison =

Prison in Western Australia

- Interactive map of Bunbury Regional Prison
- Location: Davenport, Western Australia; 33°23′01″S 115°40′15″E
- Status: Operational
- Security class: Maximum (remand only), medium, minimum (Male only)
- Capacity: 572
- Opened: 5 February 1971
- Managed by: Department of Justice, Western Australia

Bunbury Regional Prison is a multi-security prison located in College Grove, a southern suburb of Bunbury, Western Australia. It opened in February 1971, and the minimum-security block was commissioned in 1982. Self-care units were added in 1992 that allowed some prisoners to do their own cooking and cleaning.

Offenders are expected to work or study, and can access the prison's education and employment facilities. In the education centre, prisoners can study subjects from basic adult literacy and numeracy to a wide range of TAFE subjects and courses. A feature of the prison is a market garden which supplies a large proportion of fresh vegetables consumed in the State's prisons. It is the major employer of minimum-security prisoners and off-sets the cost of managing prisons in the State.

The prison found itself in the news in 2005, when two minimum-security inmates escaped. Additionally sex offender Paul Stephen Keating held a female art tutor hostage for over six hours and during this time sexually assaulted her. Not long after these incidents, the State Government announced that Bunbury would be the first regional prison to have personal duress alarms for staff.

In July 2005, then Justice Minister John D'Orazio announced a $9.6million upgrade of Bunbury Regional Prison to improve its security and to improve offender rehabilitation.

In September 2008 a new Pre-Release Unit was opened to house minimum security prisoners, the size of this unit was 72 beds, now increased to 110 beds.
