= Brian Cook (football administrator) =

Australian rules footballer (born 1955)

Brian Cook AM

Personal information
- Full name: Brian Carlyle Cook
- Born: 14 November 1954 (age 71); Peebles, Scotland, United Kingdom
- Original team: Box Hill (VFA)

Playing career^{1}
Years	Club	Games (Goals)
1977	Melbourne (VFL)	4 (0)
1979–1980	Subiaco (WAFL)	25 (1)
1981	East Perth (WAFL)	6 (0)
- ^{1} Playing statistics correct to the end of 1981.

Brian Carlyle Cook AM (born 14 November 1955) is a Scottish-born Australian businessman and former Australian rules football player and coach and former chief executive officer (CEO) in the Australian Football League (AFL). Cook played for a number of different clubs in several Australian states and territories, including the Box Hill Football Club in the Victorian Football Association (VFA), the Melbourne Football Club in the Victorian Football League (VFL) and the East Perth and Subiaco Football Clubs in the Western Australian National Football League (WANFL), and later captain-coached the Ainslie Football Club in the Australian Capital Territory Football League (ACTFL). After his retirement from coaching, Cook occupied positions with the Australian Sports Commission and the West Australian Football Commission, before being appointed CEO of the West Coast Eagles in 1990. He quit this position in 1998 to take up the same role with Geelong Football Club. At the conclusion of the 2021 AFL season, he took the CEO position at the Carlton Football Club. In 2026, Cook became interim CEO of Melbourne Football Club.

== Playing and coaching career ==
In 1973 and 1974, Cook played in the Victorian Football Association with Box Hill for a total of 27 senior games and 20 goals with that club.

Cook played four games with the Melbourne Football Club in 1977 after moving from Hawthorn Football Club where he played nearly 50 games in the reserves team (although none at senior VFL level).

He moved to Western Australia to pursue a Master of Education at the University of Western Australia whilst continuing his playing career with East Perth and Subiaco.

Playing for Rockingham in the Sunday Football League, Cook won the 1983 Bowden Medal for fairest and best player.

Turning to coaching, he guided East Perth to two WAFL reserves premierships and was later senior coach at Ainslie in the ACTFL in 1986.

== Sports administration career ==
Cook moved to Canberra in 1986 and took up the post of National Sports Research Coordinator with the Australian Sports Commission. He then returned to Perth and spent two years as the general manager of the West Australian Football Development Trust and a further two years as CEO of the West Australian Football Commission.

=== West Coast Eagles ===
Cook was appointed as CEO of the West Coast Eagles in 1990 and during his nine years at the Eagles, the club quadrupled its membership, dramatically increased revenue and became the first non-Victorian club to win the AFL premiership in 1992 and again in winning the 1994 premiership. Both successes were achieved against Geelong. Cook during his tenure as CEO of the Eagles also provided strong support to West Coast Eagles senior coach Mick Malthouse as one of the factor's for the Eagles on-field performance success in reaching finals in every year. At the end of the 1998 season, Cook quit his position as CEO of the West Coast Eagles. Cook was then replaced by Trevor Nisbett as CEO of the West Coast Eagles.

=== Geelong Football Club ===
Cook was then appointed as CEO of the Geelong Football Club in 1999. At the end of the 1999 season, Cook informed then-Geelong Football Club senior coach Gary Ayres that the club would not grant him a contract extension beyond the 2000 season by stating “We are in a world of pain financially, things aren’t travelling all that well … we are not really in a position to extend any contracts”. Cook then later oversaw a complete overhaul of the once-struggling club's finances in his tenure, as well as being a key supporter of former senior coach Mark Thompson along with club president Frank Costa. Cook also oversaw Geelong's three AFL premiership victories in 2007, 2009 and 2011.

Cook also oversaw an era for the Geelong Football Club that experienced finals football in 16 of their last 18 seasons as well as 13 top four finishes between 2004 and 2021, including the three premierships during that time. That on-field success has been mirrored by performance off the field, with Cook leading a four-stage redevelopment of GMHBA Stadium also known as Kardinia Park, while also ballooning the Cats’ turnover from $16 to $60 million during his tenure.

Cook has been suggested as a potential future Australian Football League CEO and was also suggested as a possible CEO for the new expansion teams, Gold Coast and Greater Western Sydney.

At the conclusion of the 2021 AFL season, Cook left his position as CEO of the Geelong Football Club after 23 years, and was replaced by Steve Hocking.

=== Carlton Football Club ===
Cook was then appointed CEO at the Carlton Football Club on 17 September 2021, replacing Cain Liddle after Liddle was sacked from the CEO position.

In Cook's tenure as CEO of Carlton, Carlton played in back-to-back finals series in 2023 and 2024, following a previous 10-year absence, which included a first preliminary final appearance since 2000. Carlton also surpassed 100,000 members for the first time in the club’s history. Also under Cook's leadership as CEO, the club expanded IKON Park to be one of the most elite training facilities in the country, providing AFL, AFLW, VFL and VFLW players with a high-performance environment and Cook oversaw the strengthened club's off-field financial position.

In October 2024, The Carlton Football Club announced a succession plan, where Cook would handover the CEO position to Carlton Deputy CEO Graham Wright at the end of 2025. On 15 August 2025, Cook officially handed over the CEO position to Wright.

=== Melbourne Football Club ===
On 29 April 2026, it was announced Cook was appointed interim CEO of Melbourne Football Club. Cook finished and retired from his role as interim CEO of Melbourne Demons on 30 October 2026.

== Order of Australia ==
Cook was appointed a Member of the Order of Australia in the 2025 King's Birthday Honours for "significant service to Australian rules football, to business, and to the community".
