= East Bunbury, Western Australia =

Suburb of Bunbury, Western Australia

East Bunbury Bunbury, Western Australia
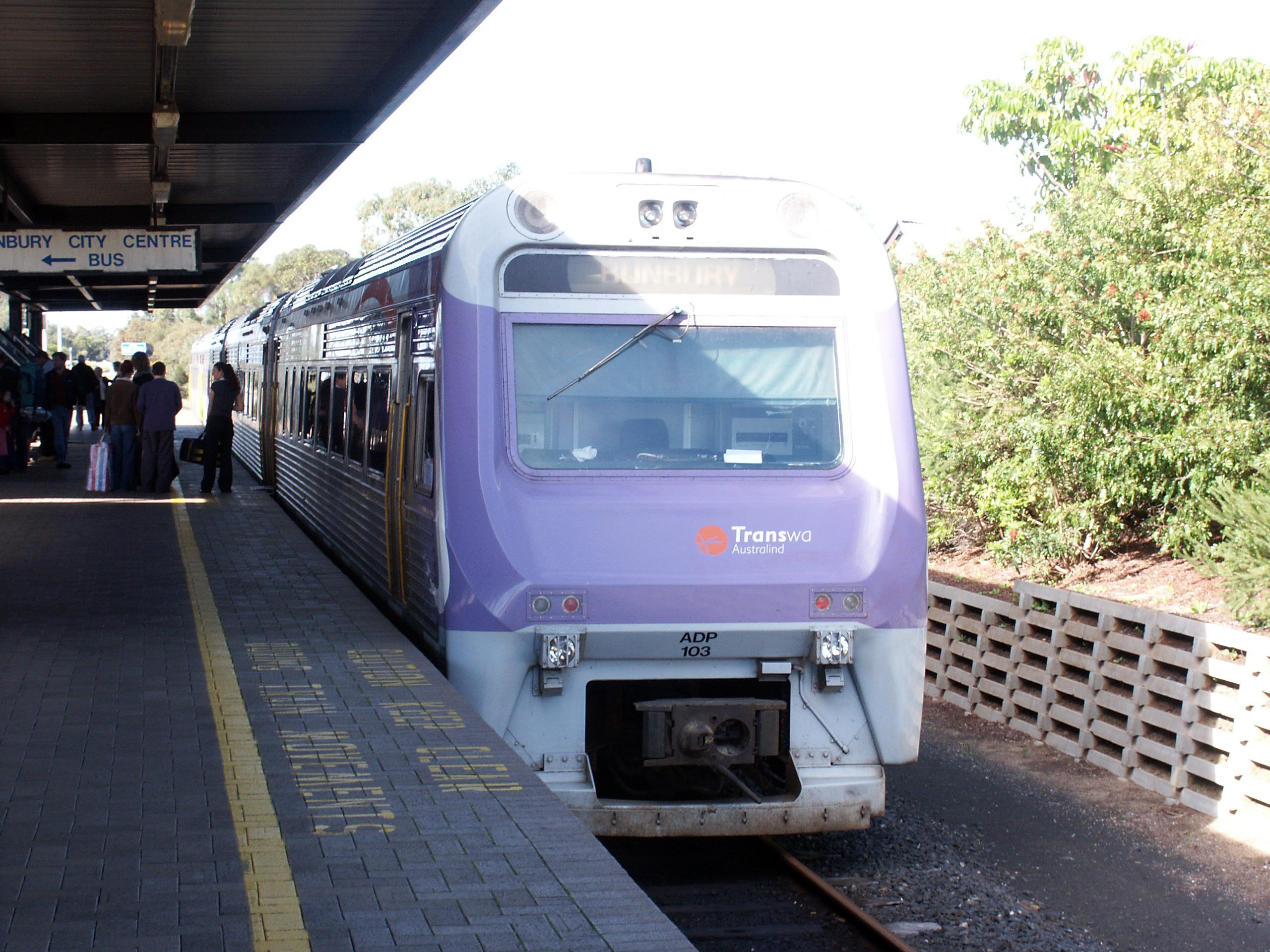
- Transwa Australind train at Bunbury Passenger Terminal

- Coordinates: 33°20′29″S 115°39′39″E
- Population: 4,019 (SAL 2021)
- Established: 1840s
- Postcode(s): 6230
- Area: 3.5 km^{2} (1.4 sq mi)
- Location: 4 km (2 mi) from Bunbury
- LGA(s): City of Bunbury
- State electorate(s): Bunbury
- Federal division(s): Forrest
Suburbs around East Bunbury:
Bunbury	Bunbury	Vittoria
South Bunbury	East Bunbury	Glen Iris
South Bunbury	Carey Park	Davenport

East Bunbury is an inner southeastern suburb of Bunbury, Western Australia 4 kilometres (2.5 mi) from the centre of Bunbury. It is located within the local government area of the City of Bunbury.

It is the location of the Bunbury Passenger Terminal, the current terminus for the South Western Railway and the Australind railway service.

== Precincts ==
East Bunbury comprises two distinct precincts.

=== Rathmines ===
Rathmines refers to the northern portion of East Bunbury. Rathmines is named after Rev Joseph Withers' home town in Ireland. Rev Joseph Withers arrived in Western Australia with his wife, two sons and niece on 18 January 1864. He had been the Chaplain on board the convict ship Dalhousie. A month later they moved to Bunbury where Withers was the Anglican Chaplain from 1864 to 1880 and again from 1889 to 1893. In 1872, Withers purchased Portion 11 of Leschenault Location 26 and in 1895, he subdivided the area which was to become known as Rathmines. The precinct is largely residential in character with most houses built after the 1960s.

=== Wollaston ===
Wollaston comprises the southern third of East Bunbury, bounded by Sandridge Road to the north, Robertson Drive and the Preston River to the east, and the railway to the south. It is mostly residential, although a light industrial area extending from central Bunbury exists west of Picton Road and the Horseshoe Lake, a remnant oxbow lake is located within Wollaston opposite the Bunbury Forum shopping centre.

Wollaston is named after Rev. John Ramsden Wollaston (1790–1856), who initially migrated privately to be the chaplain for the Western Australian Land Company's failed settlement scheme at Australind. Finding himself without a parish, together with his sons, he built a small timber chapel on his own land at "Charterhouse" alongside the Preston River, as a condition of his receiving a stipend to act as Colonial Chaplain, and was opened without consecration in September 1842 (it had to wait until 1969 for this). A churchyard was built alongside it which contains the graves of some of the Bunbury area's pioneers.

Suburban development in the area took place in the 1950s and 1960s.

== Geography ==
The suburb contains a diverse mix of residents, with a strong emphasis on trades, retail and services, and 7.2% of its population are of Italian descent.

== Facilities ==
Bunbury Forum, one of Bunbury's two main shopping centres, was opened in 1980 and is located in East Bunbury; it also contains a small neighbourhood shopping centre. The suburb contains Cooinda Primary School, on the corner of Allen and Trott Street. There are two other primary schools located within 800 metres (2,600 ft). Bunbury Catholic College (BCC), established in 1973 after the amalgamation of Marist Brother's St Fraancis Xaviers College (situated on the current BCC site and opened in 1954) and the Mercy Sister's St Josephs College (situated at the now Bunbury Regional Art Gallery, originally opened in 1897) and with a student population of about 1000, and the historic St Mark's Anglican Church (1842) are located within the suburb.

== Transport ==
The terminus of the Transwa Australind rail service is located at East Bunbury. The Bunbury Passenger Terminal was constructed in 1983–1985 to replace the central railway station (now the Bunbury Visitor Centre and bus station).

The last train to use the old station departed Bunbury on 28 May 1985, and the new terminal commenced operations the following day. The Australind passenger service was subsequently upgraded in 1987.

At present there are two departures and two arrivals of The Australind at East Bunbury every day of the week.

The 827 TransBunbury routes depart to/from the city centre regularly, with a journey time of 15–20 minutes. These services are free of charge to those connecting to/from the Australind train with a valid ticket.

All services are operated by the Public Transport Authority.
