= Hands Oval =

Sports stadium in South Bunbury, Western Australia

- JE Hands Memorial Park
- Interactive map of Hands Oval
- Former names: South Bunbury Showgrounds
- Location: Blair Street, South Bunbury, Western Australia
- Coordinates: 33°20′46″S 115°38′34″E
- Owner: City of Bunbury
- Operator: South Bunbury Football Club
- Capacity: 14,350
- Surface: Grass
- Record attendance: 13,331 (6 June 2026 - AFL match between Fremantle and North Melbourne)

Construction
- Opened: c. 1954; 72 years ago

Tenants
- South Bunbury Football Club; North Melbourne Football Club (AFL) (2025-present)

JE Hands Memorial Park, more commonly known as Hands Oval, is an oval-shaped sports stadium in South Bunbury, Western Australia. The ground is mainly used for Australian rules football matches, but has also hosted cricket and soccer.

== Sports ==
=== Australian rules football ===
The oval's primary usage is as an Australian rules football ground. The South West Football League (SWFL) is headquartered at the ground, with most finals and grand finals played there. The 2024 SWFL grand final attracted a crowd of 4,075. SWFL club the South Bunbury Football Club have played home games at the oval since the early 1950s.

Hands Oval has also hosted five West Australian Football League (WAFL) matches, with the first being held on 1 April 1984 between East Perth and Swan Districts, which was won by East Perth by 14 points. A then-record attendance of 6,573 was set at the match.

The oval has been the site of several Australian Football League (AFL) matches. The Fremantle Football Club have hosted two pre-season games, specifically in 2009 and 2011. It would take until 2025 for AFL to return to Hands Oval, when Melbourne-based side North Melbourne announced it would shift two home games per season to Western Australia, as part of a multi-year deal with the state government. West Coast and North Melbourne played before a crowd of 7,032 in a pre-season match on 1 March 2025, before the two sides met again on 8 June 2025, marking the venue's first AFL premiership match. North Melbourne defeated West Coast by ten points, in front of a then-record crowd of 12,715. That figure was broken on 6 June 2026 when 13,331 watched Fremantle defeat North Melbourne by a record margin.

	2009, Preseason
Saturday, 14 March 2009	Fremantle 20.6 (126)	def.	Carlton 12.11 (83)	Hands Oval (crowd: 5,000 est.)

	2011, Preseason
Saturday, 5 March 2011	Fremantle 9.14 (68)	def. by	Western Bulldogs 14.14 (98)	Hands Oval (crowd: 4,000 est.)	Report

	2025, Preseason
Sunday, 1 March 2025	North Melbourne 9.15 (69)	def. by	West Coast 11.5 (71)	Hands Oval (crowd: 7,032)	Report

	2025, RD13
Sunday, 8 June 2025	North Melbourne 9.8 (62)	def.	West Coast 6.16 (52)	Hands Oval (crowd: 12,715 Ground Record)	Report

	2026, RD13
Saturday, 6 June 2026	North Melbourne 4.7 (31)	def. by	Fremantle 24.11 (155)	Hands Oval (crowd: 13,331 Ground Record)	Report

=== Cricket ===
Hands Oval has hosted three List A cricket matches with the Western Warriors as the home team:

8 February, 2009
Scorecard

(Western Australia) Western Warriors; 148 (40 overs)	v	(South Australia) Southern Redbacks; 2/150 (36.4 overs)

South Australia won by 8 wickets.

5 December, 2009
Scorecard

(Victoria (state)) Victorian Bushrangers; 8/277 (50 overs)	v	(Western Australia) Western Warriors; 5/279 (49.3 overs)

Western Australia won by 5 wickets.

19 February, 2011
Scorecard

(Western Australia) Western Warriors; 6/255 (50 overs)	v	(Tasmania) Tasmanian Tigers; 189 (39.4 overs)

Western Australia won by 66 runs.

=== Soccer ===
Hands Oval hosted an A-League pre-season match between Perth Glory and Gold Coast United at the beginning of the 2009–10 season, with Gold Coast defeating Perth 1–0. A crowd of 2985 people attended the match:

25 July 2009

Perth Glory	0 - 1	Gold Coast United
	Report	Porter 23'

Attendance: 2985
Referee: David Costello

The ground hosted the Australia women's national soccer team in a friendly v Panama on July 5, 2025, losing 0-1.

== Redevelopment ==
Between 2022 and 2024, the stadium underwent a $17.5 million redevelopment. It received a brand new grandstand and new changerooms, as well as coaches boxes and a media centre.
