= Trevor Nisbett =

Australian rules football administrator (born 1957)

Trevor Nisbett (born 13 June 1957) is an Australian businessman, executive and former Australian rules footballer, who played for South Bunbury in the South West Football League.He moved to Perth in 1976 and played for the East Perth Football Club before turning to Administration in 1981, He was Football Manager and General Manager for East Perth over 3 years, before moving to Subiaco Football Club as Football Manager between 1984 and 1989. He joined the West Coast Eagles in September 1989 as Football Manager and was appointed CEO in 1999. He was appointed to the Board of the West Coast Eagles in 2003. He is the outgoing chief executive officer (CEO) of the West Coast Eagles in the Australian Football League.

== Career ==
Nisbett was born and raised in Bunbury, Western Australia. He attended Bunbury Senior High School and played senior football for South Bunbury. He attended the University of Western Australia in Perth, graduating with a Bachelor of Physical Education and a Graduate Diploma of Education. He completed the Stanford Executive Program in 2004.

After serving as football manager of the East Perth Football Club for two years, he became the General Manager of East Perth in 1983 before joining the Subiaco Football Club as football Manager between 1984 and 1989. Nisbett became involved with the West Coast Eagles in September 1989, when he was appointed football manager of the club. In 1999, Nisbett was appointed CEO of the West Coast Eagles, replacing Brian Cook. In 2000, Nisbett was awarded the inaugural Australian Sports Medal, and in 2003, the inaugural Graeme Samuel Award, receiving a $20,000 award. He is also a deputy chairman of the Waalitj Foundation. He is a Hall of Fame and Life Member of the West Coast Eagles, a Life member of the AFL and WAFC and a Life Member of the Subiaco Football Club.

Sporting positions
Preceded by Brian Cook	CEO of the West Coast Eagles; 1999–	Succeeded by incumbent
