= South Bunbury, Western Australia =

South Bunbury
- Suburb
- Interactive map of South Bunbury
- Coordinates: 33.35°S 115.63°E
- Country: Australia
- State: Western Australia
- LGA: City of Bunbury
- Location: 2 km (1.2 mi) South of Bunbury

Government
  - State electorate: Bunbury
  - Federal division: Forrest

Area
  - Total: 6.5 km^{2} (2.5 sq mi)

Population
  - Total: 8,810 (SAL 2021)
- Postcode: 6230
Suburbs around South Bunbury
	Bunbury	East Bunbury
Indian Ocean	South Bunbury	Carey Park
	Withers	Carey Park

South Bunbury is a beachside suburb in Bunbury, Western Australia. It is located in the local government area of the City of Bunbury. The South Bunbury Football Club's home ground is located at Hands Oval in South Bunbury.

The Bunbury Dynamos Football Club play at Forest Park in South Bunbury.

The suburb contains three primary schools, South Bunbury Primary School, Adam Road Primary School, and St Mary's Catholic Primary School, a government high school, Newton Moore Senior High School, and an education support school, College Row School.

The Bunbury Wildlife Park (previously known as Big Swamp Wildlife Park) is located in the suburb. There are more than 50 species of mostly native Australian animals at the park including wombats, kangaroos, wallabies, quokkas, potoroos, dingoes, native parrots, lizards, pythons and tree frog.
