= Vittoria, Western Australia =

Vittoria
- Suburb
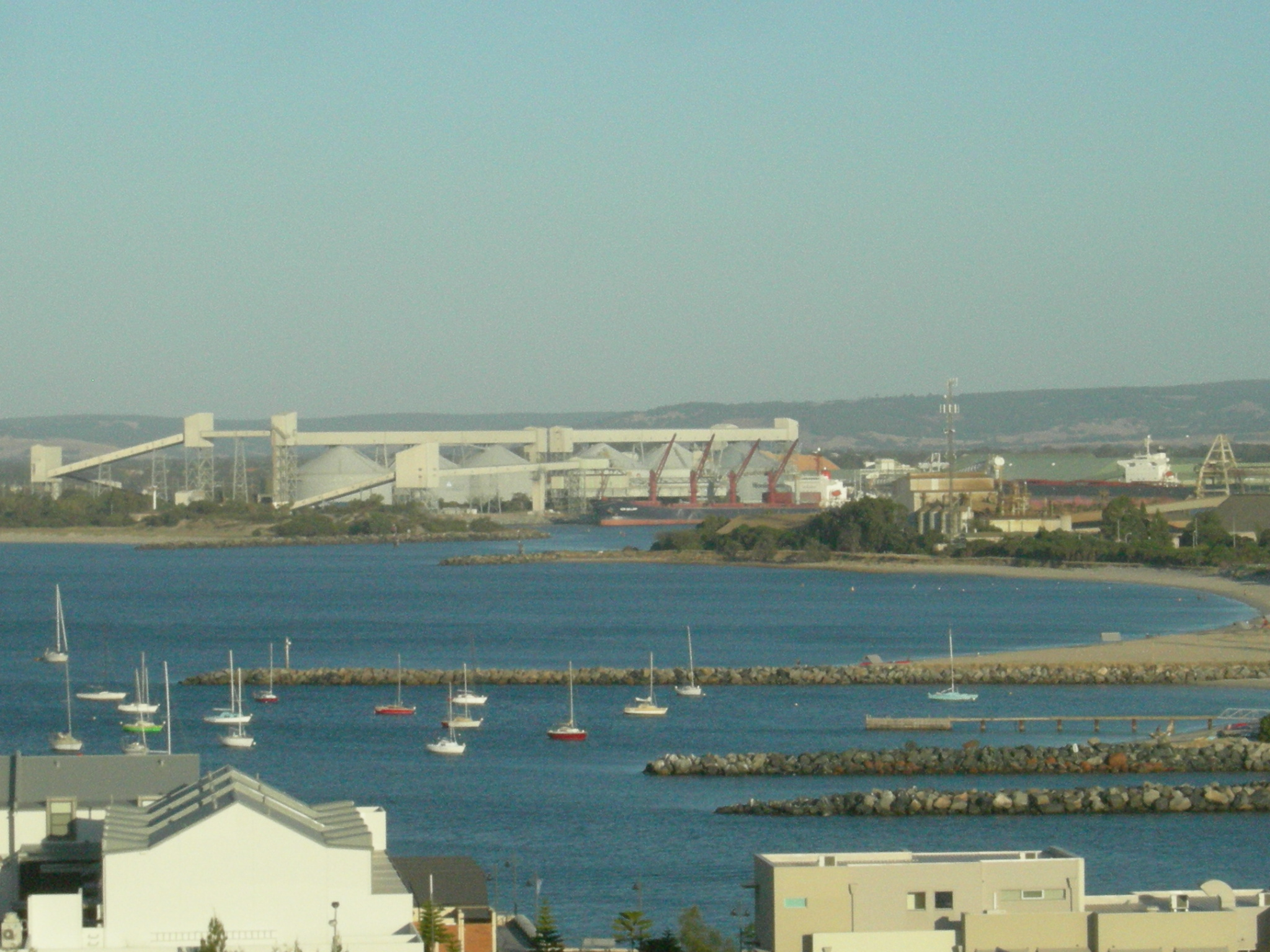
- Bunbury port viewed from the Bunbury city centre

- Interactive map of Vittoria
- Coordinates: 33°19′S 115°38′E
- Country: Australia
- State: Western Australia
- City: Bunbury
- LGA: City of Bunbury
- Location: 175 km (109 mi) SSW of Perth

Government
  - State electorate: Bunbury
  - Federal division: Forrest

Area
  - Total: 8 km^{2} (3.1 sq mi)

Population
  - Total: 0 (SAL 2021)
- Postcode: 6230
Suburbs around Vittoria
Indian Ocean	Leschenault	Australind
Bunbury	Vittoria	Pelican Point
East Bunbury	Glen Iris	Glen Iris

Vittoria is a suburb of the city of Bunbury comprising the Bunbury port. The suburb is located in the local government area of the City of Bunbury.

== Bunbury port ==
The Bunbury port is located in Vittoria. The port lands also extend into the adjacent suburb of Pelican Point.

The Bunbury Harbour Board was created by an act of Parliament to control the port from 1 July 1909. The name was changed to Bunbury Port Authority in October 1967. On 1 October 2014 the Bunbury Port Authority, Albany Port Authority, and Esperance Port Authority merged to become the Southern Ports Authority.

The port distributes products from the South West region worldwide. Rail and road links enable the port to capitalise on cargo throughput. The major commodities that the port caters for are alumina, mineral sands, woodchips, caustic soda and silica sand.
