= George Kołodziej =

Australian catholic bishop

The Most Reverend George Kołodziej S.D.S.
- Bishop of Bunbury
- Diocese: Bunbury

Orders
- Ordination: 28 May 1994 by Franciszek Antoni Macharski
- Consecration: 19 March 2025 by Timothy Costelloe

Personal details
- Born: Jerzy Joseph Kołodziej; 17 May 1968 (age 58) Dobra, Poland
- Denomination: Catholic Church

George (Jerzy) Kołodziej S.D.S. (born 17 May 1968) is a Polish-Australian Catholic priest and Bishop of the Roman Catholic Diocese of Bunbury.

== Early life ==
Kołodziej was born in Dobra, Poland, part of the Diocese of Tarnów, renowned as the most religious diocese in Poland.

He grew up in Wilczyce, Lesser Poland Voivodeship, near Mszana Dolna, where he said the mountainous landscape gave him a continuous reminder of God's presence. He cited the faith of the people, the piety of his parents, the shrines, the roadside crosses, the sign of the cross on bread before cutting, the May Day gatherings at the shrines and the communal Mass on Sundays as things that build a deep faith in God in him.

In 1987, at the age of 19, he entered the Society of the Divine Savior, known as the Salvatorians. He professed his religious vows on 8 September 1988 and took perpetual vows in 1992. He completed his studies at the Salvatorian Major Seminary in Bagno. On 28 May 1994, he was ordained a priest for the Society of the Divine Savior, by Cardinal Franciszek Antoni Macharski at the Our Lady of Fatima Shrine in Trzebinia.

== Career ==
=== Priesthood ===
Following his ordination, Kołodziej was sent to Western Australia by his order. He served in the parish of Greenmount initially, before being appointed chaplain of Chisholm Catholic College, Perth. He was elected vice-superior of the Salvatorian Region of Australia in 1999.

He moved to New South Wales in 2001, to serve in the Diocese of Broken Bay. He served as chaplain of St Leo's Catholic College, Waitara while serving as assistant priest in Pymble and East Gosford. He was appointed parish priest of Pittwater in 2008 and served there for 10 years until he was elected superior of the Salvatorians in Australian in 2018.

Kołodziej holds a masters degree in both theology and pastoral care/psychotherapy. He also competed a postgraduate diploma in addiction studies. While serving on the Central Coast, he engaged in clinical work as a psychotherapist at a local rehabilitation centre, providing counselling and support to men recovering from drug and alcohol addiction.

As a parish priest, he implemented Alcoholics Anonymous and Narcotics Anonymous programs to accompany people on their recovery from addiction. He said they were valuable tools for the Church, helping people to stabilise their lives and return to the community.

=== Episcopate ===
On 6 January 2025, he was appointed Bishop of the Diocese of Bunbury by Pope Francis. The diocese had been without a bishop for 18 months following the resignation of Bishop Gerard Holohan on 30 June 2023. His episcopal ordination took place in St Patrick's Cathedral, Bunbury on 19 March 2025.

Following his consecration, Kołodziej became the second Salvatorian bishop to serve in an Australia diocese, with Bishop Karol Kulczycki SDS serving as Bishop of Port Pirie since 2020.

As Bishop, he hoped he could implement programs within the Diocese of Bunbury to help people struggling with mental health issues, depression, and other mental illnesses.

In November 2025, the Australian Catholic Bishops Conference's Commission for Evangelisation, Laity and Ministry appointed him the bishop delegate for youth.

In 2026, he convoked a Diocesan Synodal Assembly to bring together the people of the Diocese in a spirit of listening, to discover where God was calling the Diocese and how it could respond with faith. He also announced the establishment of a Pastoral Life and Mission Centre, to bring together different mission areas of the Diocese to work more collaboratively.

Catholic Church titles
| Preceded by Gerard Holohan | Bishop of Bunbury; 2025–present | Incumbent |
