= Dalyellup, Western Australia =

Dalyellup
- Suburb
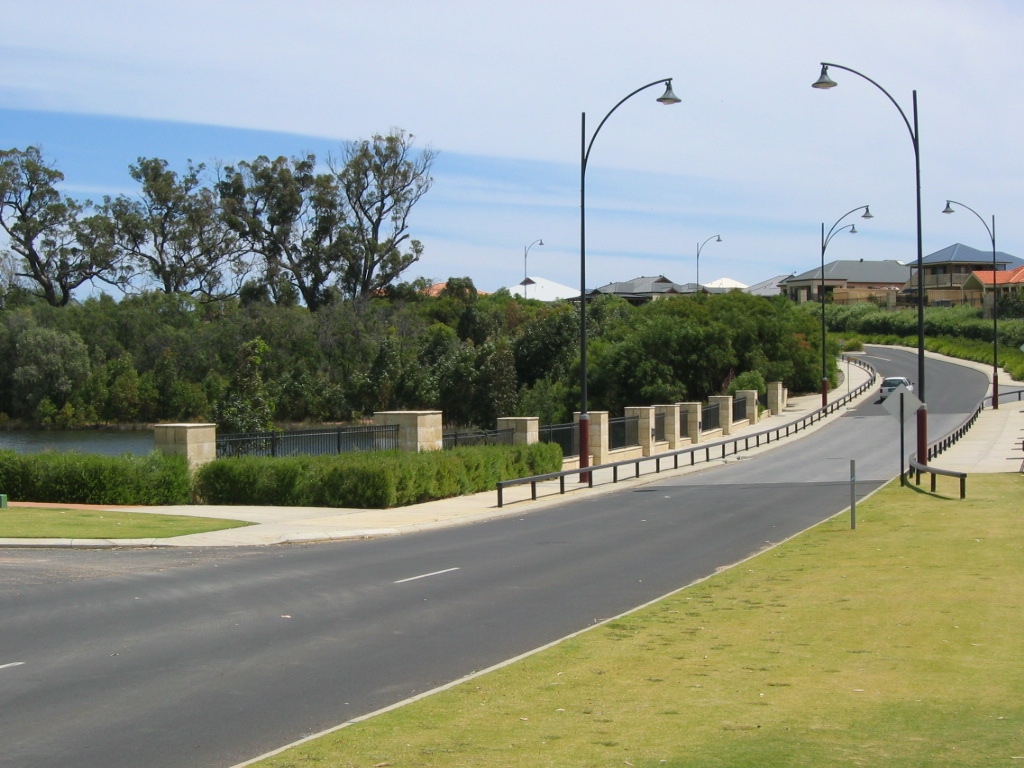
- Dalyellup Centre

- Interactive map of Dalyellup
- Coordinates: 33°24′07″S 115°37′30″E
- Country: Australia
- State: Western Australia
- City: Bunbury
- LGA: Shire of Capel
- Location: 11 km (6.8 mi) SSW of Bunbury
- Established: 1999

Government
  - State electorate: Bunbury
  - Federal division: Forrest

Area
  - Total: 16.5 km^{2} (6.4 sq mi)

Population
  - Total: 9,770 (SAL 2021)
- Postcode: 6230
Suburbs around Dalyellup
	Usher	College Grove
Indian Ocean	Dalyellup	Gelorup
	Stratham

Dalyellup, (pronounced dal-YEL-up), is an outer northern suburb of the Shire of Capel local government area. The suburb was established in 1999 when the Department of Housing and Works entered into a joint venture with Satterley Property Group to develop Dalyellup Beach Estate, a master-planned community which was expected to yield 3,000 lots by its completion in 2012.

In the original advertising campaign, Dalyellup was heavily promoted as "A village in the Forest by the Sea".

== Facilities ==
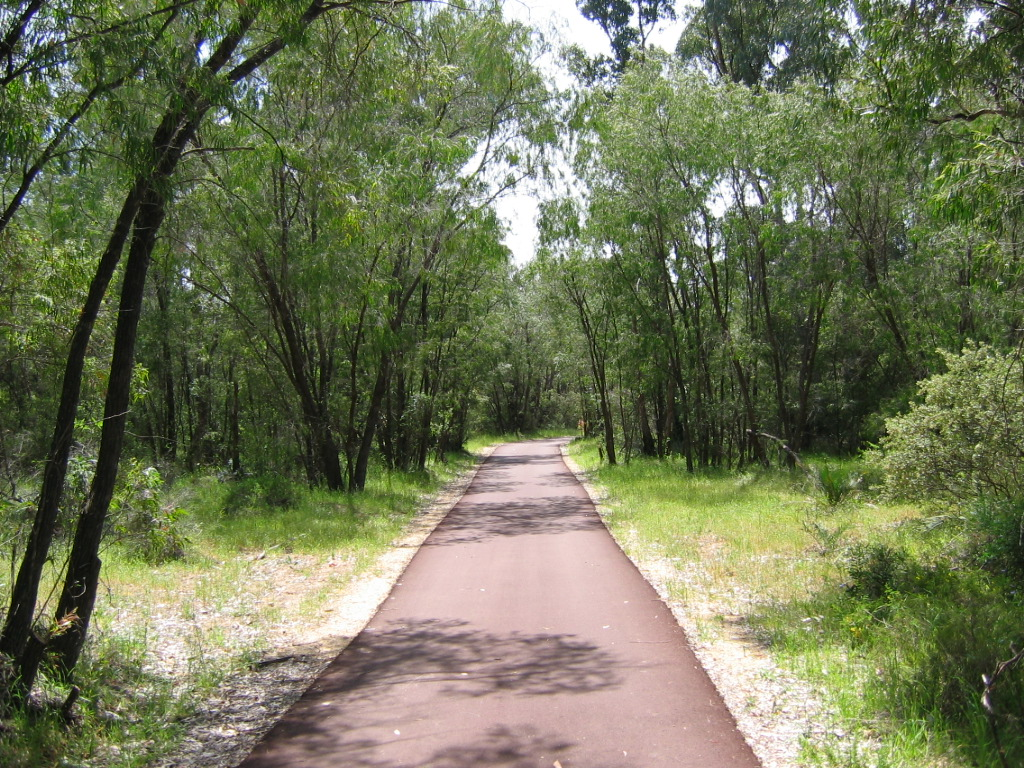
Tuart Walk.

Two large areas within the suburb were set aside as open space - about 100 hectares (250 acres) of pristine tuart forest, officially named the Usher-Dalyellup Regional Park in 2003, with an interpretative walkway leading to Ocean Drive in neighbouring Usher which was opened on 8 October 2007 by the Minister for the South West, and about 120 hectares (297 acres) of dunes and foreshore to the south. A small shopping centre provides for daily needs, but most residents used Bunbury's shopping facilities, until the new shopping centre opened in 2015.

The placement of a larger shopping centre was implemented due to the rapidly increasing population.

Dalyellup also has a large 106-room aged care and community housing project, managed by a local aged care provider. The facility, known as Bethanie Dalyellup, takes over-55's from the Department of Housing. It was officially opened on 10 October 2011 by Western Australian Senator Louise Pratt.

== Education ==
There are three public schools in the area, Dalyellup Primary School, Tuart Forest Primary School, and Dalyellup College. Dalyellup Primary School opened in 2001 in the local shopping centre with 91 students, moving into its own premises in April 2004. In 2009 Dalyellup Secondary College (later Dalyellup College) was established and the primary school and college became a two-campus school, later separating in 2013. Bunbury Tuart Forest Primary School was established in 2013. Baptist College was established in 2019, previously on the site of Ocean Forest Lutheran College. Dalyellup is about 6 kilometres (4 mi) from the Bunbury campus of Edith Cowan University.

== Transport ==
Dalyellup is served by the 842 bus route from Park's Centre Shopping Centre, Carey Park and 843 route from Bunbury's central bus station, terminating at the end of Norton Promenade on the coast with a journey time of approximately 35 minutes. The route is operated by TransBunbury for the Public Transport Authority.

== Waste dump controversy ==
In 2009 it was reported that a titanium dioxide refining company called Millennium Inorganic Chemicals had been dumping waste at a Dalyellup site for the past two decades. Residents had been calling for the closure of the site because of concerns over the impact of the waste and its proximity to a residential estate. Two councillors resigned in protest when the Capel council voted to give the waste facility permission to continue dumping waste for another three years, and calls to close the site continued.
