= 2010 Western Bulldogs season =

Western Bulldogs
2010 season
- President: David Smorgon
- Coach: Rodney Eade
- Captain: Brad Johnson
- Home ground: Etihad Stadium
- Pre-season competition: Champions
- AFL season: 4th
- Finals series: Preliminary finalist
- Best and Fairest: Ryan Griffen
- Leading goalkicker: Barry Hall (80)

The 2010 Western Bulldogs season was the club's 85th since their introduction to the VFL/AFL in 1925. The club made, but lost, the preliminary final for the third consecutive season.

== NAB Cup and Premiership Season Results ==
2010 NAB Cup

Round	Opposition	Time	Date	Home/Away	Venue	Score	Result/Margin	Broadcaster	TV
Round 1	Brisbane Lions	4:40 p.m.	Saturday 13 February	Home	Manuka Oval	53–45	WON by 8	Fox Sports 1	Live
Quarter Final	Hawthorn	7:40 p.m.	Friday 26 February	Away	Etihad Stadium	54-111	WON by 57	Seven Network	Delayed by 1 hour
Semi Final	Port Adelaide	7:40 p.m.	Friday 5 March	Home	Etihad Stadium	92–89	WON by 3	Seven Network	Delayed by 1 hour
Grand Final	St Kilda	7:10 p.m.	Saturday 13 March	Home	Etihad Stadium	104–64	WON by 40	Ten Network	Live

2010 Home And Away Season

Round	Opposition	Time	Date	Home/Away	Venue	Score	Result/Margin	Broadcaster	TV	Ladder Position
One	Collingwood	2:10pm	Sunday 28 March	Home	Etihad Stadium	13.15 (93)-19.15 (129)	LOST by 36	Seven Network	Delayed by 1 hour	12th
Two	Richmond	4:40pm	Sunday 4 April	Away	MCG	7.6 (48)-17.18 (120)	WON by 72	Fox Sports 1	Live	10th
Three	Hawthorn	2:10pm	Sunday 11 April	Home	Etihad Stadium	14.16 (100)-12.12 (84)	WON by 16	Seven Network	Delayed by 1 hour	8th
Four	Brisbane Lions	7:10pm	Saturday 17 April	Away	Gabba	13.23 (101)- 12.7 (79)	LOST by 22	Fox Sports 1	Live	8th
Five	Adelaide	7:40pm	Friday 23 April	Home	Etihad Stadium	18.13 (121)-10.12 (72)	WON by 49	Seven Network	Delayed by 1 hour	8th
Six	St Kilda	7:40pm	Friday 30 April	Home	Etihad Stadium	6.10 (46)–7.7 (49)	LOST by 3	Seven Network	Delayed by 1 hour	8th
Seven	Melbourne	7:40pm	Friday 7 May	Away	MCG	9.12 (66)–10.10 (70)	WON by 4	Seven Network	Delayed by 1 hour	8th
Eight	Sydney Swans	2:10pm	Saturday 15 May	Home	Manuka Oval	14.17 (101)–9.9 (63)	WON by 38	Ten Network	Live	4th
Nine	North Melbourne	2:10pm	Saturday 22 May	Away	Etihad Stadium	7.15 (57)-20.7 (127)	WON by 70	Ten Network	Delayed by 1 hour	4th
Ten	Essendon	7:40pm	Friday 28 May	Away	Etihad Stadium	15.9 (99)–14.6 (90)	LOST by 9	Seven Network	Delayed by 1 hour	5th
Eleven	Collingwood	4:40pm	Sunday 6 June	Away	Etihad Stadium	17.11 (113)–16.7 (103)	LOST by 10	Fox Sports 1	Live	6th
Twelve	Brisbane Lions	2:10pm	Sunday 13 June	Home	Etihad Stadium	17.19 (121)-8.8 (56)	WON by 65	Seven Network	Delayed 1 hour	5th
Thirteen	West Coast Eagles	4:40pm	Sunday 20 June	Away	Subiaco Oval	9.5 (59)-17.17 (119)	WON by 60	Fox Sports 1	Live	5th
Fourteen	Hawthorn	7:40pm	Friday 2 July	Away	MCG	12.7 (79)-11.10 (76)	LOST by 3	Seven Network	Delayed 1 hour	5th
Fifteen	Carlton	4:40pm	Sunday 11 July	Away	Etihad Stadium	8.10 (58)–20.6 (126)	WON by 68	Fox Sports 1	Live	5th
Sixteen	Port Adelaide	7:10pm	Saturday 17 July	Home	TIO Stadium	12.11 (83)–7.5 (47)	WON by 36	Ten Network	Live	4th
Seventeen	Fremantle	1:10pm	Sunday 25 July	Home	Etihad Stadium	24.14 (158)–12.4 (76)	WON by 82	Fox Sports 1	Live	4th
Eighteen	North Melbourne	2:10pm	Sunday 1 August	Home	Etihad Stadium	22.11 (143)-10.12 (72)	WON by 71	Seven Network	Delayed 1 hour	4th
Nineteen	Adelaide	4:10pm	Sunday 8 August	Away	AAMI Stadium	7.11 (53)–8.13 (61)	WON by 8	Fox Sports 1	Live	4th
Twenty	Geelong Cats	7:10pm	Saturday 14 August	Home	Etihad Stadium	9.6 (60)–25.11 (161)	LOST by 101	Ten Network	Delayed by 1 hour	4th
Twenty One	Sydney Swans	7:10pm	Saturday 21 August	Away	SCG	17.12 (114)–10.10 (70)	LOST by 42	Fox Sports 1	Live	4th
Twenty Two	Essendon	7.10pm	Saturday 28 August	Home	Etihad Stadium	17.5 (107)–11.12 (78)	WON by 29	Ten Network	Delayed by 1 hour	4th

2010 Finals Series

Round	Opposition	Time	Date	Home/Away	Venue	Score	Result/Margin	Broadcaster	TV
Qualifying Final	Collingwood	7:20pm	Saturday 4 September	Away	MCG	17.22 (124)–8.14 (62)	LOST by 62	Ten Network	Delayed by 30 minutes
Semi Final	Sydney	7:20pm	Saturday 11 September	Home	MCG	11.11 (77) – 10.12 (72)	WON by 5	Ten Network	Delayed by 30 minutes
Preliminary Final	St Kilda	7:20pm	Saturday 18 September	Away	MCG	13.10 (88)–8.16 (64)	LOST by 24	Ten Network	Delayed by 30 minutes

== Ladder ==
2010 AFL ladder
Pos	Team	Pld	W	L	D	PF	PA	PP	Pts	
1	Collingwood (P)	22	17	4	1	2349	1658	141.7	70	Finals series
2	Geelong	22	17	5	0	2518	1702	147.9	68	Finals series
3	St Kilda	22	15	6	1	1935	1591	121.6	62	Finals series
4	Western Bulldogs	22	14	8	0	2174	1734	125.4	56	Finals series
5	Sydney	22	13	9	0	2017	1863	108.3	52	Finals series
6	Fremantle	22	13	9	0	2168	2087	103.9	52	Finals series
7	Hawthorn	22	12	9	1	2044	1847	110.7	50	Finals series
8	Carlton	22	11	11	0	2143	1983	108.1	44	Finals series
9	North Melbourne	22	11	11	0	1930	2208	87.4	44	
10	Port Adelaide	22	10	12	0	1749	2123	82.4	40	
11	Adelaide	22	9	13	0	1763	1870	94.3	36	
12	Melbourne	22	8	13	1	1863	1971	94.5	34	
13	Brisbane Lions	22	7	15	0	1775	2158	82.3	28	
14	Essendon	22	7	15	0	1930	2402	80.3	28	
15	Richmond	22	6	16	0	1714	2348	73.0	24	
16	West Coast	22	4	18	0	1773	2300	77.1	16	

Source: AFL ladder
Rules for classification: 1) points; 2) percentage; 3) number of points for.
(P) Premiers

== See also ==
- 2010 AFL season
- 2010 AFL Grand Final
- 2009 Western Bulldogs season
