= Carey Park, Western Australia =

Suburb of Bunbury, Western Australia

Carey Park
- Suburb
- Coordinates: 33.36°S 115.65°E
- Country: Australia
- State: Western Australia
- LGA: City of Bunbury
- Location: 172 km (107 mi) from Perth; 4 km (2.5 mi) from Bunbury

Government
  - State electorate: Bunbury
  - Federal division: Forrest

Area
  - Total: 4.1 km^{2} (1.6 sq mi)

Population
  - Total: 5,155 (SAL 2021)
- Postcode: 6230
Suburbs around Carey Park
South Bunbury	East Bunbury	East Bunbury
South Bunbury	Carey Park	Davenport
Withers	College Grove	Davenport

Carey Park is a suburb of the City of Bunbury in the South West region of Western Australia.

Carey Park is located on the traditional land of the Wardandi people of the Noongar nation.

The suburb contains a number of heritage-listed sites, among them the Carey Park Primary School and the former St Elizabeth of Hungary Church. Like similar areas in the region, Carey Park has had issues of drainage.
