= Drummin, County Mayo =

Village in County Mayo, Ireland

Coordinates: 53.695°N 9.61°W

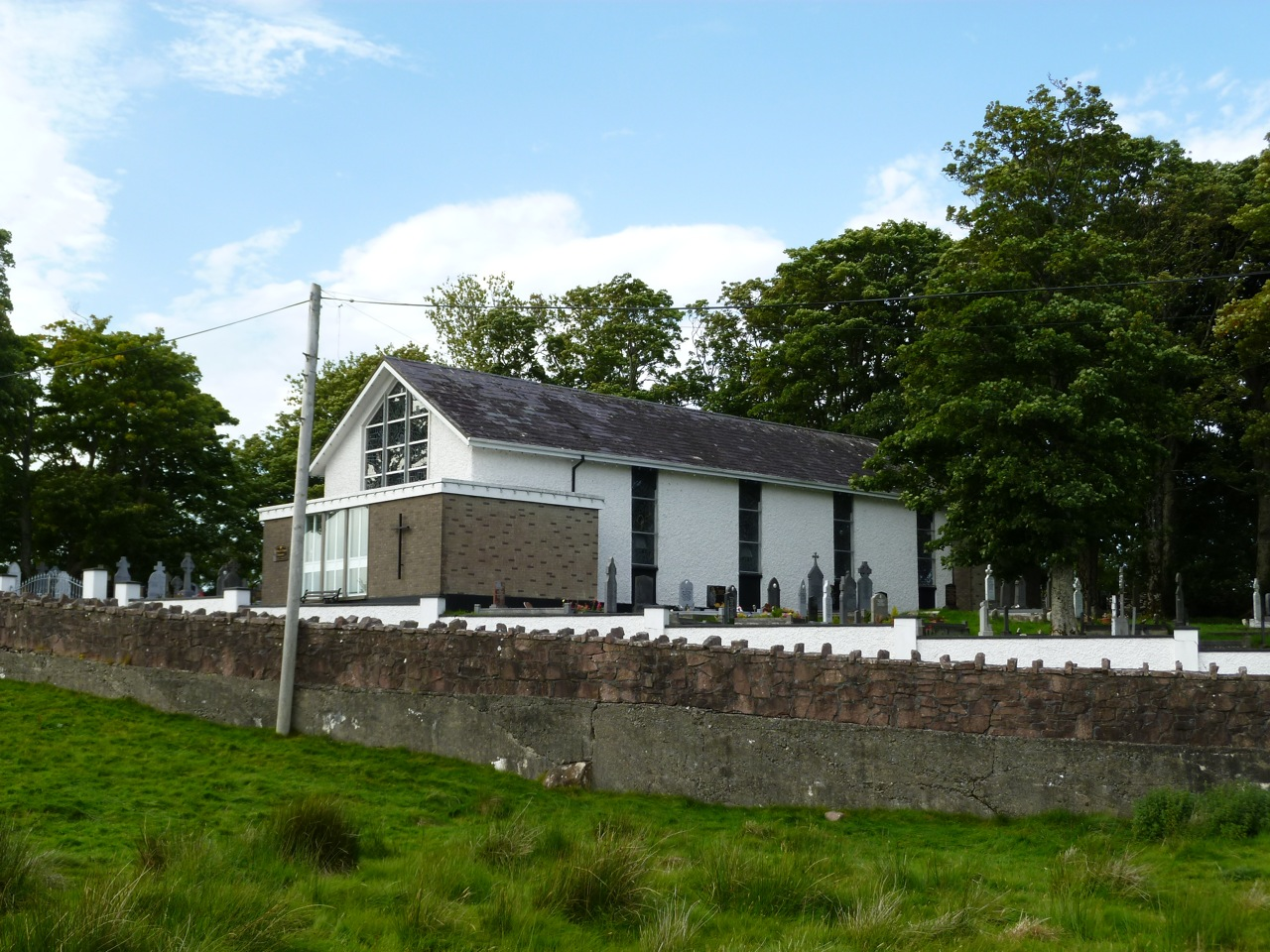
St. Mary's church, Drummin

Drummin (Irish: An Dromainn, meaning 'the ridge') is a small village in County Mayo, Ireland, near the town of Westport.

The village has a church, St. Mary's, a national (primary) school, and a public house. Drummin National School, also known as Scoil Náisiúnta Coill Mór, had 20 pupils enrolled as of 2010. The area previously had a post office, but this has since closed.

Situated close to Croagh Patrick, Drummin is known for its scenery and rumours about gold.

== See also ==
- List of towns and villages in Ireland
