= Glen Iris, Western Australia =

Suburb of Bunbury, Western Australia

Glen Iris
- Suburb
- Coordinates: 33.34°S 115.68°E
- Country: Australia
- State: Western Australia
- LGA: City of Bunbury
- Location: 169 km (105 mi) from Perth; 5 km (3.1 mi) from Bunbury

Government
  - State electorate: Bunbury
  - Federal division: Forrest

Area
  - Total: 4.9 km^{2} (1.9 sq mi)

Population
  - Total: 3,143 (SAL 2021)
- Postcode: 6230
Suburbs around Glen Iris
Vittoria	Vittoria	Pelican Point
East Bunbury	Glen Iris	Picton
Davenport	Davenport	Picton

Glen Iris is a suburb of the City of Bunbury in the South West region of Western Australia.

Glen Iris is located on the traditional land of the Wardandi people of the Noongar nation.
