= Usher, Western Australia =

Usher
- Suburb
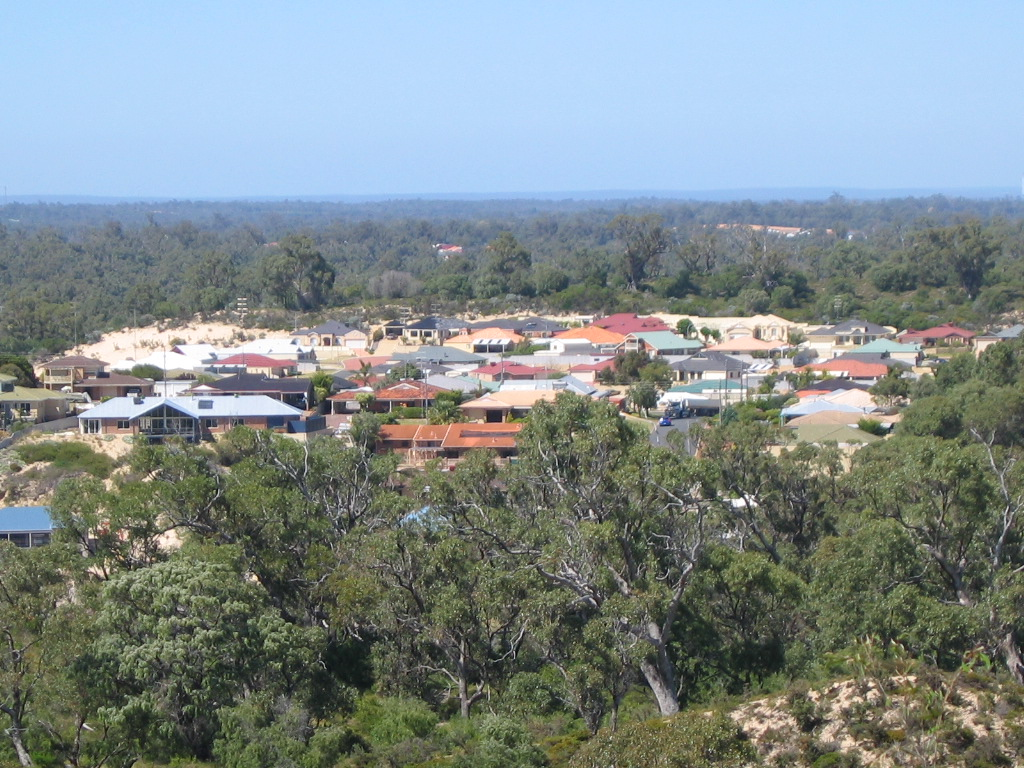
- Usher as seen from Maidens Hill Reserve

- Interactive map of Usher
- Coordinates: 33°22′48″S 115°37′41″E
- Country: Australia
- State: Western Australia
- City: Bunbury
- LGA: City of Bunbury
- Location: 7 km (4.3 mi) SSW of Bunbury
- Established: 1980s

Government
  - State electorate: Bunbury
  - Federal division: Forrest

Area
  - Total: 3.8 km^{2} (1.5 sq mi)

Population
  - Total: 2,137 (SAL 2021)
- Postcode: 6230
Suburbs around Usher
	Withers	College Grove
Indian Ocean	Usher	College Grove
	Dalyellup	Gelorup

Usher is an outer southern suburb of Bunbury, a city in Western Australia, located within the City of Bunbury local government area. Located between the Indian Ocean coast and Bussell Highway, it is the southernmost continuous suburb in Bunbury's metropolitan area and was named after Patrick Usher, the mayor of Bunbury from 1972 to 1983.

== Demographics ==
In the 2016 census, Usher had a population of 2,168, down from 2,251 in 2006.

According to 2016 Census figures, Usher residents had a median age of 36, and the median weekly personal income for people aged 15 years and over in Usher was $586. The population of Usher was predominantly Australian-born, with 76.1% as at the 2016 census, while 5.7% were born in England and 2.4% in New Zealand. The percentage of residents that identified as Indigenous Australians was 5.7%.

The most popular religious affiliations in descending order in the 2016 census were no religion, Anglican, Roman Catholic, Not Stated, and Christian. For those aged 15 and over, 42.8% were reported as being in a registered marriage, 14.2% in a de facto marriage, and 43.0% single.

== Facilities ==
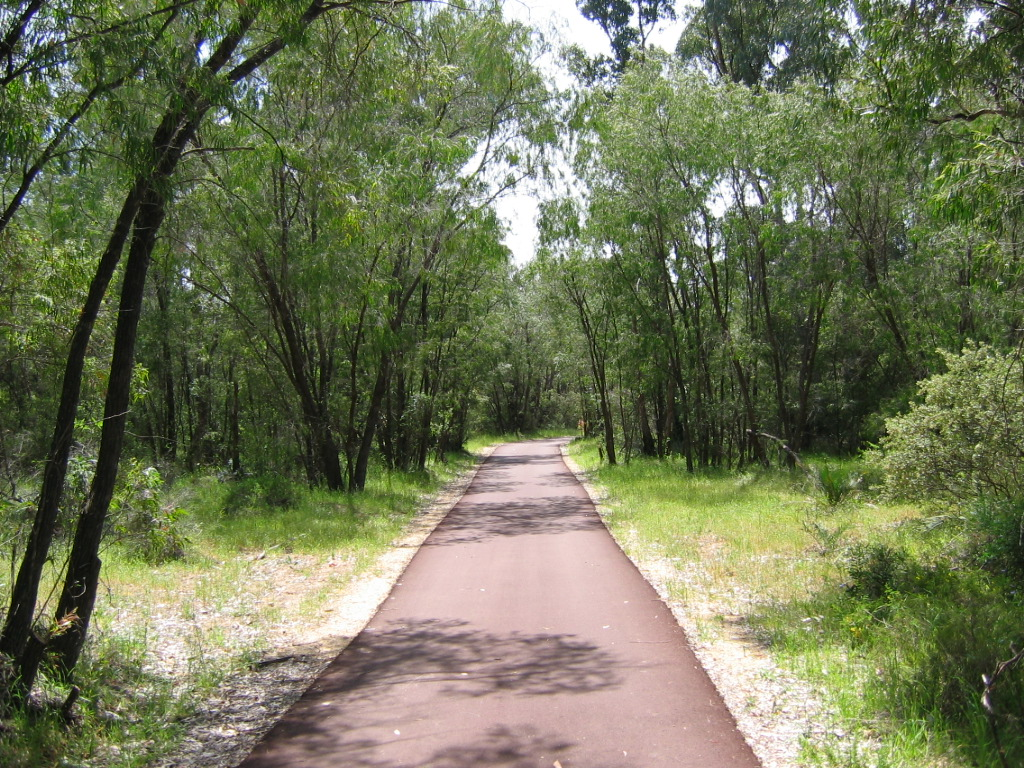
Tuart Walk.

Two large areas within the suburb have been set aside as open space - the southern part contains tuart forest, officially named the Usher-Dalyellup Regional Park in 2003, with an interpretative walkway leading to Maidment Parade in neighbouring Dalyellup which was opened on 8 October 2006 by the Minister for the South West, and a western section extending southward from Maidens Hill Reserve.

== Education ==
No schools are located within Usher's boundaries, but in Withers to the north, Maidens Park Primary School (formerly Withers Primary School) and a Catholic primary school, St Joseph's, provide for Usher residents' educational needs. Usher is within the catchment area for Newton Moore Senior High School and is about 2.5 kilometres (1.6 mi) from the Bunbury campus of Edith Cowan University.

== Transport ==
Usher is served by the 301 and 302 routes from Bunbury's central bus station, terminating at the intersection of Mosedale Avenue and Nalbarra Drive, with a journey time of between 12 and 22 minutes. The route is operated by TransBunbury for the Public Transport Authority.
