= Withers, Western Australia =

Suburb of Bunbury

Withers
- Suburb
- Interactive map of Withers
- Coordinates: 33.366°S 115.63°E
- Country: Australia
- State: Western Australia
- LGA: City of Bunbury
- Location: 2 km (1.2 mi) South of Bunbury
- Established: 1969

Government
  - State electorate: Bunbury
  - Federal division: Forrest

Area
  - Total: 4.4 km^{2} (1.7 sq mi)

Population
  - Total: 2,979 (SAL 2021)
- Postcode: 6230
Suburbs around Withers
	South Bunbury	Carey Park
Indian Ocean	Withers	College Grove
	Usher

Withers is a beachside suburb in Bunbury, Western Australia. It is a primarily residential suburb with a small amount of retail activity. The suburb, which was named after state Member of Parliament and Bunbury mayor Frederick Withers, was developed by the State Housing Commission in the 1960s as the Withers Housing Estate. The layout of the suburb was influenced by the Radburn design philosophy. Building began in 1969 and was completed by 1975. The suburb has the lowest average personal income rate in Bunbury and a history of antisocial problems. It contains two primary schools: the government Maidens Park Primary School, named after the nearby Maidens Reserve, which opened in 1977 and was known as Withers Primary School until its official renaming in 2012, and St Joseph's Catholic Primary School, which was established in 1978. A proposal was floated to rename the suburb in 2011.
