= Gerard Holohan =

Australian Roman Catholic bishop

The Most Reverend Gerard Holohan
- 4th Bishop of the Roman Catholic Diocese of Bunbury
- Diocese: Bunbury
- Appointed: 11 June 2001
- Installed: 5 September 2001
- Term ended: 30 June 2023
- Predecessor: Peter Quinn
- Successor: George Kołodziej

Orders
- Ordination: 4 September 1971 by Archbishop Launcelot Goody
- Consecration: 5 September 2001 by Bishop Peter Quinn

Personal details
- Born: Gerard Joseph Holohan; 5 September 1947 (age 79) Perth, Australia
- Denomination: Roman Catholic
- Education: St Charles Seminary, Guildford St Francis Xavier Seminary, Adelaide
- Motto: To love, to serve like Christ

Styles of Gerard Holohan
- Reference style: The Most Reverend
- Spoken style: My Lord
- Religious style: Bishop

Gerard Holohan (born 5 September 1947) is Roman Catholic priest who served as the bishop of the Diocese of Bunbury from 2001 to 2023.

== Early life ==
Holohan was born and baptised on 5 September 1947. He was educated by the Sisters of Mercy at Our Lady Help of Christians Primary School in Perth, and by the Christian Brothers, first at St Francis Xavier College, then at the Christian Brothers' College, St George's Terrace and later at Trinity College.

He entered St Charles Seminary Guildford in 1965 for philosophical studies, and then moved to St Francis Xavier Seminary, Adelaide in 1968 to study theology.

== Priesthood ==
Holohan was ordained to the priesthood on 4 September 1971 by Perth Archbishop Launcelot Goody. He was initially appointed to serve in the Cottesloe parish before serving in the parish of Subiaco until 1975.

Archbishop Goody asked him to spend his ministry in Catholic education and between 1975 and 1981, he completed postgraduate degrees in Education and Arts at Murdoch University in Perth, and Fordham University in the United States. In 1980, he became chaplain and religious education coordinator at Newman College, Churchlands and in 1981, he was appointed Director of Religious Education. He also served as Governor of the University of Notre Dame Australia.

He became an affiliated member of the Marist Brothers Order in 1990.

== Episcopacy ==
Holohan was appointed as Bishop of Bunbury by Pope John Paul II on 11 June 2001, replacing Bishop Peter Quinn who retired in 2000. He was ordained a bishop and installed on 5 September 2001, becoming the fourth Bishop of Bunbury. As required by canon law, Holohan tendered his resignation to the Vatican when he turned 75 in 2022. It was accepted on 30 June 2023.

Catholic Church titles
Preceded by Peter Quinn	Bishop of Bunbury; 2001–2023	Succeeded by George Kołodziej
