= Gelorup, Western Australia =

Locality in the Shire of Capel, Western Australia

Gelorup
- Suburb
- Interactive map of Gelorup
- Coordinates: 33.43°S 115.64°E
- Country: Australia
- State: Western Australia
- LGA: Shire of Capel
- Location: 179 km (111 mi) from Perth; 10 km (6.2 mi) from Bunbury; 19 km (12 mi) from Capel

Government
  - State electorates: Bunbury; Collie-Preston
  - Federal division: Forrest

Area
  - Total: 24.8 km^{2} (9.6 sq mi)

Population
  - Total: 2,255 (SAL 2021)
- Postcode: 6230
Suburbs around Gelorup
Usher	College Grove	College Grove
Dalyellup	Gelorup	North Boyanup
Stratham	Stratham	Boyanup

Gelorup (pronounced gel-or-up) is a locality of the Shire of Capel in the South West region of Western Australia. The locality is immediately south of the City of Bunbury. Its western border is formed by the Bussell Highway.

The Shire of Capel and the locality of Gelorup are located on the traditional land of the Wardandi (also spelled Wadandi) people of the Noongar nation.

== Facilities ==
=== Education ===
The locality is home to the Bunbury Cathedral Grammar School, established in 1972.

=== Community ===
The locality has a multi-purpose community facility called the Gelorup Community Centre located on Haisties Road.

Gelorup has a number of parks and open spaces including Gelorup Skatepark, Michael Tichbon Park, Hampstead Park and 5 Mile Brook.
