= College Grove, Western Australia =

College Grove Bunbury, Western Australia
- Coordinates: 33°22′26″S 115°39′29″E
- Population: 1,821 (SAL 2021)
- Postcode(s): 6230
- Area: 5.7 km^{2} (2.2 sq mi)
- Location: 7 km (4 mi) SSE of Bunbury
- LGA(s): City of Bunbury
- State electorate(s): Bunbury
- Federal division(s): Forrest
Suburbs around College Grove:
Withers	Carey Park	Davenport
Usher	College Grove	Davenport
Dalyellup	Gelorup	Gelorup

College Grove is a suburb on the southern outskirts of Bunbury, Western Australia. Within the suburb there is the Bunbury Regional Hospital and St. John of God Bunbury Hospital on the South West Health Campus. The Edith Cowan University Bunbury Campus and South West Institute of Technology are also within College Grove.

Manea Park is a large natural reserve that offers a 2.2 km bush walk from College Grove and it was included as part of the Preston River to Ocean Regional Park in 2011. The bush walk is popular during Spring with over 30 species of orchid identified within the Park.

In the south-east of the suburb on the eastern side of Manea Park is the Bunbury Regional Prison.
