= St Patrick's Cathedral, Bunbury =

Cathedral in Bunbury, Western Australia

Coordinates: 33°19′44″S 115°38′14″E

St Patrick's Cathedral
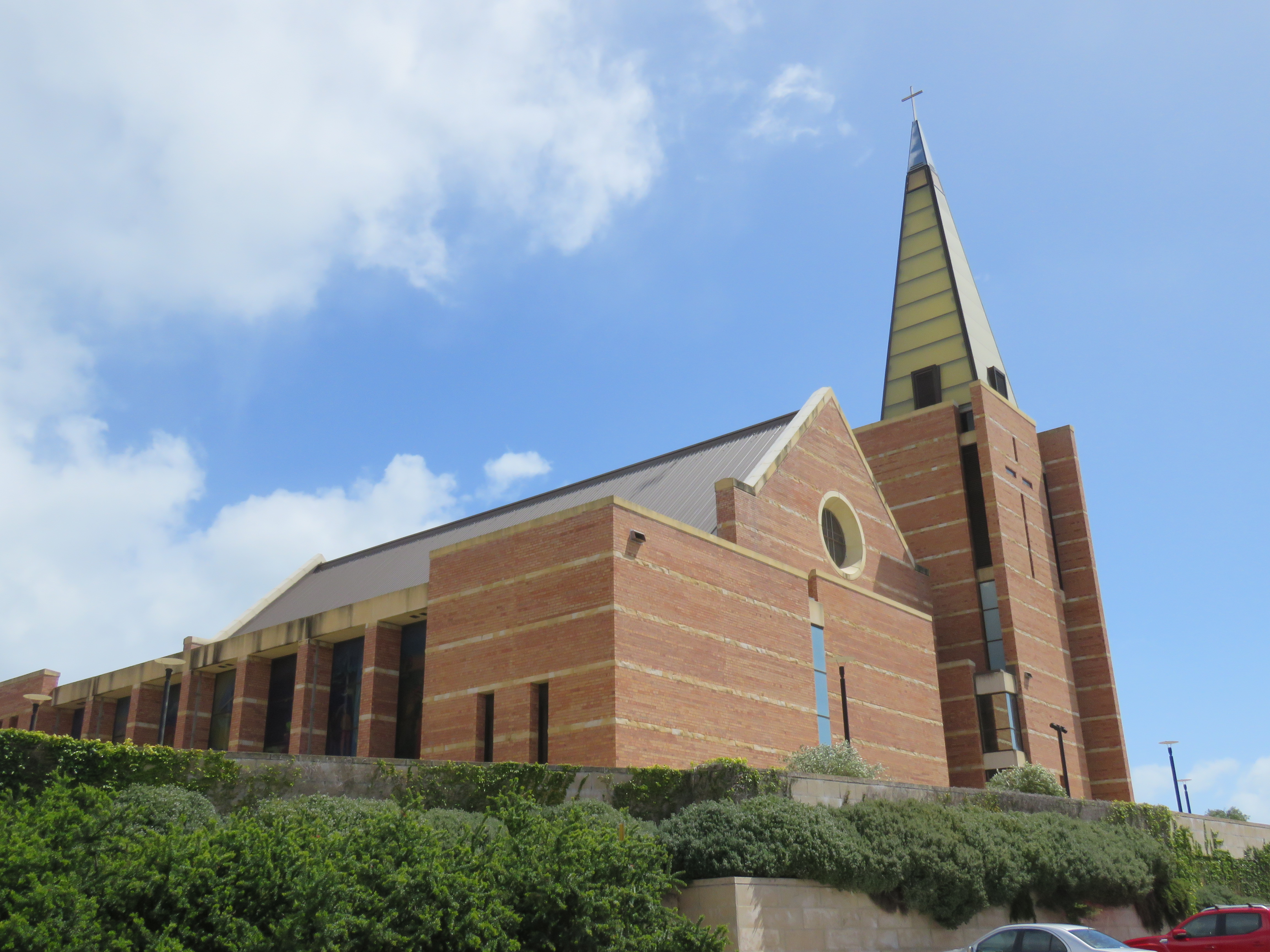
- View of the cathedral from the south-east
- St Patrick's Cathedral
- Location: Bunbury
- Country: Australia
- Denomination: Roman Catholic
- Website: bunburyparish.org

History
- Status: Church (1921 – 1954); Cathedral (1954 – present)
- Founded: 1919
- Dedication: Saint Patrick
- Dedicated: 1921; 17 March 2011
- Consecrated: 1954 (as a cathedral)

Architecture
- Demolished: 16 May 2005 (rebuilt)

Administration
- Diocese: Bunbury

Clergy
- Bishop: George Kołodziej

Western Australia Heritage Register
- Official name: Catholic Cathedral Precinct, Bunbury
- Type: State Registered Place
- Designated: 12 April 2019
- Reference no.: 345

St Patrick's Cathedral (also referred to as Bunbury Cathedral) is a religious building which is the main place of Catholic worship in the city of Bunbury, Western Australia, and is the seat of the Bishop of the Diocese of Bunbury.

The first stone was laid in 1919. The church was opened for worship two years later, as a parish church. In 1954 it was elevated to a cathedral by Pope Pius XII, when the Catholic Diocese of Bunbury was established.

On 16 May 2005, a tornado devastated the city, damaging the cathedral to the point of requiring demolition.

The new St. Patrick's Cathedral was built in five years and was dedicated on 17 March 2011, by Bishop Gerard Holohan.

== See also ==
- Roman Catholicism in Australia
- St. Patrick's Cathedral (disambiguation)
