= Bunbury Catholic College =

Location
- Bunbury, South West region, Western Australia; Australia; 33°20′34″S 115°39′42″E

Information
- Type: Catholic systemic co-educational high school
- Motto: To act justly, to love tenderly, and to walk humbly with your God (Micah 6:8)
- Religious affiliations: Catholic Diocese of Bunbury; Marist Brothers; Sisters of Mercy
- Denomination: Roman Catholicism
- Established: 1897; 129 years ago (as St Joseph's College); (Sisters of Mercy); 1954; 72 years ago (as St Francis Xavier’s College); (Marist Brothers); 1973; 53 years ago (as Bunbury Catholic College)
- Headmaster: Ben Priest
- Employees: c. 130
- Years: 7–12
- Enrolment: c. 945 (2023)
- Colours: Green, red and white
- Website: www.bunburycatholic.wa.edu.au

Bunbury Catholic College is a Catholic secondary school, located in Bunbury, in the South West region of Western Australia.

The college was formed in 1973 after the amalgamation of St Francis Xavier's College (operated by the Marist Brothers) and St Joseph's College (operated by the Sisters of Mercy) and provides a general and religious education for approximately 1,000 students from Year 7 to Year 12.

== History ==
In 1973 the Bishop of Bunbury mandated the administration of systemic Bunbury Catholic College to the Catholic Education Commission. The college developed from the amalgamation of St Francis Xavier College (Marist Brothers) and St Joseph's School (Mercy Sisters). The Commission fosters the continuous development and improvement of Catholic schools, acts on behalf of the Catholic community and determines major policy.

In 2015, a second campus was built in the nearby suburb of Australind; commonly known as the Mercy campus. The campus name is derived from the Sisters of Mercy, who co-founded the school. The Mercy Campus became independent in 2020, and split to form Our Lady of Mercy College.

== Notable alumni ==
- Pam Beggs - politician
- Alexandra Hagan – Olympic rower
- Lauren Reynolds – Olympic BMX cyclist
- Alex Saffy - Paralympic swimmer
- Wilson Tucker – politician

== See also ==
- List of schools in rural Western Australia
- Catholic education in Australia
