= City of Bunbury =

Local government area of Western Australia

Coordinates: 33°20′24″S 115°38′31″E

- Local government area
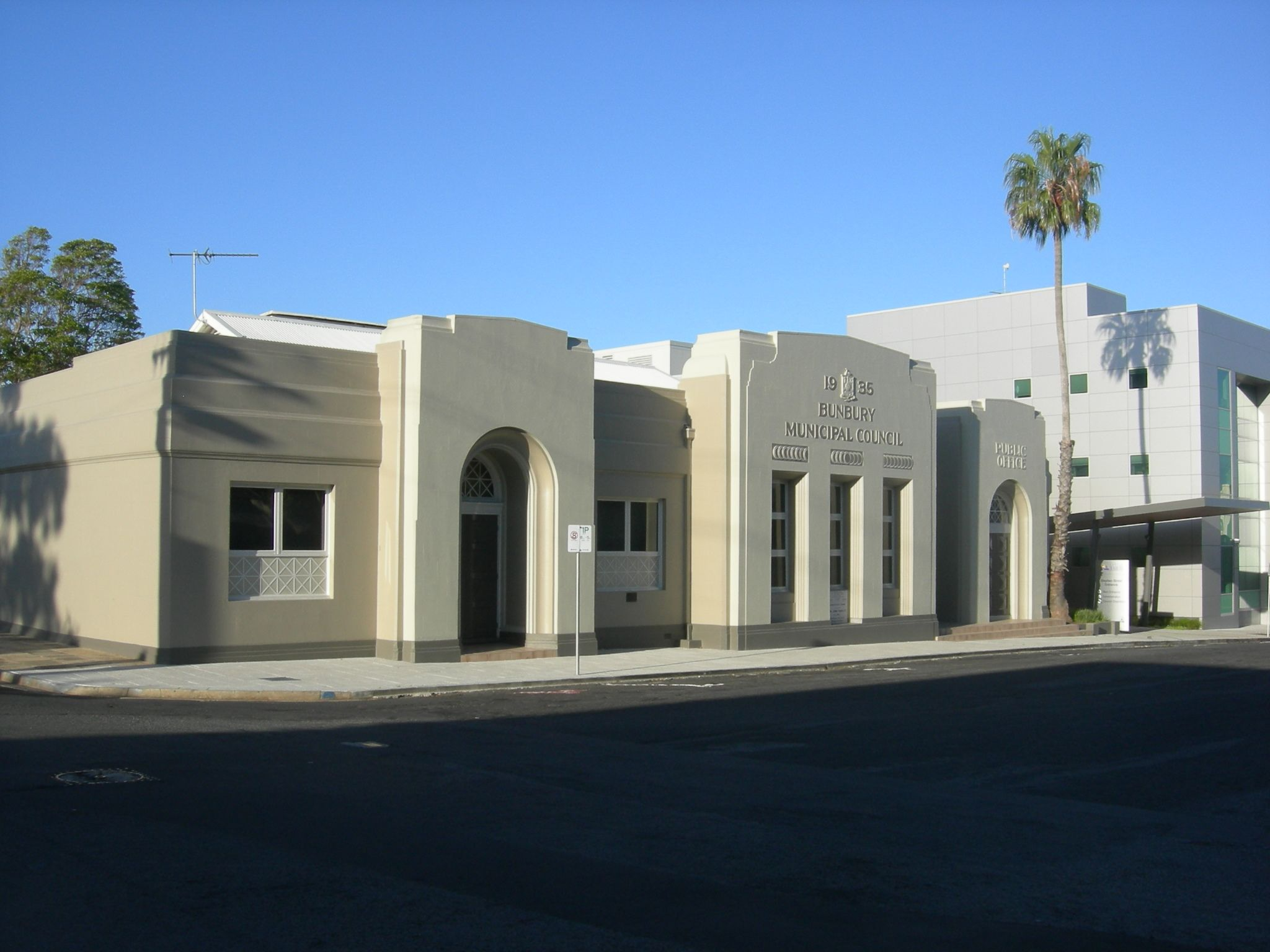
- The Council building in 2007

- Interactive map of City of Bunbury
- Country: Australia
- State: Western Australia
- Region: South West
- Established: 1871
- Council seat: Bunbury

Government
  - Mayor: Jaysen de San Miguel
  - State electorate: Bunbury
  - Federal division: Forrest

Area
  - Total: 65.7 km^{2} (25.4 sq mi)

Population
  - Total: 32,987 (LGA 2021)
- Website: City of Bunbury
LGAs around City of Bunbury
| | Harvey | Harvey |
| Indian Ocean | City of Bunbury | Dardanup |
| | Capel | Capel |

The City of Bunbury is a local government area in the South West region of Western Australia, covering an area of 65.7 square kilometres (25.4 sq mi) along the coast about 180 kilometres (112 mi) south of Perth, the capital of Western Australia. The City of Bunbury is one of four local governments comprising the Greater Bunbury urban area. As at the 2016 Census, the City of Bunbury had an estimated population of almost 32,000.

== History ==
The Municipality of Bunbury was established on 21 February 1871. It absorbed part of the abolished Bunbury Road District, which had surrounded the municipality, on 20 January 1950, leading to the formation of a new Suburban Ward. It gained town status on 1 July 1961, becoming the Town of Bunbury, and assumed its current name when it was granted city status on 8 October 1979.

== Indigenous people ==
The City of Bunbury is located on the traditional land of the Wardandi (also spelled Wadandi) people, of the Noongar nation.

== Wards ==
The town has 12 councillors and no wards. Each councillor serves a four-year term, and half-elections are held every two years. The mayor is directly elected.

== Twin towns and sister cities ==
The City of Bunbury has a sister/friendship city relationship with:

- (Japan) Setagaya, Tokyo, 1992
- (China) Jiaxing, Zhejiang, 2000
- (Vietnam) Nha Trang, Khánh Hòa, 2015

In 2009, Bunbury-Jiaxing Business Office was established to boost business opportunities between the two regions by assisting with communications and facilitating trade.

== Suburbs ==
The suburbs of the City of Bunbury with population and size figures based on the most recent Australian census:

| Locality | Population | Area | Map |
|---|---|---|---|
| Bunbury | 3,948 (SAL 2021) | 4.8 km^{2} (1.9 sq mi) | |
| Carey Park | 5,155 (SAL 2021) | 4.1 km^{2} (1.6 sq mi) | |
| College Grove | 1,821 (SAL 2021) | 5.7 km^{2} (2.2 sq mi) | |
| Davenport | 8 (SAL 2021) | 11.7 km^{2} (4.5 sq mi) | |
| East Bunbury | 4,019 (SAL 2021) | 3.5 km^{2} (1.4 sq mi) | |
| Glen Iris | 3,143 (SAL 2021) | 4.9 km^{2} (1.9 sq mi) | |
| Pelican Point | 929 (SAL 2021) | 2.4 km^{2} (0.93 sq mi) | |
| Picton | 31 (SAL 2021) | 6 km^{2} (2.3 sq mi) | |
| South Bunbury | 8,810 (SAL 2021) | 6.5 km^{2} (2.5 sq mi) | |
| Usher | 2,137 (SAL 2021) | 3.9 km^{2} (1.5 sq mi) | |
| Vittoria | 0 (SAL 2021) | 8.3 km^{2} (3.2 sq mi) | |
| Withers | 2,979 (SAL 2021) | 4.4 km^{2} (1.7 sq mi) | |

== Population ==
Historical population

| Year | Pop. | ±% p.a. |
|---|---|---|
| 1971 | 17,779 | — |
| 1976 | 19,513 | +1.88% |
| 1981 | 21,749 | +2.19% |
| 1986 | 23,031 | +1.15% |
| 1991 | 25,657 | +2.18% |
| 1996 | 26,490 | +0.64% |

| Year | Pop. | ±% p.a. |
|---|---|---|
| 2001 | 28,564 | +1.52% |
| 2006 | 29,336 | +0.53% |
| 2011 | 31,348 | +1.34% |
| 2016 | 31,919 | +0.36% |
| 2021 | 32,987 | +0.66% |

== Heritage-listed places ==
As of 2023, 358 places are heritage-listed in the City of Bunbury, of which 46 are on the State Register of Heritage Places, among them the Old Bunbury railway station, St Patrick's Cathedral, Bunbury Women's Club and the Rose Hotel.

== Gallery ==
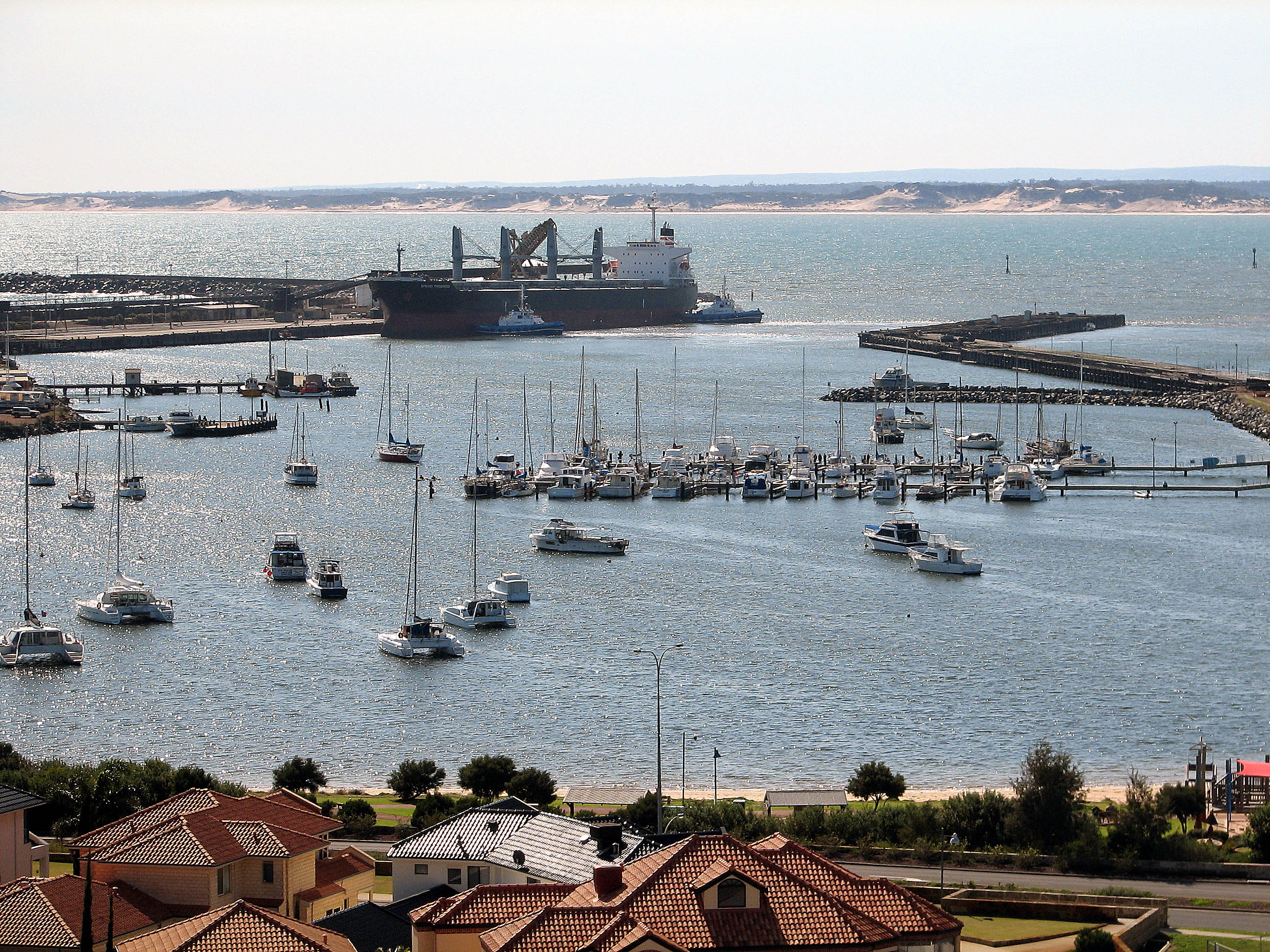
View west of the harbour from the lookout tower, August 2007

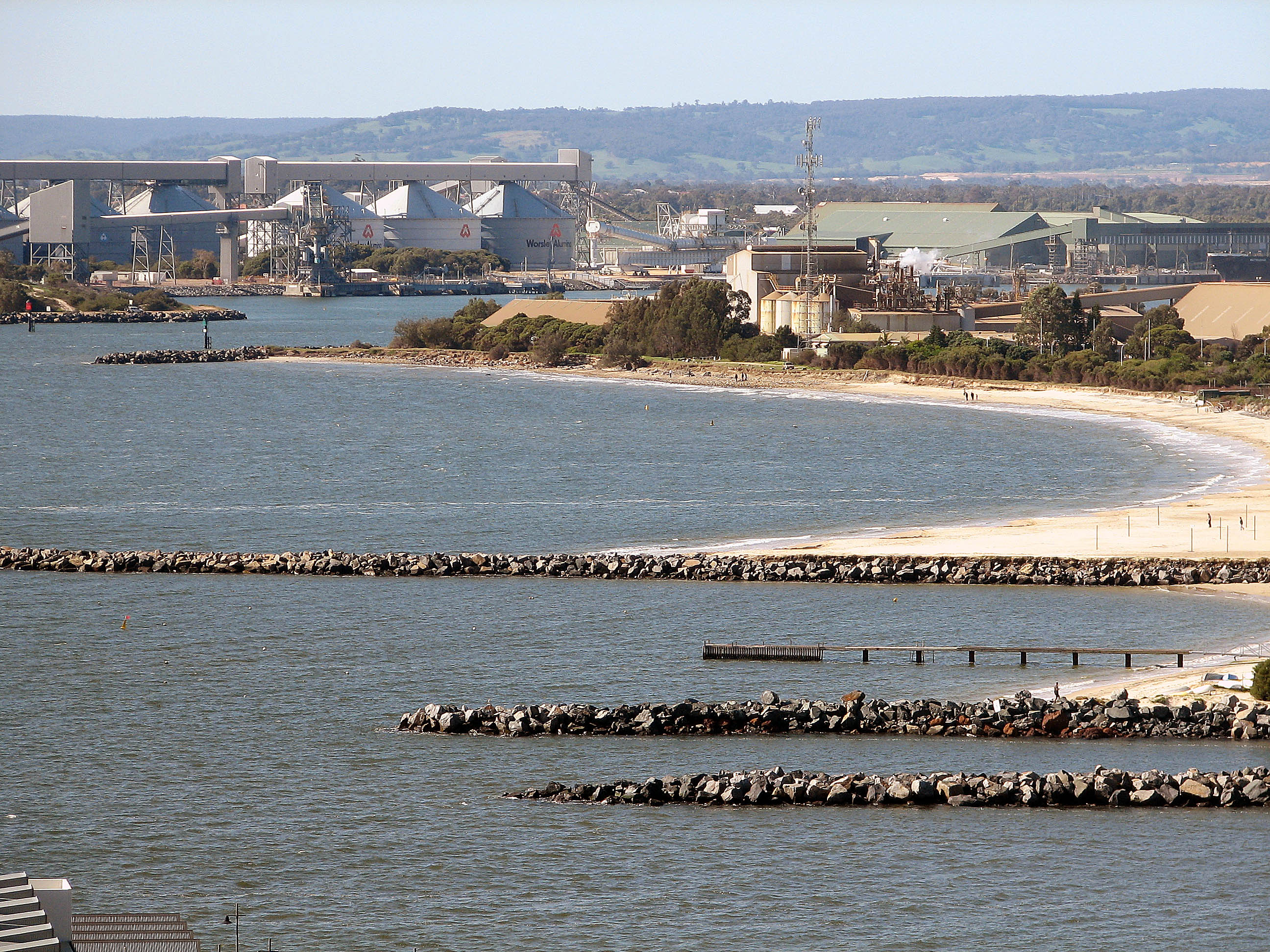
View north of the harbour from the lookout tower, August 2007

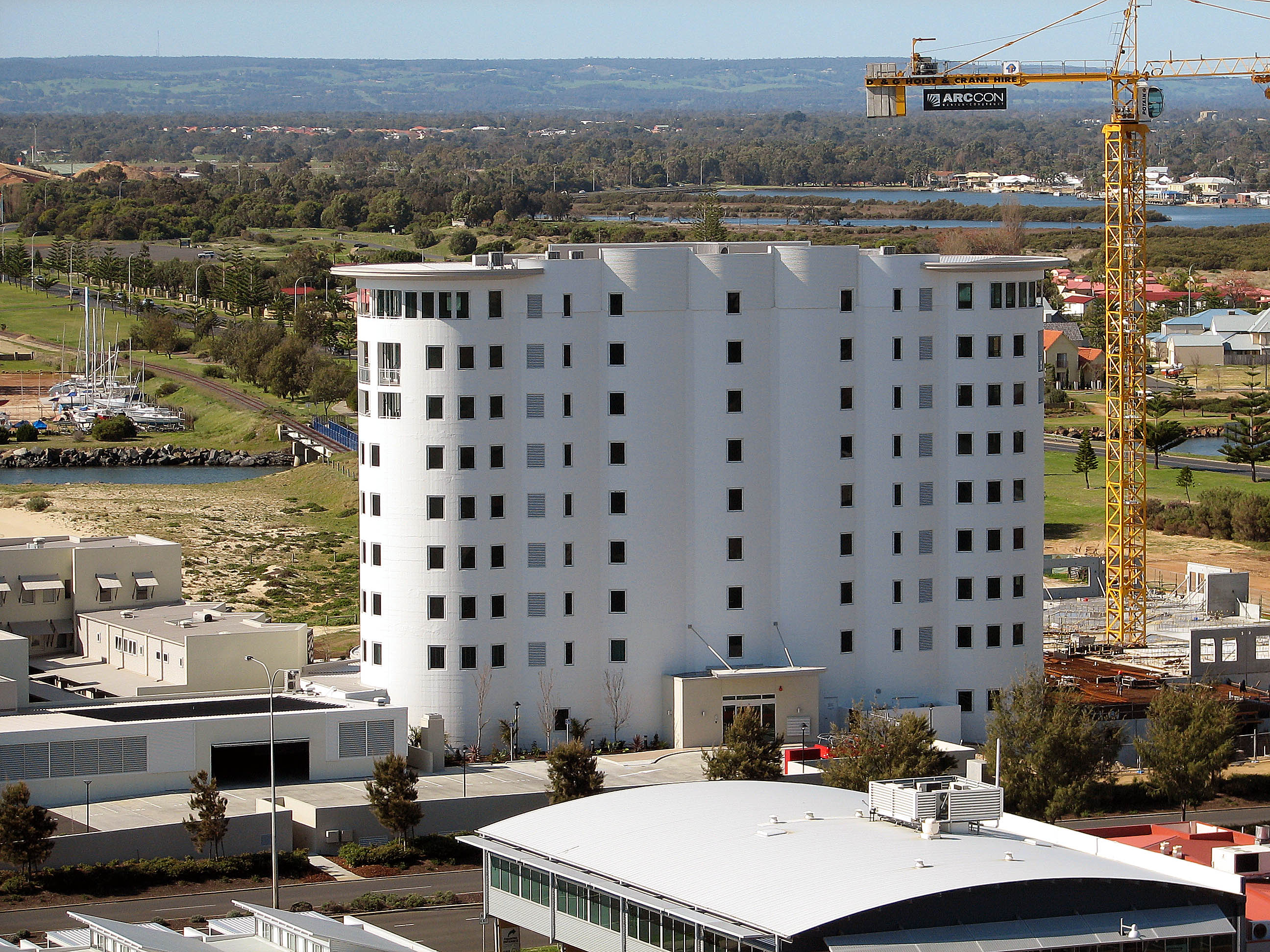
Wheat silos converted to residential apartments
