= Bunbury (suburb) =

Bunbury Bunbury, Western Australia
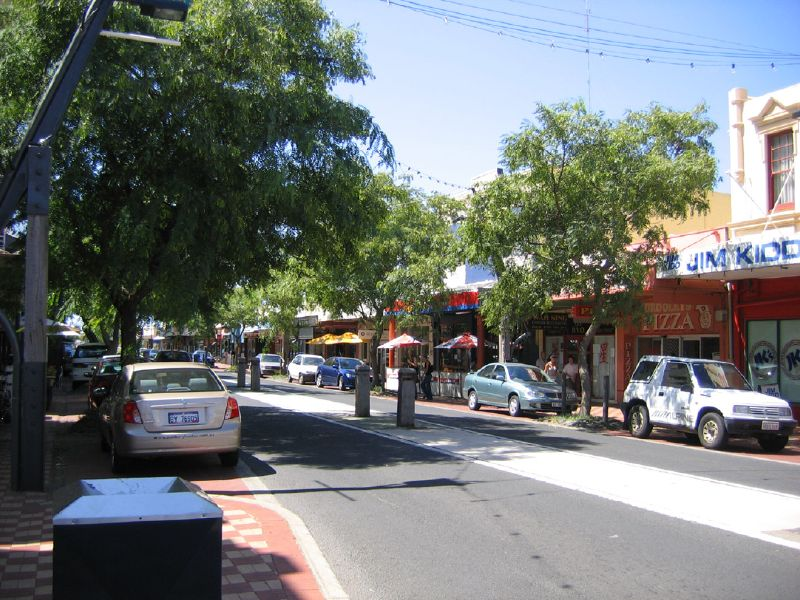
- Victoria Street

- Coordinates: 33°20′24″S 115°38′21.2″E
- Population: 3,948 (SAL 2021)
- Postcode(s): 6230
- Area: 4.8 km^{2} (1.9 sq mi)
- Location: 175 km (109 mi) SSW of Perth
- LGA(s): City of Bunbury
- State electorate(s): Bunbury
- Federal division(s): Forrest
Suburbs around Bunbury:
Indian Ocean
	Bunbury	Vittoria
South Bunbury	South Bunbury	East Bunbury

Bunbury is a suburb of the Western Australian city of Bunbury, and includes the city's central business district (CBD). The CBD is located primarily on Victoria Street. Blair Street is the major road linking the southern and eastern suburbs of Bunbury to the CBD, and has a large number of businesses and retail outlets situated along it.

== Features ==
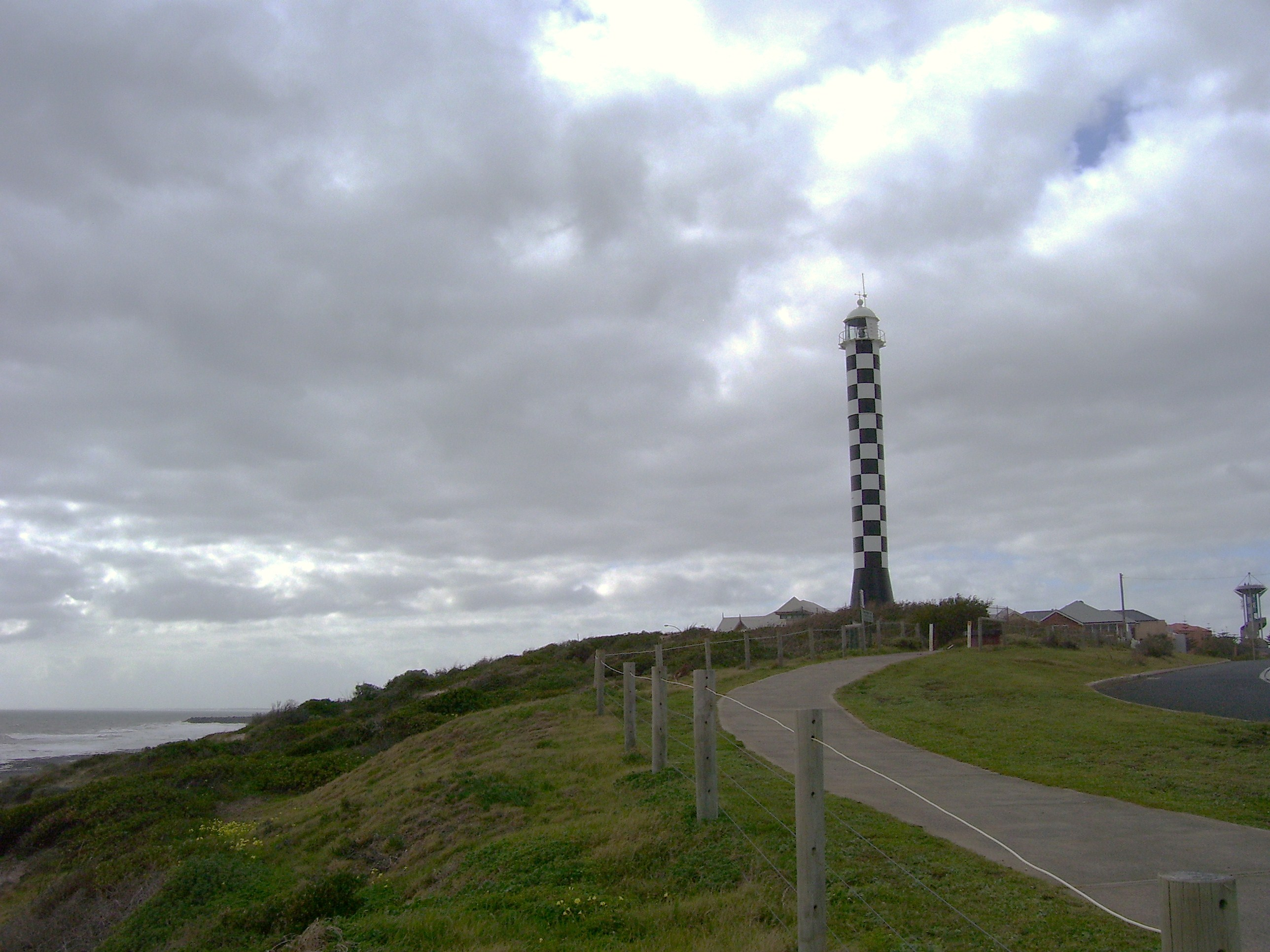
Bunbury's lighthouse and Marlston Hill's lookout tower

- Bunbury Tower, a landmark high-rise building, was one of the first achievements of the South West Development Commission and represents efforts to decentralise government activities and provide local employment opportunities. The Tower is colloquially referred to as the "Milk Carton" for its distinctive shape and blue-and-white colours.
- The old lighthouse and lookout tower in the Marlston Hill district, which has been a focus of the city's cultural and commercial growth since the late 1990s.
