= Roman Catholic Diocese of Bunbury =

Latin Catholic diocese in Australia

Diocese of Bunbury Dioecesis Bumburiensis

Location
- Country: Australia
- Territory: South West and Great Southern, Western Australia
- Ecclesiastical province: Perth
- Coordinates: 33°19′46″S 115°38′13″E

Statistics
- Area: 184,000 km^{2} (71,000 sq mi)
- Population: Total; Catholics: (as of 2012); 283,000; 58,522 (20.7%)
- Parishes: 27

Information
- Denomination: Catholic Church
- Sui iuris church: Latin Church
- Rite: Roman Rite
- Established: 12 November 1954
- Cathedral: St Patrick's Cathedral

Current leadership
- Pope: Leo XIV
- Bishop: George Kołodziej
- Bishops emeritus: Gerard Holohan

Website
- Catholic Diocese of Bunbury

The Diocese of Bunbury is a Latin Church ecclesiastical jurisdiction or diocese of the Catholic Church in Australia. It is a suffragan in the ecclesiastical province of the metropolitan Archdiocese of Perth. The diocese covers the South West and Great Southern regions of Western Australia.

== History ==
The Diocese of Bunbury was established in 12 November 1954 by Pope Pius XII, taking land from an area previously administered by the Archdiocese of Perth. Bishop Launcelot John Goody was appointed the first bishop of the new diocese. Bishop Goody served the Diocese of Bunbury for 14 years, before being appointed Archbishop of Perth in 1968.

== Ordinaries ==
The following men have been Bishop of Bunbury:

Order	Name	Date enthroned	Reign ended	Term of office	Reason for term end
1	Lancelot Goody †	12 November 1954	18 October 1968	13 years, 341 days	Elevated as Archbishop of Perth
2	Myles McKeon †	6 March 1969	18 February 1982	12 years, 349 days	Resigned and appointed Bishop Emeritus of Bunbury
3	Peter Quinn †	26 May 1982	20 December 2000	18 years, 208 days	Resigned and appointed Bishop Emeritus of Bunbury
4	Gerard Joseph Holohan	5 September 2001	30 June 2023	21 years, 298 days	Resigned and appointed Bishop Emeritus of Bunbury
5	George Kołodziej SDS	20 March 2025	Incumbent	259 days	

== Parishes ==
The diocese is divided into three separate deaneries that administer individual parishes:

1. Great Southern deanery with regular liturgical services held in the parishes of Albany (St Joseph), Denmark (St Mary), Esperance (Star of the Sea), Katanning (St Patrick), Kojonup (St Bernard), Lake Grace (Maria Regina), Mount Barker (Sacred Heart), Narrogin (St Matthew), and Wagin (St Joseph)
2. Lower South West deanery with regular liturgical services held in the parishes of Boyup Brook (St Mary), Bridgetown (St Brigid), Busselton (St Joseph and Our Lady of the Bay), Donnybrook (St Mary), Dunsborough (Our Lady of the Southern Cross), Manjimup (St Joseph), Margaret River (St Thomas More), and Pemberton (Sacred Heart)
3. South West deanery with regular liturgical services held in the parishes of Bunbury (Cathedral Parish of St Patrick), Brunswick Junction (Our Lady's Assumption), Collie (St Brigid), Dardanup (The Immaculate Conception), Dawesville (St Damien), Harvey (Our Lady of Immaculate Conception), Australind (Church of the Living Vine), Mandurah (Our Lady's Assumption), Pinjarra (St Augustine), and Waroona (St Patrick)

== Controversy ==
In 2003 Adrian Richard Van Klooster, a Catholic priest, pleaded guilty to four counts of indecently dealing with children under the age of 13 and was found with child pornography on his computer.

== See also ==
- Catholic Church in Australia
