= List of State Register of Heritage Places in the Shire of Moora =

List of heritage sites in Western Australia

The State Register of Heritage Places is maintained by the Heritage Council of Western Australia. As of 2026, 229 places are heritage-listed in the Shire of Moora, of which five are on the State Register of Heritage Places.

== List ==
The Western Australian State Register of Heritage Places, as of 2026, lists the following five state registered places within the Shire of Moora:

Place name	Place #	Street number	Street name	Suburb or town	Co-ordinates	Notes & former names	Photo
St James' Anglican Church, Moora	1594		Church & Robert Street	Moora	30.642033°S 116.006728°E		
St John The Baptist Church (R.C.)	1598	Lot 92	Kintore Street	Moora	30.64076°S 116.002623°E		
Moora Town Hall	1599		Padbury Street	Moora	30.64177°S 116.00765°E	Moora Roads Board office (former), Moora Roll of Honour	
Moora Post Office & Quarters	1601	Corner	Padbury & Dandaragan Street	Moora	30.638839°S 116.00726°E		
Walebing	3268	14798	Great Northern Highway	Walebing	30.692327°S 116.213957°E	Walebing Farm Buildings	
