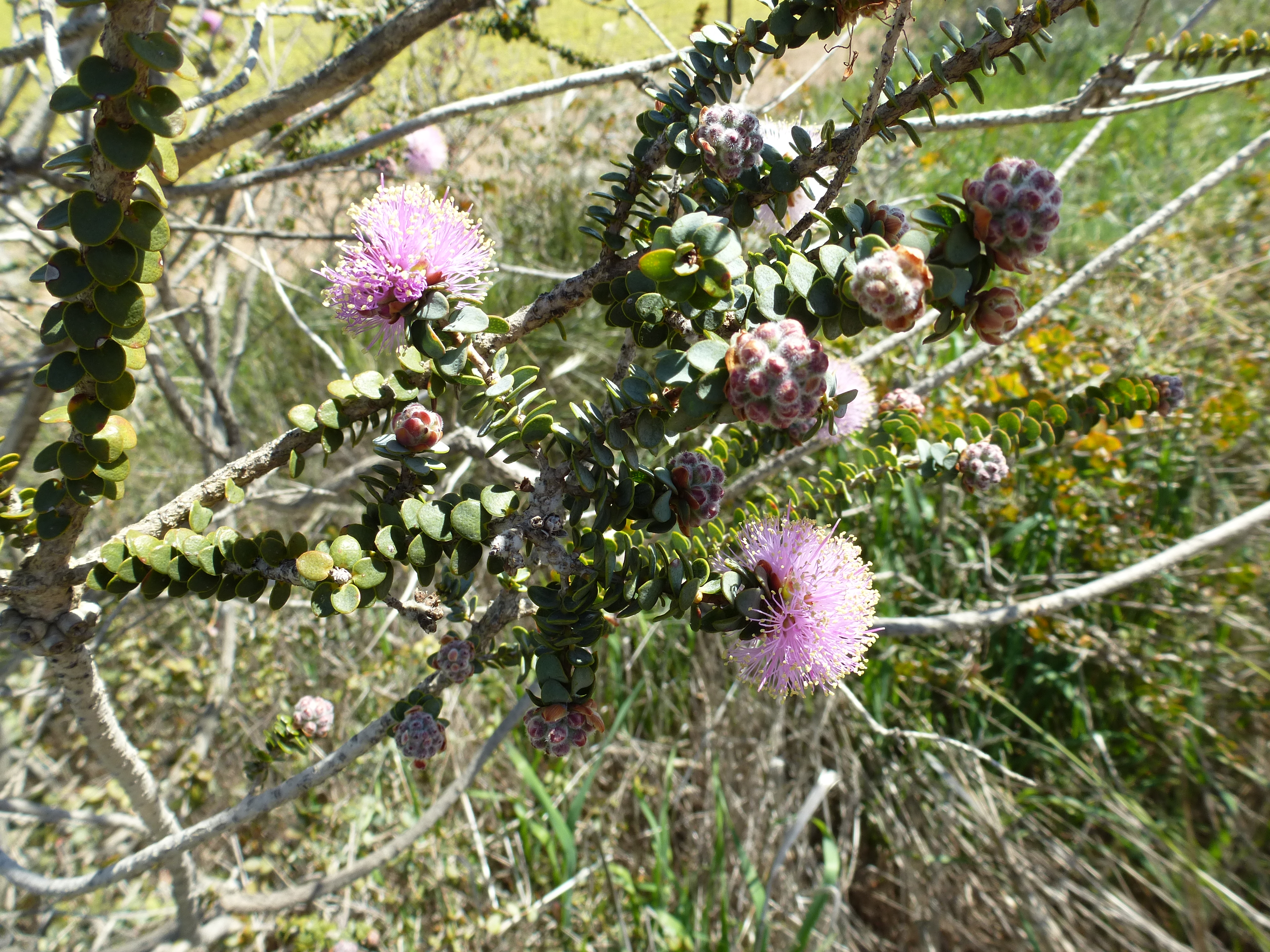

Scientific classification
- Kingdom: Plantae
- Clade: Tracheophytes
- Clade: Angiosperms
- Clade: Eudicots
- Clade: Rosids
- Order: Myrtales
- Family: Myrtaceae
- Genus: Melaleuca
- Species: M. orbicularis

Binomial name
- Melaleuca orbicularis Craven

= Melaleuca orbicularis =

Species of flowering plant

Melaleuca orbicularis is a plant in the myrtle family, Myrtaceae and is endemic to the south-west of Western Australia. It is similar to Melaleuca cordata with its pinkish "pom-pom" heads of flowers but its leaves are smaller, almost circular compared to the heart shaped leaves of the other species.

== Description ==
Melaleuca orbicularis is an erect shrub growing to 2.5 m (8 ft) tall. Its leaves are arranged alternately and are 3.5–8 mm (0.1–0.3 in) long, 2–10.5 mm (0.08–0.4 in) wide, heart-shaped to almost circular.

The flowers are a shade of pink to purple and are arranged in heads on the ends of branches which continue to grow after flowering and sometimes also in the upper leaf axils. The heads are up to 30 mm (1 in) in diameter with 2 to 8 groups of flowers in threes. The petals are 2–3 mm (0.08–0.1 in) long and fall off soon after the flower opens. The outer surface of the floral cup (the hypanthium) is hairy and there are five bundles of stamens around the flower, each with 5 to 12 stamens. Flowering occurs from July to January and is followed by fruit which are woody capsules, 3–5 mm (0.1–0.2 in) long, usually in tight, oval-shaped clusters along the stem.

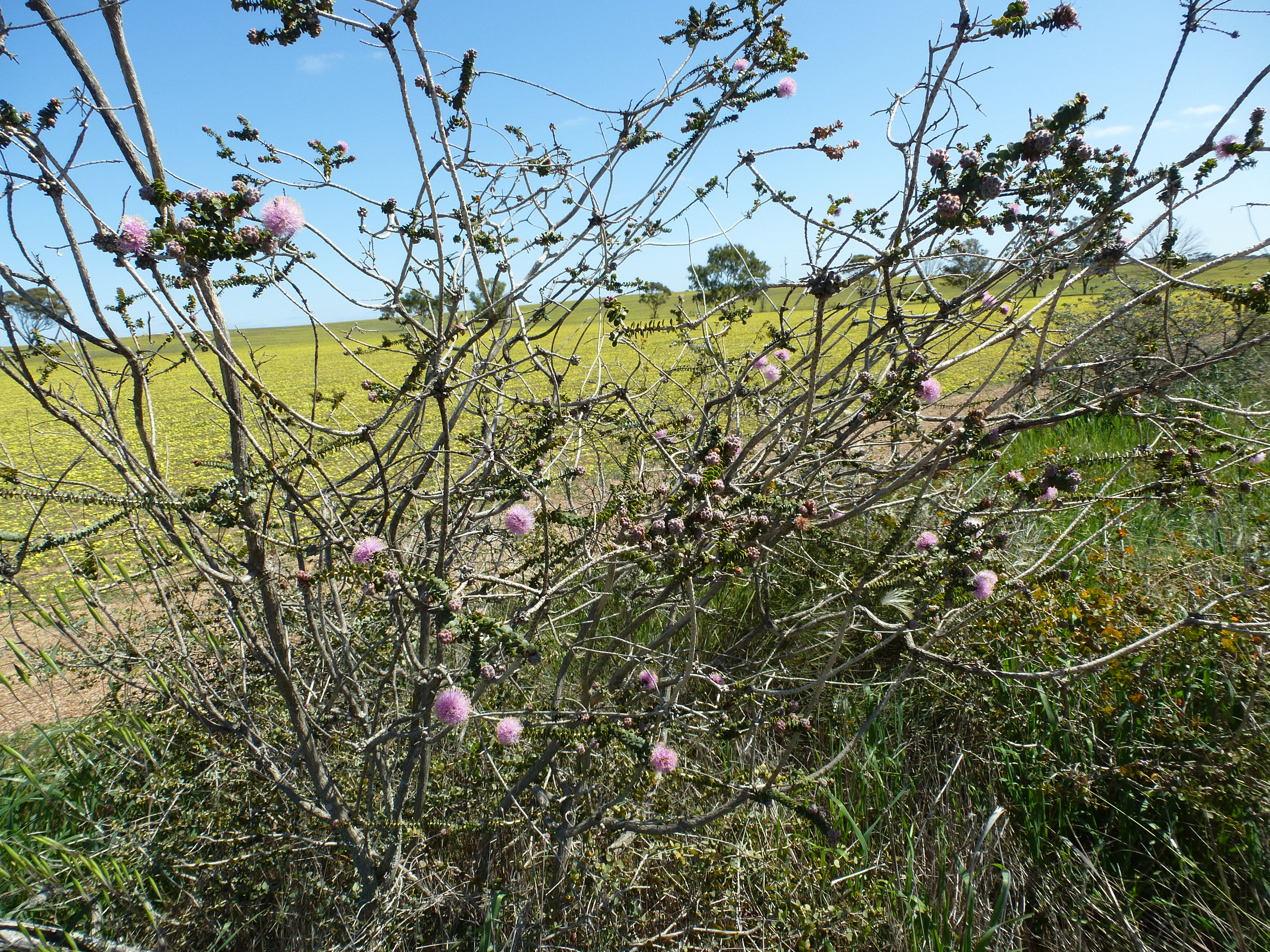
Habit near Bindi Bindi

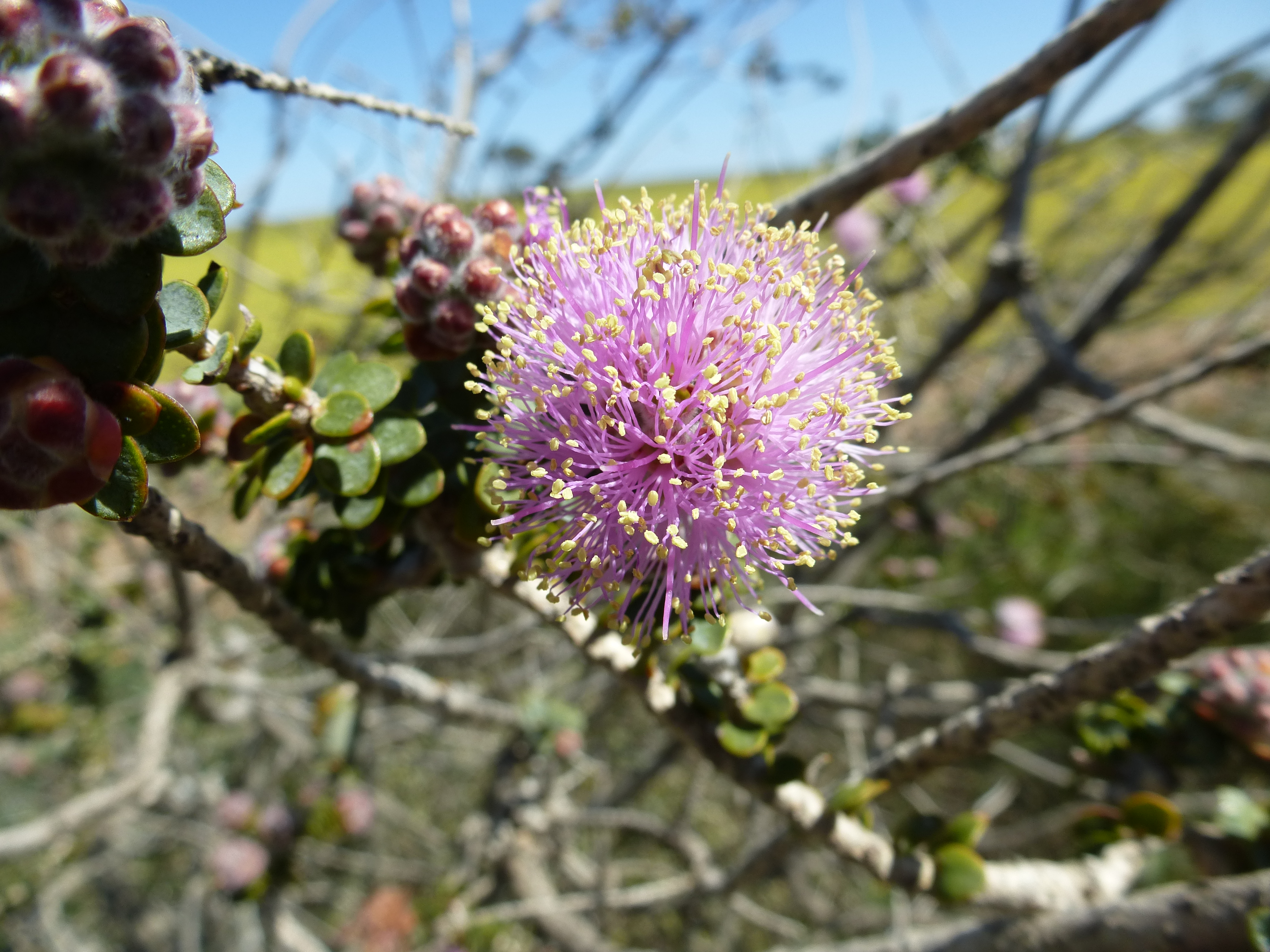
Flower detail

== Taxonomy and naming ==
Melaleuca orbicularis was first formally described in 1999 by Lyndley Craven in Australian Systematic Botany from a specimen collected near Bindi Bindi. The specific epithet (orbicularis) is a Latin word meaning "circular" referring to the circular leaves.

== Distribution and habitat ==
Melaleuca orbicularis occurs in and between the Coorong, Wongan Hills and Cowcowing districts in the Avon Wheatbelt, Geraldton Sandplains, Jarrah Forest and Warren biogeographic regions. It grows in a range of vegetation associations in sand over sandstone and laterite.

== Conservation ==
Melaleuca orbicularis is listed as not threatened by the Government of Western Australia Department of Parks and Wildlife.
