= List of State Register of Heritage Places in the Shire of Cuballing =

List of heritage sites in Western Australia

The State Register of Heritage Places is maintained by the Heritage Council of Western Australia. As of 2026, 28 places are heritage-listed in the Shire of Cuballing, of which three are on the State Register of Heritage Places.

== List ==
The Western Australian State Register of Heritage Places, as of 2026, lists the following three state registered places within the Shire of Cuballing:

Place name	Place #	Street number	Street name	Suburb or town	Co-ordinates	Notes & former names	Photo
Cuballing Post Office & Quarters (former)	617	195	Campbell Street	Cuballing	32.81872°S 117.178184°E		
Dryandra Woodland Settlement	618		Dryandra Road via Congelin	Cuballing	32.78285°S 116.969822°E	Currawong Complex Nissen Huts, Lions Dryandra Forest Village	
Cuballing Civic Group	3856	Lots 113 & 368	Campbell Street	Cuballing	32.818869°S 117.177634°E	CWA Hall, Shire Offices (former), Road Board Office (former) & Agricultural Hall	
