= CBH Group 200 Class =

Locomotive

- CBH216 leading a loaded grain train from Wyalkatchem, passing Berring Bank.
Type and origin
- Power type: Diesel-electric
- Builder: Wabtec Corporation, Contagem, Minas Gerais, Brazil
- Model: CM20ACi
- Build date: September 2025 – present
- Total produced: 17
Specifications
- Configuration
  - AAR: C-C
  - UIC: Co′Co′
- Gauge: 3 ft 6 in (1,067 mm) Cape gauge
- Bogies: UGL FlexiCurve
- Fuel type: Diesel
- Prime mover: GE 7FDL-8
- RPM range: 300-1,050
- Engine type: V8 diesel engine
- Aspiration: Turbocharged
- Cylinders: 8
Performance figures
- Power output: 2,000 hp (1,500 kW)
Career
- Operators: Aurizon
- Number in class: 17
- Numbers: 201–217
- Nicknames: Brazil Nuts, Dogbones, Embraers, Gap Tooth, Minions, Overbite, Thumpers
- Locale: Western Australia
- First run: 12 April 2026
- Current owner: CBH Group
- Disposition: 15 in service, 2 undergoing commissioning

The 200 Class is a six-axle, 2,000 hp class of diesel-electric locomotive built by Wabtec in Contagem, Minas Gerais, Brazil for CBH Group, Western Australia's grain growing co-operative. Seventeen have been ordered in June 2023 as part of their Path to 2033 strategy, with the first three units (202, 203 & 204) arriving in January 2026 and started conducting operational/acceptance trials three months later. At the same time the next batch of seven locomotives arrived (201, 205, 206, 207, 208, 210, 211). On the 18th June, the final batch of seven (209, 212, 213, 214, 215, 216 & 217) arrived.

The official launch for these locomotives (and new CGHY and CGKY grain hopper wagons) was held on the 14th August, 2026 at the CBH Metro Grain Centre in Forrestfield, with locomotive 209 (entering service the same day) pulling the ceremonial train.

== Class list ==
Serial number	Build date	Loco number	Name	In service	Notes
TBD	TBD	201	Pindar	TBD	
TBD	TBD	202	Bindi Bindi	12 April 2026	
TBD	TBD	203	Woodanilling	12 April 2026	
TBD	TBD	204	Mawson	12 April 2026	
CT251002008	December 2025	205	Badgebup	14 July 2026	
TBD	TBD	206	Sullivan	10 July 2026	
CT251002010	TBD	207	Maya	24 July 2026	
CT251102011	January 2026	208	Bowgada	17 June 2026	
CT251102012	February 2026	209	Tarin Rock	14 August 2026	
CT251102013	February 2026	210	Welbungin	28 May 2026	
CT251202014	January 2026	211	Yornaning	27 June 2026	
TBD	TBD	212	Bullaring	26 August 2026	
CT251202016	January 2026	213	Karlgarin	8 September 2026	
CT251002017	January 2026	214	Tambellup	23 September 2026	
CT251002018	March 2026	215	Kuender	23 September 2026	
CT261002019	March 2026	216	Minnivale	25 October 2026	
TBD	TBD	217	Popanyinning	TBD	
