= Leioproctus calvus =

Scientific classification
- Kingdom: Animalia
- Phylum: Arthropoda
- Clade: Pancrustacea
- Class: Insecta
- Order: Hymenoptera
- Family: Colletidae
- Genus: Leioproctus
- Species: L. calvus

Binomial name
- Leioproctus calvus Batley, 2025

Species of bee

Leioproctus calvus, or Leioproctus (Euryglossidia) calvus, is a species of bee in the family Colletidae and subfamily Colletinae. It is endemic to Australia. It was described by entomologist Michael Batley in 2025.

== Etymology ==
The specific epithet calvus (Latin: "bald") refers to the relative hairlessness of the sternal plates on the metasoma.

== Description ==
The male body length is 7.5 mm. Integumental colouration is mainly black with a brassy sheen, and brown. The hair is mostly white.

== Distribution and habitat ==
The species occurs in south-west Western Australia. The type locality is Cranmore Park, near Bindi Bindi, in the Wheatbelt region.

== Behaviour ==
The adults are flying mellivores.
