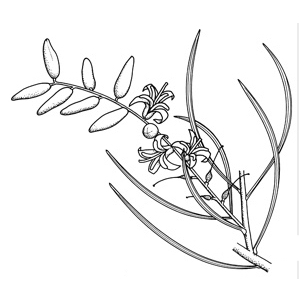

Conservation status
- Priority Three — Poorly Known Taxa (DEC)

Scientific classification
- Kingdom: Plantae
- Clade: Tracheophytes
- Clade: Angiosperms
- Clade: Eudicots
- Order: Proteales
- Family: Proteaceae
- Genus: Persoonia
- Species: P. chapmaniana

Binomial name
- Persoonia chapmaniana P.H.Weston
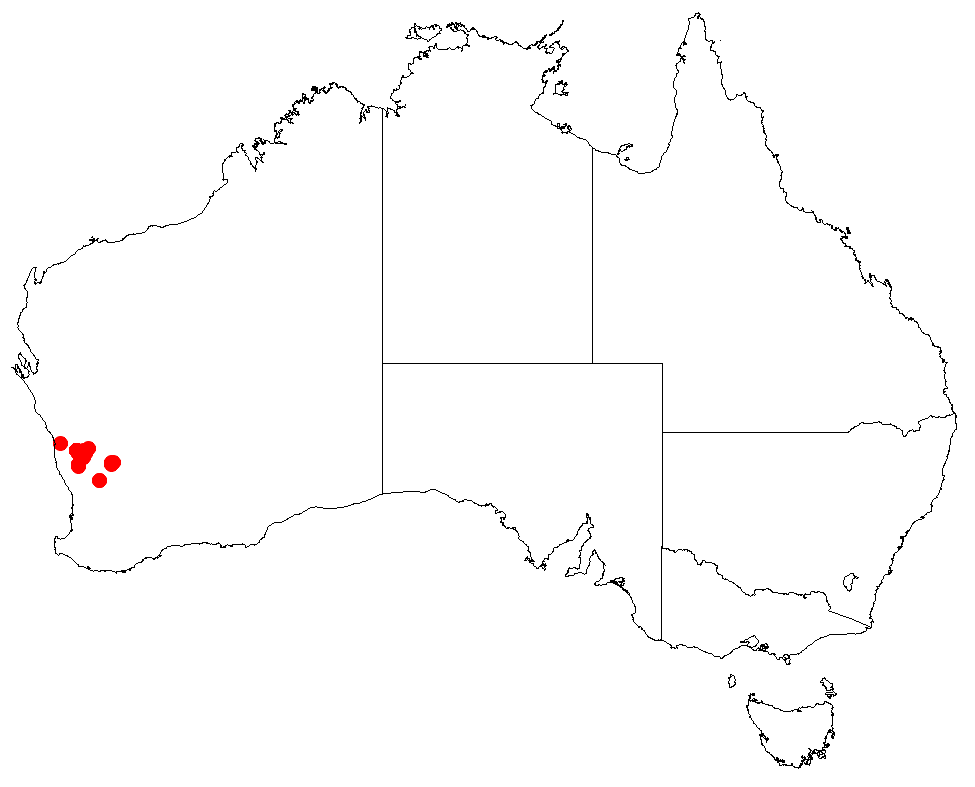
- Occurrence data downloaded from AVH

= Persoonia chapmaniana =

Species of flowering plant

Persoonia chapmaniana is a species of flowering plant in the family Proteaceae and is endemic to the south-west of Western Australia. It is an erect, spreading shrub with smooth, compact bark, linear leaves with a sharp point on the tip and yellow flowers borne in groups of five to thirty along a rachis up to 60 mm (2.4 in) long.

== Description ==
Persoonia chapmaniana is an erect, spreading shrub that typically grows to a height of 1–2 m (3 ft 3 in – 6 ft 7 in) with smooth, mottled grey bark and densely hairy branchlets. The leaves are linear, 20–80 mm (0.79–3.15 in) long and 0.9–1.3 mm (0.035–0.051 in) wide with a sharply-pointed tip. The flowers are arranged along a rachis 15–60 mm (0.59–2.36 in) long, each flower on a pedicel up to 5 mm (0.20 in) long. The tepals are yellow, 5.5–11.5 mm (0.22–0.45 in) long and glabrous on the outside. Flowering occurs from September to November and the fruit is a warty drupe 7.5–12 mm (0.30–0.47 in) long and 4–5 mm (0.16–0.20 in) wide.

== Taxonomy and naming ==
Persoonia chapmaniana was first formally described in 1994 by Peter Weston in the journal Telopea from specimens collected by Charles Chapman of Coorow, near the road between Carnamah and Eneabba in 1981. The specific epithet (chapmaniana) honours the collector of the type specimens.

== Distribution and habitat ==
This geebung grows in woodland near salt lakes between the type location, Coomberdale, Lake Ninan (near Wongan Hills) and Kulja in the Avon Wheatbelt, Geraldton Sandplains and Swan Coastal Plain biogeographic regions.

== Conservation status ==
Persoonia chapmaniana is classified as "Priority Three" by the Government of Western Australia Department of Parks and Wildlife meaning that it is poorly known and known from only a few locations but is not under imminent threat.
