= Grevillea pinifolia =

Conservation status
- Priority One — Poorly Known Taxa (DEC)

Scientific classification
- Kingdom: Plantae
- Clade: Tracheophytes
- Clade: Angiosperms
- Clade: Eudicots
- Order: Proteales
- Family: Proteaceae
- Genus: Grevillea
- Species: G. pinifolia

Binomial name
- Grevillea pinifolia Meisn.

Species of shrub endemic to Western Australia

Grevillea pinifolia, commonly known as the pine-leaved grevillea, is a species of flowering plant in the family Proteaceae and is endemic to a restricted area in the south-west of Western Australia. It is a low, mounded shrub with linear, more or less cylindrical leaves and red to orange-red flowers.

== Description ==
Greville pinifolia is a low, mounded shrub that typically grows to a height of 30–60 cm (12–24 in) and has many branches. Its leaves are linear, more or less cylindrical, 25–50 mm (0.98–1.97 in) long and 0.5–0.7 mm (0.020–0.028 in) wide. The edges of the leaves are rolled under to the mid-vein with two longitudinal grooves either side. The flowers are arranged singly or in groups of up to 4 in leaf axils, on a woolly-hairy rachis 0.5–1 mm (0.020–0.039 in) long and are red to orange-red and shaggy- to silky-hairy, the pistil 7.5–8.5 mm (0.30–0.33 in) long. Flowering occurs from July to October and the fruit is an oval follicle about 10 mm (0.39 in) long.

== Taxonomy ==
Grevillea pinifolia was first formally described in 1856 by Carl Meissner in de Candolle's Prodromus Systematis Naturalis Regni Vegetabilis from specimens collected in the Swan River Colony by James Drummond. The specific epithet (pinifolia) means "pine-leaved".

== Distribution and habitat ==
Pine-leaved grevillea grows in shrubland and is restricted to a small area between Eneabba and Bindi Bindi in the Avon Wheatbelt bioregion of south-western Western Australia.

== Conservation status ==
This grevillea is listed as "Priority One" by the Government of Western Australia Department of Biodiversity, Conservation and Attractions, meaning that it is known from only one or a few locations which are potentially at risk.

== See also ==
- List of Grevillea species
