= Acacia costata =

Scientific classification
- Kingdom: Plantae
- Clade: Tracheophytes
- Clade: Angiosperms
- Clade: Eudicots
- Clade: Rosids
- Order: Fabales
- Family: Fabaceae
- Subfamily: Caesalpinioideae
- Clade: Mimosoid clade
- Genus: Acacia
- Species: A. costata

Binomial name
- Acacia costata Benth.
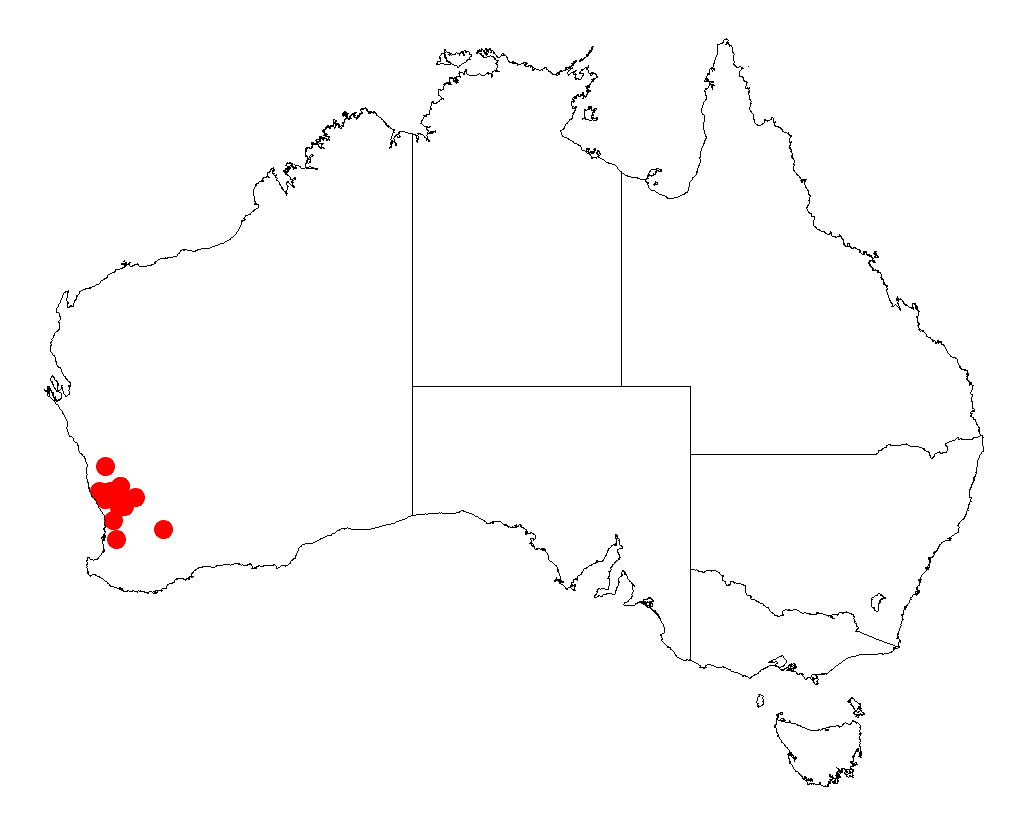
- Occurrence data from AVH

Synonyms
- Racosperma costatum (Benth.) Pedley

Species of legume

Acacia costata is a species of flowering plant in the family Fabaceae and is endemic to the south-west of Western Australia. It is a spreading shrub with more or less sessile, narrowly lance-shaped, straight or slightly curved, sharply pointed phyllodes, spherical heads of golden yellow flowers and terete, dark reddish brown pods.

== Description ==
Acacia costata is a spreading shrub that typically grows to a height of 20–50 cm (7.9–19.7 in) and has ribbed, woolly hairy branchlets that become glabrous as they age. Its phyllodes are more or less sessile, narrowly lance-shaped, straight or slightly curved, 6–15 mm (0.24–0.59 in) long and 1.5–2.5 mm (0.059–0.098 in) wide and sharply pointed with five main veins and a prominent midrib. The flowers are borne in a spherical head in axils on a peduncle 5–12 mm (0.20–0.47 in) long, each head with 13 to 19 loosely arranged golden yellow flowers. Flowering occurs from May to June, and the pods are curved, terete, dark reddish brown and up to 50 mm (2.0 in) long and 4.0–4.5 mm (0.16–0.18 in) wide. The seeds are about 5 mm (0.20 in) long with a conical aril in the end.

== Taxonomy ==
Acacia costata was first formally described in 1842 by George Bentham in Hooker's London Journal of Botany from specimens collected near the Swan River Colony by James Drummond. The specific epithet (costata) means 'ribbed', referring to the stems.

== Distribution and habitat ==
This species of wattle is native to an area along the west coast between Walebing, Calingiri and Cataby, with an earlier collection from near Perth, in the Avon Wheatbelt, Geraldton Sandplains, Jarrah Forest and Swan Coastal Plain bioregions of south-western Western Australia. It is usually found on lateritic ridges and sandplains growing in sandy or gravelly soils.

== Conservation status ==
Acacia costata is listed as "not threatened" by the Government of Western Australia Department of Biodiversity, Conservation and Attractions.

== See also ==
- List of Acacia species
