= Leucopogon darlingensis =

Scientific classification
- Kingdom: Plantae
- Clade: Tracheophytes
- Clade: Angiosperms
- Clade: Eudicots
- Clade: Asterids
- Order: Ericales
- Family: Ericaceae
- Genus: Leucopogon
- Species: L. darlingensis

Binomial name
- Leucopogon darlingensis Hislop
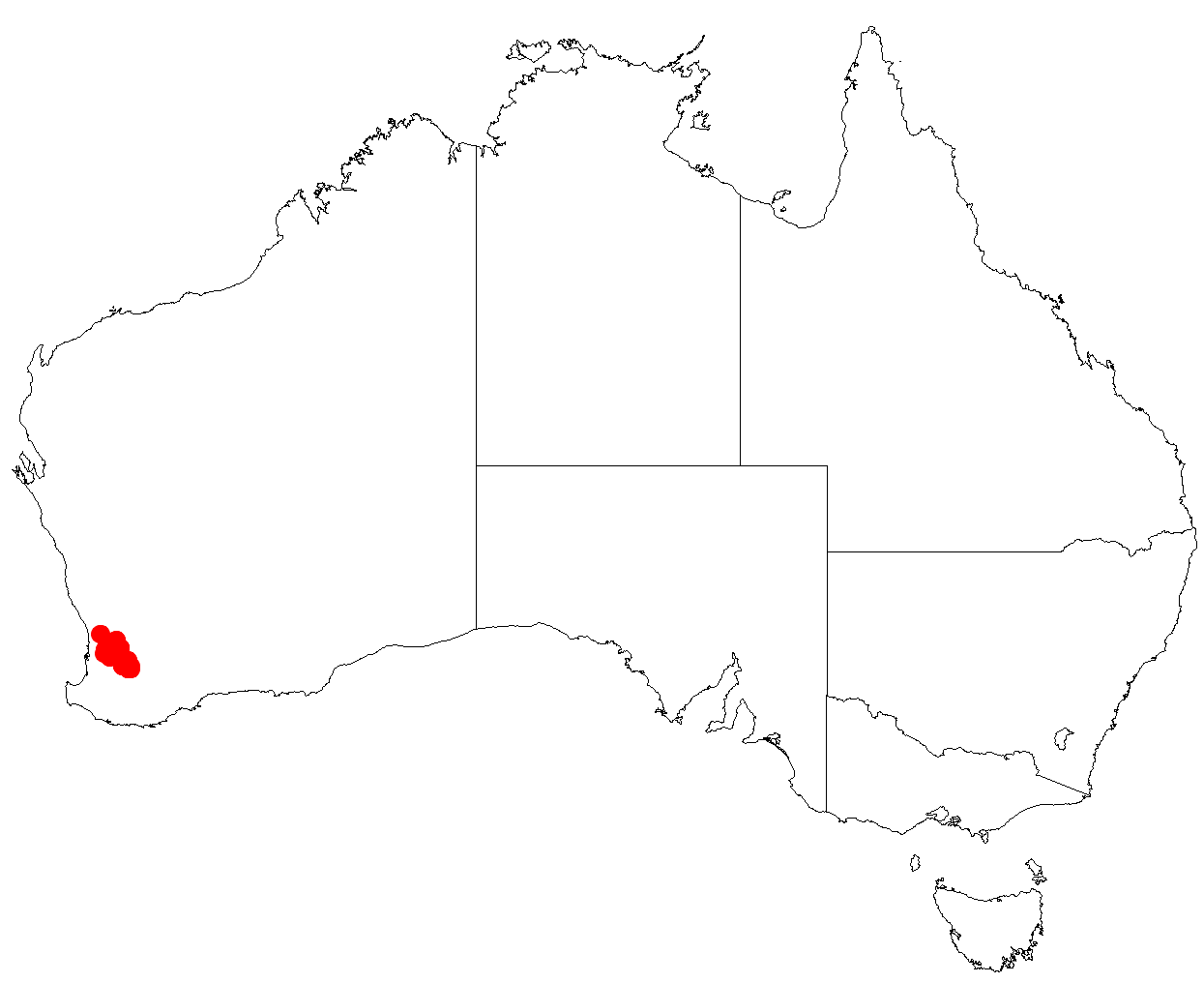
- Occurrence data from AVH

Species of plant

Leucopogon darlingensis is a species of flowering plant in the heath family Ericaceae and is endemic to the south-west of Western Australia. It is an erect shrub with hairy young branchlets, spirally arranged, linear, oblong, narrowly elliptic or narrowly egg-shaped leaves and white, bell-shaped flowers arranged in upper leaf axils and at the ends of branches.

== Description ==
Leucopogon darlingensis is an erect shrub that typically grows up to about 1.2 m (3 ft 11 in) high and 1.5 m (4 ft 11 in) wide, its young branchlets hairy. The leaves are spirally arranged, linear, oblong, narrowly elliptic or narrowly egg-shaped, 5–18 mm (0.20–0.71 in) long and 0.7–3.5 mm (0.028–0.138 in) wide on a petiole 0.3–0.8 mm (0.012–0.031 in) long. The flowers are arranged in groups of two to ten 6–12 mm (0.24–0.47 in) long on the ends of branches and in upper leaf axils, with narrow egg-shaped bracts and egg-shaped bracteoles 1.1–3.2 mm (0.043–0.126 in) long. The sepals are egg-shaped, 2.4–4.2 mm (0.094–0.165 in) long and tinged with purple near the tip. The petals are white and joined at the base to form a bell-shaped tube 1.1–2.0 mm (0.043–0.079 in) long, the lobes 3.0–4.7 mm (0.12–0.19 in) long. Flowering occurs mainly in August and September, and the fruit is a cylindrical or elliptic drupe 3.2–4.2 mm (0.13–0.17 in) long.

== Taxonomy and naming ==
Leucopogon darlingensis was first formally described in 2014 by Michael Clyde Hislop in the journal Nuytsia from specimens collected by Fred and Jean Hort near Brookton in 2005. The specific epithet (darlingensis) is a reference to the species' occurrence in the Darling Range.

In the same publication, Hislop described two subspecies, and the names are accepted by the Australian Plant Census:

- Leucopogon darlingensis Hislop subsp. darlingensis has its young branches covered with wavy or crinkled hairs, sometimes mixed with straight hairs, the petal lobes 0.9–1.2 mm (0.035–0.047 in) wide.
- Leucopogon darlingensis subsp. rectus Hislop has its young branches covered only with straight hairs, the petal lobes 0.7–1.0 mm (0.028–0.039 in) wide.

== Distribution and habitat ==
This leucopogon grows in woodland on the Darling Range. Subspecies darlingensis occurs on the eastern part of the range, from near York to North Bannister and Wandering in the Avon Wheatbelt and Jarrah Forest bioregions of south-western Western Australia. Subspecies rectus has a more restricted distribution between Williams, the Dryandra Woodland and Highbury in the Avon Wheatbelt and Jarrah Forest bioregions.

== Conservation status ==
Leucopogon darlingensis subsp. darlingensis is classified as "not threatened" by the Western Australian Government Department of Biodiversity, Conservation and Attractions but subsp. rectus is classified as "Priority Two", meaning that it is poorly known and from only one or a few locations.
