= Acacia arcuatilis =

Conservation status
- Priority Two — Poorly Known Taxa (DEC)

Scientific classification
- Kingdom: Plantae
- Clade: Tracheophytes
- Clade: Angiosperms
- Clade: Eudicots
- Clade: Rosids
- Order: Fabales
- Family: Fabaceae
- Subfamily: Caesalpinioideae
- Clade: Mimosoid clade
- Genus: Acacia
- Species: A. arcuatilis

Binomial name
- Acacia arcuatilis R.S.Cowan & Maslin
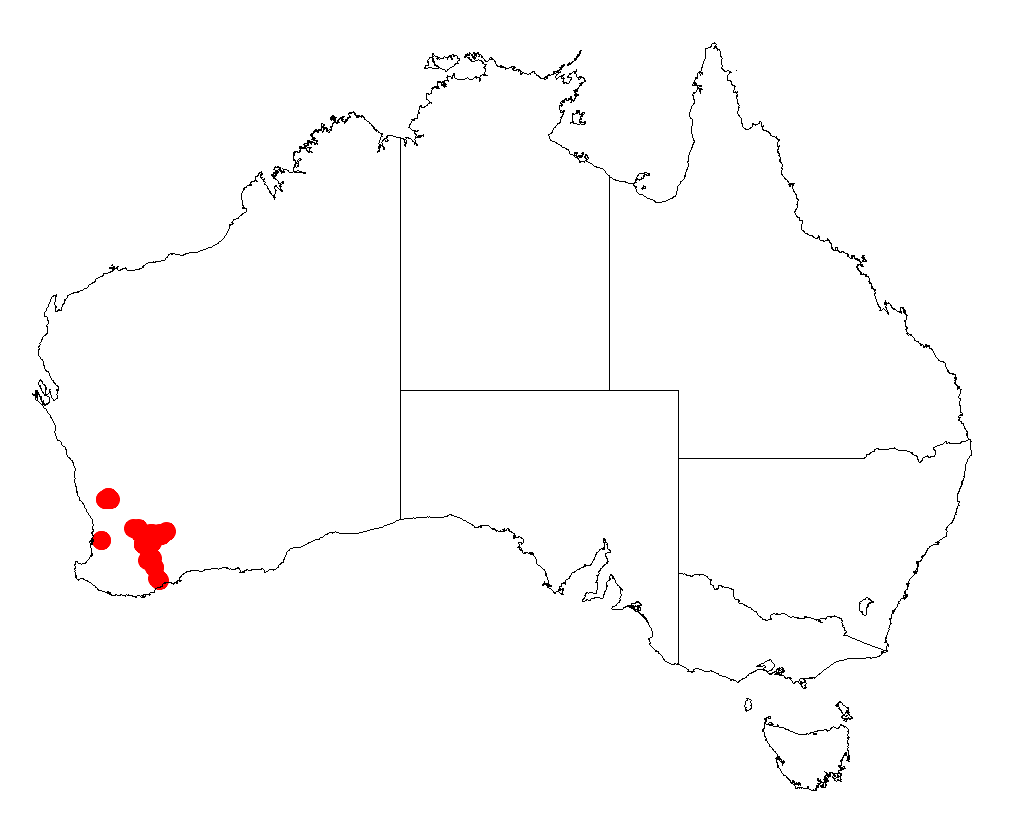
- Occurrence data from AVH

Species of legume

Acacia arcuatilis is a species of flowering plant in the family Fabaceae and is endemic to the south-west of Western Australia. It is a rounded, spreading shrub with curved phyllodes, racemes of usually two spherical heads of yellow flowers in axils, and linear pods up to 60 mm (2.4 in) long.

== Description ==
Acacia arcuatilis is a low, rounded, spreading shrub that typically grows to a height of 40–80 cm (16–31 in). Its branchlets are covered with silky hairs. Its phyllodes are curved, sometimes in a complete circle, mostly 30–60 mm (1.2–2.4 in) long and 0.5–1.3 mm (0.020–0.051 in) in diameter. The phyllodes are grey-green to almost glaucous with eight broad, flat-topped veins with hairs in the narrow furrows between the veins.

The species flowers from June to August producing spherical yellow flowers in usually two spherical, sessile heads 4–5 mm (0.16–0.20 in) in diameter, each head with 10 to 22 golden flowers in each axil. Following flowering, thinly crust-like, linear pods up to 60 mm (2.4 in) long and 1.5–2 mm (0.059–0.079 in) wide, slightly raised over and constricted between each of the seeds. The seeds are arranged longitudinally, elliptic, 2.0–2.5 mm (0.079–0.098 in) long, glossy and mottled with a conical aril about as long as the seed.

== Taxonomy ==
Acacia arcuatilis was first formally described in 1999 by Richard Cowan and Bruce Maslin in the journal Nuytsia from specimens collected 6.5 km (4.0 mi) south of Kulin in 1973. The specific epithet (arcuatilis) means 'curved like a bow', referring to the phyllodes.

== Distribution and habitat ==
This species of wattle grows in mallee, open scrub and heath on undulating plains or rises from near Bindi Bindi to Ongerup and near Hyden in the Avon Wheatbelt, Esperance Plains and Mallee bioregions of south-western Western Australia.

== Conservation status ==
Acacia arcuatilis is listed as "Priority Two" by the Government of Western Australia Department of Biodiversity, Conservation and Attractions, meaning that it is poorly known and from one or a few locations.

== See also ==
- List of Acacia species
