= 200 class =

200 class or Class 200 may refer to:

- CBH Group 200 Class, diesel-electric locomotives
- Manila Railroad 200 class, 2-10-2 steam locomotives
- NS Class 200, diesel locomotives
