= Drummond's Rose Hedge =

Rose bushes near Toodyay, Western Australia

Coordinates: 31°30′51″S 116°27′22″E

Drummond's Rose Hedge is an historic planting of rose bushes along the Bindi Bindi-Toodyay Road about 5 kilometres (3.1 mi) north of the town of Toodyay, Western Australia. It was planted in about 1860 by the botanist and farmer James Drummond near the homestead of his estate Hawthornden.

This planting of roses has been designated as a "Special Environmental Area" by the Roadside Conservation Committee of the Parks and Wildlife Service, one of just two such areas in the Shire of Toodyay. It has become a significant tourist attraction in the area.
