= Ben Cuimermara Taylor =

Australian activist

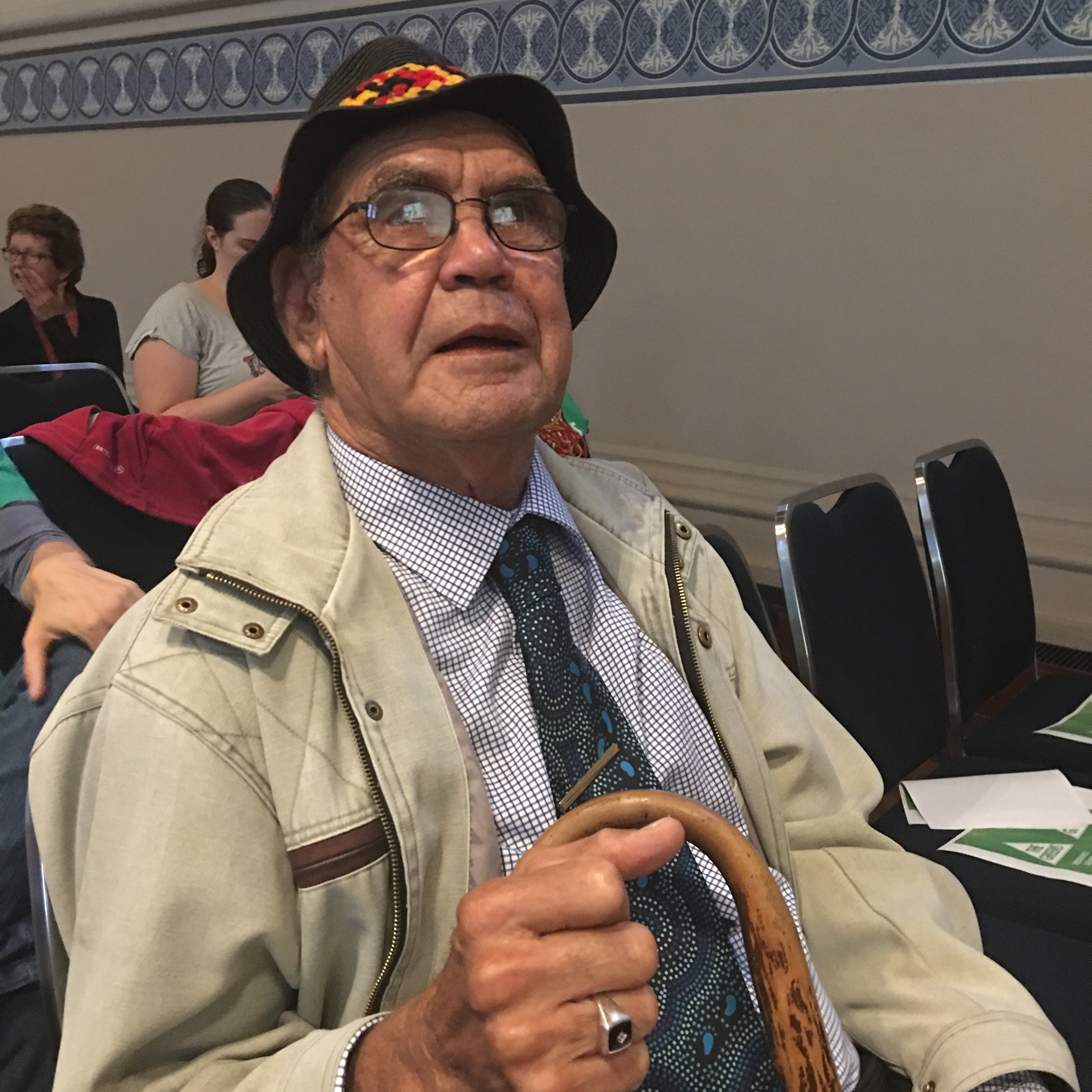
Ben Cuimermara Taylor

Benedict "Ben" Taylor, also known as Cuimara (born 15 October 1940) is a Noongar elder from the south-west of Western Australia. Taylor is a well-known Indigenous activist.

== Early life ==
Taylor grew up in Walebing, near New Norcia. His mother, Queenie Harris born in 1906 in Norseman, Western Australia and his father Rosendo "Andy" (from Yued country) was born in 1903 in New Norcia, Western Australia.

His parents met while at the Moore River Native Settlement and ran away together. According to Ben, they got married at the Catholic Church in New Norcia on 9 March 1926.

== Achievements ==
- Member of the Order of Australia, 2013: For significant service to the Indigenous community of Western Australia through contributions to a range of social justice and humanitarian rights issues.
- Involved in achieving recognition of Native Title for the Noongar people in south west Western Australia, 2006;
- Co-Chair, Deaths in Custody Watch Committee (DICWC) (WA), 2009-2010;
- Board Member; Justice Reinvestment Ambassador; Life Member, 2009.
- Current DICWC Board Representative, Community Justice Coalition of Western Australia.
- Committee Member, HALO Leadership Development Agency, since 2011
- Pastoral Care Assistant to the Chaplain, Aboriginal Catholic Ministry, 1981-1999; providing pastoral care at numerous hospitals including Royal Perth Hospital, Shenton Park Hospital, Sir Charles Gairdner Hospital, Princess Margaret Hospital and the King Edward Memorial Hospital.
- Committee Member, Kulilla Aboriginal Alcohol Service, 1979; helped to establish the Kulilla Aboriginal and Alcohol Service and the Wandering Mission Dry Out Centre.
- Counsellor, Alcoholics Anonymous.
- Member, Aboriginal Reference Group, Anglicare WA, since 2008.
- Current Adviser on Noongar protocols to the Anglican Archbishop of Perth.
- Noongar Elder Representative, Western Australian Coalition Against Racism, 2001.
- Noongar Elder Representative with Aboriginal Masters students, Centre for Aboriginal Studies, Curtin University of Technology, on a study tour to Fondu Lac Reservation, Minnesota and the Redcliffe Reservation, Wisconsin, USA, 2002.
- Member, Noongar Council of Elders, 1999.
- Awards/recognition include: Western Australian Ambassador, White Ribbon Day, 2011.
