= Shire of Narrogin =

Local government area in the Wheatbelt region in Western Australia

Coordinates: 32°56′10″S 117°10′41″E

- Local government area
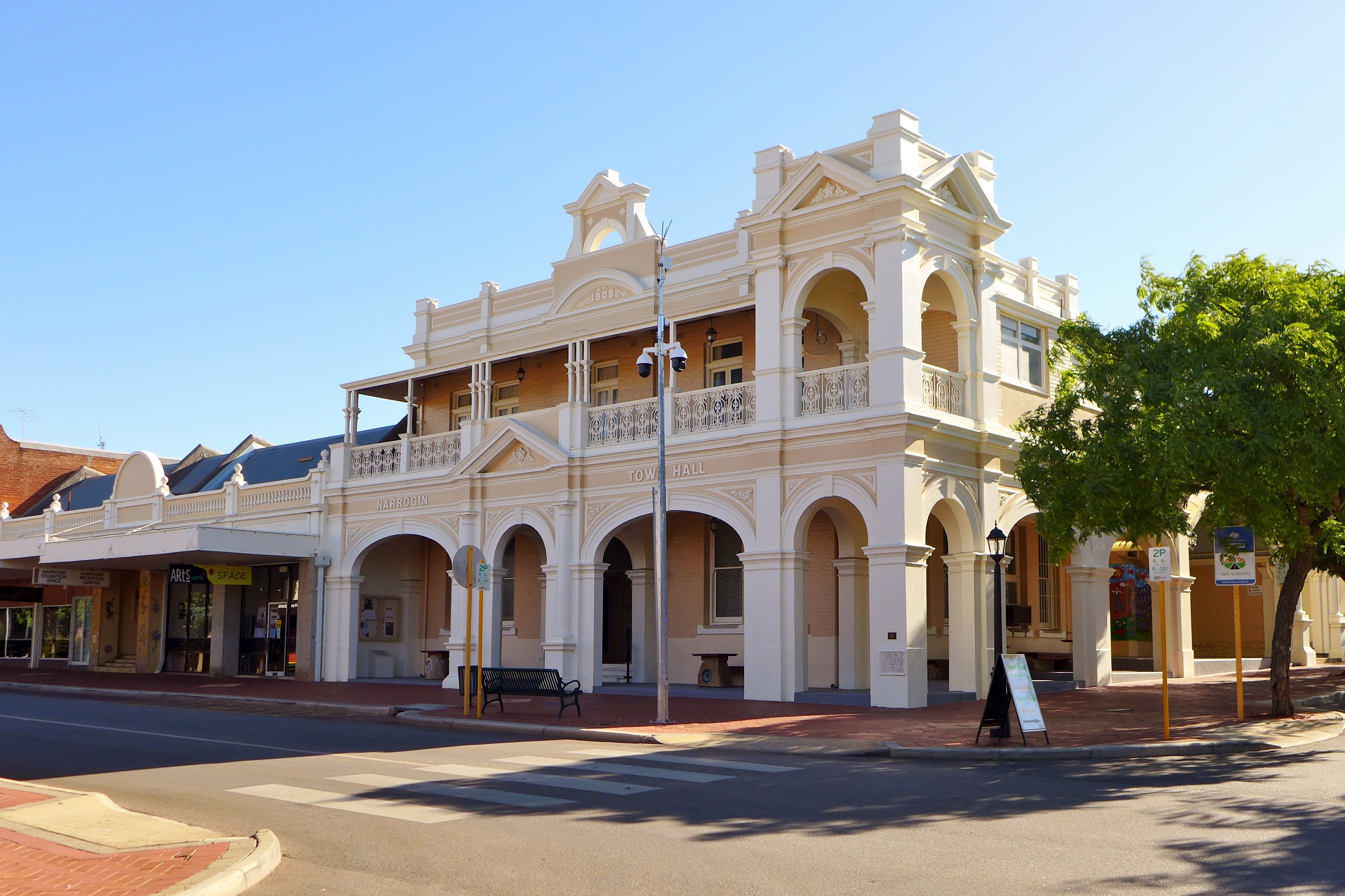
- The state heritage listed Narrogin Town Hall, 2018

- Interactive map of Shire of Narrogin
- Country: Australia
- State: Western Australia
- Region: Wheatbelt
- Established: 1892
- Council seat: Narrogin

Government
  - Shire president: Leigh Ballard
  - State electorate: Roe
  - Federal division: O'Connor

Area
  - Total: 1,618.8 km^{2} (625.0 sq mi)

Population
  - Total: 4,779 (LGA 2021)
- Website: Shire of Narrogin
LGAs around Shire of Narrogin
| Williams | Cuballing | Wickepin |
| Williams | Shire of Narrogin | Wickepin |
| West Arthur | Wagin | Dumbleyung |

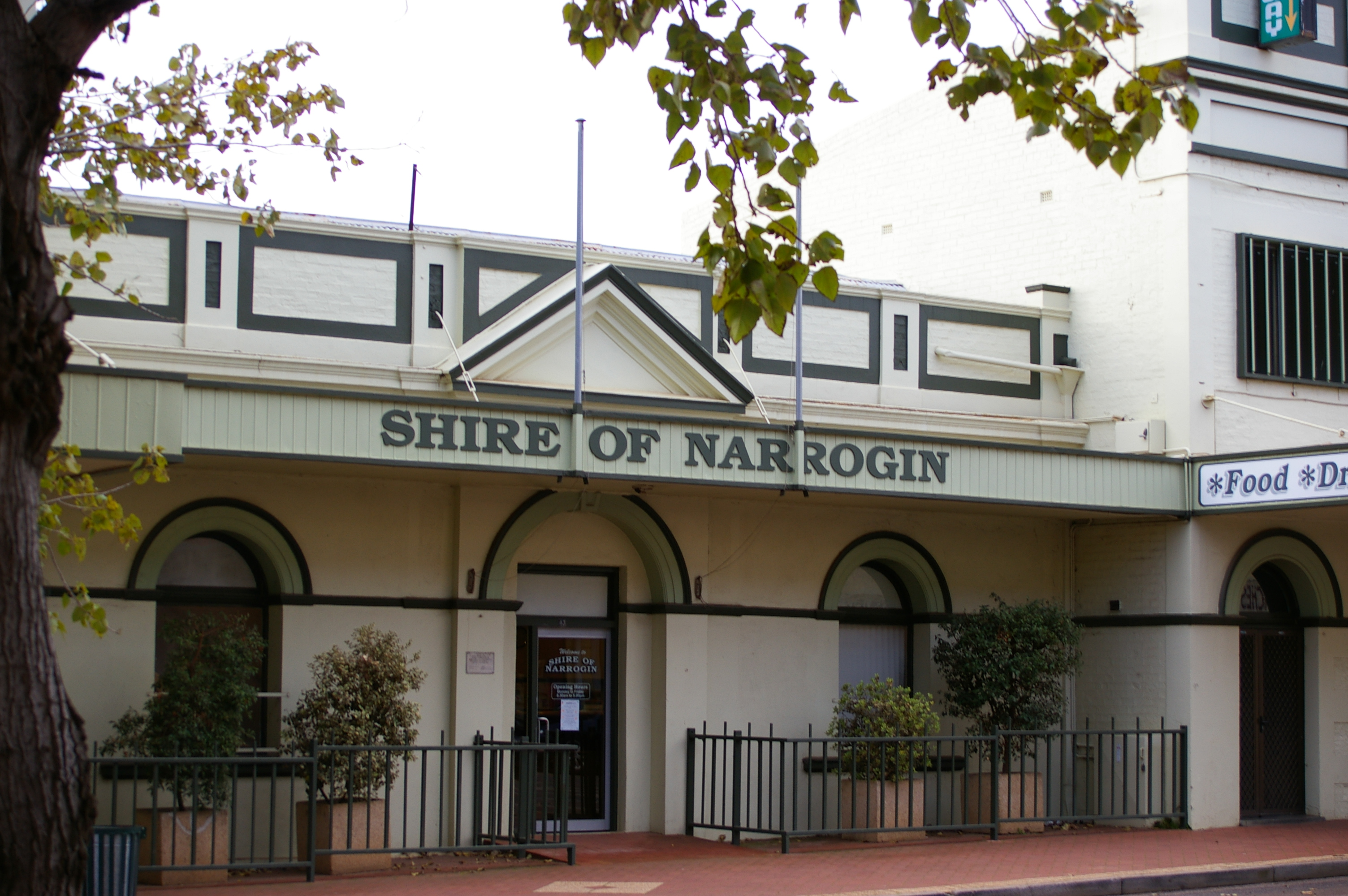
Former Shire of Narrogin offices in Narrogin

The Shire of Narrogin is a local government area in the Wheatbelt region of Western Australia, about 190 kilometres (118 mi) south-east of the state capital, Perth. The seat of government is in the town of Narrogin. Until 2016, when the two entities merged, the Narrogin townsite was governed by a separate local government area, the Town of Narrogin.

== History ==
On 19 May 1892, the Narrogin Road District came into being. On 1 July 1961, it became a Shire under the Local Government Act 1960. In 1999 and 2004, proposals to merge the Shire with the Town of Narrogin were defeated at referendum. In 2016, on 1 July, the Shire of Narrogin amalgamated with the Town of Narrogin. The new entity retained the designation of Shire.

== Wards ==
Both the Shire and the Town of Narrogin had wards, but they have since been abolished. Nine elected members now sit at large.

== Towns and localities ==
The towns and localities of the Shire of Narrogi with population and size figures based on the most recent Australian census:

| Locality | Population | Area | Map |
|---|---|---|---|
| Boundain | 53 (SAL 2021) | 214.6 km^{2} (82.9 sq mi) | |
| Dumberning | 193 (SAL 2021) | 132.2 km^{2} (51.0 sq mi) | |
| Highbury | 247 (SAL 2021) | 542.4 km^{2} (209.4 sq mi) | |
| Hillside | 72 (SAL 2021) | 41.6 km^{2} (16.1 sq mi) | |
| Minigin | 78 (SAL 2021) | 222.3 km^{2} (85.8 sq mi) | |
| Narrogin | 3,927 (SAL 2021) | 13.1 km^{2} (5.1 sq mi) | |
| Narrogin Valley | 102 (SAL 2021) | 100.3 km^{2} (38.7 sq mi) | |
| Nomans Lake | 59 (SAL 2021) | 177.8 km^{2} (68.6 sq mi) | |
| Yilliminning | 47 (SAL 2021) | 186.8 km^{2} (72.1 sq mi) | |

== Population ==
Historical population

| Year | Pop. | ±% p.a. |
|---|---|---|
| 1911 | 889 | — |
| 1921 | 1,117 | +2.31% |
| 1933 | 1,217 | +0.72% |
| 1947 | 844 | −2.58% |
| 1954 | 966 | +1.95% |
| 1961 | 972 | +0.09% |
| 1966 | 1,010 | +0.77% |
| 1971 | 905 | −2.17% |
| 1976 | 843 | −1.41% |

| Year | Pop. | ±% p.a. |
|---|---|---|
| 1981 | 813 | −0.72% |
| 1986 | 680 | −3.51% |
| 1991 | 862 | +4.86% |
| 1996 | 867 | +0.12% |
| 2001 | 843 | −0.56% |
| 2006 | 830 | −0.31% |
| 2011 | 875 | +1.06% |
| 2016 | 5,162 | +42.61% |
| 2021 | 4,779 | −1.53% |

== Heritage-listed places ==
As of 2023, 188 places are heritage-listed in the Shire of Narrogin, of which 23 are on the State Register of Heritage Places.
