= Town of Narrogin =

Coordinates: 32°56′10″S 117°10′41″E

- Local government area
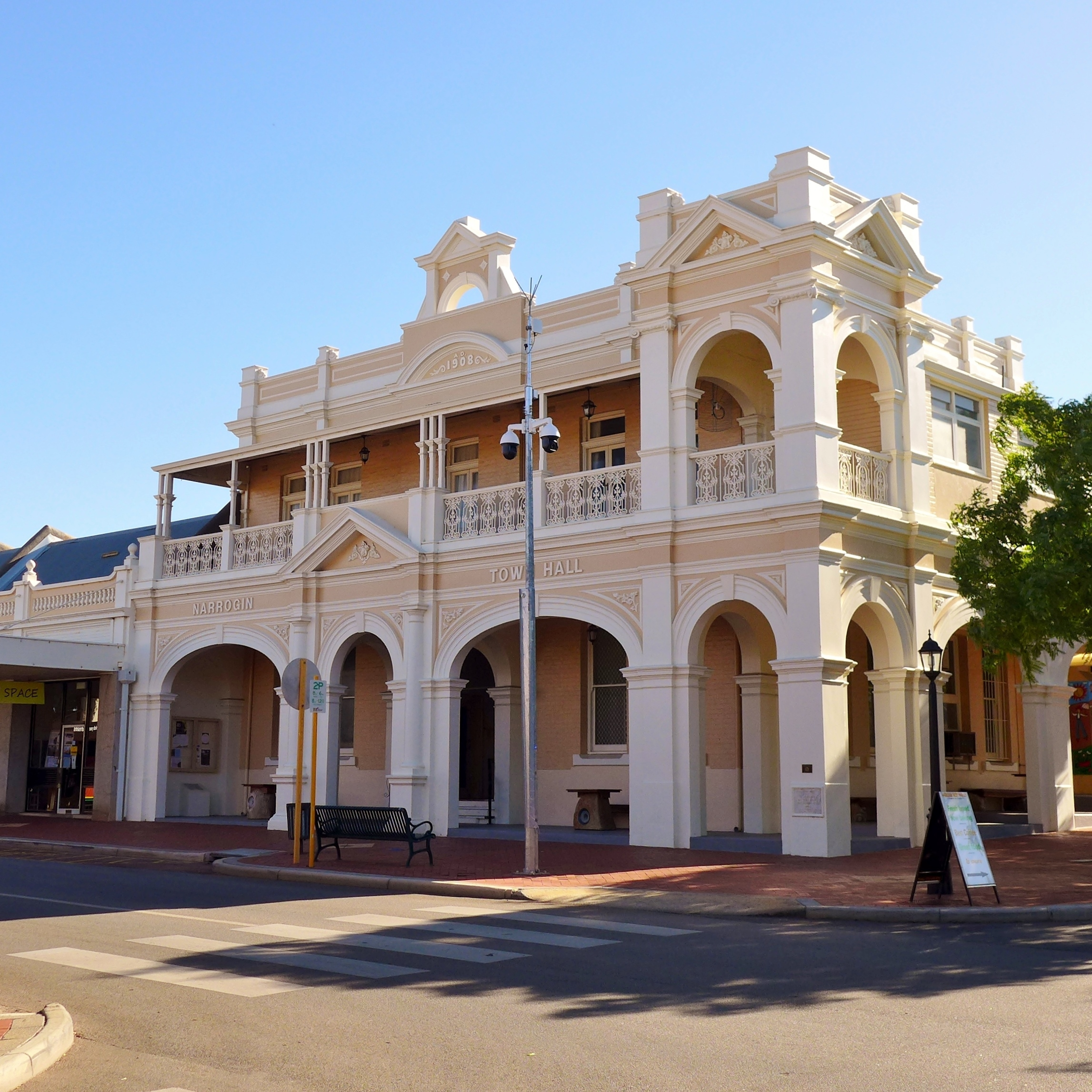
- Narrogin Town Hall, 2018

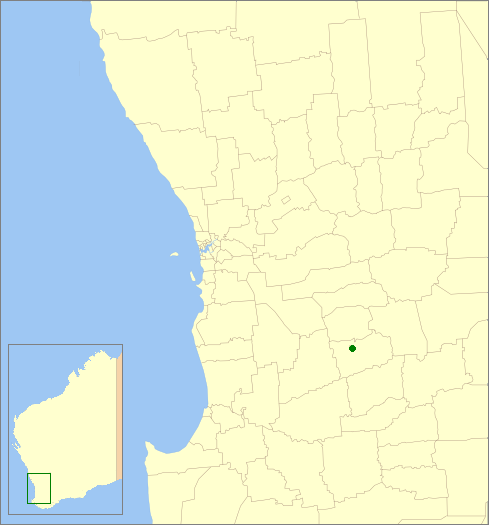
- Location in Western Australia
- Country: Australia
- State: Western Australia
- Region: Wheatbelt
- Established: 1906
- Council seat: Narrogin

Area
  - Total: 13.1 km^{2} (5.1 sq mi)

Population
  - Total: 4,430 (2013 est)
  - Density: 338.2/km^{2} (876/sq mi)
- Website: Town of Narrogin

The Town of Narrogin was a local government area of Western Australia for the town of Narrogin in the Wheatbelt region of Western Australia, 192 kilometres (119 mi) south-east of the capital, Perth along Great Southern Highway. It amalgamated with the Shire of Narrogin in 2016, with the new entity retaining that name.

== History ==
On 13 April 1906, the Municipality of Narrogin came into being. On 1 July 1961, it became a Town under the Local Government Act 1960. On 1 July 2016, it amalgamated with the Shire of Narrogin. The new entity retained the designation of Shire.

== Town council ==
At the time of amalgamation, the town had nine councillors and no wards.

== Population ==
Year	Population
1911	923
1921	1,872
1933	2,466
1947	2,558
1954	3,768
1961	4,620
1966	4,861
1971	4,849
1976	4,805
1981	5,146
1986	5,043
1991	4,635
1996	4,477
2001	4,424
2006	4,238
2011	4,219

== See also ==
- Narrogin, Western Australia
- Shire of Narrogin
