= Koojan, Western Australia =

Koojan
- Town
- Coordinates: 30°48′S 116°01′E
- Country: Australia
- State: Western Australia
- LGA(s): Shire of Moora
- Location: 160 km (99 mi) north of Perth; 18 km (11 mi) south of Moora
- Established: 1910

Government
  - State electorate(s): Moore
  - Federal division(s): Durack

Area
  - Total: 246.1 km^{2} (95.0 sq mi)
- Elevation: 201 m (659 ft)

Population
  - Total(s): 40 (SAL 2021)
- Postcode: 6510

Koojan is a small town located between Moora and Bindoon in the Wheatbelt region of Western Australia.

When the Midland railway was opened in 1894 the site of the present town was established as a railway siding. Some time afterward the area was surveyed and subdivided and the town was gazetted in 1910.

The town is named after the Aboriginal word for a nearby pool of the Moore River. The name was first recorded on maps which were surveyed in 1861 but the meaning of the word is unknown.
