= Yornaning, Western Australia =

Yornaning
- Town
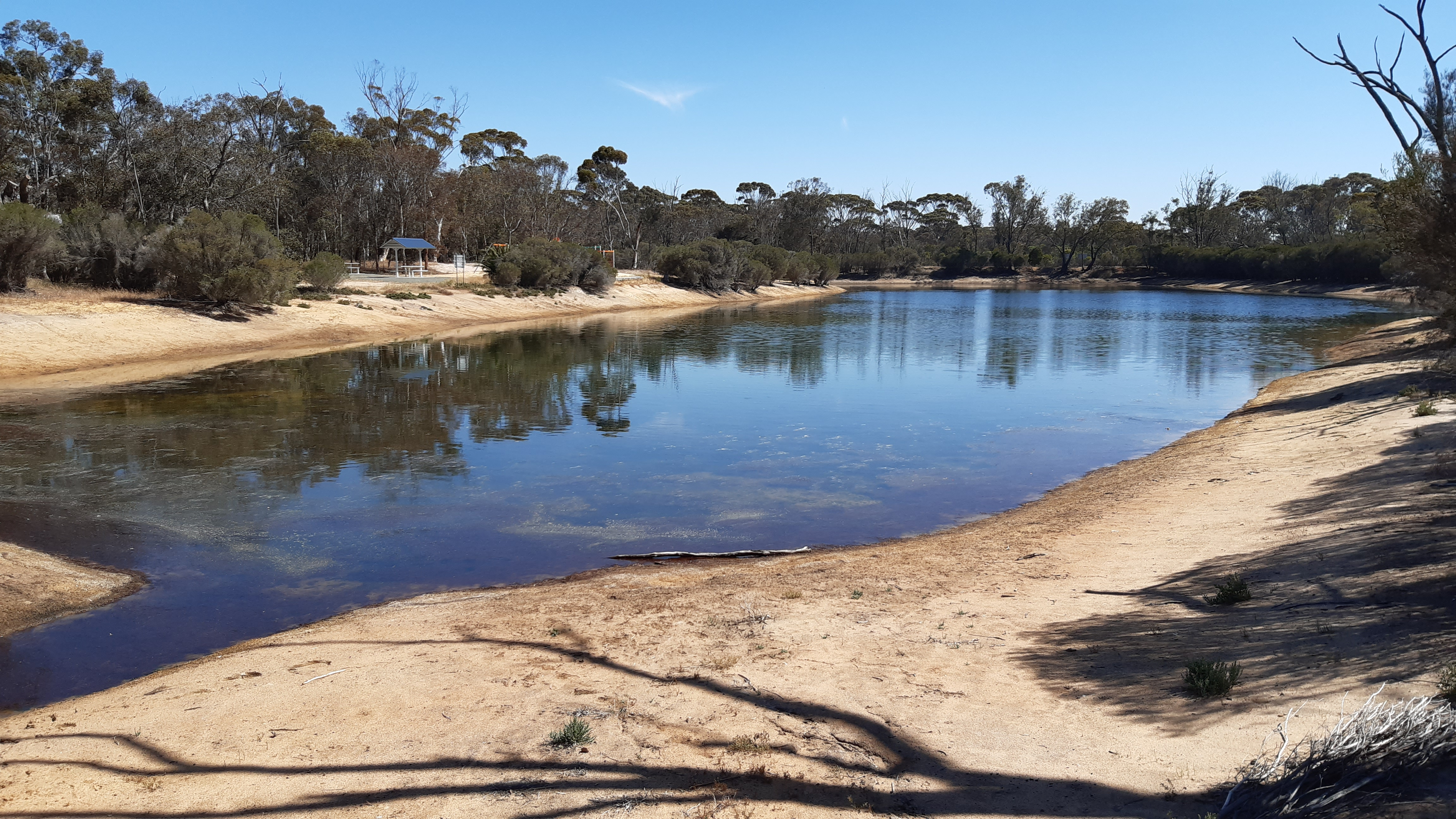
- Yornaning Dam

- Coordinates: 32°45′00″S 117°09′00″E
- Country: Australia
- State: Western Australia
- LGA(s): Shire of Cuballing
- Location: 184 km (114 mi) SE of Perth; 24 km (15 mi) N of Narrogin
- Established: 1907

Government
  - State electorate(s): Central Wheatbelt
  - Federal division(s): O'Connor

Area
  - Total: 114.6 km^{2} (44.2 sq mi)

Population
  - Total(s): 49 (SAL 2021)
- Postcode: 6311

Yornaning is a small town located in the Wheatbelt region of Western Australia, on Great Southern Highway, between Pingelly and Narrogin.

The surrounding areas produce wheat and other cereal crops. The town is a receival site for Cooperative Bulk Handling.

== History ==
The name is believed to mean "land of many waters" in the local Noongar language and was first recorded as a place name in a survey of the area in 1869; it was previously spelt "Yornanmunging" or "Yernanunging". In the late 1890s, a siding on the Great Southern Railway called simply "Water Tank" was established here, and the name Yornaning was finally arrived at in 1905 after several renamings. A townsite was gazetted adjacent to the siding in 1907, and maintenance workers for the railway were encouraged to move there. The siding was important as a major water-taking stop for the steam engines passing through – an average of 30 passenger and freight trains passed through per week.

The Yornaning Hall, a wooden building, was opened in 1912 by the Minister of Agriculture. A dam had been constructed sometime prior to 1912 and had filled with a reasonable amount of water, so much so that the Fish Acclimatisation Society were considering stocking it with fish. In 1923 a young man named William Johnstone drowned in the dam.

The railway's decline brought an end to the town's progress and all that remains today is the wheat silo, community hall and one or two buildings.

In 1993, the Shire of Cuballing obtained the area on which the Yornaning Dam sits, and upgraded it for recreational use. There is a 1.5 kilometre (almost 1 mi) walk trail around the water area, as well as picnic and barbecue facilities.
