= Cuballing, Western Australia =

Town in Western Australia

Cuballing
- Town
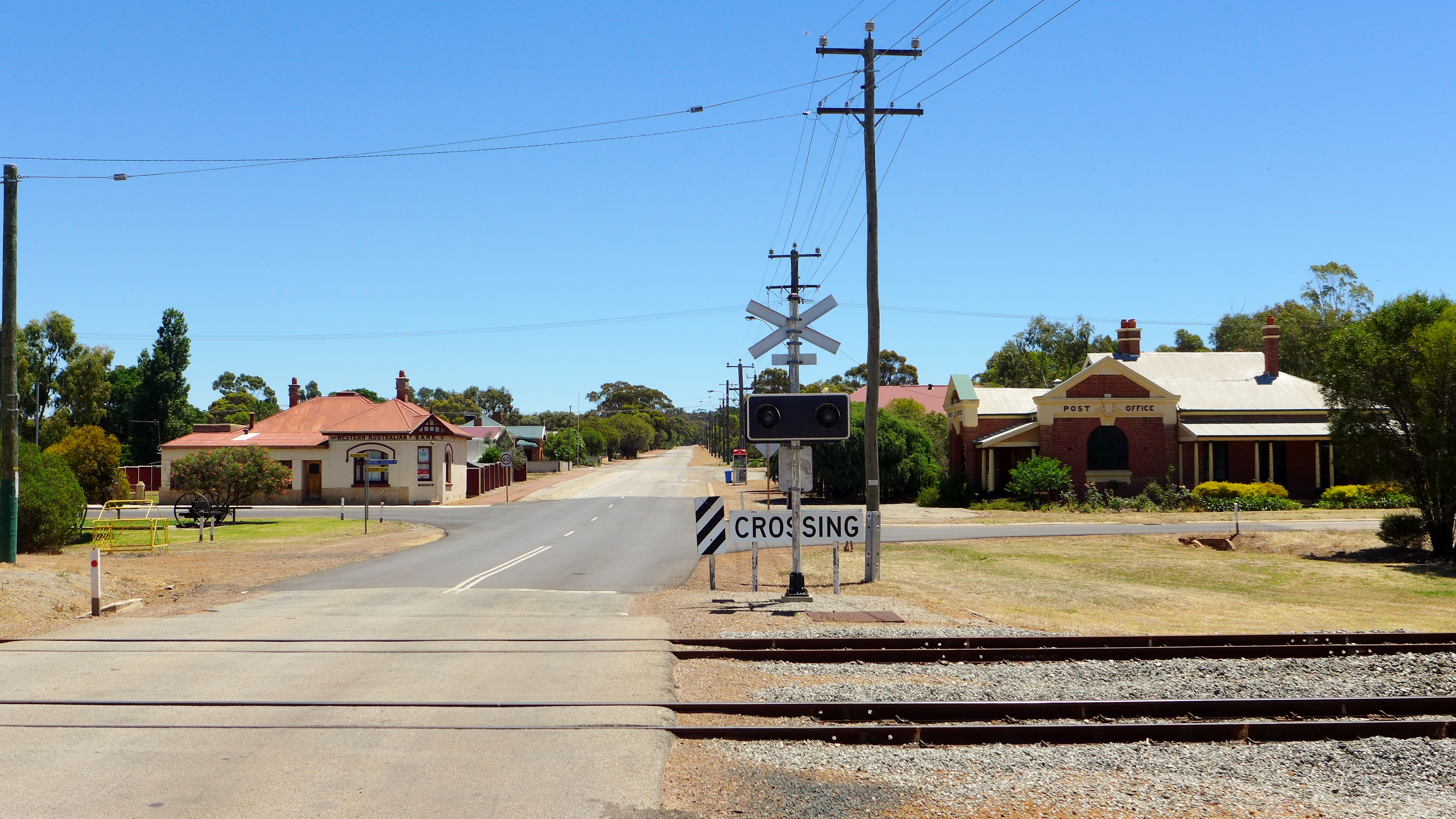
- Cuballing West Road, 2014

- Interactive map of Cuballing
- Coordinates: 32.82°S 117.18°E
- Country: Australia
- State: Western Australia
- LGA: Shire of Cuballing
- Location: 177 km (110 mi) from Perth; 15 km (9.3 mi) from Narrogin
- Established: 1889

Government
  - State electorate: Roe
  - Federal division: O'Connor

Area
  - Total: 181.4 km^{2} (70.0 sq mi)

Population
  - Total: 384 (UCL 2021)
- Postcode: 6311

Cuballing is a town in the Wheatbelt region of Western Australia, on Great Southern Highway, between Pingelly and Narrogin. At the 2021 census, Cuballing had a population of 456.

== History ==
The name is of Aboriginal origin and was first recorded in a lease application in 1868 relating to a pool near the town, and was previously spelt "Cubballing" or "Cooballing". The townsite was gazetted in 1899 and was one of the original stations on the Great Southern Railway. By 1903, a school and district hall had been appointed and the town had its own Road Board (later to become the Shire Council in 1961), and by 1906, two butcher shops, two banks, a hall, a post office, a coffee house, two blacksmiths, two churches, a boarding house and a hotel served the town's population. Many of these buildings have been preserved and can still be seen today.

However, the town did not grow after the 1920s, presumably due to the size and economic opportunity in nearby Narrogin, and in 1946 the primary school closed, meaning pupils had to travel to neighbouring towns.
