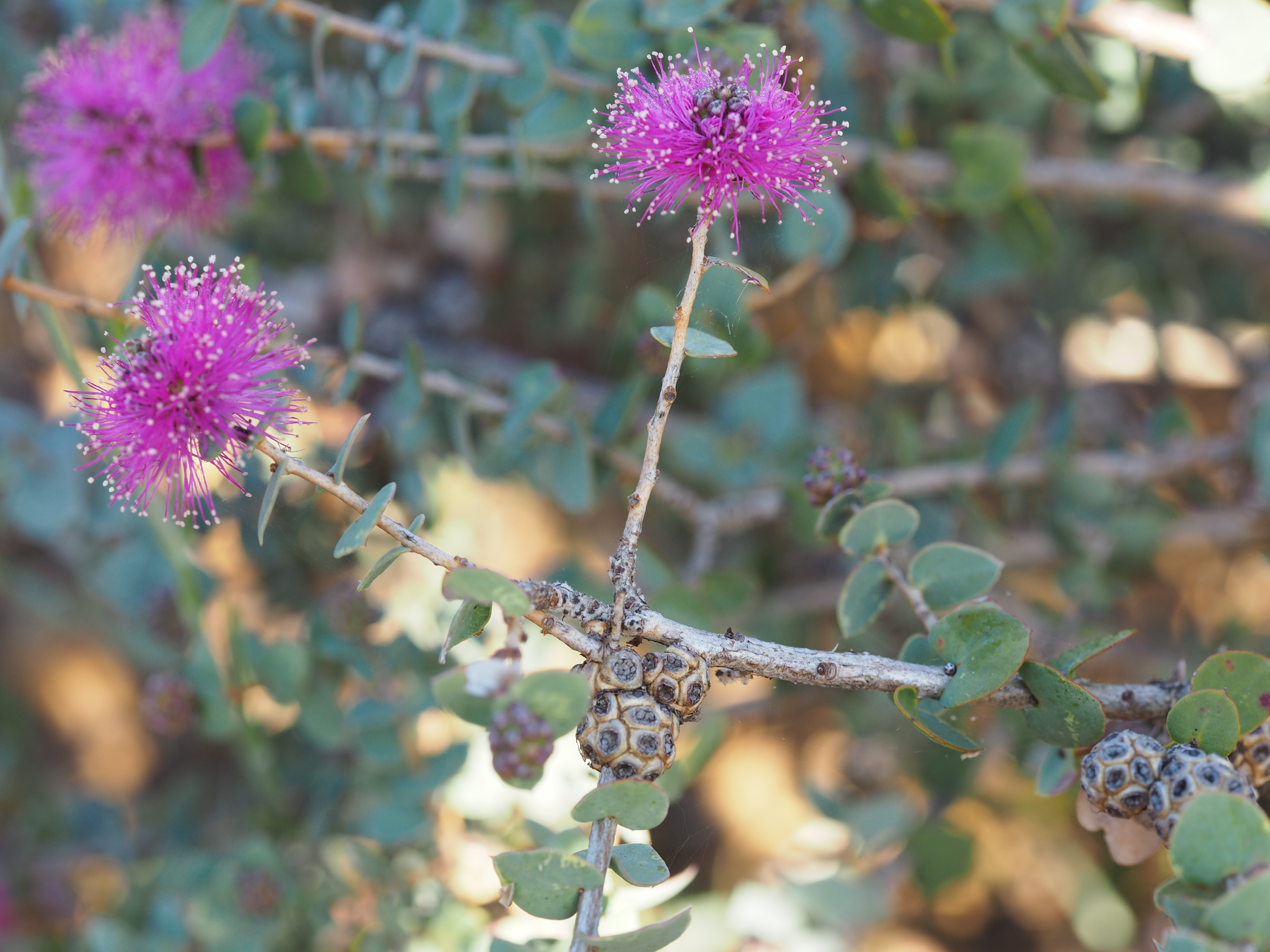

Scientific classification
- Kingdom: Plantae
- Clade: Tracheophytes
- Clade: Angiosperms
- Clade: Eudicots
- Clade: Rosids
- Order: Myrtales
- Family: Myrtaceae
- Genus: Melaleuca
- Species: M. cordata

Binomial name
- Melaleuca cordata Turcz.

Synonyms
- Melaleuca cordata Benth.; Myrtoleucodendron cordatum (Turcz.) Kuntze

= Melaleuca cordata =

Species of shrub

Melaleuca cordata is a plant in the myrtle family Myrtaceae, and is endemic to the south-west of Western Australia. It is a small shrub with erect branches, heart-shaped leaves and clusters of pinkish-red to purple flowers over an extended period.

== Description ==
Melaleuca cordata is an erect, bushy shrub which grows to a height of between 0.3 and 3 m (1 and 10 ft) with dark grey, fibrous bark. Its leaves are egg-shaped to heart-shaped, between 7.5 and 30 mm (0.3 and 1 in) long and wide with a very short, or no stalk. They are glabrous when mature, spirally arranged around the stem with 5 to 9 veins and have a pointed end.

The flowers are deep pink to purplish-red, forming roughly spherical heads of flowers, thickly clustered on or near the ends of the stems. The flowers appear for extended periods from late spring to mid-summer. The fruit which follow flowering are woody capsules about 4 mm (0.2 in) in diameter, arranged in roughly spherical clusters.

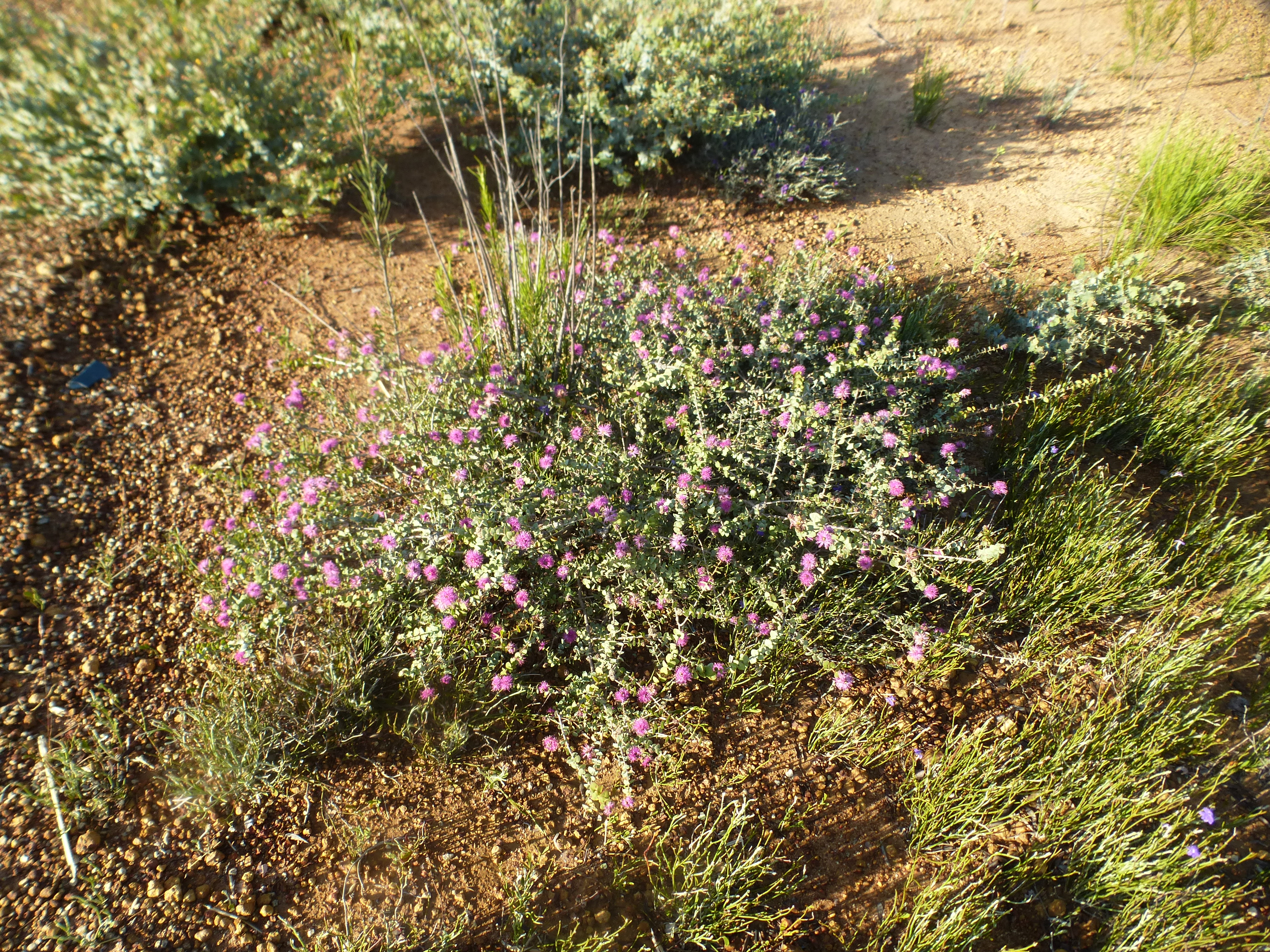
Habit near Perenjori

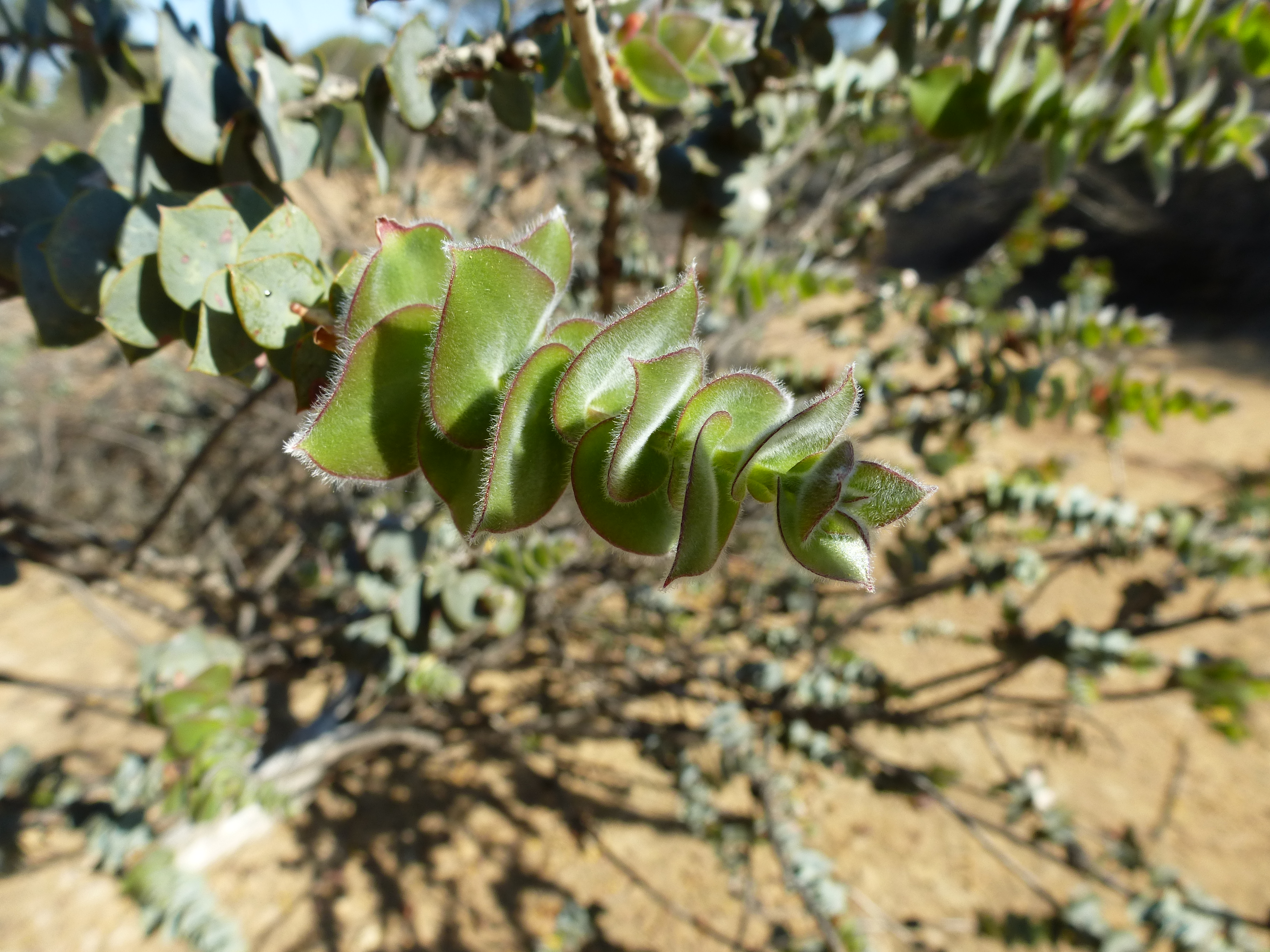
Young leaves

== Taxonomy and naming ==
Melaleuca cordata was first formally described in 1852 by the Russian botanist, Nikolai Turczaninow. The Latin specific epithet (cordata) means "cordate" or "heart-shaped", referring to the shape of the leaves.

== Distribution and habitat ==
This melaleuca is endemic to the south-west of Western Australia from the Geraldton-Mullewa districts south to the Lake Grace-Lake King area and east to Coolgardie. It occurs in the Coolgardie, Avon Wheatbelt, Geraldton Sandplains, Mallee and Warren biogeographic regions. It grows in a range of habitats including sandy, often gravelly soils on sandplains.

== Conservation status ==
Melaleuca cordata is listed as not threatened by the Government of Western Australia Department of Parks and Wildlife.

== Use in horticulture ==
Its unusual foliage and long flowering period may make M. cordata an attractive and useful garden plant. It grows in a wide range of soils in temperate areas with low winter rainfall.
