= Shire of Cuballing =

Local government area in Western Australia

Coordinates: 32°49′12″S 117°10′52″E

- Local government area
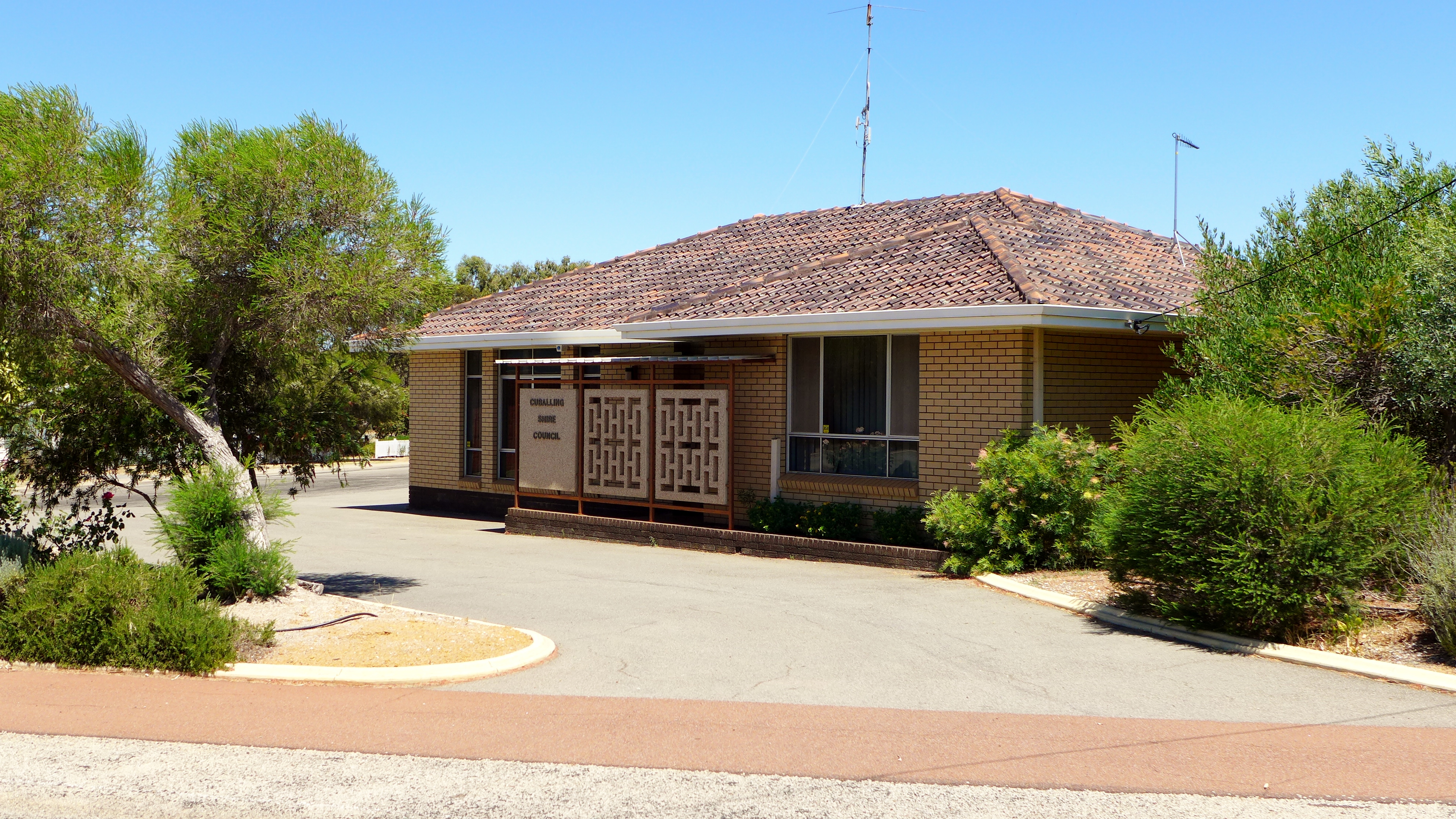
- Cuballing shire offices, 2014

- Interactive map of Shire of Cuballing
- Country: Australia
- State: Western Australia
- Region: Wheatbelt
- Established: 1902
- Council seat: Cuballing

Government
  - Shire President: Eliza Dowling
  - State electorate: Roe
  - Federal division: O'Connor

Area
  - Total: 1,195.4 km^{2} (461.5 sq mi)

Population
  - Total: 902 (LGA 2021)
- Website: Shire of Cuballing
LGAs around Shire of Cuballing
Wandering	Pingelly	Pingelly
Wandering	Shire of Cuballing	Wickepin
Williams	Narrogin	Narrogin

The Shire of Cuballing is a local government area in the Wheatbelt region of Western Australia. Cuballing is located 15.1 kilometres (9 mi) north of the town of Narrogin and 192 kilometres (119 mi) southeast of the capital, Perth. The Shire covers an area of 1,195 square kilometres (461 sq mi) and its seat of government is the small town of Cuballing.

Over 10% of its area contains native dryandra forests. The economy, worth approximately $20 million per year to the state economy, is based on agriculture, with cereal grains, sheep and pig farming being the main activities.

== History ==
On 31 October 1902, the Cuballing Road District was created. On 1 July 1961, it became a shire following the enactment of the Local Government Act 1960.

== Wards ==
On 3 May 2003, the shire was divided into two wards.

- North Ward (three councillors)
- South Ward (four councillors)

Between 1912 and 2003, the ward names were as follows:

- Cuballing Ward
- North West Ward
- North East Ward
- Central West Ward
- Central East Ward
- South West Ward
- South East Ward

== Towns and localities ==
The towns and localities of the Shire of Cuballing with population and size figures based on the most recent Australian census:

Locality	Population	Area	Map
Commodine	15 (SAL 2021)	82 km^{2} (32 sq mi)	
Contine	16 (SAL 2021)	89 km^{2} (34 sq mi)	
Cuballing	456 (SAL 2021)	181.4 km^{2} (70.0 sq mi)	
Dryandra	7 (SAL 2021)	57.9 km^{2} (22.4 sq mi)	
East Popanyinning	18 (SAL 2016)	104.9 km^{2} (40.5 sq mi)	
Lol Gray	19 (SAL 2021)	63.6 km^{2} (24.6 sq mi)	
Popanyinning	208 (SAL 2021)	186.4 km^{2} (72.0 sq mi)	
Stratherne	9 (SAL 2021)	45.6 km^{2} (17.6 sq mi)	
Townsendale	22 (SAL 2021)	83.7 km^{2} (32.3 sq mi)	
Wardering	26 (SAL 2021)	78.7 km^{2} (30.4 sq mi)	
West Popanyinning	59 (SAL 2021)	107 km^{2} (41 sq mi)	
Yornaning	49 (SAL 2021)	114.6 km^{2} (44.2 sq mi)	

== Population ==
Historical population

Year	Pop.	±% p.a.
1911	1,060	—
1921	930	−1.30%
1933	849	−0.76%
1947	677	−1.60%
1954	890	+3.99%
1961	833	−0.94%
1966	732	−2.55%
1971	663	−1.96%
1976	622	−1.27%

Year	Pop.	±% p.a.
1981	680	+1.80%
1986	636	−1.33%
1991	717	+2.43%
1996	708	−0.25%
2001	685	−0.66%
2006	779	+2.61%
2011	870	+2.23%
2016	863	−0.16%
2021	902	+0.89%

== Heritage-listed places ==
As of 2023, 28 places are heritage-listed in the Shire of Cuballing, of which three are on the State Register of Heritage Places.
