= Coomberdale, Western Australia =

Coomberdale
- Town
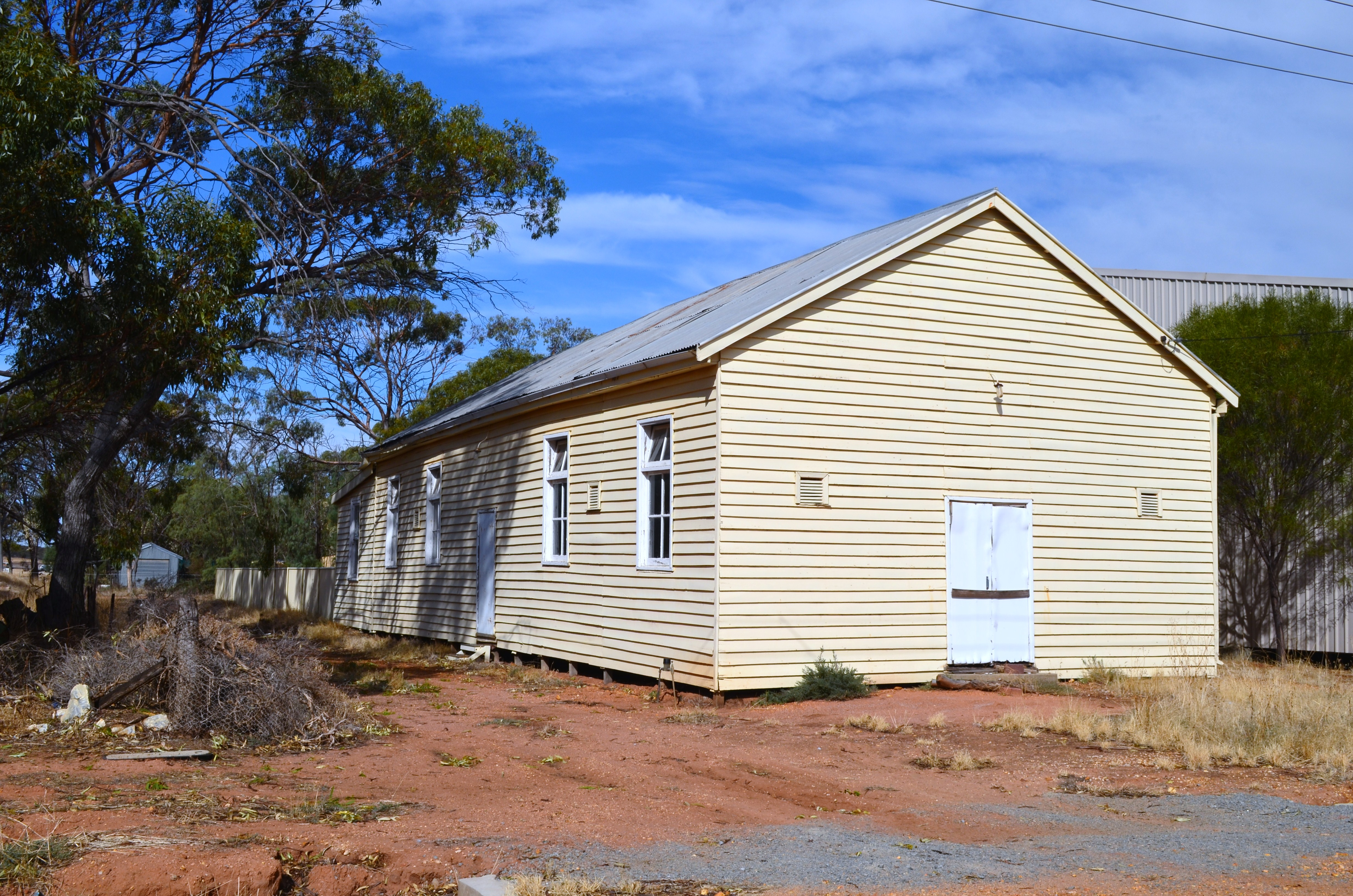
- Coomberdale Hall, 2014

- Interactive map of Coomberdale
- Coordinates: 30°28′S 116°02′E
- Country: Australia
- State: Western Australia
- LGA: Shire of Moora
- Location: 194 km (121 mi) north of Perth; 20 km (12 mi) north of Moora
- Established: 1895

Government
  - State electorate: Moore
  - Federal division: Durack

Area
  - Total: 275.5 km^{2} (106.4 sq mi)
- Elevation: 220 m (720 ft)

Population
  - Total: 56 (SAL 2021)
- Postcode: 6512

Coomberdale is a small town located along the Midlands Road between Moora and Watheroo in the Wheatbelt region of Western Australia. It had 56 residents in the 2021 census.

The Midland Railway Company constructed a railway siding in 1895 when the Midland line to Walkaway was opened. The town's name comes from a well that was named by the explorer Alexander Forrest when he surveyed a property for Edmund King who settled there in 1866.

The Coomberdale Hall, a timber framed, weatherboard clad structure with a corrugated iron roof, was built in about 1920. It is now heritage listed, and used as an adjunct to the adjoining community centre.

The main industry in town is wheat farming with the town being a CBH Group receival site.

A silicon producer, Simcoa, has a quartz mine close to the town. The mineral mined there, Coomberdale chert, is situated in the Coomberdale (also known as Noondine) threatened ecological community that contains some threatened species such as Acacia aristulata and Cryptandra glabiflora.
