= Shire of Moora =

Coordinates: 30°38′17″S 116°00′36″E

- Local government area
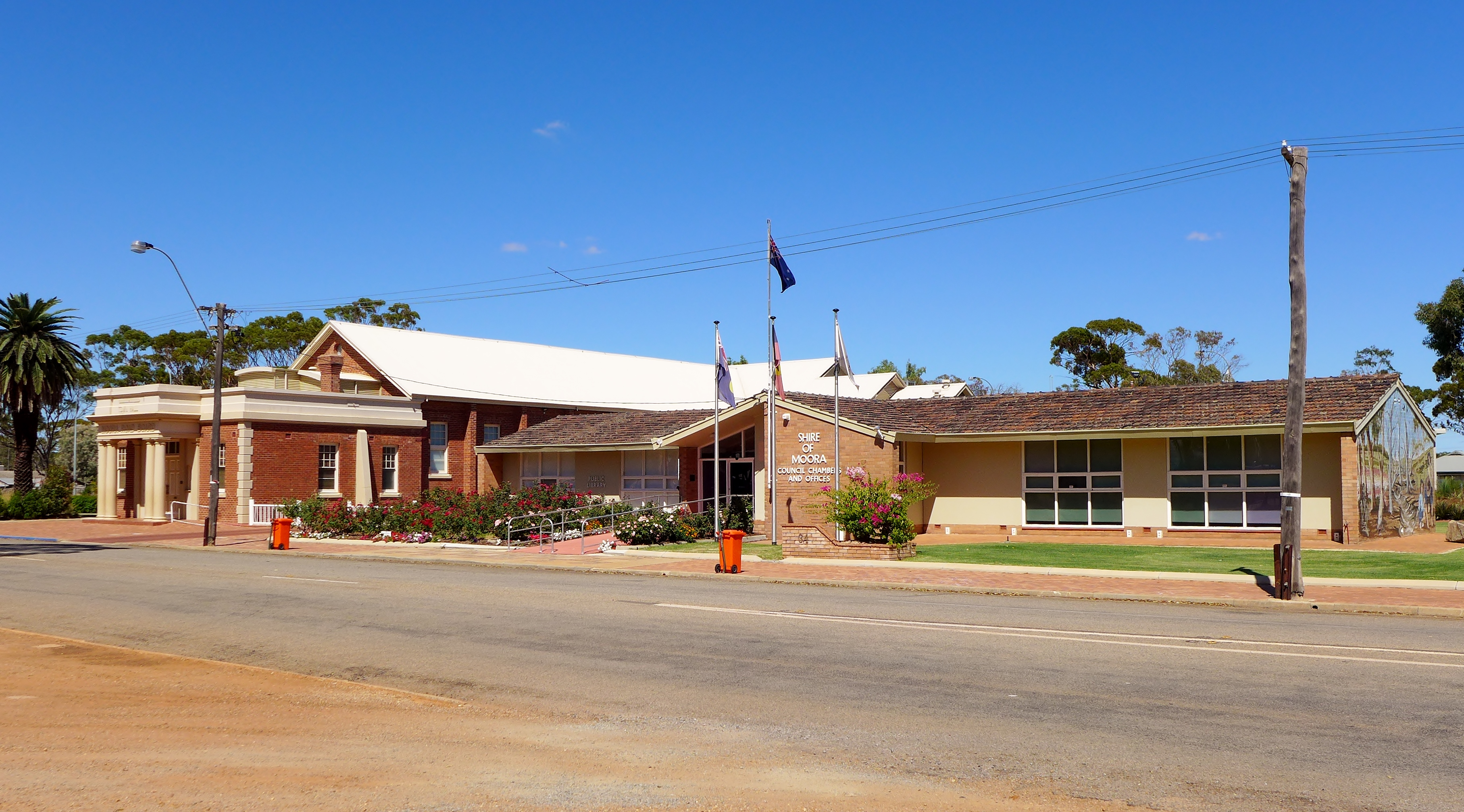
- The state heritage listed Moora Town Hall and the Shire Office, 2016

- Interactive map of Shire of Moora
- Country: Australia
- State: Western Australia
- Region: Wheatbelt
- Established: 1908
- Council seat: Moora

Government
  - Shire President: Tracy Lefroy
  - State electorate: Moore
  - Federal division: Durack

Area
  - Total: 3,766.9 km^{2} (1,454.4 sq mi)

Population
  - Total: 2,292 (LGA 2021)
- Website: Shire of Moora
LGAs around Shire of Moora
Coorow	Coorow	Dalwallinu
Dandaragan	Shire of Moora	Dalwallinu
Gingin	Victoria Plains	Wongan-Ballidu

The Shire of Moora is a local government area in the northern Wheatbelt region of Western Australia, and generally lies between the Brand Highway and Great Northern Highway about 180 kilometres (112 mi) north of Perth, the state capital. The Shire covers an area of 3,767 square kilometres (1,454 sq mi) and its seat of government is the town of Moora.

== History ==
The Moora Road District was gazetted on 11 December 1908, created from part of the Victoria Plains Road District. The first election for the Moora Road Board was on 12 February 1909. Henry Lefroy was elected chairman at the first meeting of the Road Board on 19 March 1909. Lefroy had previously been elected Chairman of the Victoria Plains Road Board in 1876.

On 1 July 1961, Moora became a Shire under the Local Government Act 1960, which reformed all remaining road districts into shires.

== Wards ==
The shire is undivided and the nine councillors represent the entire shire.

Until 20 October 2007, the shire was divided into wards, most with 1 councillor each:

- Moora Town Ward (4 councillors)
- Bindi Bindi
- Coomberdale
- Koojan
- Miling
- Watheroo

== Towns and localities ==
The towns and localities of the Shire of Moora with population and size figures based on the most recent Australian census:

Locality	Population	Area	Map
Barberton	16 (SAL 2021)	111.7 km^{2} (43.1 sq mi)	
Berkshire Valley	38 (SAL 2021)	238 km^{2} (92 sq mi)	
Bindi Bindi	59 (SAL 2021)	408 km^{2} (158 sq mi)	
Coomberdale	56 (SAL 2021)	275.5 km^{2} (106.4 sq mi)	
Gabalong	8 (SAL 2021)	76.1 km^{2} (29.4 sq mi)	
Koojan	40 (SAL 2021)	246.1 km^{2} (95.0 sq mi)	
Miling	101 (SAL 2021)	696.5 km^{2} (268.9 sq mi)	
Moora	1,755 (SAL 2021)	361 km^{2} (139 sq mi)	
Namban	35 (SAL 2021)	280.6 km^{2} (108.3 sq mi)	
Walebing	39 (SAL 2021)	285.3 km^{2} (110.2 sq mi)	
Watheroo	137 (SAL 2021)	783.4 km^{2} (302.5 sq mi)	

== Population ==
Historical population

Year	Pop.	±% p.a.
1911	1,921	—
1921	1,642	−1.56%
1933	2,088	+2.02%
1947	2,006	−0.29%
1954	2,896	+5.39%
1961	3,082	+0.89%
1966	2,981	−0.66%
1971	3,120	+0.92%
1976	3,040	−0.52%

Year	Pop.	±% p.a.
1981	3,102	+0.40%
1986	2,828	−1.83%
1991	2,654	−1.26%
1996	2,541	−0.87%
2001	2,557	+0.13%
2006	2,410	−1.18%
2011	2,476	+0.54%
2016	2,428	−0.39%
2021	2,292	−1.15%

== Notable councillors ==
- Edgar Lewis, Moora Roads Board member 1936–1939; later a state MP
- Ray Jones, Moora Roads Board member 1948–1952; later a state MP

== In popular culture ==
In January 2017, a video emblazoned with the seal of Shire of Moora was uploaded to YouTube. The video, showing a road being built, went viral, bringing unexpected attention to the area.

== Heritage-listed places ==
As of 2023, 229 places are heritage-listed in the Shire of Moora, of which five are on the State Register of Heritage Places.
