= Popanyinning, Western Australia =

Popanyinning
- Town
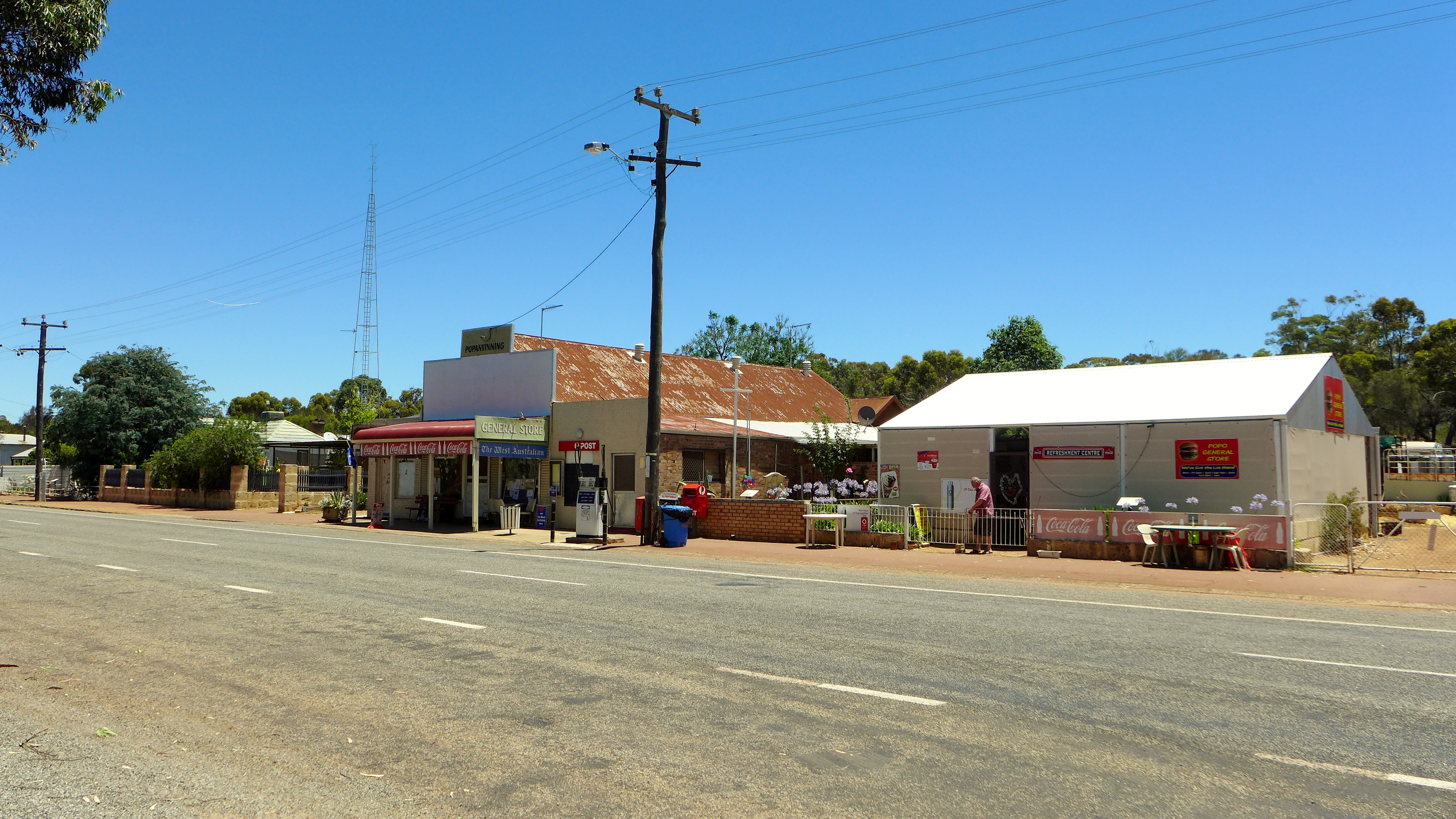
- Popanyinning General Store, 2014

- Interactive map of Popanyinning
- Coordinates: 32°40′00″S 117°07′00″E
- Country: Australia
- State: Western Australia
- LGA: Shire of Cuballing
- Location: 173 km (107 mi) from Perth; 17 km (11 mi) from Pingelly
- Established: 1889

Government
  - State electorate: Central Wheatbelt
  - Federal division: O'Connor

Area
  - Total: 186.4 km^{2} (72.0 sq mi)

Population
  - Total: 208 (SAL 2021)
- Postcode: 6309

Popanyinning is a small town in the Wheatbelt region of Western Australia, along Great Southern Highway between Pingelly and Narrogin. At the date of the 2021 census, Popanyinning had a population of 208.

== History ==
The name means "water hole" in the local Noongar language and was first recorded in a survey in 1869 for a pool in the Hotham River, and was previously spelt "Popaning" or "Popanying". The first pioneers arrived in 1893, mainly railway construction workers and their families, and the town became one of the original sidings on the Great Southern Railway. In 1903, the State Government had a few lots surveyed at the siding to meet the needs of local settlers, and in 1904 the townsite was gazetted. Within two years, 72 families were living in the district and the town was an agricultural trading post where settlers could buy supplies or conduct business with incoming or outgoing railway traffic. The Popanyinning Hotel was built in April 1906, and many small stores operated nearby.

However, the town did not grow after the 1920s, and on 9 July 1978 the hotel burnt down, never to be rebuilt.
