= Walebing, Western Australia =

Walebing
- Town
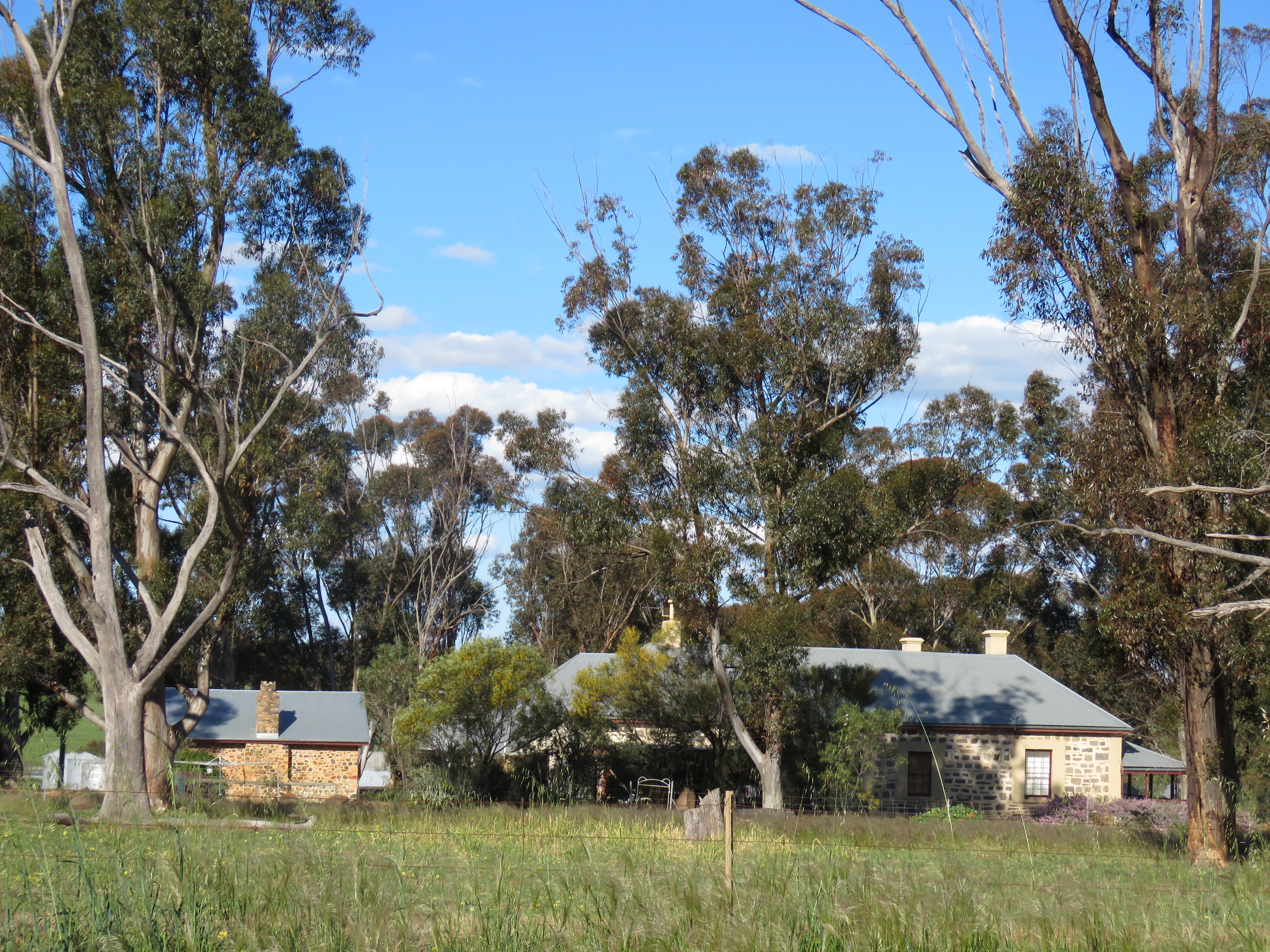
- The heritage listed Walebing buildings in September 2021

- Coordinates: 30°41′S 116°12′E
- Country: Australia
- State: Western Australia
- LGA(s): Shire of Moora

Government
  - State electorate(s): Moore
  - Federal division(s): Durack

Area
  - Total: 285.3 km^{2} (110.2 sq mi)

Population
  - Total(s): 39 (SAL 2021)
- Postcode: 6510

Walebing is a small town in the Wheatbelt region of Western Australia, in the Shire of Moora. It takes its name from the original homestead established by Anthony O'Grady Lefroy in the 1840s.

== Notable people ==
- Ben Cuimermara Taylor, indigenous activist and Noongar elder
