= Highbury, Western Australia =

Highbury
- Town
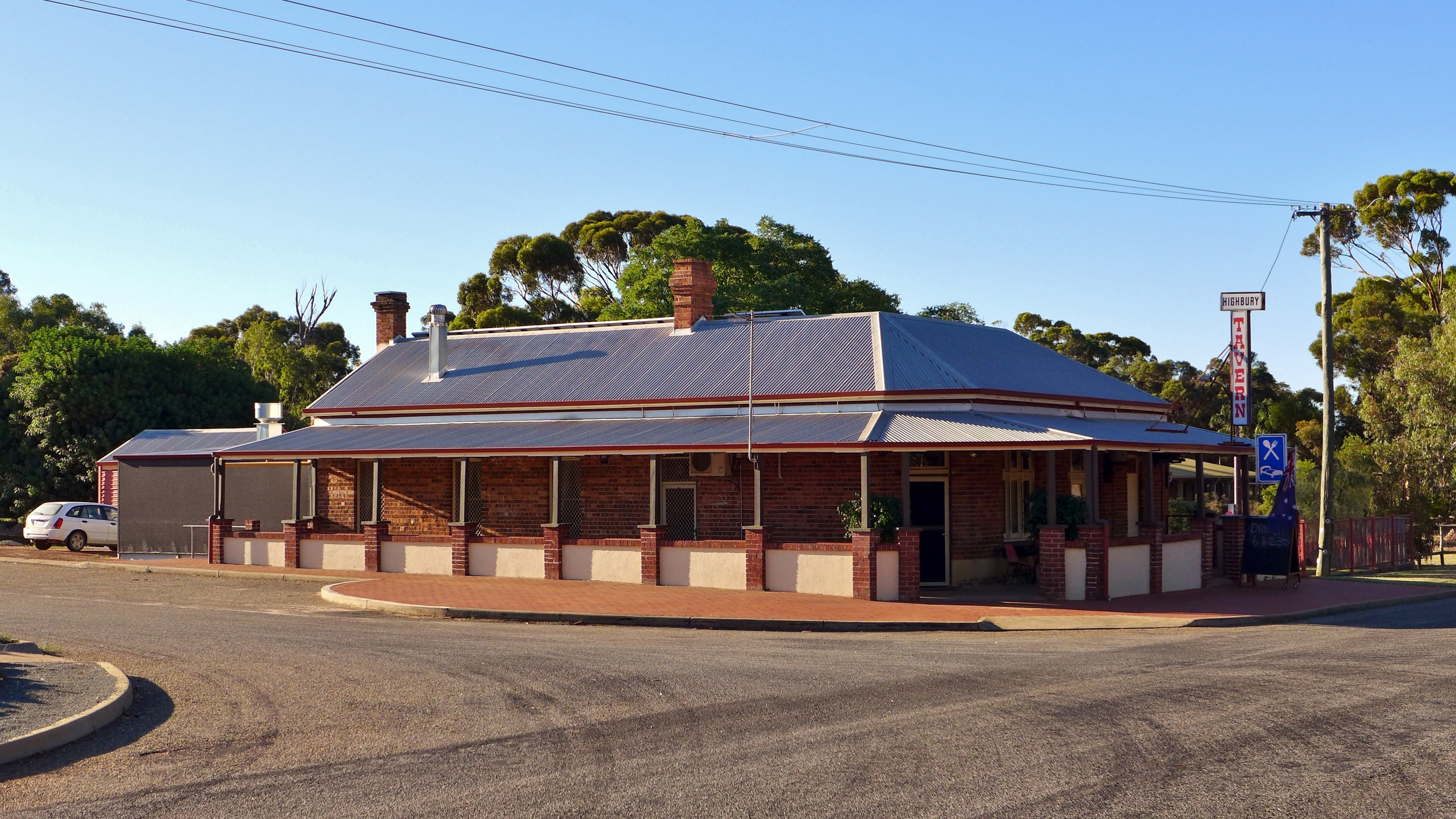
- Highbury Tavern, 2018

- Coordinates: 33.057°S 117.241°E
- Country: Australia
- State: Western Australia
- LGA(s): Shire of Narrogin
- Location: 208 km (129 mi) from Perth; 16 km (9.9 mi) from Narrogin
- Established: 1905

Government
  - State electorate(s): Roe
  - Federal division(s): O'Connor

Area
  - Total: 542.4 km^{2} (209.4 sq mi)
- Elevation: 304 m (997 ft)

Population
  - Total(s): 247 (SAL 2021)
- Postcode: 6313
- Mean max temp: 22.4 °C (72.3 °F)
- Mean min temp: 9.8 °C (49.6 °F)
- Annual rainfall: 499.6 mm (19.67 in)

Highbury, originally Wolwolling, is a small town in the Wheatbelt region of Western Australia, located along the Great Southern Highway between Narrogin and Wagin. At the 2006 census, Highbury had a population of 493.

== History ==
Like many towns, Highbury came into existence with the construction of the Great Southern Railway, when a siding was built here in 1894. Highbury was originally called Wolwolling, after Wolwolling Pool, a permanent pool in the bed of the Arthur River 7 km to the south-southeast. It was gazetted under that name in 1905, but the local progress association complained that the name was too similar to others, causing letters and goods to go astray to other places. At a public meeting the names submitted to ballot were Highbury, Scottdale, and Linton. Linton was the preferred name, however it was renamed Highbury from August 1906.

The Wolwolling State School was opened in 1904, with a permanent school building and teacher's quarters constructed in 1905. The school operated until 1946.

== Present day ==
The town today is little more than a stop on the highway, with a store, tavern and hall utilised by the surrounding agricultural district in the southern Shire of Narrogin. A group called Highbury District Community Council report to council on issues affecting the area, and in 2006 successfully proposed the construction of a war memorial next to the hall to honour those from the district who had fought and died overseas.
