= Bindi Bindi =

- Town
- Coordinates: 30°38′S 116°22′E
- Country: Australia
- State: Western Australia
- LGA(s): Shire of Moora
- Location: 209 km (130 mi) N of Perth; 35 km (22 mi) E of Moora
- Established: 1947

Government
  - State electorate(s): Moore
  - Federal division(s): Durack

Area
  - Total: 408 km^{2} (158 sq mi)
- Elevation: 310 m (1,020 ft)

Population
  - Total(s): 59 (SAL 2021)
- Postcode: 6574

Bindi Bindi is a small town located between Moora and Wongan Hills in the Wheatbelt region of Western Australia. It has a population of 59 as of the 2021 census.

The town originated as a Western Australian Government Railways siding and was gazetted in 1947. The name is believed to be Aboriginal in origin, and is thought to be a word for a sharp stick used to fasten a coat. As is usual in Aboriginal languages, doubling the word means that there are many of the same objects so it is presumed that there were many coat fastening sticks to be found in this area. Other sources indicate that the word 'bindi' means little girl in an (unknown) Aboriginal dialect, whilst the more popular translation of the term in recent times indicates that 'bindi bindi' is the Noongar word for 'butterfly'.

The main industry in town is wheat farming with the town being a Cooperative Bulk Handling receival site.

== See also ==
- List of reduplicated Australian place names
