= List of watercourses in Western Australia, 0–9 =

Western Australia has many watercourses with gazetted names, including rivers, streams, brooks, creeks, gullies, anabranches, and backwaters.

This list is complete with respect to the 1996 Gazetteer of Australia. Dubious names have been checked against the online 2004 data, and in all cases confirmed correct. However, if any watercourses have been gazetted or deleted since 1996, this list does not reflect these changes. Strictly speaking, Australian place names are gazetted in capital letters only; the names in this list have been converted to mixed case in accordance with normal capitalisation conventions. Locations are as gazetted; some watercourses may extend over long distances.

== 0–9 ==
Name	Latitude	Longitude	Remarks
1 Mile Creek	20° 52' 4" S	119° 43' 59" E	
2 Mile Brook	30° 21' 18" S	116° 3' 21" E	
2 Mile Brook	34° 21' 18" S	116° 1' 56" E	
2 Mile Creek	29° 24' 52" S	121° 54' 18" E	
2 Mile Creek	18° 1' 43" S	128° 54' 23" E	
2 Mile Creek	26° 13' 47" S	122° 4' 28" E	
2 Mile Creek	21° 31' 42" S	119° 24' 51" E	
2 Mile Gully	34° 24' 56" S	116° 36' 28" E	
3 Mile Creek	16° 30' 29" S	127° 8' 15" E	
3 Mile Creek	15° 29' 25" S	128° 6' 6" E	
3 Mile Gully	33° 28' 36" S	116° 48' 27" E	
4 Mile Brook	34° 22' 43" S	116° 0' 41" E	
4 Mile Creek	21° 40' 44" S	115° 3' 6" E	
4 Mile Creek	20° 19' 23" S	118° 39' 12" E	
4 Mile Creek	18° 41' 55" S	126° 51' 9" E	
4 Mile Creek	15° 20' 24" S	128° 40' 55" E	
4 Mile Creek	21° 27' 3" S	119° 23' 30" E	
4 Mile Creek	23° 34' 8" S	120° 1' 51" E	
4 Mile Creek	16° 30' 36" S	128° 55' 39" E	
4 Mile Creek	27° 12' 47" S	117° 9' 26" E	
4 Mile Creek	16° 51' 19" S	125° 36' 44" E	
4 Mile Creek	20° 58' 12" S	116° 44' 53" E	
4 Mile Gully	33° 48' 17" S	116° 28' 20" E	
4 Mile Gully	34° 2' 34" S	115° 39' 22" E	
5 Mile Brook	34° 22' 55" S	116° 0' 23" E	
5 Mile Creek	20° 44' 16" S	119° 40' 33" E	
5 Mile Creek	21° 36' 10" S	115° 28' 0" E	
5 Mile Creek	18° 3' 46" S	128° 49' 53" E	
5 Mile Creek	15° 46' 7" S	127° 51' 20" E	
5 Mile Creek	21° 40' 45" S	119° 22' 2" E	
5 Mile Creek	24° 28' 15" S	116° 15' 24" E	
5 Mile Creek	21° 51' 26" S	120° 8' 54" E	
5 Mile Creek	35° 0' 43" S	117° 46' 28" E	
5 Mile Creek	22° 2' 37" S	120° 13' 44" E	
5 Mile Creek	20° 55' 7" S	120° 38' 56" E	
6 Mile Brook	31° 51' 50" S	116° 41' 19" E	
6 Mile Brook	34° 28' 18" S	116° 18' 49" E	
6 Mile Creek	31° 14' 30" S	116° 37' 2" E	
6 Mile Creek	23° 58' 59" S	116° 5' 18" E	
6 Mile Creek	15° 29' 58" S	128° 8' 27" E	
6 Mile Creek	18° 42' 15" S	125° 45' 43" E	
6 Mile Creek	20° 42' 4" S	119° 16' 44" E	
6 Mile Creek	24° 1' 26" S	115° 43' 38" E	
6 Mile Creek	23° 21' 59" S	116° 57' 8" E	
6 Mile Creek	34° 12' 8" S	118° 13' 20" E	
6 Mile Creek	18° 2' 28" S	124° 11' 27" E	
6 Mile Creek	18° 31' 31" S	127° 31' 52" E	
6 Mile Creek	16° 32' 7" S	128° 57' 10" E	
6 Mile Creek	20° 49' 40" S	120° 36' 16" E	
6 Mile Gully	33° 55' 34" S	116° 18' 6" E	
7 Mile Creek	15° 30' 51" S	128° 9' 44" E	
7 Mile Creek	23° 24' 34" S	117° 7' 47" E	
7 Mile Creek	15° 9' 59" S	125° 56' 24" E	
7 Mile Creek	35° 1' 0" S	117° 46' 1" E	
8 Mile Creek	20° 57' 17" S	120° 3' 26" E	
8 Mile Creek	20° 57' 17" S	120° 3' 26" E	
8 Mile Creek	15° 41' 29" S	128° 52' 39" E	
8 Mile Creek	17° 46' 51" S	124° 41' 51" E	
8 Mile Creek	15° 31' 20" S	128° 10' 36" E	
8 Mile Creek	20° 56' 35" S	119° 51' 19" E	
8 Mile Gully	34° 3' 11" S	117° 9' 32" E	
9 Mile Creek	16° 50' 27" S	128° 46' 27" E	
9 Mile Creek	24° 56' 53" S	115° 54' 7" E	
9 Mile Creek	29° 19' 36" S	121° 50' 1" E	
9 Mile Creek	15° 31' 59" S	128° 11' 4" E	
10 Mile Brook	33° 57' 57" S	115° 7' 38" E	
10 Mile Creek	18° 54' 40" S	128° 15' 39" E	
10 Mile Creek	20° 57' 51" S	120° 5' 9" E	
10 Mile Gully	34° 4' 20" S	117° 9' 49" E	
12 Mile Creek	26° 23' 13" S	117° 19' 51" E	
12 Mile Creek	21° 48' 42" S	119° 25' 39" E	
12 Mile Creek	24° 25' 13" S	118° 33' 57" E	
13 Creek	23° 18' 30" S	120° 26' 48" E	
13 Mile Brook	31° 52' 52" S	116° 34' 34" E	
13 Mile Creek	20° 58' 31" S	120° 3' 59" E	
14 Mile Brook	32° 46' 21" S	116° 42' 32" E	
14 Mile Creek	26° 23' 55" S	122° 26' 42" E	
14 Mile Creek	28° 20' 38" S	120° 32' 28" E	
14 Mile Creek	16° 55' 43" S	128° 57' 13" E	
15 Mile Creek	18° 4' 16" S	127° 48' 8" E	
19 Mile Creek	18° 1' 19" S	127° 48' 37" E	
20 Mile Gully	32° 44' 53" S	116° 6' 26" E	
20 Mile Sandy Creek	21° 42' 14" S	120° 19' 27" E	
26 Mile Gully	32° 47' 22" S	116° 10' 7" E	
31 Mile Creek	24° 25' 14" S	114° 37' 52" E	
31 River	24° 36' 31" S	116° 2' 50" E	
33 River	24° 37' 34" S	116° 7' 17" E	
34 Mile Brook	32° 48' 44" S	116° 23' 11" E	
36 Mile Creek	24° 26' 34" S	114° 34' 35" E	
38 Creek	23° 11' 47" S	120° 54' 7" E	
39 Gully	31° 47' 18" S	116° 20' 22" E	
39 Mile Brook	32° 23' 8" S	116° 8' 29" E	
47 Mile Creek	22° 29' 44" S	116° 32' 13" E	
52 Creek	33° 40' 45" S	116° 55' 36" E	
The 52 Creek	33° 40' 47" S	116° 55' 32" E	
67 Mile Creek	17° 28' 30" S	124° 30' 50" E	
92 Mile Creek	17° 44' 58" S	124° 56' 57" E	
92 Mile Gully	32° 56' 27" S	116° 46' 51" E	
95 Mile Creek	27° 9' 31" S	117° 55' 49" E	
97 Mile Creek	17° 46' 42" S	125° 2' 24" E	
477 Creek	24° 49' 13" S	120° 16' 21" E	

== See also ==
- Geography of Western Australia
