= List of watercourses in Western Australia, A =

Western Australia has many watercourses with gazetted names, including rivers, streams, brooks, creeks, gullies, anabranches and backwaters.

This list is complete with respect to the 1996 Gazetteer of Australia. Dubious names have been checked against the online 2004 data, and in all cases confirmed correct. However, if any watercourses have been gazetted or deleted since 1996, this list does not reflect these changes. Strictly speaking, Australian place names are gazetted in capital letters only; the names in this list have been converted to mixed case in accordance with normal capitalisation conventions. Locations are as gazetted; some watercourses may extend over long distances.

| Name | Latitude | Longitude | Remarks |
|---|---|---|---|
| Abandon Creek | 15° 4' 33" S | 126° 34' 48" E | |
| Abba River | 33° 39' 6" S | 115° 27' 40" E | |
| Abercorne Creek | 15° 37' 13" S | 128° 22' 8" E | |
| Abyssinia Creek | 21° 43' 52" S | 119° 17' 55" E | |
| Adcock River | 17° 33' 21" S | 126° 8' 23" E | |
| Addie Creek | 18° 10' 46" S | 128° 8' 29" E | |
| Adelaide Brook | 34° 5' 10" S | 115° 20' 9" E | |
| Adenotricha Creek | 15° 21' 32" S | 124° 45' 57" E | |
| Agett Brook | 31° 43' 6" S | 116° 39' 19" E | |
| Agnes Gully | 32° 49' 49" S | 119° 59' 26" E | |
| Ahern Creek | 17° 15' 35" S | 128° 33' 33" E | |
| Aida Vale Creek | 16° 44' 34" S | 127° 52' 32" E | |
| Ainslie Creek | 26° 15' 35" S | 126° 36' 53" E | |
| Airport Creek | 17° 20' 23" S | 123° 37' 1" E | |
| Aitchison Creek | 20° 16' 20" S | 128° 35' 40" E | |
| Alexander Creek | 17° 7' 23" S | 124° 0' 53" E | |
| Alexander River | 33° 52' 35" S | 122° 46' 6" E | |
| Algae Creek | 18° 35' 47" S | 126° 5' 26" E | |
| Alice Creek | 18° 25' 52" S | 128° 56' 14" E | |
| Allen Creek (Western Australia) | 34° 1' 49" S | 118° 10' 54" E | |
| Alligator Creek | 17° 25' 59" S | 123° 34' 43" E | |
| Alligator Creek | 16° 57' 5" S | 122° 30' 30" E | |
| Alma River | 23° 56' 25" S | 115° 47' 13" E | |
| Almanac Brook | 32° 55' 3" S | 116° 10' 5" E | |
| Alpha Creek | 15° 50' 14" S | 128° 19' 2" E | |
| Alwey Creek | 26° 35' 28" S | 120° 30' 45" E | |
| Amuri Creek | 34° 42' 11" S | 117° 18' 0" E | |
| Anderson Dale | 10° 28' 58" S | 105° 33' 11" E | |
| Andrew Creek | 14° 20' 12" S | 126° 55' 55" E | |
| Andy Creek | 20° 57' 54" S | 120° 8' 2" E | |
| Angelo River | 23° 42' 30" S | 117° 44' 48" E | |
| Angove River | 34° 56' 21" S | 118° 10' 1" E | |
| Angus Creek | 28° 20' 52" S | 122° 15' 35" E | |
| Ann Creek | 25° 58' 31" S | 122° 16' 49" E | |
| Annabel Creek | 33° 37' 21" S | 119° 59' 26" E | |
| Annie Brook | 33° 41' 12" S | 115° 9' 29" E | |
| Annie Creek | 16° 51' 16" S | 124° 52' 23" E | |
| Annie Creek | 17° 32' 2" S | 126° 6' 29" E | |
| Apex Creek | 17° 10' 0" S | 125° 13' 33" E | |
| Apple Tree Creek | 16° 8' 27" S | 127° 43' 23" E | |
| Archie Creek | 16° 41' 37" S | 127° 58' 14" E | |
| Archies Brook | 32° 44' 9" S | 116° 3' 10" E | |
| Archies Oven Gully | 34° 17' 45" S | 116° 3' 37" E | |
| Argnal Creek | 15° 12' 45" S | 127° 47' 31" E | |
| Armanda River | 17° 54' 54" S | 127° 51' 46" E | |
| Armstrong Creek | 21° 1' 41" S | 116° 40' 14" E | |
| Arnold Park Brook | 31° 55' 17" S | 116° 44' 56" E | |
| Arrowsmith River | 29° 29' 46" S | 115° 2' 32" E | |
| Arthur Creek (Western Australia) | 16° 2' 4" S | 128° 20' 19" E | |
| Arthur River | 33° 41' 2" S | 116° 43' 48" E | |
| Arungana Creek | 15° 11' 31" S | 127° 54' 44" E | |
| Asbestos Creek | 21° 52' 54" S | 117° 46' 26" E | |
| Asbestos Gully | 31° 35' 21" S | 119° 39' 0" E | |
| Ashburton River | 23° 34' 1" S | 117° 22' 12" E | |
| Ashton Creek | 16° 11' 34" S | 125° 27' 39" E | |
| Ask Creek | 17° 23' 13" S | 123° 34' 43" E | |
| Augustus River | 33° 12' 26" S | 116° 0' 16" E | |
| Aurillia Creek | 25° 9' 16" S | 116° 54' 26" E | |
| Aurillia Creek Racecourse Branch | 24° 51' 36" S | 116° 57' 50" E | |
| Austin Creek | 24° 33' 46" S | 115° 23' 10" E | |
| Avon River | 31° 44' 4" S | 116° 4' 23" E | |

== See also ==
- Geography of Western Australia
