= List of watercourses in Western Australia, N–Q =

Western Australia has many watercourses with gazetted names, including rivers, streams, brooks, creeks, gullies, anabranches and backwaters.

This list is complete with respect to the 1996 Gazetteer of Australia. Dubious names have been checked against the online 2004 data, and in all cases confirmed correct. However, if any watercourses have been gazetted or deleted since 1996, this list does not reflect these changes. Strictly speaking, Australian place names are gazetted in capital letters only; the names in this list have been converted to mixed case in accordance with normal capitalisation conventions. Locations are as gazetted; some watercourses may extend over long distances.

== N ==
Name	Latitude	Longitude	Remarks
Naasra Creek	15° 44' 14" S	128° 18' 1" E	
Nairn Brook	32° 48' 26" S	116° 44' 20" E	
Nakar Creek	21° 40' 40" S	127° 46' 47" E	
Nalgomia Creek	23° 54' 41" S	118° 41' 7" E	
Nallan Creek	27° 28' 33" S	117° 41' 16" E	
Nalyaring Gully	32° 17' 22" S	117° 11' 55" E	
Nalyerlup Creek	34° 14' 7" S	118° 24' 58" E	
Nambab Brook	31° 41' 43" S	116° 1' 0" E	
Nambeelup Brook	32° 31' 37" S	115° 48' 10" E	
Nambling Creek	31° 25' 40" S	116° 27' 29" E	
Nambrock Creek	28° 35' 46" S	122° 29' 25" E	
Nambung River	30° 32' 33" S	115° 8' 53" E	
Namingnurrabunga Creek	25° 30' 0" S	122° 44' 38" E	
Nanamullen Brook	31° 43' 12" S	116° 31' 23" E	
Nananah Creek	20° 9' 10" S	119° 14' 4" E	
Nanga Brook	32° 48' 6" S	116° 6' 12" E	
Nangaloo Creek	16° 19' 4" S	125° 32' 44" E	
Nangerwalla Creek	28° 19' 38" S	115° 24' 28" E	
Nangetty Creek	29° 4' 21" S	115° 25' 12" E	
Nangip Gully	33° 20' 5" S	116° 43' 42" E	
Nannup Brook	34° 1' 0" S	115° 49' 9" E	
Nanthana Creek	21° 1' 0" S	117° 4' 59" E	
Nanular Creek	25° 2' 29" S	117° 31' 55" E	
Nanular Well	25° 9' 54" S	117° 34' 23" E	
Nanyerinny Creek	24° 50' 6" S	120° 1' 53" E	
Napalgunia Creek	31° 0' 54" S	122° 31' 33" E	
Napier Creek	34° 51' 19" S	117° 59' 26" E	
Napier Creek	16° 38' 2" S	126° 19' 41" E	
Napier Creek	17° 20' 37" S	124° 40' 22" E	
Naramucking Gully	32° 42' 45" S	117° 17' 35" E	
Nardoo Creek	24° 35' 13" S	116° 3' 26" E	
Nareling Gully	31° 40' 17" S	117° 43' 3" E	
Naroo Creek	25° 40' 29" S	125° 46' 59" E	
Narpunup Creek	34° 31' 34" S	117° 40' 46" E	
Narrakine Gully	33° 4' 21" S	117° 13' 9" E	
Narrikup Brook	34° 44' 46" S	117° 33' 36" E	
Narrina Creek	21° 10' 42" S	117° 23' 20" E	
Narrindup Creek	34° 12' 51" S	118° 14' 4" E	
Narrogin Brook	33° 2' 15" S	117° 18' 58" E	
Naughton Creek	24° 0' 25" S	114° 55' 33" E	
Naunenup Creek	34° 7' 19" S	118° 39' 42" E	
Nazareth Brook	31° 24' 24" S	116° 28' 42" E	
Neamutin Gully	32° 37' 18" S	117° 15' 43" E	
Ned Creek	31° 37' 54" S	116° 47' 21" E	
Neebannon Gully	33° 18' 33" S	117° 38' 49" E	
Needilup River	33° 50' 4" S	118° 50' 59" E	
Neerigen Brook	32° 8' 59" S	115° 58' 19" E	
Negrara Creek	26° 35' 1" S	120° 17' 57" E	
Negri Creek	26° 11' 53" S	119° 36' 45" E	
Negri River	17° 4' 13" S	128° 53' 12" E	
Neil Creek	16° 26' 43" S	126° 49' 43" E	
Neil Creek	16° 49' 20" S	127° 50' 29" E	
Nellie Creek	22° 1' 3" S	120° 38' 6" E	
Nellie Hayes Creek	27° 7' 42" S	123° 51' 55" E	
Nemile Creek	17° 49' 14" S	124° 27' 44" E	
Nemura Brook	30° 36' 14" S	116° 16' 10" E	
Nena Brook	31° 34' 37" S	116° 37' 54" E	
Nergaminon Creek	30° 20' 28" S	116° 4' 25" E	
Nerrima Creek	18° 8' 24" S	124° 3' 22" E	
Nestle Brae Creek	31° 57' 14" S	116° 1' 21" E	
Neurklegin Gully	33° 10' 37" S	117° 34' 17" E	
Neville Creek	16° 18' 49" S	124° 57' 47" E	
New River	33° 40' 7" S	115° 18' 16" E	
Newman Creek	24° 26' 30" S	115° 21' 59" E	
Newman Gully	33° 9' 49" S	117° 15' 35" E	
Newtown Creek	31° 13' 23" S	121° 38' 37" E	
Ngarrin Creek	20° 44' 0" S	120° 20' 58" E	
Ngatitjiri Creek	21° 52' 48" S	127° 53' 32" E	
Ngoollalah Creek	14° 50' 24" S	126° 19' 58" E	
Ngunda Creek	15° 11' 38" S	127° 39' 36" E	
Nhillabublica Creek	18° 7' 27" S	125° 51' 2" E	
Niagara Creek	29° 30' 46" S	121° 24' 27" E	
Nicholson River	17° 34' 5" S	128° 38' 43" E	
Nicker Creek	21° 32' 41" S	128° 44' 37" E	
Nickol River	20° 42' 49" S	116° 55' 24" E	
Nigallia Creek	25° 43' 18" S	115° 4' 38" E	
Nile Creek	34° 51' 27" S	117° 4' 18" E	
Niliamongup Creek	34° 1' 46" S	118° 10' 58" E	
Nimbedilling Brook	32° 28' 43" S	117° 2' 55" E	
Nimberline Creek	15° 57' 39" S	128° 1' 40" E	
Nimerry Creek	20° 57' 16" S	119° 57' 32" E	
Nimingarra Creek	21° 0' 0" S	117° 25' 57" E	
Nindilbillup Creek	33° 23' 10" S	120° 15' 45" E	
Ningerin Gully	31° 3' 13" S	116° 58' 43" E	
Ninterup Creek	34° 14' 0" S	118° 24' 53" E	
Nipper Creek	18° 42' 17" S	125° 45' 43" E	
Nipper Creek	22° 32' 48" S	114° 19' 15" E	
Nixon Creek	16° 18' 20" S	125° 31' 28" E	
Noneycup Creek	33° 33' 55" S	115° 49' 1" E	
Noolawayoo Creek	14° 40' 28" S	126° 22' 34" E	
Noombling Brook	32° 31' 7" S	117° 0' 28" E	
Noondathoona Creek	21° 27' 56" S	116° 46' 1" E	
Noondine Gully	30° 36' 48" S	116° 3' 36" E	
Noorubup Creek	34° 39' 13" S	118° 4' 3" E	
Nora Welstead Creek	26° 40' 52" S	123° 45' 19" E	
Norah Brook	33° 11' 21" S	115° 50' 59" E	
Noreena Creek	22° 14' 21" S	120° 36' 18" E	
Norilup Brook	33° 53' 18" S	115° 58' 1" E	
Norman Creek	17° 33' 52" S	124° 15' 51" E	
Norna Creek	34° 42' 34" S	117° 51' 17" E	
Norning Gully	32° 6' 12" S	116° 44' 35" E	
North Creek	16° 9' 2" S	126° 27' 44" E	
North Dandalup River	32° 35' 15" S	115° 53' 28" E	
Northern Gully	28° 45' 3" S	114° 54' 17" E	
Noseda Creek	13° 59' 57" S	126° 52' 53" E	
Nugget Creek	16° 20' 16" S	126° 55' 14" E	
Nuggets Creek	17° 23' 47" S	125° 54' 11" E	
Nuggety Gully	18° 16' 29" S	127° 51' 55" E	
Nuilee Nowra Creek	21° 41' 0" S	115° 58' 0" E	
Nulbunmeri Creek	15° 3' 30" S	127° 42' 39" E	
Nullagine River	20° 43' 13" S	120° 34' 13" E	
Nullilla Brook	31° 25' 7" S	115° 55' 23" E	
Nungabie Creek	23° 14' 2" S	115° 10' 22" E	
Nungunambulu Galuru Creek	15° 46' 10" S	124° 40' 19" E	
Nunyerry Creek	21° 24' 30" S	117° 56' 28" E	
Nyaania Creek	31° 55' 56" S	116° 3' 48" E	
Nyarra Creek	25° 48' 45" S	115° 21' 44" E	
Nyarrva Creek	16° 20' 21" S	123° 42' 35" E	
Nyerilup Creek	33° 50' 57" S	118° 48' 50" E	
Nyia Creek	15° 26' 11" S	127° 33' 18" E	
Nymphaea Creek	14° 50' 33" S	126° 55' 5" E	
Nyngan Brook	32° 47' 41" S	116° 0' 38" E	
Nyulasy Creek	18° 13' 31" S	128° 12' 32" E	
Nyunti Creek	20° 52' 36" S	127° 17' 36" E	

== O ==
Name	Latitude	Longitude	Remarks
O'Brien Creek	23° 13' 53" S	118° 4' 22" E	
O'Donnell Brook	16° 44' 4" S	128° 13' 2" E	
O'Donnell River	18° 20' 39" S	126° 35' 56" E	
O'Neill Brook	32° 30' 48" S	116° 11' 22" E	
Oakabella Creek	28° 31' 49" S	114° 21' 36" E	
Oakes Creek	15° 17' 35" S	129° 0' 0" E	
Oakley Brook	32° 38' 27" S	115° 52' 25" E	
Oakley Wash	24° 0' 47" S	115° 38' 23" E	
Oakover Creek	31° 39' 22" S	116° 42' 19" E	
Oakover River	20° 43' 46" S	120° 40' 33" E	
Obstinate Creek	21° 27' 54" S	118° 34' 29" E	
Octa Creek	16° 23' 42" S	128° 50' 8" E	
Old Doongan Creek	15° 19' 15" S	126° 36' 8" E	
Old Mill Gully	31° 56' 27" S	116° 7' 42" E	
Old Shaw Creek	21° 42' 40" S	119° 25' 23" E	
Old Station Creek	16° 39' 59" S	128° 49' 37" E	
Old Station Creek	15° 39' 8" S	128° 41' 35" E	
Old Stockyard Brook	33° 6' 47" S	116° 29' 33" E	
Oldfield River	33° 53' 13" S	120° 47' 8" E	
One Gum Creek	25° 52' 38" S	115° 30' 21" E	
One Tree Creek	25° 19' 25" S	115° 46' 46" E	
Ongarup Creek	34° 15' 25" S	118° 12' 24" E	
Ongerup Creek	33° 58' 30" S	118° 24' 32" E	
Onslow Creek	24° 25' 12" S	115° 29' 29" E	
Oobagooma Creek	16° 43' 14" S	124° 3' 36" E	
Oolrui Creek	16° 13' 10" S	126° 59' 55" E	
Oombalot Creek	16° 18' 6" S	125° 18' 11" E	
Oombiet Creek	16° 42' 21" S	125° 12' 11" E	
Ooranggatup Creek	34° 39' 40" S	117° 35' 26" E	
Opal Well Creek	26° 7' 49" S	118° 52' 14" E	
Opossum Spring Gully	33° 1' 58" S	116° 17' 36" E	
Orchid Creek	14° 51' 35" S	126° 49' 30" E	
Ord Creek	17° 20' 1" S	125° 52' 12" E	
Ord River	15° 12' 11" S	128° 11' 56" E	
Ornabullup Creek	34° 10' 27" S	117° 0' 12" E	
Orup Creek	34° 31' 18" S	117° 37' 46" E	
Osmand Creek	17° 9' 40" S	128° 50' 35" E	
Otho River	33° 16' 39" S	115° 59' 22" E	
Our Brook	34° 54' 34" S	116° 37' 21" E	
Our Creek	18° 31' 44" S	123° 26' 42" E	
Oven Creek	16° 51' 54" S	125° 25' 50" E	
Overflow Creek	19° 44' 20" S	127° 28' 22" E	
Oyster Creek	24° 55' 16" S	113° 39' 40" E	

== P ==
Name	Latitude	Longitude	Remarks
Packsaddle Creek	15° 48' 9" S	128° 40' 32" E	
Padawodi Creek	16° 27' 17" S	124° 19' 30" E	
Padbury Brook	33° 49' 13" S	115° 43' 52" E	
Padbury Gully	31° 5' 32" S	115° 51' 45" E	
Paddy Market Creek	21° 22' 43" S	119° 18' 22" E	
Paddy Spring Creek	16° 38' 5" S	126° 51' 54" E	
Padthureena Creek	20° 37' 45" S	117° 37' 35" E	
Palligup Creek	34° 2' 23" S	116° 56' 4" E	
Pallinup River	34° 27' 23" S	118° 52' 27" E	
Pallinup River South	33° 57' 48" S	117° 52' 2" E	
Palm Creek	18° 2' 18" S	127° 48' 26" E	
Palm Spring Creek	18° 32' 48" S	126° 17' 59" E	
Palm Well Creek	17° 58' 35" S	127° 48' 11" E	
Palmer Creek	15° 47' 56" S	127° 43' 16" E	
Palmer Creek	32° 49' 11" S	116° 58' 30" E	
Palmoondoora Creek	14° 49' 11" S	126° 40' 9" E	
Pandanus Creek	16° 16' 34" S	125° 36' 37" E	
Pandanus Creek	16° 50' 21" S	128° 41' 17" E	
Pandanus Creek	17° 49' 10" S	125° 55' 26" E	
Pangoor Creek	14° 48' 44" S	126° 36' 9" E	
Panton Creek	33° 36' 40" S	119° 47' 28" E	
Panton River	17° 42' 19" S	128° 27' 26" E	
Papata Creek	20° 49' 20" S	127° 11' 14" E	
Paper Collar Creek	34° 17' 57" S	118° 9' 42" E	
Papertalk Brook	29° 57' 37" S	120° 45' 14" E	
Paraburdoo Creek	23° 16' 40" S	117° 28' 36" E	
Paradise Creek	16° 14' 2" S	127° 42' 27" E	
Paradise Creek	33° 22' 42" S	115° 47' 8" E	
Paradise Creek	24° 30' 54" S	115° 26' 5" E	
Paradise Gully	28° 29' 57" S	114° 47' 16" E	
Parakatup Creek	34° 5' 15" S	118° 44' 41" E	
Parderoora River	16° 49' 56" S	124° 26' 36" E	
Pardoo Creek	20° 5' 6" S	119° 33' 17" E	
Parker Brook	34° 57' 56" S	117° 50' 53" E	
Parndia Creek	14° 23' 18" S	126° 39' 12" E	
Parrawiliwili Creek	20° 40' 55" S	117° 52' 7" E	
Parry Creek	15° 20' 2" S	128° 7' 33" E	
Parsons Creek	21° 2' 56" S	120° 55' 43" E	
Patrick River	15° 11' 13" S	127° 54' 19" E	
Patsy Creek	15° 59' 43" S	127° 45' 54" E	
Patsy Creek	16° 27' 27" S	126° 49' 16" E	
Paul Creek	34° 37' 39" S	117° 27' 28" E	
Paulyunerup Brook	34° 46' 30" S	117° 34' 59" E	
Payne Gully	20° 51' 11" S	117° 20' 19" E	
Pear Creek	17° 26' 30" S	124° 14' 15" E	
Pear Creek	16° 39' 50" S	128° 30' 41" E	
Pear Creek	20° 27' 56" S	119° 27' 47" E	
Pear Tree Creek	16° 48' 51" S	128° 13' 24" E	
Pearana Creek	21° 56' 28" S	121° 9' 49" E	
Pearson River	16° 12' 47" S	125° 30' 6" E	
Peartree Creek	16° 25' 57" S	126° 48' 41" E	
Peawah Creek	20° 50' 8" S	118° 1' 3" E	
Peawah River	20° 37' 11" S	117° 52' 49" E	
Peawanah Creek	21° 43' 16" S	117° 44' 56" E	
Pebble Mouse Creek	22° 56' 25" S	119° 9' 47" E	
Pedan Creek	29° 20' 4" S	117° 30' 56" E	
Peeatony Creek	20° 35' 20" S	117° 58' 18" E	
Peedamulla Creek	21° 40' 19" S	115° 37' 59" E	
Peedawarra Creek	24° 9' 48" S	116° 46' 9" E	
Peedillup Creek	34° 2' 24" S	118° 20' 47" E	
Peenebup Creek	34° 6' 8" S	118° 33' 56" E	
Peenebup Creek	34° 14' 12" S	118° 19' 8" E	
Peepingee Creek	22° 23' 59" S	115° 13' 26" E	
Peeralup Gully	34° 32' 28" S	117° 38' 46" E	
Peerambup Creek	34° 32' 20" S	117° 39' 57" E	
Peerup Meenup Creek	33° 59' 41" S	118° 23' 20" E	
Pegs Creek	20° 43' 41" S	116° 50' 11" E	
Peinellup Creek	34° 0' 24" S	117° 34' 25" E	
Pelican Creek	16° 20' 3" S	128° 6' 23" E	
Pell Creek	25° 13' 39" S	115° 31' 21" E	
Pendernup Creek	34° 24' 25" S	118° 43' 35" E	
Peniup Creek	34° 5' 58" S	118° 51' 12" E	
Penny Brook	31° 54' 20" S	116° 58' 40" E	
Pentecost River	15° 37' 3" S	127° 51' 8" E	
Perishing Creek	18° 22' 55" S	123° 11' 54" E	
Perkins Creek	33° 59' 19" S	119° 20' 42" E	
Perremillup Brook	34° 21' 5" S	116° 24' 27" E	
Perry Creek	24° 8' 19" S	118° 38' 46" E	
Perry Creek	23° 43' 59" S	119° 18' 59" E	
Perup River	34° 24' 3" S	116° 25' 25" E	
Petan Creek	29° 47' 32" S	115° 55' 38" E	
Peter Creek	21° 17' 38" S	115° 48' 50" E	
Petercarring Brook	32° 30' 0" S	117° 16' 54" E	
Petermarer Creek	20° 24' 38" S	118° 48' 22" E	
Peters Creek	34° 21' 2" S	119° 18' 54" E	
Peters Spring Creek	16° 12' 52" S	128° 57' 57" E	
Petrophassa Creek	14° 39' 46" S	127° 1' 18" E	
Pheasant Creek	16° 13' 29" S	127° 41' 57" E	
Phillips Brook	34° 55' 17" S	117° 50' 41" E	
Phillips Brook	31° 27' 33" S	116° 25' 50" E	
Phillips River	33° 53' 7" S	120° 4' 28" E	
Piccaninny Creek	17° 40' 36" S	128° 28' 40" E	
Pickano Creek	28° 54' 8" S	116° 34' 8" E	
Pickering Brook	31° 58' 49" S	116° 11' 18" E	
Pickering Creek	22° 58' 40" S	120° 26' 47" E	
Pidgeoning Creek	31° 1' 37" S	116° 18' 40" E	
Piesse Gully	31° 57' 1" S	116° 4' 43" E	
Pigeon Creek	17° 56' 44" S	125° 46' 40" E	
Piker Creek	21° 33' 22" S	116° 19' 21" E	
Pilbaddy Creek	21° 29' 19" S	118° 29' 19" E	
Pilbara Creek	21° 13' 45" S	118° 24' 2" E	
Pilgangoora Creek	21° 2' 29" S	118° 50' 57" E	
Pilgonaman Creek	22° 11' 41" S	113° 51' 14" E	
Pilinya Creek	20° 49' 27" S	118° 42' 36" E	
Pillingini Creek	21° 10' 39" S	117° 23' 30" E	
Pimbyana Creek	24° 0' 55" S	116° 16' 40" E	
Pinarra Creek	22° 38' 39" S	116° 46' 6" E	
Pinch Gully	33° 58' 16" S	115° 45' 45" E	
Pinchin Gully	33° 4' 58" S	118° 18' 51" E	
Pindabarn Creek	26° 13' 5" S	117° 13' 44" E	
Pindabarranuna Creek	20° 56' 14" S	120° 12' 23" E	
Pindalla Creek	21° 32' 2" S	115° 31' 27" E	
Pindan Creek	16° 9' 53" S	126° 27' 6" E	
Pindathuna Creek	28° 16' 24" S	116° 36' 58" E	
Pine Creek	17° 15' 9" S	127° 27' 45" E	
Pinga Creek	21° 26' 52" S	118° 30' 35" E	
Pingamup Gully	33° 51' 20" S	118° 53' 27" E	
Pingandy Creek	23° 55' 44" S	117° 53' 2" E	
Pingarra Creek	26° 20' 45" S	116° 39' 21" E	
Pinjalup Creek	34° 15' 56" S	117° 26' 10" E	
Pink Eye Gully	34° 3' 54" S	116° 4' 27" E	
Pink Hills Creek	24° 28' 30" S	116° 45' 0" E	
Pinnacle Creek	18° 45' 55" S	125° 55' 27" E	
Pinnacle Creek	21° 43' 1" S	119° 28' 43" E	
Pinpin Creek	20° 24' 53" S	119° 13' 22" E	
Pipe Clay Gully	34° 1' 39" S	115° 42' 50" E	
Pish Creek	18° 29' 39" S	128° 29' 51" E	
Pitt Brook	31° 55' 13" S	116° 53' 38" E	
Pitta Creek	15° 51' 2" S	125° 38' 54" E	
Placid Creek	13° 59' 19" S	126° 48' 43" E	
Plain Creek	16° 54' 49" S	125° 16' 41" E	
Plain Creek	15° 59' 26" S	126° 28' 16" E	
Planigale Creek	14° 44' 2" S	126° 54' 1" E	
Plover Creek	16° 53' 35" S	125° 35' 15" E	
Pocanmaya Creek	29° 56' 34" S	116° 12' 58" E	
Point Torment Creek	17° 1' 14" S	123° 39' 43" E	
Poison Creek	28° 21' 27" S	120° 33' 11" E	
Poison Gully	32° 9' 34" S	116° 8' 53" E	
Poison Gully	31° 56' 59" S	115° 59' 23" E	
Police Creek	21° 27' 17" S	120° 22' 20" E	
Pollard Brook	33° 18' 29" S	116° 16' 51" E	
Pollard Creek	21° 30' 45" S	116° 43' 38" E	
Ponai Creek	14° 32' 35" S	126° 47' 21" E	
Ponton Creek	31° 7' 15" S	124° 21' 27" E	
Poonagarra Creek	22° 8' 26" S	120° 42' 48" E	
Poonemerlarra Creek	22° 36' 54" S	122° 21' 32" E	
Poorginup Gully	34° 34' 10" S	116° 46' 54" E	
Poorkana Creek	28° 3' 3" S	122° 49' 36" E	
Popes Nose Creek	20° 38' 12" S	117° 10' 52" E	
Portland River	21° 29' 5" S	116° 49' 47" E	
Post And Rail Gully	33° 52' 42" S	115° 51' 28" E	
Pot Pot Creek	21° 41' 32" S	116° 15' 14" E	
Pothole Creek	18° 8' 23" S	125° 49' 48" E	
Poulton Creek	16° 25' 31" S	123° 59' 33" E	
Poverty Creek	20° 42' 11" S	117° 57' 22" E	
Poverty Gully	18° 16' 16" S	127° 52' 9" E	
Powdar Creek	21° 21' 45" S	118° 25' 37" E	
Pownall Creek	20° 49' 59" S	127° 40' 59" E	
Poynton Creek	22° 32' 54" S	122° 23' 34" E	
Preston River	33° 19' 19" S	115° 40' 32" E	
Preston River South	33° 31' 49" S	116° 3' 22" E	
Pretty Pool Creek	20° 18' 46" S	118° 38' 15" E	
Prices Creek	18° 41' 1" S	125° 51' 45" E	
Priest Creek	31° 52' 42" S	116° 3' 43" E	
Prince Regent River	15° 27' 6" S	125° 4' 7" E	
Pritchard Creek	23° 53' 16" S	115° 39' 56" E	
Pronga-marie Creek	14° 38' 32" S	126° 46' 17" E	
Prospect Creek	17° 55' 46" S	127° 51' 34" E	
Prospector Creek	21° 9' 36" S	119° 52' 9" E	
Proudfoot Creek	15° 25' 16" S	126° 29' 58" E	
Prye Brook	30° 28' 26" S	116° 4' 58" E	
Pumpkin Lookout Creek	15° 49' 37" S	128° 36' 10" E	
Puppy Dog Creek	16° 37' 7" S	126° 53' 7" E	
Pussy Creek	15° 50' 3" S	126° 47' 32" E	

== Q ==
Name	Latitude	Longitude	Remarks
Quabing Gully	33° 22' 54" S	117° 6' 18" E	
Quagamirup Brook	33° 59' 40" S	116° 3' 23" E	
Quail Creek	15° 42' 34" S	125° 26' 6" E	
Quailing Gully	31° 47' 43" S	117° 3' 43" E	
Quangelup Creek	34° 37' 35" S	117° 35' 36" E	
Quaradup Gully	34° 30' 37" S	117° 36' 15" E	
Quartz Creek	34° 3' 36" S	116° 27' 58" E	
Quenda Creek	31° 56' 42" S	116° 2' 19" E	
Quickip River	34° 55' 33" S	117° 21' 47" E	
Quin Brook	31° 19' 0" S	115° 41' 17" E	
Quinine Gully	32° 8' 30" S	116° 11' 16" E	
Quininup Brook	33° 44' 53" S	114° 59' 22" E	
Quinninup Brook	34° 28' 26" S	116° 15' 40" E	
Quintallup Brook	34° 23' 8" S	116° 20' 49" E	
Quintattup Gully	34° 21' 18" S	116° 20' 28" E	
Quongup Brook	33° 51' 56" S	115° 52' 2" E	

== See also ==
- Geography of Western Australia
