= List of watercourses in Western Australia, W–Z =

Western Australia has many watercourses with gazetted names, including rivers, streams, brooks, creeks, gullies, anabranches and backwaters.

This list is complete with respect to the 1996 Gazetteer of Australia. Dubious names have been checked against the online 2004 data, and in all cases confirmed correct. However, if any watercourses have been gazetted or deleted since 1996, this list does not reflect these changes. Strictly speaking, Australian place names are gazetted in capital letters only; the names in this list have been converted to mixed case in accordance with normal capitalisation conventions. Locations are as gazetted; some watercourses may extend over long distances.

== W ==
Name	Latitude	Longitude	Remarks
Wabli Creek	24° 51' 43" S	116° 17' 45" E	
Wackilina Creek	22° 19' 14" S	117° 36' 55" E	
Waddy Spring Creek	17° 31' 15" S	127° 19' 43" E	
Wade Creek	14° 13' 51" S	126° 17' 54" E	
Wade Creek	17° 13' 35" S	128° 38' 32" E	
Wade Gully	34° 7' 54" S	116° 58' 56" E	
Wadjekanup River	34° 1' 32" S	117° 36' 25" E	
Wadra Creek	22° 15' 19" S	120° 24' 58" E	
Wagerup Brook	32° 56' 5" S	115° 54' 15" E	
Waggon Creek	15° 20' 33" S	128° 36' 5" E	
Wahkinup Brook	33° 53' 14" S	116° 44' 9" E	
Waighinunderup Brook	34° 20' 1" S	116° 26' 43" E	
Waldeck Brook	32° 46' 11" S	116° 4' 39" E	
Walellemining Brook	32° 38' 51" S	117° 33' 39" E	
Walgamungun Creek	16° 42' 59" S	125° 26' 49" E	
Walgunya Creek	21° 2' 24" S	120° 35' 52" E	
Walimbulimba Creek	15° 9' 23" S	127° 50' 46" E	
Walja Creek	27° 56' 24" S	122° 58' 9" E	
Walkabubba Creek	25° 21' 36" S	115° 30' 32" E	
Wall Creek	22° 1' 45" S	118° 37' 31" E	
Wallanaring Creek	21° 22' 17" S	116° 9' 17" E	
Wallarda Brook	28° 12' 15" S	115° 29' 46" E	
Wallering Brook	31° 17' 59" S	115° 48' 47" E	
Walls Creek	16° 59' 20" S	127° 37' 18" E	
Walls Creek	17° 3' 11" S	127° 37' 23" E	
Wallurally Creek	30° 35' 56" S	116° 10' 4" E	
Walmar Creek	15° 20' 43" S	127° 57' 5" E	
Walmunna Creek	16° 24' 54" S	125° 35' 12" E	
Walpole River	34° 58' 55" S	116° 43' 0" E	Falls into the Walpole Inlet at Walpole
Walpole River East	34° 57' 38" S	116° 42' 12" E	
Walsall Brook	33° 46' 14" S	115° 21' 25" E	
Walsh Creek	17° 9' 15" S	125° 43' 42" E	
Walters Brook	31° 56' 34" S	115° 52' 49" E	
Waltha Woora Creek	21° 34' 4" S	121° 8' 36" E	
Wanan Creek	14° 15' 41" S	126° 37' 37" E	
Wanda Wanda Creek	31° 21' 58" S	121° 35' 32" E	
Wandarry Creek	23° 26' 21" S	117° 9' 36" E	
Wandering Brook	32° 45' 40" S	116° 40' 53" E	
Wandery Creek	25° 44' 34" S	117° 56' 34" E	
Wandin Creek	28° 26' 58" S	115° 11' 28" E	
Wandinny Creek	24° 19' 48" S	114° 32' 2" E	
Wandoo Creek	31° 50' 30" S	115° 59' 29" E	
Wandoorangoo Creek	25° 48' 55" S	122° 43' 6" E	
Wandy Wandy Creek	21° 19' 46" S	121° 3' 10" E	
Wanerup Brook	33° 47' 57" S	115° 57' 5" E	
Wanery Brook	30° 44' 2" S	116° 0' 15" E	
Wangeling Gully	33° 14' 9" S	117° 5' 27" E	
Wanggannoo Creek	27° 17' 14" S	121° 20' 37" E	
Wannabooline Creek	26° 4' 27" S	122° 2' 59" E	
Wannering Brook	32° 7' 32" S	116° 57' 35" E	
Wannery Creek	22° 46' 39" S	115° 43' 0" E	
Wanwindup Gully	34° 2' 13" S	117° 1' 16" E	
Wapet Creek	22° 15' 22" S	114° 4' 52" E	
Warada River	16° 13' 31" S	123° 37' 35" E	
Waralla Creek	23° 34' 26" S	115° 36' 47" E	
Warambur Creek	15° 11' 57" S	127° 45' 51" E	
Waranine Brook	32° 21' 34" S	116° 49' 2" E	
Warawong Creek	31° 51' 22" S	116° 48' 13" E	
Warburton Creek	26° 4' 41" S	126° 35' 43" E	
Wardelocking Creek	33° 12' 38" S	117° 13' 36" E	
Wardering Brook	32° 48' 32" S	117° 17' 11" E	
Wargoorloop Branch	32° 34' 59" S	115° 45' 49" E	
Wariin Brook	31° 56' 19" S	116° 20' 39" E	
Warilpra Creek	24° 56' 45" S	128° 40' 59" E	
Warkelup Brook	33° 48' 33" S	117° 15' 25" E	
Warne River	29° 19' 43" S	118° 2' 53" E	
Warperup Creek	34° 6' 13" S	118° 11' 12" E	
Warra Warringa Creek	25° 48' 3" S	115° 43' 4" E	
Warralling Creek	31° 57' 0" S	117° 29' 32" E	
Warralong Creek	20° 55' 15" S	119° 38' 25" E	
Warramboo Creek	21° 36' 42" S	115° 45' 20" E	
Warranine Brook	31° 43' 49" S	116° 31' 59" E	
Warrawanda Creek	23° 16' 9" S	121° 49' 17" E	
Warren River	34° 36' 30" S	115° 49' 57" E	
Warrengidging Brook	31° 43' 57" S	117° 27' 21" E	
Warrening Gully	33° 2' 49" S	116° 33' 16" E	
Warri Creek	21° 28' 20" S	128° 8' 47" E	
Warri Warri Creek	21° 35' 55" S	121° 9' 6" E	
Warrina Creek	21° 33' 24" S	116° 59' 55" E	
Warringali Creek	15° 12' 4" S	127° 41' 56" E	
Warringillber Creek	15° 7' 40" S	127° 48' 3" E	
Warungup Brook	34° 6' 31" S	117° 1' 50" E	
Warwaberup Gully	34° 23' 29" S	116° 27' 59" E	
Wasbedine Gully	32° 58' 58" S	117° 36' 37" E	
Wash Pool Gully	33° 18' 23" S	117° 39' 41" E	
Washpool Brook	31° 15' 34" S	116° 49' 29" E	
Watch Point Creek	23° 6' 30" S	120° 50' 23" E	
Waterfall Creek	16° 51' 4" S	128° 27' 42" E	
Waterfall Creek	27° 23' 17" S	117° 19' 16" E	
Waterfall Creek	34° 2' 27" S	116° 24' 52" E	
Waterfall Creek	33° 20' 50" S	115° 50' 15" E	
Waterfall Gully	33° 31' 21" S	114° 52' 0" E	
Waterfly Creek	16° 25' 49" S	123° 10' 53" E	
Waterhole Gully	33° 58' 54" S	116° 17' 37" E	
Watermailling Brook	32° 30' 25" S	117° 1' 12" E	
Watermelon Creek	24° 27' 13" S	114° 32' 43" E	
Watermelon Creek	16° 42' 5" S	127° 2' 41" E	
Waters Brook	31° 30' 32" S	116° 26' 50" E	
Waters Creek	22° 59' 33" S	122° 21' 38" E	
Watery River	18° 2' 12" S	127° 10' 52" E	
Watrara Creek	22° 31' 1" S	122° 5' 19" E	
Watt Creek	26° 47' 10" S	126° 8' 50" E	
Wattamulga Creek	27° 58' 59" S	116° 31' 58" E	
Wattening Brook	31° 19' 34" S	116° 31' 2" E	
Wattle Creek	21° 1' 59" S	118° 2' 59" E	
Wattle Creek	33° 51' 44" S	116° 48' 42" E	
Wattle Hollow Brook	32° 47' 24" S	116° 21' 47" E	
Wattle Spring Creek	19° 12' 38" S	126° 3' 43" E	
Waulfe Creek	27° 46' 48" S	125° 52' 39" E	
Waychinicup River	34° 53' 33" S	118° 19' 57" E	
Weam Gully	32° 14' 50" S	117° 3' 10" E	
Weaner Creek	15° 49' 31" S	128° 34' 26" E	
Weanerjungup Creek	33° 53' 5" S	123° 23' 57" E	
Weaners Creek	16° 35' 35" S	128° 58' 48" E	
Wearup Brook	33° 52' 2" S	117° 30' 12" E	
Wedderburn Brook	33° 16' 6" S	115° 50' 24" E	
Wedding Brook	34° 52' 21" S	116° 45' 8" E	
Weedarra Creek	25° 39' 35" S	116° 42' 13" E	
Weeks Brook	33° 1' 11" S	115° 52' 47" E	
Weeli Wolli Creek	22° 30' 24" S	119° 13' 19" E	
Weelumurra Creek	21° 51' 29" S	117° 37' 40" E	
Weenup Creek	33° 56' 59" S	117° 11' 48" E	
Weerier Creek	28° 11' 54" S	117° 23' 34" E	
Weerinoogudda Gully	27° 26' 45" S	114° 21' 58" E	
Welcome Creek	23° 4' 15" S	122° 20' 58" E	
Weld River	34° 49' 33" S	116° 35' 27" E	
Wellesley Creek	33° 5' 52" S	115° 53' 14" E	
Wellesley River	33° 14' 57" S	115° 45' 31" E	
Wenmillia Creek	28° 28' 32" S	115° 27' 48" E	
Wesley Spring Creek	16° 48' 32" S	128° 26' 18" E	
West Bay Creek	34° 17' 8" S	115° 8' 9" E	
West Creek	24° 40' 57" S	118° 13' 49" E	
West Creek	20° 19' 21" S	118° 33' 34" E	
West River	33° 47' 15" S	119° 57' 16" E	
West Side Creek	24° 55' 58" S	113° 40' 6" E	
West Yule River	20° 30' 49" S	117° 59' 29" E	
West Yule River	21° 42' 37" S	118° 38' 4" E	
Western Creek	21° 4' 38" S	117° 7' 46" E	
Western Creek	23° 26' 19" S	119° 46' 25" E	
Western Creek	21° 17' 59" S	116° 33' 59" E	
Western Shaw River	21° 53' 54" S	119° 21' 58" E	
Westlington Brook	33° 46' 37" S	116° 1' 47" E	
Westralian Gully	33° 52' 40" S	116° 4' 47" E	
Westwood Creek	14° 48' 4" S	128° 27' 53" E	
Whaleback Creek	23° 21' 41" S	119° 49' 23" E	
Wheelbarrow Creek	16° 3' 6" S	128° 25' 46" E	
Wheelo Creek	25° 24' 32" S	117° 10' 57" E	
Whela Creek	26° 15' 46" S	116° 36' 14" E	
Whim Creek	20° 47' 11" S	117° 47' 50" E	
Whiskey Creek	16° 11' 0" S	126° 28' 3" E	
Whisky Brook	32° 51' 42" S	115° 57' 25" E	
Whistlepipe Gully	31° 59' 7" S	116° 1' 4" E	
White Bull Creek	16° 35' 54" S	125° 26' 35" E	
White Gum Gully	31° 47' 6" S	116° 18' 43" E	
White Mountain Creek	17° 16' 13" S	128° 54' 23" E	
Whitegum Creek	16° 17' 18" S	126° 59' 22" E	
Whitewater Creek	16° 25' 39" S	127° 9' 50" E	
Whitfield Brook	31° 10' 59" S	115° 45' 55" E	
Whitlock Creek	24° 53' 30" S	113° 38' 33" E	
Wicherina Brook	28° 43' 12" S	115° 1' 50" E	
Wickham Creek	22° 1' 0" S	120° 36' 56" E	
Widgiemooltha Creek	31° 29' 7" S	121° 34' 57" E	
Wild Dog Creek	16° 44' 19" S	128° 52' 50" E	
Wild Dog Creek	22° 7' 38" S	119° 58' 13" E	
Wild Dog Creek	17° 48' 39" S	127° 49' 19" E	
Wild Goose Creek	15° 34' 5" S	128° 20' 48" E	
Wild Horse Creek	33° 15' 17" S	116° 45' 50" E	
Wilgarra Gully	32° 39' 17" S	116° 33' 10" E	
Wilgarrup River	34° 22' 37" S	116° 19' 54" E	
Wilgerup Creek	33° 55' 5" S	118° 58' 18" E	
Wilgie Creek	32° 34' 29" S	115° 48' 38" E	
Wilgin Creek	30° 33' 43" S	116° 10' 14" E	
Wilkinson Creek	16° 52' 53" S	125° 11' 44" E	
Willaraddie Creek	23° 51' 11" S	115° 11' 36" E	
Willemmenup Gully	33° 58' 19" S	117° 56' 7" E	
Willemmenup Gully	34° 0' 25" S	117° 56' 54" E	
William Creek	34° 22' 56" S	116° 17' 33" E	
Williams Gully	33° 22' 50" S	115° 55' 25" E	
Williams River	32° 58' 34" S	116° 23' 51" E	
Willie Creek	17° 46' 3" S	122° 13' 0" E	
Willimott Creek	29° 4' 46" S	115° 24' 37" E	
Wills Creek	17° 32' 22" S	128° 2' 53" E	
Willy Willy Creek	18° 43' 24" S	126° 55' 6" E	
Willyun Creek	34° 38' 2" S	118° 34' 53" E	
Willyung Creek	34° 56' 17" S	117° 54' 1" E	
Wilson Brook	32° 31' 50" S	116° 2' 13" E	
Wilson Creek	17° 25' 21" S	128° 2' 13" E	
Wilson Creek	28° 36' 41" S	120° 57' 15" E	
Wilson Creek	15° 34' 20" S	127° 46' 48" E	
Wilson River	16° 47' 40" S	128° 16' 30" E	
Wilsons Creek	18° 19' 2" S	123° 43' 28" E	
Wilyabrup Brook	33° 47' 26" S	114° 59' 49" E	
Windich Brook	28° 52' 6" S	122° 22' 49" E	
Windidda Creek	26° 26' 9" S	122° 59' 22" E	
Windywindina Creek	22° 0' 21" S	120° 35' 26" E	
Wingarup Gully	34° 25' 16" S	116° 35' 10" E	
Winjardie Creek	30° 23' 15" S	115° 31' 40" E	
Winmar Creek	23° 59' 49" S	115° 59' 31" E	
Winnejup Brook	33° 58' 49" S	116° 18' 55" E	
Winter Brook	32° 35' 11" S	115° 49' 56" E	
Wirara Creek	18° 34' 10" S	126° 33' 5" E	
Wire Creek	17° 35' 59" S	128° 39' 13" E	
Wireless Creek	17° 47' 10" S	127° 6' 12" E	
Withnell Creek	21° 39' 13" S	119° 44' 2" E	
Withnell Creek	21° 27' 42" S	116° 58' 39" E	
Wittecarra Gully	27° 44' 37" S	114° 9' 7" E	
Woilyungup River	33° 44' 28" S	117° 28' 29" E	
Wokalup Creek	33° 6' 52" S	115° 54' 23" E	
Wolfe Creek	19° 15' 57" S	127° 46' 54" E	
Wolfe Creek East	19° 1' 36" S	127° 44' 9" E	
Woljenup Creek	33° 55' 43" S	116° 2' 26" E	
Wolooer Creek	17° 58' 55" S	127° 9' 49" E	
Womaramara Creek	15° 48' 31" S	125° 36' 20" E	
Wombarella Creek	17° 15' 10" S	124° 43' 42" E	
Wongamine Brook	31° 37' 56" S	116° 38' 18" E	
Wongarrie Creek	24° 6' 2" S	115° 37' 55" E	
Wongawol Creek	26° 13' 25" S	122° 6' 38" E	
Wongerup Creek	34° 45' 27" S	118° 26' 15" E	
Wongida Creek	22° 48' 45" S	115° 42' 27" E	
Wongoondy Creek	28° 40' 8" S	115° 22' 55" E	
Wonnenup Brook	34° 12' 51" S	117° 6' 13" E	
Wood Belly Creek	16° 20' 3" S	128° 38' 21" E	
Wood Creek	21° 36' 10" S	119° 33' 33" E	
Wood River	16° 36' 58" S	127° 6' 1" E	
Woodah Weedah Creek	25° 58' 24" S	122° 56' 59" E	
Woodbridge Creek	31° 52' 35" S	116° 1' 10" E	
Woodburn Creek	34° 6' 55" S	115° 48' 53" E	
Woodcock Creek	24° 26' 31" S	115° 21' 58" E	
Woodebulling Brook	32° 28' 53" S	117° 32' 42" E	
Woodenbillup Brook	33° 58' 45" S	116° 41' 14" E	
Woodenup Creek	33° 27' 24" S	120° 10' 5" E	
Wooderarrung River	28° 22' 34" S	115° 22' 9" E	
Woodhouse River	15° 43' 42" S	126° 17' 49" E	
Woodie Woodie Creek	21° 38' 18" S	121° 8' 54" E	
Woodlands Brook	33° 47' 3" S	115° 2' 31" E	
Woodlupine Brook	31° 59' 46" S	115° 59' 27" E	
Woodward Creek	17° 59' 8" S	127° 52' 19" E	
Woogalong Creek	27° 27' 34" S	116° 37' 40" E	
Woojalong Brook	27° 48' 48" S	116° 26' 21" E	
Woolaga Creek	29° 12' 32" S	115° 35' 14" E	
Woolaganup Creek	34° 14' 42" S	118° 16' 13" E	
Woolbarka Brook	27° 49' 13" S	116° 25' 7" E	
Woolkabin Gully	33° 22' 30" S	117° 38' 10" E	
Woolonwarra Creek	18° 40' 45" S	123° 38' 30" E	
Woolybutt Creek	16° 49' 41" S	125° 41' 43" E	
Woomera Creek	17° 0' 8" S	125° 28' 8" E	
Woonana Gully	27° 33' 43" S	114° 16' 45" E	
Woonjah Creek	14° 52' 56" S	126° 23' 37" E	
Woorakin Creek	15° 3' 15" S	126° 45' 5" E	
Wooramel River	25° 52' 50" S	114° 15' 4" E	
Wooramel River North	25° 47' 51" S	115° 59' 17" E	
Woormenning Gully	31° 18' 30" S	116° 45' 40" E	
Wooroloo Brook	31° 44' 5" S	116° 4' 24" E	
Wooroo Creek	21° 38' 7" S	115° 56' 22" E	
Wootha Wootha Creek	21° 58' 43" S	121° 12' 49" E	
Wootra Brook	31° 17' 36" S	116° 6' 42" E	
Woppinbie Creek	14° 9' 39" S	126° 30' 44" E	
Worallgarook Branch	32° 34' 36" S	115° 45' 49" E	
Woregong Brook	31° 47' 26" S	116° 45' 53" E	
Worsley River	33° 20' 23" S	116° 1' 16" E	
Wowra Brook	31° 20' 24" S	115° 52' 58" E	
Woyerling Creek	32° 26' 53" S	117° 28' 38" E	
Wright Brook	32° 6' 20" S	116° 0' 50" E	
Wulumara Creek	15° 34' 42" S	125° 38' 27" E	
Wundabiniring Brook	31° 56' 1" S	116° 31' 19" E	
Wungong Brook	32° 10' 3" S	115° 58' 7" E	
Wurrungnulling Creek	32° 42' 3" S	117° 14' 57" E	
Wy-uda Creek	25° 31' 3" S	120° 12' 24" E	
Wyadup Brook	33° 40' 47" S	114° 59' 45" E	
Wyanning Creek	32° 44' 0" S	117° 11' 7" E	
Wydgee Creek	28° 47' 35" S	117° 50' 45" E	
Wyndham River	25° 4' 14" S	115° 27' 39" E	
Wyndham Wash	25° 4' 2" S	115° 27' 28" E	
Wynne Creek	23° 17' 11" S	115° 22' 57" E	
Wyulda Creek	15° 26' 9" S	125° 36' 46" E	

== Y ==
Name	Latitude	Longitude	Remarks
Yaddemooga Creek	26° 22' 18" S	117° 1' 18" E	
Yadgena Brook	30° 39' 58" S	116° 6' 44" E	
Yadgymurrin Creek	25° 26' 22" S	119° 58' 21" E	
Yaginol Creek	23° 39' 10" S	116° 10' 12" E	
Yagobiddy Creek	20° 58' 38" S	116° 10' 39" E	
Yakamia Creek	34° 59' 11" S	117° 56' 15" E	
Yalal Creek	25° 44' 3" S	122° 28' 16" E	
Yalgamine Creek	27° 30' 42" S	115° 14' 35" E	
Yalgar River	25° 56' 43" S	117° 34' 37" E	
Yalgardup Brook	33° 57' 20" S	115° 3' 1" E	
Yallagibbie Creek	26° 14' 6" S	117° 15' 18" E	
Yallawun Creek	28° 19' 16" S	119° 19' 1" E	
Yallet Creek	16° 53' 47" S	122° 33' 43" E	
Yallingup Brook	34° 50' 7" S	117° 56' 19" E	
Yallingup Brook	33° 38' 15" S	115° 3' 32" E	
Yallmunging Brook	31° 24' 16" S	116° 52' 1" E	
Yallobup Creek	33° 55' 55" S	120° 21' 39" E	
Yalup Brook	32° 54' 18" S	115° 54' 1" E	
Yalyal Brook	31° 30' 54" S	115° 58' 26" E	
Yamballup Creek	34° 39' 12" S	117° 34' 29" E	
Yammadery Creek	21° 31' 52" S	115° 26' 7" E	
Yammara Creek	29° 22' 49" S	117° 41' 44" E	
Yammera Creek	21° 54' 28" S	118° 6' 54" E	
Yandagooge Creek	22° 9' 21" S	122° 7' 7" E	
Yandicoogina Creek	21° 5' 39" S	119° 59' 24" E	
Yandicoogina Creek	22° 47' 9" S	119° 13' 52" E	
Yandinilling Brook	32° 1' 25" S	117° 2' 39" E	
Yandthangunna Creek	25° 17' 21" S	118° 46' 17" E	
Yanga Creek	28° 47' 30" S	115° 25' 47" E	
Yangedine Brook	31° 58' 17" S	116° 48' 44" E	
Yangibana Creek	23° 53' 21" S	116° 7' 21" E	
Yannarie River	22° 30' 5" S	114° 45' 57" E	
Yannarie River South	23° 15' 8" S	115° 11' 41" E	
Yannery River	21° 0' 25" S	116° 48' 40" E	
Yanyare River	20° 49' 35" S	116° 26' 20" E	
Yarawindah Brook	31° 7' 2" S	116° 11' 41" E	
Yard Creek	15° 23' 4" S	128° 56' 59" E	
Yarder Gully	28° 11' 32" S	114° 24' 0" E	
Yardi River	21° 35' 25" S	115° 19' 43" E	
Yardie Creek	22° 19' 28" S	113° 48' 32" E	
Yardoogarra Creek	18° 14' 9" S	122° 12' 18" E	
Yardup Creek	34° 9' 44" S	118° 14' 43" E	
Yarlarweelor Creek	25° 7' 15" S	118° 2' 42" E	
Yarlin Gully	33° 18' 45" S	117° 36' 20" E	
Yarling Brook	32° 39' 51" S	117° 33' 13" E	
Yarloo Creek	27° 53' 17" S	120° 1' 57" E	
Yarmalup Creek	34° 2' 29" S	118° 49' 14" E	
Yarna Creek	15° 11' 38" S	127° 44' 50" E	
Yarra Yarra Creek	25° 57' 12" S	115° 57' 3" E	
Yarrabar Creek	15° 39' 26" S	127° 52' 12" E	
Yarragil Brook	32° 48' 21" S	116° 6' 45" E	
Yarramony Brook	31° 29' 16" S	116° 42' 48" E	
Yarrar Creek	15° 5' 4" S	127° 41' 39" E	
Yatheroo Brook	30° 47' 47" S	115° 42' 35" E	
Yeardup Brook	34° 15' 15" S	116° 13' 54" E	
Yearling Creek	15° 50' 37" S	128° 29' 56" E	
Yeeda River	17° 30' 15" S	123° 38' 31" E	
Yellow Waterhole Creek	18° 35' 3" S	128° 37' 48" E	
Yellow Waterhole Creek	15° 37' 1" S	128° 23' 49" E	
Yeneena Creek	22° 24' 38" S	121° 35' 6" E	
Yennedine Brook	32° 20' 39" S	116° 47' 53" E	
Yeo Creek	28° 7' 55" S	124° 31' 0" E	
Yerilla Creek	29° 24' 19" S	121° 53' 49" E	
Yerraminnup River	34° 15' 4" S	116° 27' 4" E	
Yerritup Creek	33° 45' 21" S	121° 8' 4" E	
Yilgalong Creek	21° 2' 16" S	120° 55' 9" E	
Yilliminning River	33° 2' 12" S	117° 25' 44" E	
Yinaringgai Creek	14° 18' 57" S	126° 39' 15" E	
Yoolo Creek	14° 59' 44" S	126° 14' 17" E	
Yoonguru Creek	16° 14' 5" S	123° 37' 11" E	
Youahlin Creek	32° 1' 30" S	118° 10' 13" E	
Yoularun Creek	16° 34' 52" S	125° 28' 35" E	
Youndegin Creek	31° 38' 42" S	117° 18' 35" E	
Young Creek	14° 29' 49" S	126° 41' 58" E	
Young River	33° 48' 35" S	121° 10' 35" E	
Youngs Creek	15° 8' 55" S	125° 50' 22" E	
Youwanjela Creek	15° 43' 52" S	125° 28' 43" E	
Yow Creek	14° 55' 30" S	128° 43' 14" E	
Yownama Creek	21° 16' 27" S	121° 3' 20" E	
Yoygin Creek	15° 12' 15" S	127° 40' 29" E	
Yulakin Gully	33° 0' 50" S	117° 32' 21" E	
Yulawarra Creek	23° 22' 0" S	116° 29' 30" E	
Yule Brook	32° 2' 7" S	115° 56' 55" E	
Yule River	20° 24' 16" S	118° 11' 39" E	
Yulgan Brook	31° 16' 20" S	116° 28' 31" E	
Yunderup Branch	32° 35' 22" S	115° 45' 41" E	
Yundinna Creek	20° 37' 55" S	119° 56' 28" E	
Yuraddagi River	16° 15' 25" S	123° 36' 35" E	

== Z ==
Name	Latitude	Longitude	Remarks
Zulu Creek	21° 0' 29" S	120° 16' 45" E	

== See also ==
- Geography of Western Australia
