= List of watercourses in Western Australia, E–H =

Western Australia has many watercourses with gazetted names, including rivers, streams, brooks, creeks, gullies, anabranches and backwaters.

This list is complete with respect to the 1996 Gazetteer of Australia. Dubious names have been checked against the online 2004 data, and in all cases confirmed correct. However, if any watercourses have been gazetted or deleted since 1996, this list does not reflect these changes. Strictly speaking, Australian place names are gazetted in capital letters only; the names in this list have been converted to mixed case in accordance with normal capitalisation conventions. Locations are as gazetted; some watercourses may extend over long distances.

== E ==
Name	Latitude	Longitude	Remarks
Eadine Gully	31° 43' 25" S	116° 31' 56" E	
Eagle Creek	28° 57' 49" S	115° 31' 7" E	
Eagle Hawk Gully	16° 57' 50" S	125° 33' 19" E	
Eardley Creek	34° 43' 1" S	116° 11' 19" E	
East Brook	34° 27' 52" S	116° 1' 49" E	
East Creek	20° 19' 7" S	118° 35' 57" E	
East Harding River	20° 51' 27" S	117° 11' 48" E	
Eastern Creek	21° 43' 0" S	120° 33' 52" E	
Eastern Creek	25° 43' 3" S	117° 57' 6" E	
Eastward Creek	21° 6' 10" S	120° 3' 39" E	
Eda Creek	28° 28' 16" S	115° 32' 46" E	
Edeys Creek	15° 8' 24" S	125° 48' 38" E	
Edgina Creek	21° 28' 6" S	118° 33' 49" E	
Edgundy Creek	23° 21' 33" S	116° 55' 54" E	
Edkins Creek	17° 6' 36" S	125° 51' 29" E	
Edle Creek	17° 42' 4" S	127° 58' 9" E	
Edmund Claypan Creek	23° 39' 51" S	116° 15' 40" E	
Edmund River	23° 59' 7" S	116° 1' 40" E	
Edna Creek	21° 29' 22" S	119° 49' 10" E	
Edward Creek	21° 1' 56" S	116° 8' 18" E	
Eedles Gully	33° 21' 9" S	115° 40' 22" E	
Eel Creek	20° 35' 15" S	120° 14' 12" E	
Eel Creek	17° 8' 57" S	125° 41' 36" E	
Egg Creek	20° 33' 45" S	119° 58' 22" E	
Ego Creek	28° 42' 59" S	114° 41' 59" E	
Elasmias Creek	15° 1' 42" S	126° 40' 1" E	
Elder Creek	26° 20' 54" S	126° 31' 11" E	
Elgalgerra Creek	26° 56' 52" S	116° 32' 21" E	
Ellen Brook	33° 54' 34" S	114° 59' 16" E	
Ellen Brook	31° 47' 57" S	115° 58' 45" E	
Ellenbrae Creek	15° 54' 4" S	127° 12' 59" E	
Ellina Creek	21° 53' 56" S	118° 7' 26" E	
Elliot Creek	24° 4' 6" S	116° 21' 37" E	
Elliott Creek	24° 0' 1" S	116° 26' 25" E	
Ellis Brook	32° 4' 4" S	115° 59' 54" E	
Ellis Creek	33° 55' 19" S	115° 48' 29" E	
Elsie Brook	34° 51' 16" S	116° 42' 17" E	
Elsie Creek	21° 29' 43" S	120° 30' 6" E	
Elvira Gully	33° 15' 38" S	115° 46' 49" E	
Elvire River	17° 51' 2" S	128° 12' 1" E	
Elyaring Brook	31° 13' 19" S	116° 43' 17" E	
Emanuel Creek	18° 40' 21" S	125° 53' 10" E	
Emu Brook	31° 54' 50" S	116° 20' 43" E	
Emu Creek	15° 6' 9" S	128° 33' 49" E	
Emu Creek	21° 25' 7" S	119° 44' 12" E	
Emu Creek	20° 44' 22" S	120° 8' 9" E	
Emu Creek	16° 54' 1" S	128° 21' 50" E	
Emu Creek	23° 1' 53" S	115° 2' 10" E	
Enacheddong Creek	22° 6' 42" S	121° 9' 28" E	
Encampment Gully	31° 46' 9" S	116° 31' 1" E	
Eneabba Creek	29° 51' 8" S	115° 8' 48" E	
Eneminga Brook	30° 49' 4" S	115° 31' 39" E	
Ephraim Gully	34° 11' 33" S	116° 1' 15" E	
Equitus Gully	31° 44' 24" S	116° 11' 14" E	
Erallia Brook	30° 48' 58" S	116° 0' 53" E	
Eramurra Creek	20° 54' 6" S	116° 15' 16" E	
Erimia Creek	25° 23' 21" S	117° 9' 2" E	
Erindoon Creek	29° 52' 17" S	115° 9' 34" E	
Erlistoun Creek	27° 44' 55" S	121° 35' 47" E	
Erlistoun Creek East	27° 30' 30" S	121° 58' 30" E	
Ernest River	33° 11' 8" S	116° 1' 1" E	
Ernest River	15° 13' 54" S	127° 34' 20" E	
Ero Creek	26° 23' 12" S	117° 19' 53" E	
Erong Creek	25° 13' 39" S	116° 38' 35" E	
Errida Creek	25° 10' 5" S	117° 1' 0" E	
Escape Creek	16° 10' 42" S	127° 2' 53" E	
Esdaile Creek	30° 51' 33" S	120° 5' 57" E	
Esma Creek	22° 3' 50" S	120° 42' 11" E	
Ethel River	24° 8' 23" S	118° 25' 39" E	
Ettakup Gully	33° 50' 56" S	117° 34' 50" E	
Eulin Brook	33° 41' 13" S	116° 41' 39" E	
Eva Creek	18° 26' 1" S	128° 56' 32" E	
Eva Creek	17° 18' 13" S	125° 24' 29" E	
Eves Creek	28° 45' 25" S	115° 24' 56" E	
Ewlyamartup Creek	33° 41' 24" S	117° 44' 29" E	
Eyre River	34° 35' 25" S	118° 42' 41" E	

== F ==
Name	Latitude	Longitude	Remarks
Fairfield Creek	16° 42' 20" S	125° 12' 23" E	
Falls Brook	33° 2' 49" S	115° 59' 23" E	
False Cape Creek	18° 34' 10" S	121° 44' 21" E	
Fargoo Creek	16° 54' 1" S	128° 21' 50" E	
Fat Bullock Creek	16° 37' 4" S	128° 26' 13" E	
Fattie Damper Gully	34° 11' 19" S	115° 58' 21" E	
Favell Creek	16° 11' 30" S	127° 43' 32" E	
Favenc Creek	23° 47' 27" S	118° 1' 6" E	
Federal Gully	32° 51' 42" S	116° 6' 33" E	
Felix Brook	34° 57' 52" S	116° 40' 55" E	
Ferguson River	33° 21' 26" S	115° 41' 28" E	
Fern Creek	33° 53' 54" S	123° 21' 2" E	
Fern Gully	15° 31' 25" S	125° 11' 59" E	
Fields Creek	20° 42' 5" S	116° 56' 43" E	
Finches Creek	14° 49' 28" S	126° 54' 32" E	
Fine Spring Creek	16° 0' 44" S	128° 58' 18" E	
Finerty Creek	25° 16' 56" S	116° 40' 54" E	
Fingerpost Creek	20° 35' 55" S	118° 42' 27" E	
Finlay Brook	32° 30' 12" S	116° 5' 12" E	
Fire Spring Creek	16° 32' 3" S	126° 18' 23" E	
Firewood Creek	20° 1' 8" S	119° 44' 48" E	
Fish Creek	34° 40' 26" S	116° 22' 25" E	
Fish Creek	34° 53' 44" S	116° 17' 19" E	
Fish Creek	21° 8' 59" S	117° 13' 59" E	
Fish Hole Creek	16° 44' 16" S	125° 16' 57" E	
Fish River	15° 35' 53" S	124° 40' 57" E	
Fitts Creek	33° 0' 50" S	116° 55' 0" E	
Fitzgerald River	34° 5' 5" S	119° 34' 33" E	
Fitzroy River	17° 25' 39" S	123° 33' 52" E	
Flaherty Brook	33° 18' 11" S	115° 48' 59" E	
Flat Rock Gully Nature Reserve	31° 24' 52" S	116° 28' 22" E	
Flatstone Creek	18° 8' 24" S	128° 45' 48" E	
Fletcher Brook	30° 57' 46" S	116° 13' 39" E	
Fletcher Creek	21° 36' 55" S	119° 32' 35" E	
Fletcher Creek	17° 28' 12" S	128° 3' 18" E	
Fletcher River	17° 4' 42" S	124° 51' 20" E	
Fleury Creek	25° 20' 21" S	116° 39' 24" E	
Flint Gully	32° 18' 2" S	116° 39' 52" E	
Flower Creek	27° 54' 13" S	122° 17' 7" E	
Floyd Creek	18° 29' 8" S	123° 23' 6" E	
Floyds Gully	33° 51' 19" S	116° 5' 12" E	
Fly Brook	34° 27' 41" S	115° 49' 17" E	
Flying Fox Creek	16° 33' 10" S	128° 29' 40" E	
Foal Creek	17° 23' 17" S	127° 43' 23" E	
Folly River	32° 17' 34" S	115° 50' 7" E	
Fords Creek	23° 31' 16" S	117° 16' 22" E	
Fords Creek East	23° 51' 26" S	117° 19' 39" E	
Fords Creek West	23° 48' 46" S	117° 21' 14" E	
Forest Creek	14° 39' 43" S	126° 56' 54" E	
Fork Creek	23° 17' 28" S	118° 3' 34" E	
Fork Creek	15° 34' 55" S	128° 14' 49" E	
Forked Creek	26° 21' 5" S	122° 39' 21" E	
Forman Creek	18° 24' 46" S	126° 55' 43" E	
Forrest Creek	24° 46' 32" S	127° 35' 10" E	
Forrest Creek	17° 22' 50" S	128° 50' 55" E	
Forrest River	15° 18' 27" S	128° 3' 55" E	
Fort Mueller Creek	26° 11' 34" S	127° 57' 49" E	
Fortescue River	21° 0' 8" S	116° 5' 56" E	
Fortescue River Basin	22° 20' 33" S	118° 53' 0" E	
Fortescue River South	22° 2' 29" S	118° 2' 57" E	
Forth River	34° 50' 55" S	116° 26' 30" E	
Foster Brook	32° 30' 50" S	116° 2' 16" E	
Foster Creek	18° 38' 49" S	128° 27' 47" E	
Fowl Creek	20° 22' 3" S	119° 22' 32" E	
Fowler Creek	31° 50' 51" S	116° 1' 17" E	
Fox River	18° 20' 39" S	127° 59' 50" E	
Francis Brook	33° 40' 40" S	117° 22' 34" E	
Frank Hall Creek	34° 11' 23" S	116° 10' 29" E	
Frank River	17° 31' 57" S	128° 13' 20" E	
Frankland River	35° 0' 11" S	116° 46' 10" E	Falls into the Nornalup Inlet
Fraser Creek	23° 59' 0" S	116° 12' 30" E	
Fraser River	17° 21' 0" S	123° 18' 38" E	
Fraser South River	17° 25' 18" S	123° 19' 25" E	
Fred Brook	34° 15' 18" S	116° 15' 10" E	
Frederic River	33° 12' 48" S	115° 59' 27" E	
Frederick River	24° 11' 22" S	116° 36' 14" E	
Frederick Smith Creek	30° 32' 47" S	115° 10' 57" E	
Friendly Creek	21° 13' 12" S	118° 24' 6" E	
Frog Hollow Creek	17° 14' 47" S	128° 2' 50" E	

== G ==
Name	Latitude	Longitude	Remarks
Gaalgegup Creek	34° 33' 53" S	117° 57' 59" E	
Gabba Gabba Gully	27° 42' 31" S	114° 9' 55" E	
Gabbyquoiquoi Creek	31° 2' 7" S	116° 42' 26" E	
Gabidine Brook	31° 36' 36" S	116° 24' 29" E	
Gairdner River	34° 17' 9" S	119° 27' 37" E	
Gairdner River (Kimberley)	15° 41' 41" S	124° 44' 57" E	
Galloping Creek	16° 34' 12" S	128° 29' 3" E	
Galway Creek	32° 39' 29" S	116° 32' 1" E	
Gandjal Creek	15° 28' 5" S	125° 37' 38" E	
Gap Creek	18° 42' 15" S	125° 45' 42" E	
Gap Creek	15° 49' 48" S	127° 53' 47" E	
Gap Creek	18° 32' 39" S	125° 18' 40" E	
Gap Creek	22° 33' 59" S	122° 12' 12" E	
Gap Well Creek	21° 16' 59" S	117° 14' 59" E	
Garden Creek	20° 59' 27" S	119° 55' 59" E	
Garden Creek	21° 51' 30" S	119° 23' 5" E	
Garden Creek	18° 37' 43" S	127° 14' 18" E	
Garden Gully Creek	26° 32' 35" S	118° 15' 5" E	
Gardner River	34° 50' 41" S	116° 7' 17" E	
Garimbu Creek	15° 19' 49" S	125° 33' 54" E	
Gariyeli Creek	15° 30' 48" S	125° 13' 6" E	
Gascoyne River	24° 52' 9" S	113° 38' 32" E	
Gascoyne River Middle	25° 11' 54" S	119° 23' 18" E	
Gascoyne River North	25° 15' 47" S	119° 3' 4" E	
Gascoyne River South	25° 25' 40" S	119° 12' 32" E	
Gate Creek	16° 52' 14" S	128° 22' 34" E	
Gaunt Creek	27° 49' 8" S	114° 45' 36" E	
Gavin Gully	33° 32' 59" S	115° 46' 2" E	
Gavin Gully	31° 13' 28" S	116° 25' 7" E	
Geebulla Creek	29° 27' 43" S	115° 48' 30" E	
Geedapping Gully	32° 16' 14" S	116° 44' 41" E	
Geegelup Brook	33° 58' 5" S	116° 7' 45" E	
Geegully Creek	18° 5' 4" S	123° 53' 40" E	
Geeralying Brook	33° 0' 20" S	116° 59' 37" E	
Geeranoo Creek	25° 12' 31" S	115° 40' 49" E	
Genbirr Creek	25° 26' 59" S	122° 55' 34" E	
Gentle Annie Creek	18° 17' 6" S	127° 56' 0" E	
Gentle Creek	33° 53' 30" S	122° 4' 31" E	
Geode Creek	23° 17' 12" S	117° 44' 23" E	
George Brook	32° 35' 24" S	115° 52' 9" E	
George River	20° 50' 30" S	117° 27' 40" E	
George River	21° 18' 29" S	117° 21' 44" E	
Gerald Creek	21° 16' 45" S	115° 53' 44" E	
Geringee Creek	25° 12' 51" S	116° 6' 36" E	
Gervase River	33° 21' 6" S	115° 58' 54" E	
Gibb Gully	32° 21' 19" S	116° 34' 9" E	
Gibb River	15° 37' 10" S	126° 37' 53" E	
Gibb River	16° 8' 59" S	126° 24' 59" E	
Gibbs Creek	33° 4' 54" S	115° 55' 26" E	
Gibneys Gully	33° 50' 22" S	116° 1' 29" E	
Gibson Creek	15° 52' 2" S	124° 40' 17" E	
Gidgegannup Brook	31° 47' 42" S	116° 8' 58" E	
Gidgelbetarbup Creek	34° 3' 57" S	118° 5' 43" E	
Gidgia Creek	18° 23' 16" S	127° 10' 21" E	
Gidjeebadarlabup Creek	34° 3' 41" S	118° 16' 59" E	
Gifford Creek	23° 59' 34" S	116° 13' 1" E	
Gilbut Creek	16° 35' 22" S	122° 46' 29" E	
Giles Creek	25° 9' 37" S	128° 54' 1" E	
Giles Gully	34° 25' 41" S	118° 46' 13" E	
Gillam Creek	21° 0' 35" S	118° 40' 48" E	
Gin Creek	26° 56' 25" S	126° 15' 58" E	
Gingagup Brook	32° 17' 36" S	116° 0' 55" E	
Ginganup Brook	34° 26' 6" S	116° 32' 33" E	
Gingarrigan Creek	21° 7' 5" S	120° 58' 22" E	
Gingin Brook	31° 18' 8" S	115° 36' 1" E	
Gingin Brook South	31° 17' 32" S	115° 46' 54" E	
Give And Take Creek	18° 44' 34" S	125° 53' 55" E	
Glauert Creek	14° 58' 53" S	125° 56' 15" E	
Glen Avon Creek	31° 36' 18" S	116° 31' 57" E	
Glen Brook	31° 53' 0" S	116° 5' 26" E	
Glen Herring Creek	21° 15' 8" S	119° 41' 17" E	
Glen Ross Creek	24° 6' 10" S	118° 13' 25" E	
Glenarty Creek	34° 13' 6" S	115° 9' 41" E	
Glenburnie Creek	25° 24' 23" S	117° 10' 0" E	
Glenelg River	15° 49' 4" S	124° 44' 10" E	
Glengarry Creek	26° 16' 6" S	118° 55' 53" E	
Gliddon River	18° 29' 54" S	126° 38' 5" E	
Gnamma Creek	33° 39' 45" S	120° 26' 4" E	
Gnamoongie Creek	15° 3' 24" S	126° 18' 22" E	
Gnowanallup Gully	33° 44' 40" S	118° 3' 47" E	
Gnowangerup Creek	33° 57' 31" S	118° 1' 40" E	
Gnowergerup Brook	33° 54' 46" S	116° 24' 14" E	
Gnyakalup Gully	34° 4' 8" S	116° 54' 46" E	
Goanna Creek	16° 17' 10" S	126° 59' 15" E	
Goblin Brook	31° 35' 56" S	116° 38' 38" E	
Golaluarra Brook	28° 46' 36" S	114° 50' 56" E	
Gold Creek	34° 3' 19" S	115° 47' 19" E	
Gold Hole Creek	34° 5' 23" S	117° 2' 35" E	
Gold Mine Gully	32° 25' 11" S	116° 11' 32" E	
Golden Gully	29° 16' 58" S	117° 15' 51" E	
Goldfields Creek	24° 4' 6" S	119° 12' 10" E	
Goman Creek	22° 21' 0" S	119° 20' 37" E	
Goodga River	34° 57' 32" S	118° 5' 34" E	
Googhenama Creek	22° 8' 47" S	121° 20' 40" E	
Goolul Creek	15° 6' 42" S	127° 47' 7" E	
Goomaljerup Creek	32° 30' 51" S	115° 58' 27" E	
Goonanugo Creek	30° 56' 11" S	116° 2' 38" E	
Goondaring Gully	29° 10' 36" S	115° 23' 8" E	
Goongoolup Branch	32° 35' 31" S	115° 45' 45" E	
Gooralong Brook	32° 21' 42" S	116° 1' 19" E	
Goose Hill Creek	15° 34' 42" S	128° 21' 22" E	
Gorden Creek	18° 3' 1" S	127° 12' 16" E	
Gordon Creek	26° 42' 29" S	116° 52' 21" E	
Gordon River	34° 12' 32" S	116° 59' 57" E	
Gorge Creek	24° 5' 9" S	118° 3' 12" E	
Gorge Creek	26° 53' 58" S	126° 17' 58" E	
Gorge Creek	23° 15' 42" S	116° 44' 47" E	
Gorge Creek	16° 22' 55" S	126° 54' 2" E	
Gorge Creek West	24° 10' 45" S	118° 1' 49" E	
Gould Creek	25° 56' 20" S	117° 17' 21" E	
Granite Creek	28° 51' 1" S	120° 45' 46" E	
Granite Creek	16° 1' 9" S	128° 50' 26" E	
Granite Creek	21° 5' 43" S	120° 2' 27" E	
Grant Creek	15° 3' 18" S	128° 55' 27" E	
Grant Creek North	15° 5' 42" S	128° 50' 39" E	
Grant Spring Creek	21° 16' 39" S	117° 32' 22" E	
Grant Spring Creek	21° 6' 25" S	117° 26' 9" E	
Grants Creek	17° 50' 26" S	127° 57' 45" E	
Granville Creek	15° 24' 44" S	126° 28' 34" E	
Grass Valley Brook	31° 39' 36" S	116° 42' 58" E	
Grassy Brook	28° 24' 50" S	114° 50' 33" E	
Grassy Creek	27° 23' 37" S	120° 23' 13" E	
Gratton Creek	30° 56' 52" S	116° 40' 13" E	
Grave Creek	24° 29' 9" S	118° 34' 57" E	
Grave Creek	17° 0' 2" S	125° 31' 30" E	
Graves Brook	31° 51' 22" S	116° 48' 3" E	
Grays Creek	24° 49' 53" S	115° 23' 37" E	
Green Brook	29° 10' 52" S	115° 26' 31" E	
Green Gully	33° 41' 49" S	115° 22' 21" E	
Greendale Creek	31° 0' 42" S	116° 24' 14" E	
Greenough River	28° 51' 58" S	114° 38' 0" E	
Gregory Brook	33° 55' 57" S	115° 58' 38" E	
Gregory Creek	21° 57' 1" S	121° 9' 56" E	
Gregorys 30 Yard Creek	25° 11' 31" S	116° 30' 48" E	
Grevillea Creek	16° 30' 38" S	125° 19' 9" E	
Grey Mare Creek	28° 10' 42" S	121° 25' 44" E	
Grey Mare Creek	17° 22' 9" S	126° 5' 31" E	
Grey Mare Creek	16° 40' 17" S	126° 17' 58" E	
Greytail Creek	16° 51' 24" S	125° 22' 10" E	
Grimpy Creek	18° 35' 13" S	126° 55' 31" E	
Grimwood Creek	16° 3' 57" S	127° 42' 27" E	
Gringer Creek	32° 43' 15" S	116° 29' 19" E	
Grotto Creek	15° 42' 53" S	128° 16' 3" E	
Gugeri Creek	31° 56' 6" S	116° 13' 5" E	
Gull Creek	34° 1' 16" S	118° 10' 49" E	
Gulmidge Creek	31° 42' 29" S	116° 36' 48" E	
Gum Creek	20° 59' 25" S	121° 1' 29" E	
Gum Creek	26° 58' 16" S	115° 58' 58" E	
Gum Creek	28° 43' 13" S	120° 30' 24" E	
Gum Creek	24° 46' 53" S	116° 5' 19" E	
Gum Creek	15° 24' 53" S	128° 51' 43" E	
Gum Creek	22° 6' 20" S	115° 37' 12" E	
Gum Creek	16° 39' 23" S	128° 45' 17" E	
Gum Creek	24° 50' 2" S	121° 27' 42" E	
Gum Creek	26° 28' 59" S	119° 58' 53" E	
Gum Creek	28° 35' 9" S	122° 12' 29" E	
Gum Creek	23° 23' 20" S	116° 12' 6" E	
Gum Well Creek	28° 15' 52" S	122° 14' 9" E	
Gumbula Creek	15° 8' 20" S	127° 49' 56" E	
Gundarara Creek	15° 49' 47" S	125° 37' 4" E	
Gunnethurra Creek	27° 25' 11" S	117° 11' 12" E	
Gunpowder Creek	21° 30' 3" S	119° 23' 45" E	
Gunyulgup Brook	33° 41' 5" S	115° 2' 10" E	
Gurrbirri Creek	14° 37' 37" S	125° 39' 36" E	
Gururu Creek	18° 36' 37" S	121° 46' 54" E	
Gwen Creek	20° 43' 28" S	116° 55' 27" E	
Gwynne Creek	29° 28' 15" S	125° 11' 31" E	
Gynudup Brook	33° 32' 14" S	115° 32' 48" E	

== H ==
Name	Latitude	Longitude	Remarks
Hackett Creek	28° 9' 44" S	115° 34' 14" E	
Hackett Gully	31° 58' 31" S	116° 5' 3" E	
Hacks Creek	28° 7' 12" S	119° 19' 26" E	
Haddleton Gully	33° 39' 59" S	116° 34' 42" E	
Hagen Creek	28° 33' 28" S	122° 37' 6" E	
Hair Creek	15° 17' 42" S	126° 9' 41" E	
Halls Creek (Western Australian watercourse)	18° 15' 17" S	127° 47' 54" E	
Hamersley River	33° 56' 53" S	119° 55' 12" E	
Hamilton River	33° 19' 40" S	116° 2' 44" E	
Hamlet Creek	23° 16' 41" S	115° 21' 24" E	
Hancock Brook	31° 57' 20" S	116° 18' 47" E	
Hangman Creek	18° 40' 15" S	127° 10' 21" E	
Hanlon Creek	31° 37' 46" S	117° 34' 31" E	
Hann River	17° 26' 14" S	126° 17' 52" E	
Hann River North	16° 18' 6" S	126° 12' 38" E	
Hanns Boab Creek	16° 58' 43" S	125° 32' 59" E	
Hanson Brook	33° 17' 2" S	116° 9' 20" E	
Hardens Rockhole Creek	16° 48' 54" S	128° 13' 1" E	
Hardey River	22° 43' 59" S	116° 7' 7" E	
Harding River	20° 41' 27" S	117° 10' 55" E	
Harding River East	21° 4' 46" S	117° 8' 4" E	
Harms Creek	18° 24' 55" S	126° 47' 51" E	
Harper Brook	31° 34' 4" S	116° 29' 0" E	
Harrington Brook	33° 48' 59" S	115° 43' 5" E	
Harris Creek	16° 51' 52" S	126° 3' 27" E	
Harris River	33° 17' 49" S	116° 8' 56" E	
Hartigan Creek	21° 30' 11" S	119° 33' 11" E	
Harvey River	32° 46' 25" S	115° 42' 39" E	
Haunted Hole Creek	21° 56' 35" S	119° 22' 49" E	
Hawkhurst Creek	31° 49' 40" S	116° 48' 25" E	
Hawkstone Creek	17° 19' 30" S	124° 15' 28" E	
Hawthornden Brook	31° 31' 10" S	116° 27' 9" E	
Hay Creek	31° 58' 17" S	116° 10' 4" E	
Hay River	34° 58' 19" S	117° 27' 39" E	
Hayes Gully	33° 7' 12" S	117° 34' 54" E	
Hays Creek	21° 52' 33" S	120° 46' 18" E	
Heal Brook	31° 46' 6" S	116° 42' 12" E	
Hedley Spring Creek	16° 55' 16" S	128° 41' 47" E	
Hegarty Creek	34° 5' 58" S	118° 51' 12" E	
Helby River	14° 44' 51" S	128° 10' 45" E	
Helena Brook	31° 57' 29" S	116° 17' 45" E	
Helena River	31° 54' 19" S	115° 57' 42" E	
Hell Creek	33° 59' 43" S	116° 11' 15" E	
Henley Brook	31° 48' 1" S	115° 59' 56" E	
Henry River East	23° 27' 19" S	115° 47' 47" E	
Henry River	22° 40' 16" S	115° 40' 17" E	
Henty Brook	33° 18' 16" S	115° 47' 13" E	
Hester Brook	33° 55' 38" S	116° 3' 36" E	
Hicks Creek	33° 36' 53" S	119° 47' 28" E	
Hilfordy Creek	18° 17' 11" S	126° 25' 50" E	
Hill River	30° 23' 26" S	115° 2' 57" E	
Hillman Brook	31° 39' 43" S	116° 39' 21" E	
Hillman River	33° 25' 53" S	116° 48' 50" E	
Hillman River South	33° 15' 29" S	116° 43' 2" E	
Holyoake Brook	32° 44' 10" S	116° 6' 50" E	
Home Creek	20° 59' 46" S	120° 3' 23" E	
Homestead Creek	15° 36' 39" S	128° 31' 16" E	
Homestead Creek	17° 31' 58" S	125° 48' 43" E	
Homestead Creek	23° 17' 59" S	119° 44' 14" E	
Homestead Creek South	23° 17' 53" S	119° 40' 6" E	
Homestead South Creek	23° 18' 21" S	119° 32' 31" E	
Hommajelly Gully	31° 55' 43" S	117° 29' 48" E	
Honeyeater Creek	21° 14' 16" S	119° 16' 51" E	
Honeysuckle Creek	17° 14' 13" S	125° 27' 35" E	
Honor Brook	32° 21' 32" S	116° 7' 23" E	
Hooley Creek	21° 41' 28" S	115° 1' 23" E	
Hooley Creek	21° 51' 59" S	117° 55' 59" E	
Hoon Creek	17° 7' 5" S	123° 17' 14" E	
Hooper Creek	17° 58' 8" S	125° 47' 5" E	
Hope Creek	21° 42' 15" S	118° 37' 51" E	
Hope Creek	23° 1' 57" S	117° 20' 56" E	
Hope Creek	22° 58' 9" S	117° 18' 18" E	
Hope Creek	16° 29' 55" S	124° 28' 1" E	
Hope River	26° 5' 57" S	117° 55' 36" E	
Horkinup Creek	34° 41' 49" S	117° 14' 18" E	
Hornsby Creek	30° 54' 51" S	116° 43' 33" E	
Horrigan Creek	23° 34' 40" S	118° 15' 32" E	
Horse Creek	18° 5' 17" S	128° 47' 6" E	
Horse Creek	16° 13' 10" S	127° 42' 20" E	
Horse Creek	16° 12' 25" S	127° 13' 3" E	
Horse Creek	17° 39' 30" S	126° 48' 18" E	
Horse Creek	16° 58' 8" S	128° 42' 17" E	
Horse Creek	18° 29' 25" S	128° 42' 35" E	
Horse Creek	18° 18' 5" S	125° 53' 28" E	
Horse Gully	33° 50' 35" S	116° 35' 32" E	
Horse Gully	34° 24' 51" S	116° 14' 16" E	
Horse Paddock Creek	21° 0' 24" S	117° 26' 6" E	
Horse Rock Gully	31° 32' 29" S	116° 38' 20" E	
Horse Rockhole Creek	17° 11' 16" S	127° 29' 22" E	
Hosking Brook	31° 56' 10" S	116° 3' 58" E	
Hotham River	32° 58' 32" S	116° 23' 46" E	
Hotham River North	32° 36' 40" S	117° 6' 22" E	
Hotham River South	32° 43' 31" S	117° 9' 58" E	
Hough Brook	33° 25' 1" S	115° 49' 32" E	
House Creek	24° 22' 59" S	116° 18' 59" E	
House Creek	18° 3' 2" S	128° 0' 37" E	
House Creek	21° 18' 18" S	120° 4' 7" E	
Houston Creek	21° 2' 43" S	118° 47' 16" E	
Howlett Creek	21° 38' 26" S	117° 9' 38" E	
Howse Brook	32° 56' 39" S	116° 11' 2" E	
Hughes Creek	26° 8' 51" S	126° 32' 42" E	
Hughs Dale	10° 28' 33" S	105° 33' 26" E	
Hull Brook	32° 49' 35" S	115° 54' 28" E	
Humbert Creek	16° 30' 5" S	124° 27' 40" E	
Hunt Gully	29° 3' 21" S	115° 1' 30" E	
Hunter Creek	16° 23' 33" S	122° 59' 11" E	
Hunter River	15° 2' 34" S	125° 22' 50" E	
Hunter River	34° 21' 9" S	119° 25' 15" E	
Huntsman Creek	21° 7' 59" S	119° 51' 50" E	
Hurdle Creek	33° 4' 53" S	117° 46' 35" E	
Hursts Brook	34° 11' 59" S	115° 45' 59" E	
Hutt River	28° 18' 42" S	114° 18' 1" E	
Hutton Creek	24° 7' 12" S	114° 24' 8" E	

== See also ==
- Geography of Western Australia
