= List of watercourses in Western Australia, C =

Western Australia has many watercourses with gazetted names, including rivers, streams, brooks, creeks, gullies, anabranches and backwaters.

This list is complete with respect to the 1996 Gazetteer of Australia. Dubious names have been checked against the online 2004 data, and in all cases confirmed correct. However, if any watercourses have been gazetted or deleted since 1996, this list does not reflect these changes. Strictly speaking, Australian place names are gazetted in capital letters only; the names in this list have been converted to mixed case in accordance with normal capitalisation conventions. Locations are as gazetted; some watercourses may extend over long distances.

Name	Latitude	Longitude	Remarks
C-Y Creek	22° 51' 18" S	114° 6' 20" E	
C. Everett Creek	28° 20' 40" S	119° 37' 6" E	
Cabbage Tree Creek	16° 21' 46" S	128° 4' 21" E	
Cabbykail Creek	33° 50' 59" S	122° 40' 14" E	
Cadalelup Creek	33° 55' 56" S	118° 0' 44" E	
Cadjoue Creek	25° 45' 21" S	116° 30' 57" E	
Cajuput Creek	21° 53' 12" S	120° 7' 56" E	
Cajuput Creek	17° 45' 24" S	125° 26' 32" E	
Cajuput Creek	16° 49' 50" S	125° 37' 12" E	
Calanchini Creek	26° 43' 54" S	123° 46' 48" E	
Calbrajacka Creek	24° 22' 53" S	115° 31' 17" E	
Calcalong Creek	26° 23' 39" S	120° 24' 9" E	
Calcoran Brook	32° 37' 19" S	117° 7' 35" E	
Calder River	16° 22' 18" S	124° 57' 3" E	
Calgardup Brook	34° 2' 29" S	115° 1' 37" E	
Calico Creek	18° 8' 9" S	128° 42' 41" E	
Caliwinga Creek	21° 46' 48" S	117° 28' 11" E	
Callawa Creek	20° 33' 28" S	120° 39' 47" E	
Callina Creek	21° 18' 45" S	119° 19' 31" E	
Calyerup Creek	33° 57' 57" S	119° 2' 47" E	
Camarotoechia Creek	17° 56' 44" S	125° 8' 4" E	
Camel Creek	26° 50' 47" S	120° 21' 47" E	
Camel Creek	16° 38' 58" S	128° 10' 35" E	
Camel Creek	16° 48' 30" S	128° 22' 42" E	
Camel Creek	21° 50' 55" S	120° 20' 48" E	
Camel Creek	21° 17' 49" S	119° 42' 53" E	
Cameron Creek	33° 45' 5" S	119° 10' 29" E	
Camiara Creek	17° 21' 38" S	124° 20' 3" E	
Camp Brook	33° 54' 42" S	115° 57' 44" E	
Camp Creek	14° 52' 32" S	125° 42' 44" E	
Camp Gully	33° 37' 17" S	115° 39' 15" E	
Campbell Creek	16° 1' 48" S	126° 55' 56" E	
Campbell Creek	15° 53' 43" S	127° 8' 17" E	
Canal Creek	15° 19' 17" S	128° 3' 48" E	
Candy Creek	18° 6' 51" S	128° 39' 10" E	
Cane Brake Creek	33° 49' 51" S	115° 19' 55" E	
Cane River	21° 32' 54" S	115° 22' 45" E	
Canning Creek	21° 38' 8" S	119° 19' 10" E	
Canning River	32° 0' 7" S	115° 50' 54" E	
Canning River East	32° 10' 17" S	116° 9' 11" E	
Canterbury River	34° 43' 36" S	116° 11' 11" E	
Capapora Brook	30° 53' 33" S	116° 14' 16" E	
Cape Arid Creek	33° 58' 13" S	123° 9' 35" E	
Cape Bossut Creek	18° 42' 57" S	121° 37' 45" E	
Capel River	33° 30' 48" S	115° 31' 1" E	
Capel River North	33° 39' 9" S	115° 44' 59" E	
Capel River South	33° 39' 9" S	115° 44' 59" E	
Caporn Creek	20° 54' 37" S	117° 51' 3" E	
Capsize Gully	33° 44' 35" S	115° 50' 16" E	
Caraline Creek	23° 21' 12" S	115° 23' 11" E	
Caramulla Creek	23° 8' 4" S	120° 18' 51" E	
Carawine Creek	21° 29' 13" S	121° 1' 29" E	
Carbakine Creek	33° 18' 37" S	117° 23' 40" E	
Carbar Creek	26° 36' 6" S	117° 57' 53" E	
Carbunup Brook	34° 0' 15" S	116° 14' 37" E	
Carbunup Brook	33° 59' 40" S	116° 14' 26" E	
Carbunup Brook	33° 51' 16" S	115° 9' 43" E	
Carbunup River	33° 43' 56" S	115° 11' 37" E	
Card Creek	15° 58' 41" S	128° 30' 32" E	
Cardabia Creek	23° 33' 8" S	114° 3' 11" E	
Cardabia Creek	24° 27' 30" S	113° 38' 40" E	
Cardilya Creek	25° 37' 52" S	115° 17' 47" E	
Cardinia Creek	28° 57' 44" S	121° 34' 12" E	
Cardup Brook	32° 14' 15" S	115° 58' 11" E	
Caren Caren Brook	30° 53' 55" S	115° 34' 24" E	
Carey Brook	34° 24' 58" S	115° 48' 38" E	
Carey Creek	16° 30' 31" S	126° 29' 37" E	
Carlecatup Creek	33° 39' 17" S	117° 14' 22" E	
Carlia Creek	14° 59' 42" S	126° 48' 38" E	
Carlingup Creek	33° 32' 4" S	120° 11' 11" E	
Carlo Creek	25° 10' 37" S	116° 4' 40" E	
Carlotta Brook	34° 0' 2" S	115° 45' 10" E	
Caro Brook	30° 46' 6" S	115° 29' 12" E	
Carolina Creek	21° 12' 41" S	117° 13' 51" E	
Caroline Creek	17° 0' 2" S	125° 59' 43" E	
Caroline Creek	16° 58' 27" S	125° 56' 53" E	
Carolyn Creek	18° 41' 21" S	124° 45' 41" E	
Carraba Creek	20° 52' 59" S	118° 48' 11" E	
Carracarrup Creek	33° 45' 45" S	119° 57' 11" E	
Carracootharra Creek	27° 41' 59" S	119° 28' 37" E	
Carralapindarranuna Creek	20° 55' 15" S	120° 11' 8" E	
Carralong Brook	32° 21' 48" S	116° 1' 18" E	
Carrington Creek	17° 54' 28" S	127° 40' 6" E	
Carrolup River	33° 38' 52" S	117° 17' 27" E	
Carrowina Creek	22° 27' 13" S	121° 11' 49" E	
Carruthers Creek	26° 18' 33" S	128° 52' 13" E	
Carson River	14° 25' 59" S	126° 38' 4" E	
Carters Brook	34° 26' 25" S	116° 14' 15" E	
Carynginia Gully	28° 55' 12" S	115° 33' 22" E	
Cascade Creek	15° 37' 29" S	125° 18' 12" E	
Cascade Creek	33° 31' 55" S	120° 59' 9" E	
Cascades Brook	33° 53' 31" S	116° 6' 48" E	
Castle Creek	18° 11' 37" S	128° 6' 42" E	
Castle Creek	21° 55' 9" S	120° 11' 29" E	
Castlereagh Creek	16° 48' 12" S	127° 52' 8" E	
Casuarina Creek	27° 32' 24" S	117° 31' 13" E	
Casuarina Creek	14° 23' 15" S	127° 43' 44" E	
Casuarina Gully	31° 41' 46" S	116° 5' 58" E	
Cat Creek	28° 59' 9" S	115° 28' 48" E	
Cat Gully	31° 53' 17" S	117° 11' 46" E	
Cataby Brook	30° 47' 56" S	115° 30' 55" E	
Cattle Creek	16° 50' 15" S	128° 30' 58" E	
Cattle Creek	22° 3' 1" S	120° 42' 55" E	
Cattle Creek	17° 28' 30" S	128° 4' 51" E	
Cattle Creek	17° 23' 53" S	127° 26' 57" E	
Cattle Creek	21° 16' 15" S	120° 4' 12" E	
Cattle Creek	18° 26' 52" S	128° 28' 23" E	
Cattle Creek	20° 27' 22" S	119° 39' 17" E	
Cattlin Creek	33° 34' 9" S	120° 2' 52" E	
Caves Creek	22° 17' 50" S	117° 19' 55" E	
Cedar Creek	22° 5' 7" S	120° 23' 58" E	
Cement Creek	28° 47' 32" S	121° 56' 10" E	
The Central Gully	31° 14' 4" S	119° 19' 50" E	
Chaff Creek	21° 29' 13" S	120° 5' 34" E	
Chalba Creek	24° 52' 13" S	115° 53' 49" E	
Chalk Brook	33° 0' 36" S	116° 15' 8" E	
Chalmer Creek	16° 54' 47" S	124° 52' 28" E	
Chalrine Brook	31° 11' 44" S	116° 35' 44" E	
Chamberlain River	15° 58' 13" S	127° 55' 31" E	
Chandala Brook	31° 33' 34" S	115° 58' 23" E	
Change Creek	31° 1' 0" S	121° 18' 58" E	
Changoola Creek	15° 2' 53" S	126° 18' 2" E	
Channybearup Brook	34° 19' 38" S	115° 57' 33" E	
Chapman Brook	34° 5' 43" S	115° 12' 20" E	
Chapman River	28° 43' 46" S	114° 37' 5" E	
Chapman River	16° 2' 45" S	127° 11' 59" E	
Chapman River East	28° 32' 59" S	114° 52' 58" E	
Charles Wells Creek	26° 4' 25" S	122° 6' 49" E	
Charley Brook	34° 28' 11" S	115° 46' 13" E	
Charley Creek	33° 33' 31" S	115° 53' 26" E	
Charlie Creek	16° 11' 23" S	127° 0' 28" E	
Charlotte Creek	31° 52' 47" S	116° 12' 29" E	
Charnley River	16° 22' 28" S	124° 57' 10" E	
Charteris Creek	21° 27' 7" S	120° 9' 40" E	
Chauncy Gully	31° 54' 36" S	116° 16' 6" E	
Chearie Creek	23° 15' 7" S	115° 11' 51" E	
Cheeraworadoone Creek	21° 28' 59" S	116° 39' 32" E	
Cheetanning Gully	32° 44' 1" S	116° 41' 18" E	
Chelgiup Creek	34° 53' 45" S	117° 59' 58" E	
Chelupunderup Brook	34° 17' 25" S	116° 28' 14" E	
Chereninup Creek	34° 9' 52" S	118° 44' 0" E	
Chergugup Creek	34° 34' 13" S	117° 56' 47" E	
Cherrabun Creek	18° 36' 15" S	125° 24' 45" E	
Cherrybooka Creek	23° 41' 44" S	117° 47' 46" E	
Chesapeake Brook	34° 49' 1" S	116° 19' 43" E	
Chester Brook	31° 53' 53" S	116° 59' 41" E	
Chestnut Creek	17° 9' 9" S	125° 43' 35" E	
Chestnut Creek	17° 41' 15" S	125° 10' 39" E	
Chestnut Creek	16° 34' 56" S	125° 27' 45" E	
Chestnut Creek	17° 35' 25" S	124° 58' 46" E	
Chiefs Creek	22° 37' 14" S	119° 57' 32" E	
Chile Creek	16° 31' 15" S	122° 51' 12" E	
Chimney Creek	34° 5' 19" S	118° 44' 41" E	
Chimney Hut Gully	31° 42' 17" S	116° 34' 15" E	
Chinaman Creek	21° 17' 39" S	119° 54' 47" E	
Chinaman Gully	31° 59' 11" S	116° 15' 44" E	
Chinganning Gully	31° 48' 39" S	116° 20' 53" E	
Chinganning Gully South	31° 49' 58" S	116° 22' 40" E	
Chingarrup Brook	34° 19' 19" S	118° 41' 15" E	
Chinkia Creek	23° 27' 29" S	114° 6' 40" E	
Chinnamon Creek	21° 0' 3" S	118° 40' 38" E	
Chinty Creek	21° 53' 21" S	114° 51' 7" E	
Chirelillup Creek	33° 56' 45" S	118° 8' 9" E	
Chitibin Brook	31° 31' 37" S	116° 41' 2" E	
Chittawarra Brook	31° 56' 13" S	116° 6' 58" E	
Chittowurup Creek	34° 1' 16" S	118° 54' 9" E	
Choallie Creek	27° 24' 52" S	117° 7' 30" E	
Chowerup Creek	34° 8' 28" S	116° 45' 26" E	
Christmas Creek	18° 29' 11" S	125° 22' 39" E	
Christmas Creek	22° 32' 18" S	119° 47' 33" E	
Christmas Creek	33° 56' 57" S	115° 47' 3" E	
Christmas Creek	22° 29' 36" S	121° 11' 29" E	
Christmas Creek	32° 50' 13" S	116° 7' 40" E	
Christmas Tree Creek	31° 52' 28" S	116° 3' 39" E	
Christopher Brook	32° 9' 58" S	116° 47' 40" E	
Chuckem Gully	33° 10' 2" S	117° 11' 48" E	
Chunelarr Creek	16° 31' 28" S	122° 57' 44" E	
Church Gully Brook	31° 27' 35" S	116° 25' 54" E	
Churchman Brook	32° 8' 8" S	116° 3' 52" E	
Clackline Brook	31° 43' 47" S	116° 32' 1" E	
Claise Brook	31° 57' 11" S	115° 52' 32" E	
Clarke Brook	32° 59' 43" S	115° 54' 49" E	
Clarke Gully	34° 21' 16" S	116° 17' 34" E	
Clarkes Creek	16° 53' 36" S	128° 10' 27" E	
Claudius Creek	28° 14' 0" S	120° 22' 50" E	
Clayhole Creek	33° 40' 17" S	120° 52' 52" E	
Claypan Creek	29° 53' 17" S	122° 39' 2" E	
Clayton Gully	22° 29' 16" S	122° 1' 39" E	
Clean Skin Creek	18° 2' 12" S	128° 53' 34" E	
Clean Skin Pocket Creek	17° 9' 14" S	126° 27' 1" E	
Cleanskin Creek	17° 40' 54" S	125° 47' 10" E	
Cleanskin Creek	15° 4' 57" S	128° 53' 33" E	
Cleanskin Creek	18° 3' 53" S	127° 48' 8" E	
Cleave Creek	16° 27' 36" S	123° 42' 55" E	
Cleaverville Creek	20° 40' 18" S	116° 58' 25" E	
Cleerillup Creek	34° 41' 52" S	117° 13' 42" E	
Cliff Gully	34° 12' 0" S	117° 59' 26" E	
Clifford Creek	28° 28' 41" S	120° 58' 4" E	
Clifton Creek	17° 16' 14" S	125° 51' 57" E	
Clutterbuck Creek	31° 52' 32" S	116° 6' 38" E	
Coalling Brook	33° 1' 39" S	116° 52' 20" E	
Coates Gully	31° 48' 17" S	116° 22' 6" E	
Cobham Brook	31° 47' 33" S	116° 41' 28" E	
Coblinine River	33° 21' 14" S	117° 21' 35" E	
Cobomup Creek	33° 50' 4" S	118° 50' 59" E	
Cocanarup Creek	33° 38' 24" S	119° 53' 41" E	
Cockarrow Creek	26° 42' 24" S	120° 13' 32" E	
Cockatoo Creek	15° 55' 34" S	129° 0' 0" E	
Cockatoo Creek	17° 42' 38" S	123° 34' 33" E	
Cockatoo Creek	33° 58' 29" S	116° 55' 15" E	
Cockatoo Creek	20° 51' 44" S	116° 37' 39" E	
Cockatoo Creek	15° 23' 49" S	128° 49' 19" E	
Cockatoo Creek	16° 9' 34" S	127° 12' 7" E	
Cockatoo Creek	34° 43' 25" S	117° 55' 14" E	
Cockatoo Gully	33° 26' 4" S	116° 43' 35" E	
Cockburn Creek	15° 41' 23" S	128° 5' 23" E	
Cockeraga River	21° 32' 11" S	118° 34' 42" E	
Cockerding Brook	31° 24' 35" S	116° 44' 12" E	
Cockinalup Brook	33° 58' 31" S	116° 20' 33" E	
Cockleshell Gully	30° 9' 23" S	115° 2' 17" E	
Cockney Bill Creek	27° 18' 21" S	116° 12' 41" E	
Codgenollaking Brook	32° 46' 56" S	117° 20' 42" E	
Codra Creek	24° 45' 35" S	116° 15' 46" E	
Cody Creek	28° 25' 27" S	120° 52' 12" E	
Cohn Creek	31° 31' 23" S	118° 9' 18" E	
Colalya Creek	26° 9' 27" S	119° 34' 57" E	
Cole Creek	16° 57' 9" S	125° 27' 52" E	
Cole Creek	14° 36' 6" S	126° 20' 52" E	
Cole Creek	17° 0' 15" S	125° 27' 31" E	
Cole Creek	26° 15' 22" S	121° 59' 18" E	
Coles Creek	16° 28' 32" S	127° 8' 8" E	
Collanilling Gully	33° 17' 24" S	117° 29' 45" E	
Colliburgna Creek	23° 37' 34" S	115° 41' 17" E	
Collie River	33° 18' 14" S	115° 41' 25" E	
Collie River East	33° 26' 5" S	116° 23' 40" E	
Collie River South	33° 22' 54" S	116° 8' 43" E	
Collier Creek	34° 59' 13" S	116° 44' 32" E	
Collins Creek	17° 50' 32" S	122° 42' 12" E	
Collis Creek	17° 28' 41" S	126° 31' 9" E	
Collu Collup Creek	33° 50' 53" S	120° 35' 2" E	
Colochasia Creek	15° 0' 32" S	126° 39' 55" E	
Combimup Creek	34° 6' 41" S	118° 44' 41" E	
Commitine Brook	32° 46' 34" S	117° 15' 44" E	
Company Creek	17° 26' 47" S	128° 52' 9" E	
Company Creek (South)	17° 30' 22" S	128° 58' 57" E	
Conallan Creek	31° 56' 29" S	117° 21' 37" E	
Condon Creek	20° 1' 12" S	119° 20' 35" E	
Congelin Gully	32° 50' 43" S	116° 53' 26" E	
Conglomerate Creek	21° 52' 29" S	120° 5' 29" E	
Congo Creek	25° 14' 16" S	115° 39' 15" E	
Conjurunup Creek	32° 36' 58" S	115° 56' 44" E	
Connelly Creek	32° 20' 3" S	116° 36' 4" E	
Connelly Gully	32° 26' 31" S	116° 36' 50" E	
Connor Brook	31° 20' 18" S	116° 30' 52" E	
Considerable Creek	23° 5' 30" S	117° 52' 28" E	
Convict Creek	31° 55' 17" S	116° 2' 50" E	
Cooba Cooba Creek	25° 58' 53" S	122° 26' 32" E	
Coobarra Creek	24° 29' 9" S	118° 35' 4" E	
Coobidge Creek	33° 45' 32" S	121° 29' 1" E	
Coobina Creek	23° 29' 50" S	120° 18' 28" E	
Coodahjiddah Creek	25° 29' 46" S	122° 35' 30" E	
Coodewa Creek	25° 14' 24" S	118° 44' 6" E	
Cooee Creek	16° 30' 39" S	128° 44' 27" E	
Cooglegong Creek	21° 24' 31" S	119° 22' 21" E	
Cookes Brook	31° 45' 49" S	116° 13' 33" E	
Cookes Creek	21° 37' 5" S	120° 26' 2" E	
Coolajacka Creek	21° 1' 0" S	117° 10' 59" E	
Coolakin Gully	33° 2' 44" S	116° 30' 53" E	
Coolalinga Brook	31° 55' 56" S	116° 56' 1" E	
Coolargarrack Creek	21° 49' 21" S	119° 25' 15" E	
Coolbro Creek	22° 10' 1" S	122° 23' 26" E	
Cooleenup Branch	32° 34' 43" S	115° 45' 36" E	
Cooleeup Creek	32° 31' 34" S	116° 0' 13" E	
Coolerin Creek	21° 5' 37" S	117° 37' 56" E	
Coolibah Creek	18° 20' 10" S	128° 29' 3" E	
Coolingutup Brook	33° 33' 35" S	115° 47' 45" E	
Coollarburloo Brook	27° 31' 0" S	115° 47' 23" E	
Coolyia Creek	21° 20' 56" S	119° 21' 9" E	
Coomalbidgup Creek	33° 40' 48" S	121° 23' 36" E	
Coomallo Creek	30° 16' 40" S	115° 19' 38" E	
Coomba Creek	21° 36' 40" S	119° 33' 8" E	
Coomberoo Creek	24° 42' 46" S	115° 56' 48" E	
Coomborn Creek	25° 31' 45" S	122° 59' 23" E	
Coombrico Creek	24° 13' 40" S	117° 3' 14" E	
Coonaljarrie Creek	23° 6' 43" S	115° 10' 49" E	
Coonanbunna Creek	21° 1' 17" S	120° 37' 47" E	
Coonanining Brook	31° 48' 33" S	117° 1' 56" E	
Coonarrie Creek	21° 32' 59" S	118° 35' 42" E	
Coondamar Creek	22° 1' 48" S	120° 41' 8" E	
Coonderoo River	30° 29' 38" S	116° 0' 24" E	
Coondillah Creek	14° 32' 26" S	126° 32' 26" E	
Coondina Creek	21° 50' 59" S	119° 24' 20" E	
Coondiner Creek	22° 50' 32" S	119° 40' 35" E	
Coondinnar Creek	21° 27' 44" S	116° 57' 33" E	
Coondle Brook	31° 30' 9" S	116° 26' 25" E	
Coondle Creek	25° 41' 56" S	116° 49' 56" E	
Coondoo Creek	24° 50' 16" S	115° 34' 14" E	
Coondoon Creek	22° 7' 44" S	120° 45' 13" E	
Coondoondoo Creek	24° 39' 5" S	116° 28' 5" E	
Coondra Coondra Creek	23° 3' 33" S	121° 0' 34" E	
Coonga Creek	21° 1' 7" S	116° 3' 30" E	
Coongan River	20° 34' 52" S	119° 35' 30" E	
Coonieena Creek	20° 33' 46" S	120° 6' 11" E	
Coonoocoo Wash	24° 12' 57" S	115° 34' 32" E	
Cooper Creek	27° 18' 57" S	126° 17' 0" E	
Coorbeelie River	21° 5' 30" S	117° 42' 43" E	
Cooringanarranda Brook	25° 42' 42" S	122° 59' 51" E	
Coorong Creek	21° 37' 54" S	118° 53' 1" E	
Coorroolthoo Creek	24° 15' 28" S	115° 32' 5" E	
Cootenbrand Creek	19° 58' 15" S	119° 47' 25" E	
Copper Gorge Creek	21° 38' 57" S	120° 20' 26" E	
Copper Mine Creek	34° 4' 13" S	119° 37' 23" E	
Coppershaft Creek	24° 17' 35" S	115° 32' 53" E	
Coppin Gully	21° 32' 36" S	119° 32' 58" E	
Corackerup Creek	34° 9' 47" S	118° 44' 0" E	
Coramup Creek	33° 46' 49" S	121° 54' 12" E	
Cordering Creek	33° 34' 35" S	116° 41' 41" E	
Cordingup Creek	33° 35' 8" S	120° 6' 31" E	
Cordinup River	34° 40' 32" S	118° 31' 40" E	
Cordoo Gully	30° 32' 22" S	116° 21' 30" E	
Cork Creek	27° 26' 49" S	119° 33' 41" E	
Cork Tree Creek	28° 18' 50" S	119° 25' 0" E	
Corner Brook	32° 8' 19" S	116° 7' 6" E	
Cornish Gully	32° 35' 32" S	115° 52' 1" E	
Corolin Brook	31° 44' 15" S	116° 34' 44" E	
Coromup Creek	34° 3' 45" S	118° 12' 59" E	
Corral Creek	29° 13' 12" S	115° 35' 35" E	
Corralling Brook	33° 6' 20" S	116° 49' 5" E	
Corrara Creek	18° 3' 38" S	127° 45' 44" E	
Corraring Brook	32° 41' 14" S	116° 47' 33" E	
Correring Brook	32° 0' 29" S	117° 0' 27" E	
Corringer Creek	20° 51' 42" S	116° 36' 47" E	
Corung Creek	21° 24' 31" S	118° 25' 39" E	
Cotton Creek	22° 29' 57" S	122° 35' 21" E	
Coujinup Creek	33° 25' 11" S	120° 21' 18" E	
Cow Brook	34° 11' 28" S	115° 55' 31" E	
Cow Creek	16° 17' 0" S	128° 10' 30" E	
Cow Creek	16° 44' 29" S	128° 45' 44" E	
Cow Creek	18° 46' 10" S	128° 20' 21" E	
Cowan Brook	33° 52' 3" S	116° 1' 43" E	
Cowan Creek	18° 42' 18" S	121° 44' 28" E	
Cowaramup Brook	33° 51' 53" S	114° 59' 20" E	
Cowcumba Creek	21° 46' 35" S	117° 24' 45" E	
Cowendyne Creek	17° 39' 16" S	126° 5' 21" E	
Cowenup Brook	34° 12' 41" S	117° 7' 44" E	
Cowerup Creek	34° 3' 39" S	118° 47' 15" E	
Cowrie Creek	20° 23' 48" S	118° 5' 51" E	
Crab Creek	17° 59' 32" S	122° 23' 15" E	
Cream Creek	25° 3' 6" S	115° 22' 19" E	
Criddle Creek	29° 9' 50" S	115° 27' 44" E	
Crocodile Creek	16° 42' 31" S	126° 15' 28" E	
Croea Brook	34° 51' 3" S	116° 35' 41" E	
Cronin Brook	32° 30' 55" S	116° 1' 18" E	
Crooked Brook	34° 18' 27" S	115° 46' 46" E	
Crooked Brook	33° 26' 21" S	115° 43' 16" E	
Crooked Creek	16° 51' 7" S	128° 11' 32" E	
Crooked Creek	16° 31' 25" S	126° 28' 15" E	
Crossland Creek	15° 25' 28" S	126° 41' 6" E	
Crossland Creek	29° 18' 13" S	121° 47' 34" E	
Crossland Creek	16° 9' 2" S	127° 7' 50" E	
Crossman River	32° 52' 43" S	116° 32' 26" E	
Croton Creek	27° 52' 43" S	114° 34' 56" E	
Crow Creek	34° 58' 52" S	116° 56' 16" E	
Crystal Brook	35° 1' 2" S	116° 38' 5" E	
Crystal Creek	14° 28' 48" S	125° 48' 0" E	
Cullimbin Brook	30° 54' 6" S	117° 16' 45" E	
Culyerbullup Creek	34° 2' 11" S	118° 47' 13" E	
Cumbowalco Creek	26° 4' 26" S	126° 40' 28" E	
Cumbranumbra Gully	28° 32' 33" S	116° 40' 17" E	
Cundarra Creek	23° 24' 57" S	115° 33' 13" E	
Cuneenying Brook	32° 38' 52" S	117° 33' 39" E	
Cunjardine River	31° 28' 48" S	116° 44' 0" E	
Cunninghame River	18° 30' 40" S	125° 7' 17" E	
Cuppup Creek	35° 1' 29" S	117° 33' 31" E	
Curlew Creek	33° 44' 26" S	117° 28' 56" E	
Curlew Creek	15° 47' 4" S	126° 17' 54" E	
Currogin Gully	32° 40' 13" S	116° 31' 30" E	
Cutinduna Creek	22° 3' 22" S	119° 32' 39" E	
Cypress Brook	32° 46' 50" S	116° 0' 1" E	
