= List of watercourses in Western Australia, D =

Western Australia has many watercourses with gazetted names, including rivers, streams, brooks, creeks, gullies, anabranches and backwaters.

This list is complete with respect to the 1998 Gazetteer of Australia. Dubious names have been checked against the online 2004 data, and in all cases confirmed correct. However, if any watercourses have been gazetted or deleted since 1996, this list does not reflect these changes. Strictly speaking, Australian place names are gazetted in capital letters only; the names in this list have been converted to mixed case in accordance with normal capitalisation conventions. Locations are as gazetted; some watercourses may extend over long distances.

Name	Latitude	Longitude	Remarks
Dadenning Creek	31° 48' 43" S	117° 44' 15" E	
Daderdine Creek	33° 18' 19" S	116° 48' 15" E	
Dailey River	33° 54' 39" S	122° 35' 34" E	
Dake Creek	23° 51' 56" S	115° 25' 10" E	
Dale River	32° 4' 18" S	116° 49' 54" E	
Dale River South	32° 15' 59" S	116° 47' 12" E	
Dales Creek	17° 5' 57" S	125° 42' 45" E	
Dalgety Brook	25° 5' 56" S	115° 47' 16" E	
Dallah Creek	26° 9' 35" S	116° 36' 48" E	
Dallinup Creek	33° 37' 12" S	120° 41' 5" E	
Dalray Creek	27° 45' 59" S	120° 7' 29" E	
Dalton Creek	21° 19' 44" S	119° 19' 39" E	
Dalyup River	33° 46' 14" S	121° 31' 59" E	
Dalyup River West	33° 38' 17" S	121° 34' 12" E	
Damper Creek	24° 43' 56" S	115° 18' 30" E	
Damper Creek	33° 7' 6" S	116° 59' 32" E	
Damper Creek	15° 20' 37" S	126° 51' 49" E	
Damper Creek	23° 7' 10" S	115° 6' 36" E	
Dampier Creek	17° 56' 48" S	122° 14' 56" E	
Dandalup River	32° 35' 30" S	115° 51' 53" E	
Daping Brook	33° 36' 49" S	117° 42' 28" E	
Dardanup Brook	31° 51' 49" S	116° 30' 10" E	
Dardoo Creek	25° 27' 0" S	116° 9' 28" E	
Dare River	24° 50' 1" S	128° 46' 12" E	
Darganullup Brook	33° 55' 26" S	116° 27' 47" E	
Darkan Gully	33° 22' 8" S	116° 49' 12" E	
Darkin River	32° 1' 58" S	116° 15' 30" E	
Darling Dale	10° 28' 45" S	105° 33' 17" E	
Darlings Creek	29° 34' 39" S	115° 49' 29" E	
Darlington Brook	31° 54' 55" S	116° 2' 53" E	
Darlingup Gully	33° 37' 15" S	116° 45' 14" E	
Darno Creek	23° 24' 47" S	115° 19' 27" E	
Darring Brook	32° 48' 56" S	117° 17' 38" E	
Datatine Gully	33° 23' 51" S	117° 47' 57" E	
Date Palm Creek	17° 17' 49" S	128° 27' 7" E	
Daurie Creek	25° 12' 24" S	115° 31' 21" E	
Davidson Creek	23° 24' 15" S	120° 30' 42" E	
Davis Brook	32° 46' 12" S	116° 5' 51" E	
Davis Creek	24° 54' 49" S	115° 16' 15" E	
Davis Creek	29° 27' 0" S	122° 1' 1" E	
Davis River	21° 42' 46" S	121° 6' 3" E	
Dawn Creek	16° 1' 16" S	127° 0' 3" E	
Dawn Creek	32° 51' 21" S	116° 6' 59" E	
Dawrra Creek	15° 44' 52" S	126° 6' 50" E	
Dawson Creek	21° 35' 50" S	117° 6' 28" E	
Dawson Gully	33° 48' 16" S	115° 11' 57" E	
Daylight Creek	22° 2' 57" S	120° 0' 49" E	
Daymeri Creek	15° 3' 31" S	127° 42' 29" E	
De Grey River	20° 11' 54" S	119° 11' 26" E	
De La Porte Creek	22° 55' 26" S	118° 9' 1" E	
De Lancourt River	14° 40' 32" S	127° 40' 7" E	
Dead Finish Creek	17° 52' 20" S	127° 54' 20" E	
Dead Horse Creek	15° 46' 20" S	128° 17' 54" E	
Dead Horse Creek	18° 28' 34" S	126° 40' 43" E	
Dead Horse Creek	27° 55' 22" S	120° 5' 28" E	
Dead Horse Creek	23° 9' 0" S	116° 35' 58" E	
Dead Horse Creek	16° 5' 37" S	127° 17' 36" E	
Deadman Gully	34° 30' 51" S	117° 41' 52" E	
Dean Creek	24° 57' 27" S	128° 50' 17" E	
Death Adder Creek	32° 8' 38" S	116° 9' 2" E	
Debil Debil Creek	16° 43' 7" S	125° 25' 38" E	
Deception Creek	16° 23' 15" S	128° 1' 44" E	
Decies Gully	32° 33' 10" S	117° 14' 51" E	
Dedatup Brook	34° 16' 6" S	118° 23' 22" E	
Deep Creek	33° 23' 0" S	118° 25' 38" E	
Deep Creek	16° 53' 56" S	128° 10' 10" E	
Deep Creek	17° 47' 52" S	122° 38' 33" E	
Deep Gully	34° 27' 8" S	116° 4' 27" E	
Deep River	35° 0' 16" S	116° 39' 58" E	Falls into the Nornalup Inlet
Deep Valley Creek	16° 34' 21" S	124° 55' 42" E	
Dellas Creek	24° 41' 20" S	116° 11' 28" E	
Denison Creek	20° 45' 2" S	116° 58' 37" E	
Denmark River	34° 58' 14" S	117° 22' 0" E	
Depot Brook	32° 9' 18" S	116° 47' 21" E	
Depot Creek	21° 45' 8" S	121° 3' 56" E	
Desolation Creek	24° 46' 59" S	127° 57' 2" E	
Deverell Creek	24° 58' 31" S	118° 12' 8" E	
Deverell Creek North	24° 35' 36" S	118° 12' 17" E	
Devil Creek	34° 17' 52" S	119° 14' 11" E	
Devil Creek	20° 49' 39" S	116° 26' 6" E	
Devil Creek	23° 23' 54" S	116° 24' 55" E	
Devils Den Creek	32° 52' 42" S	116° 23' 50" E	
Devils Gully	34° 3' 11" S	118° 3' 18" E	
Dewar Creek	30° 12' 53" S	115° 33' 34" E	
Diamond Tree Gully	34° 23' 31" S	116° 8' 41" E	
Dickie Jones Gully	31° 42' 49" S	116° 1' 46" E	
Dicks Creek	16° 37' 41" S	128° 39' 43" E	
Diddenup Brook	34° 18' 13" S	115° 41' 5" E	
Diegul Creek	16° 22' 33" S	125° 25' 53" E	
Diggers Hill Gully	30° 57' 29" S	116° 2' 45" E	
Dillon Brook	32° 30' 42" S	116° 4' 26" E	
Dillon Creek	28° 18' 19" S	121° 45' 34" E	
Dimble Creek	25° 41' 52" S	118° 2' 46" E	
Dingo Creek	16° 43' 5" S	124° 7' 54" E	
Dingo Creek	22° 57' 5" S	117° 51' 22" E	
Dingo Creek	27° 34' 52" S	120° 41' 13" E	
Dingo Creek	16° 48' 20" S	125° 43' 10" E	
Dingo Creek	29° 8' 46" S	121° 38' 18" E	
Dingo Creek	17° 22' 7" S	125° 53' 22" E	
Dingo Creek	21° 4' 40" S	120° 0' 58" E	
Dingo Creek	23° 50' 35" S	116° 5' 14" E	
Dinner Camp Creek	16° 51' 56" S	125° 27' 1" E	
Dinner Creek	16° 32' 23" S	126° 56' 46" E	
Dinner Creek	16° 48' 14" S	128° 23' 43" E	
Dinninup Brook	33° 47' 19" S	116° 29' 48" E	
Dirk Brook	32° 24' 23" S	115° 53' 7" E	
Discovery Creek	23° 18' 24" S	115° 47' 14" E	
Divide Creek	23° 34' 0" S	118° 16' 45" E	
Divide Gully	21° 33' 10" S	119° 33' 20" E	
Djaluwon Creek	20° 20' 14" S	127° 27' 23" E	
Djanda Creek	15° 12' 24" S	127° 45' 38" E	
Djoni Creek	15° 13' 22" S	127° 55' 20" E	
Docker Creek	24° 30' 10" S	128° 38' 4" E	
Dockrell Creek	18° 42' 50" S	127° 3' 35" E	
Doctors Brook	31° 57' 19" S	116° 50' 46" E	
Doctors Creek East	17° 11' 23" S	123° 38' 27" E	
Doctors Creek West	17° 11' 42" S	123° 38' 11" E	
Dodger Creek	28° 44' 36" S	121° 18' 2" E	
Dog Chain Creek	17° 9' 56" S	125° 14' 18" E	
Doggerup Creek	34° 46' 37" S	115° 58' 40" E	
Dolbys Gully	28° 40' 6" S	114° 38' 9" E	
Dolgahroo Creek	25° 38' 16" S	122° 21' 15" E	
Dolugup Brook	33° 34' 55" S	115° 5' 32" E	
Dolyou Creek	25° 40' 17" S	122° 39' 32" E	
Dombakup Brook	34° 34' 35" S	115° 58' 29" E	
Dominic Creek	14° 13' 33" S	126° 41' 32" E	
Don Creek	18° 51' 35" S	124° 57' 18" E	
Donald Creek	23° 18' 20" S	115° 14' 27" E	
Donald Creek	23° 41' 34" S	116° 12' 40" E	
Donald River	20° 44' 47" S	115° 28' 15" E	
Dongolocking Creek	33° 24' 21" S	117° 45' 47" E	
Donkey Creek	16° 42' 26" S	125° 34' 29" E	
Donkey Creek	16° 15' 14" S	128° 17' 8" E	
Donkey Creek	29° 37' 13" S	115° 17' 34" E	
Donkey Creek	15° 41' 12" S	126° 25' 17" E	
Donnelly River	34° 29' 5" S	115° 40' 17" E	
Doodenoo Creek	30° 30' 55" S	115° 34' 3" E	
Dookanelly Gully	32° 59' 3" S	116° 13' 23" E	
Doolgarrie Creek	23° 24' 18" S	116° 28' 21" E	
Doombup Creek	33° 48' 52" S	122° 2' 44" E	
Doorawarrah Creek	23° 42' 21" S	115° 26' 31" E	
Dora Creek	16° 26' 23" S	125° 35' 22" E	
Dora Creek	17° 12' 39" S	126° 15' 55" E	
Doradine Gully	33° 15' 43" S	117° 50' 46" E	
Dorakin Gully	31° 58' 0" S	117° 29' 31" E	
Doris Creek	28° 8' 32" S	122° 18' 47" E	
Dort Creek	33° 45' 15" S	117° 18' 42" E	
Double Brook	34° 15' 34" S	115° 42' 25" E	
Double Creek	27° 39' 41" S	119° 30' 14" E	
Double Strain Creek	16° 27' 12" S	128° 51' 49" E	
Doweranin Creek	24° 40' 15" S	116° 11' 56" E	
Dowies Creek	31° 52' 43" S	116° 10' 9" E	
Dowitba Creek	16° 37' 36" S	125° 24' 45" E	
Drake Creek	34° 50' 50" S	117° 16' 3" E	
Drakes Brook	32° 51' 31" S	115° 55' 30" E	
Drip Creek	18° 23' 24" S	123° 9' 28" E	
Dromaius Creek	15° 59' 58" S	126° 54' 5" E	
Drum Creek	15° 5' 55" S	126° 8' 21" E	
Dry Brook	34° 47' 22" S	117° 59' 39" E	
The Dry Brook	33° 58' 34" S	115° 45' 58" E	
Dry Creek	16° 39' 19" S	128° 43' 23" E	
Drysdale River	13° 56' 17" S	126° 48' 55" E	
Du Boulay Creek	21° 1' 38" S	116° 8' 1" E	
Dubaut Creek	25° 51' 57" S	113° 43' 25" E	
Duck Creek	22° 35' 17" S	115° 56' 5" E	
Duck Hole Creek	18° 29' 17" S	125° 22' 41" E	
Duckhole Creek	17° 13' 11" S	125° 52' 36" E	
Dudijup Creek	34° 7' 44" S	116° 15' 5" E	
Dudinyillup Gully	33° 49' 47" S	115° 55' 9" E	
Duerdin Creek	18° 27' 54" S	127° 59' 10" E	
Duffer Creek	21° 5' 54" S	119° 45' 14" E	
Duke Creek	33° 53' 30" S	122° 35' 35" E	
Duleep Creek	33° 57' 42" S	119° 1' 9" E	
Dullagabbie Creek	28° 11' 7" S	117° 30' 36" E	
Dumpling Gully	33° 50' 35" S	116° 1' 3" E	
Dundagee Creek	23° 39' 35" S	116° 15' 47" E	
Dunedale Creek	15° 38' 44" S	124° 43' 55" E	
Dungaroo Creek	30° 36' 14" S	116° 16' 10" E	
Dunham River	15° 46' 26" S	128° 41' 13" E	
Dunn Creek	22° 34' 31" S	122° 15' 25" E	
Durack River	15° 36' 30" S	127° 50' 34" E	
Durawah Gully	28° 33' 51" S	114° 45' 20" E	
Durbai Creek	20° 0' 38" S	127° 32' 51" E	
Durlacher Creek	23° 58' 16" S	116° 4' 53" E	
Dwalganup Brook	33° 59' 49" S	116° 28' 26" E	
Dwarderdine Gully	32° 46' 49" S	116° 39' 25" E	
Dwellingerup Brook	32° 45' 31" S	116° 3' 19" E	
Dyason Creek	17° 28' 36" S	125° 12' 52" E	
Dyke Creek	21° 7' 50" S	120° 9' 6" E	
