= List of watercourses in Western Australia =

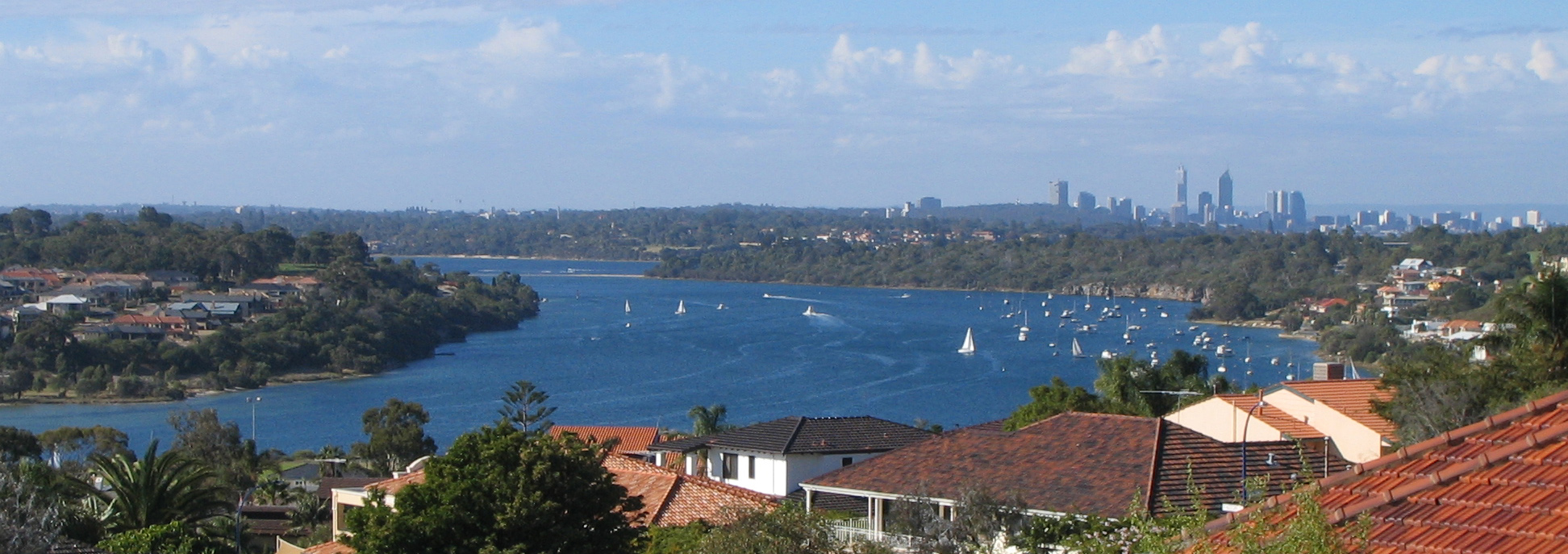
Swan River, Perth

Western Australia has many watercourses with gazetted names, including rivers, streams, brooks, creeks, gullies, anabranches and backwaters.

This list is complete with respect to the 1996 Gazetteer of Australia. Dubious names have been checked against the online 2004 data, and in all cases confirmed correct. However, if any watercourses have been gazetted or deleted since 1996, this list does not reflect these changes. Strictly speaking, Australian place names are gazetted in capital letters only; the names in this list have been converted to mixed case in accordance with normal capitalisation conventions. Locations are as gazetted; some watercourses may extend over long distances.

- List of watercourses in Western Australia, 0-9
- List of watercourses in Western Australia, A
- List of watercourses in Western Australia, B
- List of watercourses in Western Australia, C
- List of watercourses in Western Australia, D
- List of watercourses in Western Australia, E-H
- List of watercourses in Western Australia, I-L
- List of watercourses in Western Australia, M
- List of watercourses in Western Australia, N-Q
- List of watercourses in Western Australia, R-S
- List of watercourses in Western Australia, T-V
- List of watercourses in Western Australia, W-Z

== See also ==
- Geography of Western Australia
