= Backwater (river) =

River section with little or no current

A backwater is a relatively stagnant part of a river in which there is little or no current. It can refer to a small anabranch of a main river, which diverges from and meanders alongside the main stem before rejoining it downstreams, and thus carrying a significantly weaker flow; or an ectopic stream pool extend from the side of a watercourse backed up by reverse flow from tides (as in the case of tidal rivers) or due to increased flow resistance caused by obstacles such as a weir, dam or levee. Temporary natural obstructions such as ice jams, vegetation blockages, rockslides, debris flow, beaver damming or "backlogging" due to downstream flooding (e.g. due to a storm surge) can also create backwaters.

== Alternative channel ==
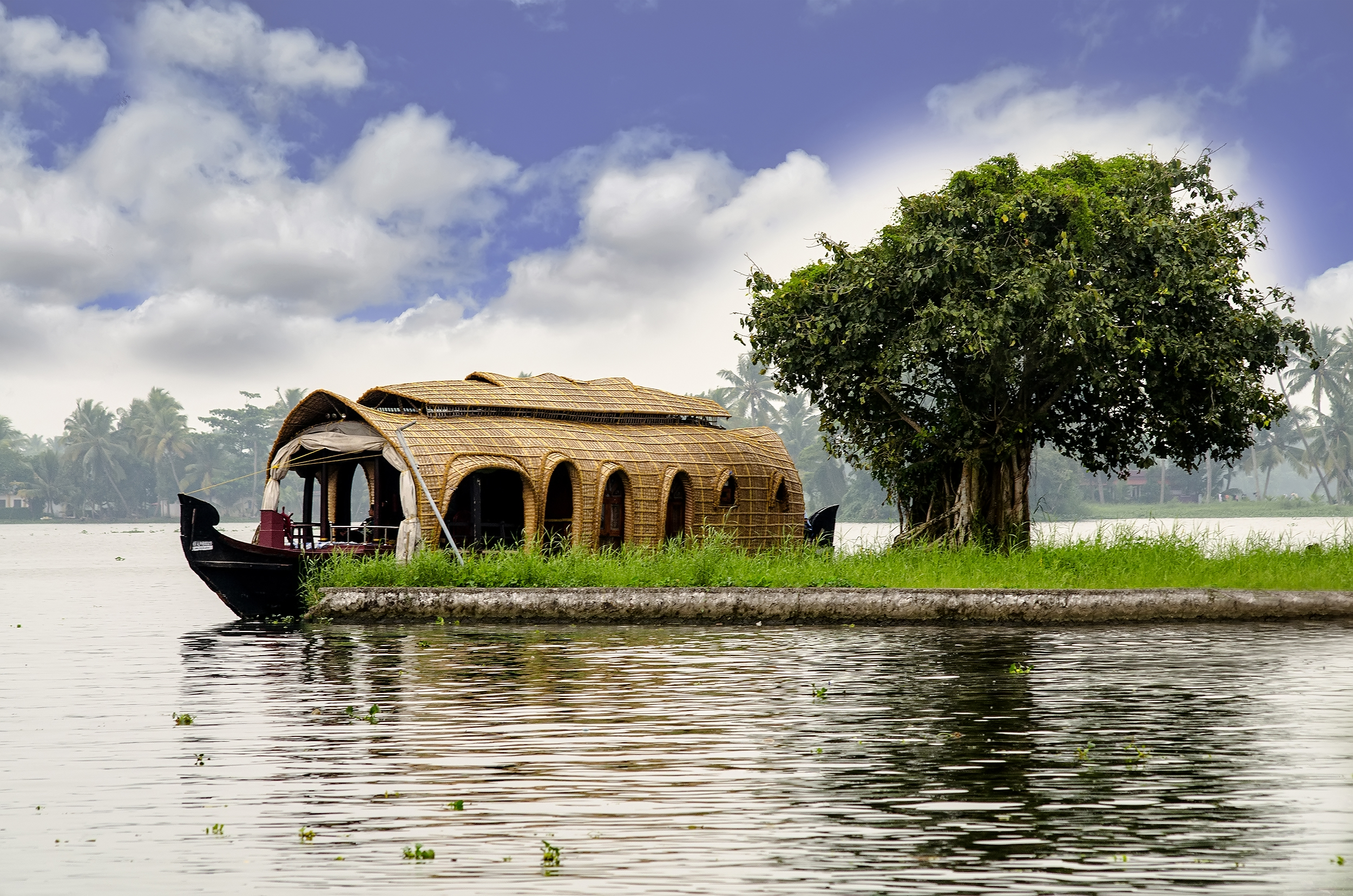
A Kerala houseboat in Kumarakom, India

If a river has developed one or more alternative courses in its evolution, one channel is usually designated the main course, and secondary channels may be termed backwaters. The main river course will usually have the fastest stream and will likely be the main navigation route; backwaters may be shallower and flow more slowly, if at all. Some backwaters are rich in mangrove forest. This results in a more diverse environment of scientific interest and worthy of preservation. Backwaters also provide opportunities for leisure activities such as canoeing and fishing.

The term has been applied as a metaphor to physical and social areas that have been bypassed. It may apply to places that have been neglected in economic development, or in the expression a "cultural backwater".

== Water backed up by an obstruction ==
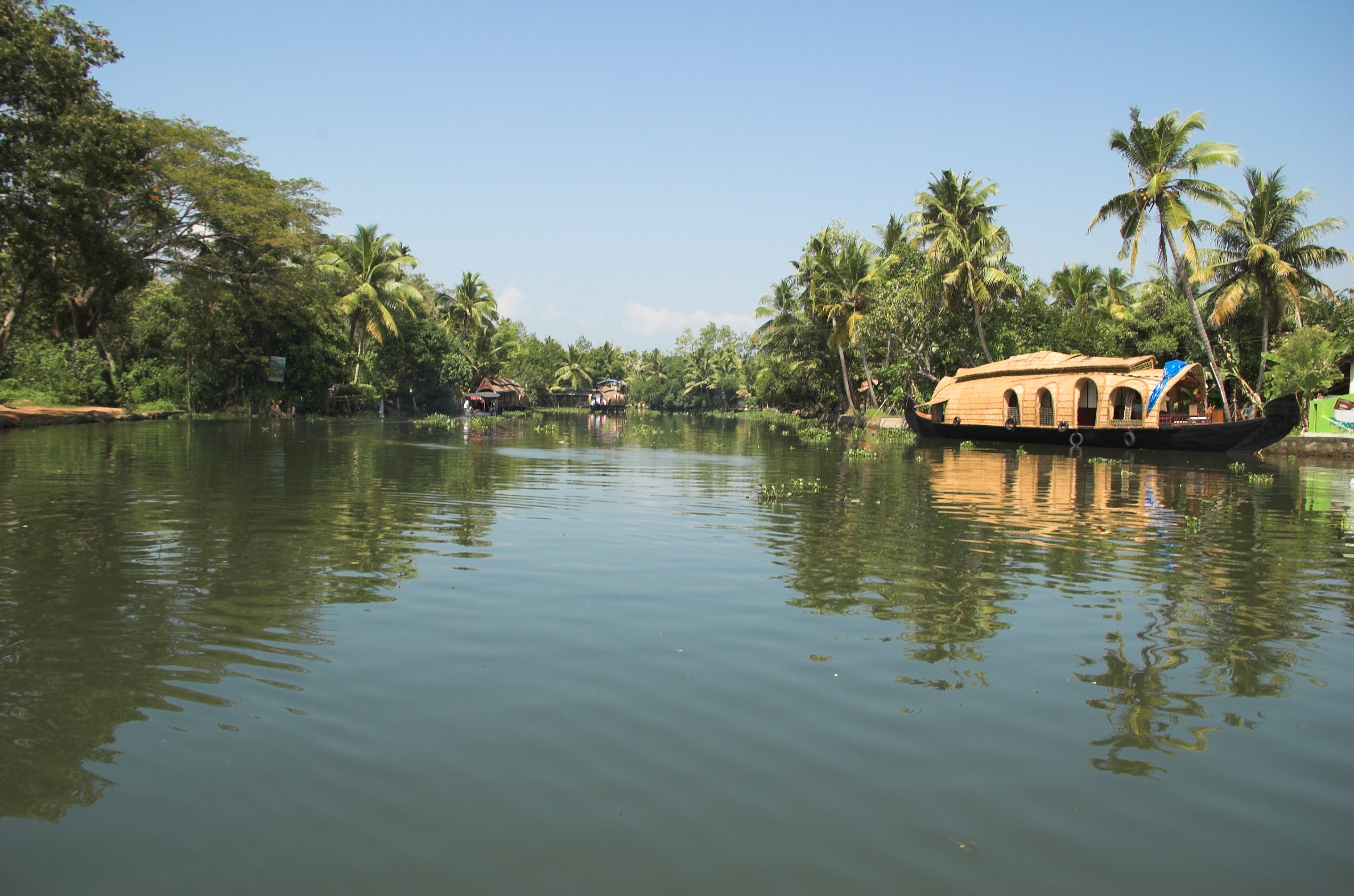
Kumarakom lake in Kerala backwaters

When a section of a river is near the coast or another feature that sets its base level, the section influenced by the conditions at its mouth is termed a backwater. If a river flows into a lake or sea, it is the region in which the slope of the river decreases because the lower water flux permitted at the mouth causes the water to back up. Where the river outlet is strongly affected by tides, the cyclic change in base level changes the portion of the river that is a backwater. As a result, fresh and salt water may become mixed to form an estuarine environment.

== See also ==
- Distributary
- Lagoon
- Kerala backwaters
