= Gazetteer of Australia =

Dictionary of location and spelling of geographical names in Australia

The Gazetteer of Australia is an index or dictionary of the location and spelling of geographical names across Australia. Geographic names include towns, suburbs and roads, plus geographical features such as hills, rivers, and lakes.

The index is compiled by the Intergovernmental Committee on Surveying and Mapping (ICSM) from determinations made by state, territory, and Australian government agencies.

The authorities that work on geographic names in Australia are as follows:

- Australian Capital Territory - National Memorials Committee - National Memorials Ordinance 1928
- New South Wales - Geographical Names Board of New South Wales - Geographical Names Act, 1966
- Northern Territory - Place Names Committee for the Northern Territory - Place Names Act 1978
- Queensland - Department of Natural Resources and Mines manages Queensland place names - Queensland Place Names Act 1988
- South Australia - Geographical Names Board of South Australia - Act 101 1969
- Tasmania - Nomenclature Board of Tasmania - Survey Co-ordination Act 1944 amendments of 1955 and 1964
- Victoria - Place Names Committee - Survey Co-ordination (Place Names) Act 1965, updated to Geographic Place Names Act 1998
- Western Australia - Geographic Names Committee - Land Administration Act 1997 (originally the Nomenclature Advisory Committee, appointed in 1936)

As of January 2012, there are 370,000 place names in Australia. These are searchable in an online database hosted by Geoscience Australia and the entire data set can be downloaded here.

== See also ==
- Committee for Geographical Names in Australasia
- Suburbs and localities (Australia)
