= Perth County, Western Australia =

Coordinates: 31°49′S 116°00′E

Perth
- Cadastral division
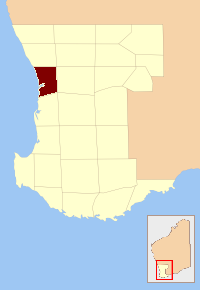
- Location in Western Australia
- Country: Australia
- State: Western Australia
Lands administrative divisions around Perth
| Indian Ocean | Twiss | Victoria |
| Indian Ocean | Perth | York |
| Indian Ocean | Murray | Grantham |

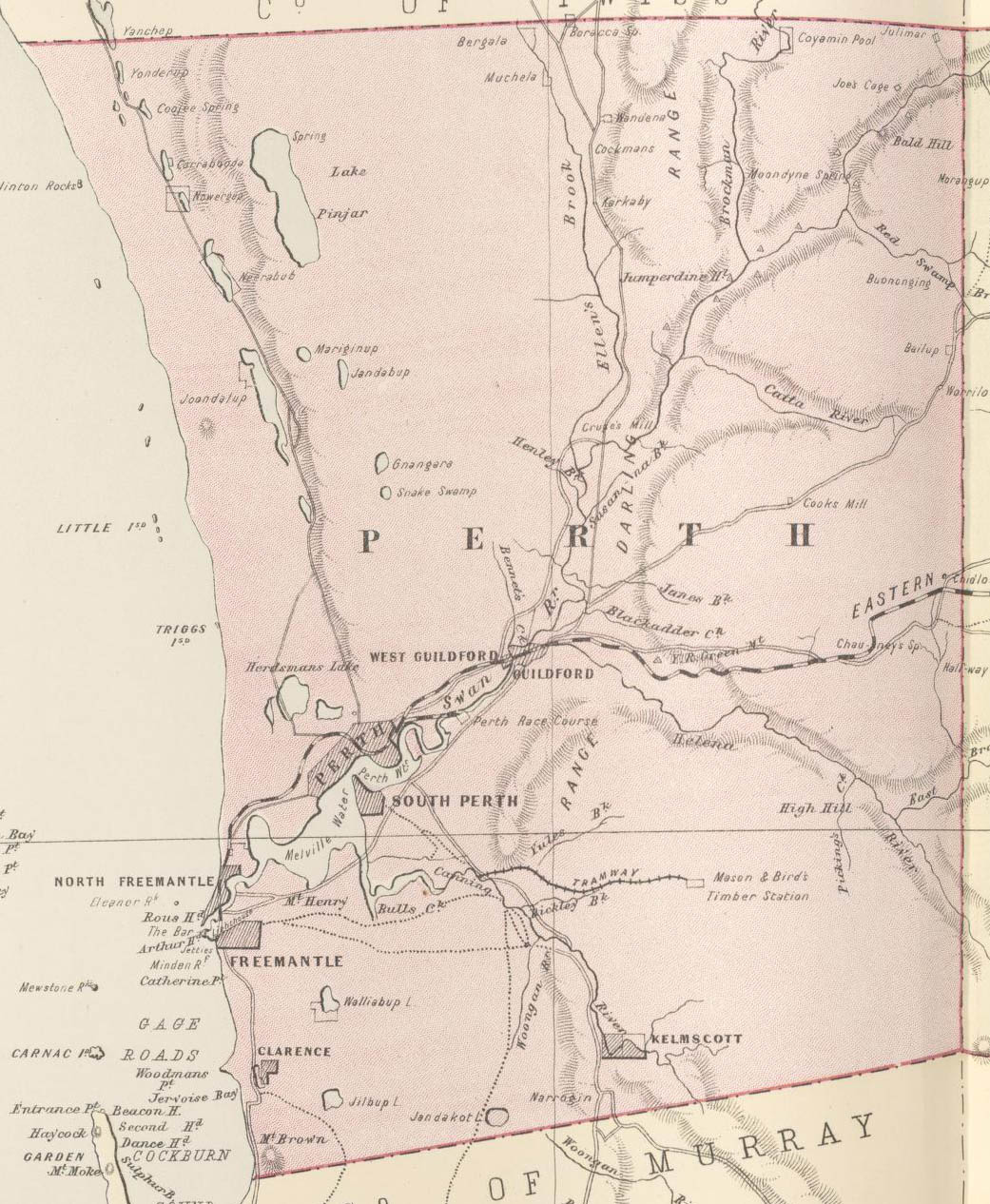
Map of Perth County in 1886

The County of Perth was one of the 26 counties of Western Australia that were designated in 1829. It contained the city of Perth, with its south-eastern corner near Mount Dale. It was part of the Lands administrative divisions of Western Australia. Today, land titles in the area are associated with the Swan, Canning or Cockburn Sound land districts.
