= County Peak =

Mountain in Western Australia

Coordinates: 32.19829°S 117.17717°E

County Peak, also known as Mount Quajabin and Quajabin Peak, is located in the western zone of the Wheatbelt region of Western Australia, about 120 kilometres (75 mi) south-east of Perth.

Quajabin is this mountain's Noongar Aboriginal name, which predates European settlement, and is derived from the word quabin, meaning 'good camp'.

Although not high, it offers an impressive view over some of the upper catchment of the Avon River and also of the Yenyenning Lakes, taking in points of seven shires: Beverley, Brookton, Pingelly, Corrigin, Quairading, Kellerberrin and York.

County Peak was given its English name when the first surveyors drew up the original counties for the Swan River Colony in 1829. County Peak was at that time the geographical intersection of Howick County, Minto County, Grantham County and York County. Today these counties have been divided up into local government areas known as shires.

The area was first settled by Europeans in 1898 by the pioneering McLean brothers Kenneth, Donald Jr., John and Thomas. The McLean brothers cleared land in the area, selecting their land including County Peak, using as their guide tree lines indicating rich, fertile soil as payment for their labour. From 1910 to 1933 the County Peak School taught children of the settlers in the district.
