= Roe Land District =

Coordinates: 32°35′S 119°00′E

Roe Western Australia
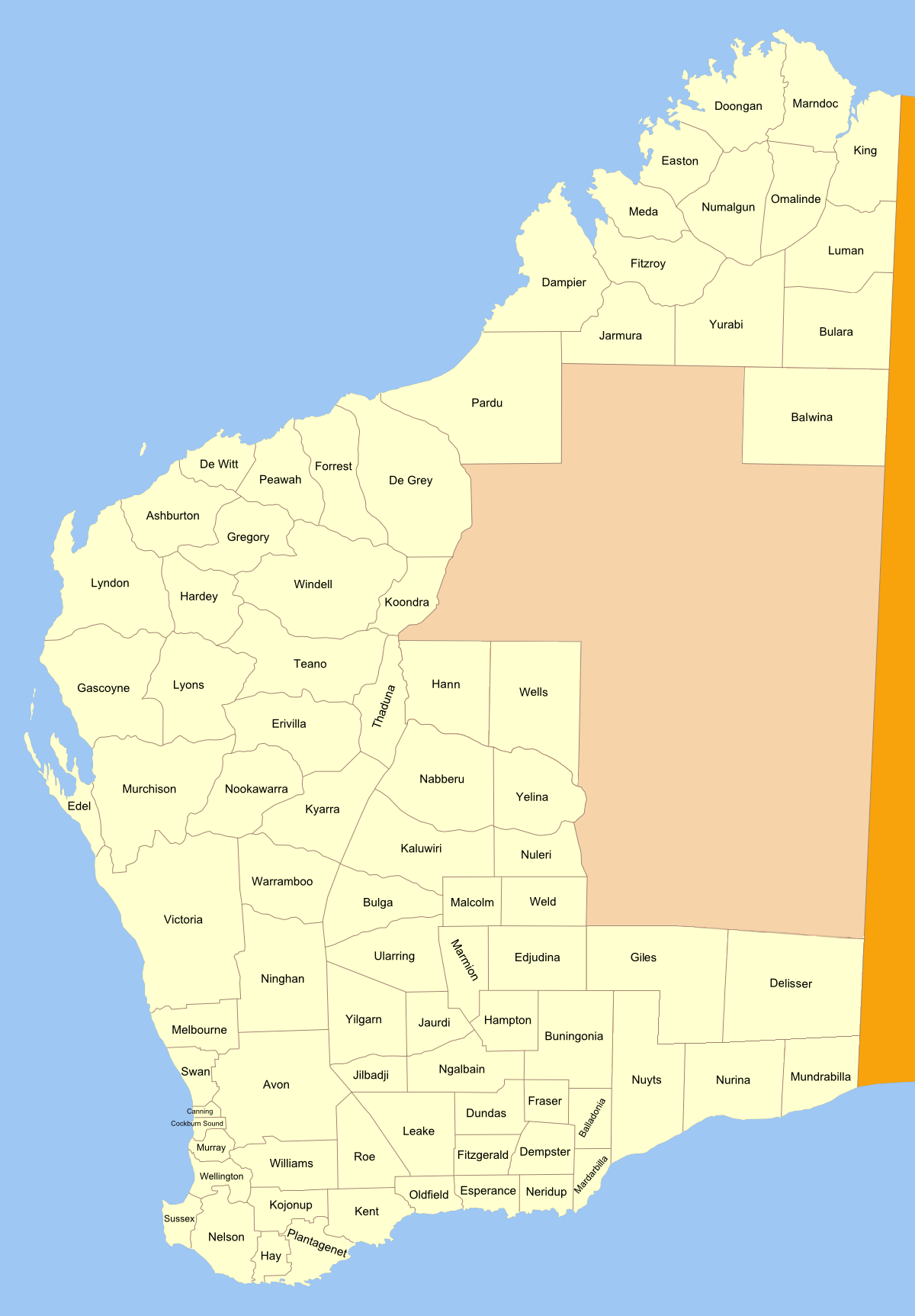
Lands administrative divisions around Roe:
Avon	Jilbadji	Leake
Williams	Roe	Leake
Kojonup	Kent	Oldfield

Roe Land District is a land district (cadastral division) of Western Australia, located within the South-West Land Division in the eastern Wheatbelt region of the state.

== History ==
The district was created on 9 August 1899, named in honour of the first Surveyor General of Western Australia, John Septimus Roe, and was defined in the Government Gazette:

Bounded on the North by the South boundary of the Yilgarn Goldfield, being a West line from a point situate 90 miles South from survey mark H. 26 on Koorarawalyee Granit Rock; on the West by a prolongation South of the West boundary of said Goldfield (said boundary being a North and South line through a point situate 10 miles West of the Cairn on Yorkrakine Granite Rock); on the South by an East line from a point situate East from the North-East corner of Kojonup Location 268, and on the East by a North line through Mount Madden to the latitude of Mount Ridley (33°17'38"S), an East line towards Mount Ridley, and a North line towards aforesaid survey mark H. 26 and Koorarawalyee Granite Rock.

== Towns ==
- Buniche (Shire of Lake Grace)
- Holt Rock (Shire of Kulin)
- Hyden (Shire of Kondinin)
- Karlgarin (Shire of Kondinin)
- Lake Biddy (Shire of Lake Grace)
- Lake Camm (Shire of Lake Grace)
- Lake King (Shire of Lake Grace)
- Mount Walker (Shire of Narembeen)
- Newdegate (Shire of Lake Grace)
- Pingaring (Shire of Kulin)
- Varley (Shire of Lake Grace)
