= Wellington Land District, Western Australia =

Wellington Western Australia
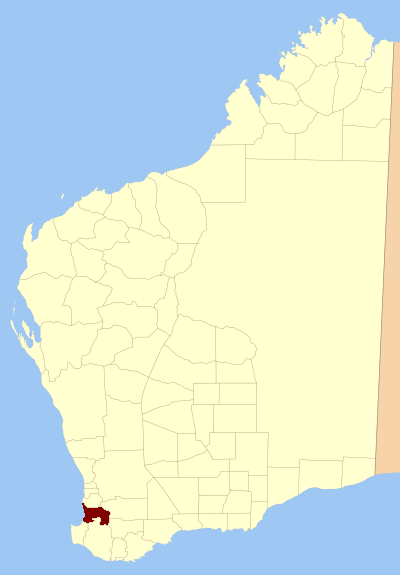
- Location in Western Australia
Lands administrative divisions around Wellington:
| Indian Ocean | Murray | Williams |
| Indian Ocean | Wellington | Williams |
| Sussex | Nelson | Kojonup |

Wellington Land District is a land district (cadastral division) of Western Australia, located within the South-West Land Division on the state's west coast. It spans roughly 32°56'S – 33°40'S in latitude and 115°25'E – 116°50'E in longitude.

== History ==
The system of land districts came together in an ad hoc fashion, and the Wellington district started to be subdivided in 1835 well before any thought was given to formally defining its boundaries. The definition later used by the Lands and Surveys department came from an 1862 gazettal which read as follows:

Bounded on the West by the sea-coast; on the North by an East line from the said coast to the River Murray passing through the summit of Mount William, then the Murray and Williams Rivers upwards (exclusive of the licenses and locations on either bank of each) to Bannister townsite on the Williams; and on the South by an East line from the seacoast to Capel River through the North end of Wonnerup Inlet, then by said river upwards to location 171 (inclusive), then by a South-easterly line to junction of Padbury Brook with the River Blackwood, then by the Blackwood upwards to its junction with Balgarrup River; and on the East by an indefinite line.

== Location and features ==
The district is located on the Indian Ocean coast, roughly centred on the city of Bunbury and extending north to Yarloop, east to Darkan and south to just past both Capel and Donnybrook.

== Towns and areas ==
=== Towns ===
The Wellington district contains the following current or former townsites:

| Townsite | Coordinates | Gazetted | Notes |
|---|---|---|---|
| Bunbury | 33.340°S 115.642°E | 1841 | |
| Allanson | 33.338°S 116.099°E | 1907 | "West Collie" until 1916 |
| Binningup | 33.149°S 115.689°E | 1963 | |
| Boolading | 33.354°S 116.631°E | 1909 | |
| Bowelling | 33.420°S 116.485°E | 1908 | |
| Boyanup | 33.486°S 115.728°E | 1894 | |
| Brunswick Junction | 33.256°S 115.840°E | 1898* | Private town; not gazetted |
| Burekup | 33.311°S 115.809°E | 1910* | Private town; not gazetted |
| Capel | 33.556°S 115.558°E | 1897 | "Coolingup" until 1899 |
| Capercup | 33.522°S 116.741°E | 1916 | Cancelled in 1991 |
| Collie | 33.354°S 116.152°E | 1897 | "Colliefields" in 1898–99 |
| Collie Burn | 33.401°S 116.193°E | 1907 | |
| Collie Cardiff | 33.429°S 116.208°E | 1916 | |
| Cookernup | 32.994°S 115.893°E | 1894 | |
| Cordering | 33.499°S 116.661°E | 1916 | |
| Dardanup | 33.399°S 115.754°E | 1923 | |
| Darkan | 33.338°S 116.743°E | 1906 | |
| Donnybrook | 33.577°S 115.821°E | 1894 | |
| Duranillin | 33.516°S 116.802°E | 1918 | |
| Eaton | 33.314°S 115.712°E | 1988 | |
| Ferguson | 33.445°S 115.849°E | | |
| Gungup | 33.616°S 115.826°E | 1905 | Cancelled in 1918 |
| Gwindinup | 33.508°S 115.742°E | 1909 | |
| Harvey | 33.078°S 115.894°E | 1893* | Private town; not gazetted |
| Lake Clifton | 32.787°S 115.671°E | 1921 | |
| Moodiarrup | 33.609°S 116.807°E | 1909 | |
| Muja | 33.405°S 116.337°E | 1973 | |
| Mungalup | 33.395°S 116.101°E | 1906 | |
| Myalup | 33.102°S 115.694°E | 1972 | |
| Newlands | 33.669°S 115.879°E | 1907 | |
| Nittarni | 33.454°S 115.897°E | | Wellington Mills. Cancelled 1965. |
| Noggerup | 33.580°S 116.160°E | 1909 | |
| Preston | 33.538°S 116.014°E | 1899 | |
| Preston Beach | 32.877°S 115.658°E | 1975 | "Yalgorup" until 1989 |
| Roelands | 33.292°S 115.829°E | 1963 | |
| Shotts | 33.383°S 116.272°E | 1917 | |
| Warawarrup | 33.014°S 115.893°E | 1917 | Cancelled in 1964. |
| Worsley | 33.307°S 116.007°E | 1909 | |
| Yalup Brook | 32.899°S 115.904°E | 1914 | |
| Yarloop | 32.955°S 115.901°E | 1962 | |

=== Agricultural areas ===
Under the Land Act 1898, the Agricultural Lands Purchase Act 1896, and preceding regulations, it was open to the Governor to declare agricultural areas on crown land or repurchased estates on private land, to which special provisions applied for both alienation and improvement. Many of these estates came into being shortly after World War I for the purposes of soldier resettlement.

| Name | Coordinates | Gazetted | Notes |
|---|---|---|---|
| Boyanup A.A. | 33.532°S 115.651°E | 1891 | |
| Brunswick Estate | 33.229°S 115.810°E | 1907 | Near Brunswick Junction |
| Clifton Estate | 33.288°S 115.777°E | 1898 | Near Brunswick Junction |
| Collie A.A. | 33.350°S 115.733°E | 1891 | |
| Dardanup Estate | 33.387°S 115.765°E | 1923 | |
| Darkan A.A. | 33.352°S 116.732°E | 1891 | |
| Harvey A.A. | 33.013°S 115.866°E | 1891 | |
| Henty Estate | 33.349°S 115.768°E | 1919 | Near Waterloo |
| Homebush Estate | 32.973°S 115.888°E | 1901 | Near Cookernup |
| Korijekup Estate | 33.036°S 115.877°E | 1921 | Near Harvey |
| Preston A.A. | 33.591°S 115.951°E | 1892 | |
| Roseneath Estate | | 1921 | South of Collie |
| Uduc A.A. | 33.090°S 115.823°E | 1894 | Near Harvey |
| Upper Capel Estate | 33.649°S 115.819°E | 1919 | Near Kirup |
