= North West Division =

North West Division may refer to:

- The North-West Land Division, a cadastral division of Western Australia
- The North West Division of the High Court of South Africa, commonly known as the North West High Court, a superior court of law in Mahikeng, South Africa
