= Wicklow County =

Wicklow County may refer to:

- County Wicklow, Ireland
- Wicklow County, Queensland
- Wicklow County, Western Australia
