= Perth County =

Perth County may refer to:

- Perth County, Ontario
- Perth County, Western Australia (old cadastral unit in Australia)
- Perthshire, a historic county in Scotland, UK
