= Lanark County, Western Australia =

Coordinates: 34°33′S 116°04′E

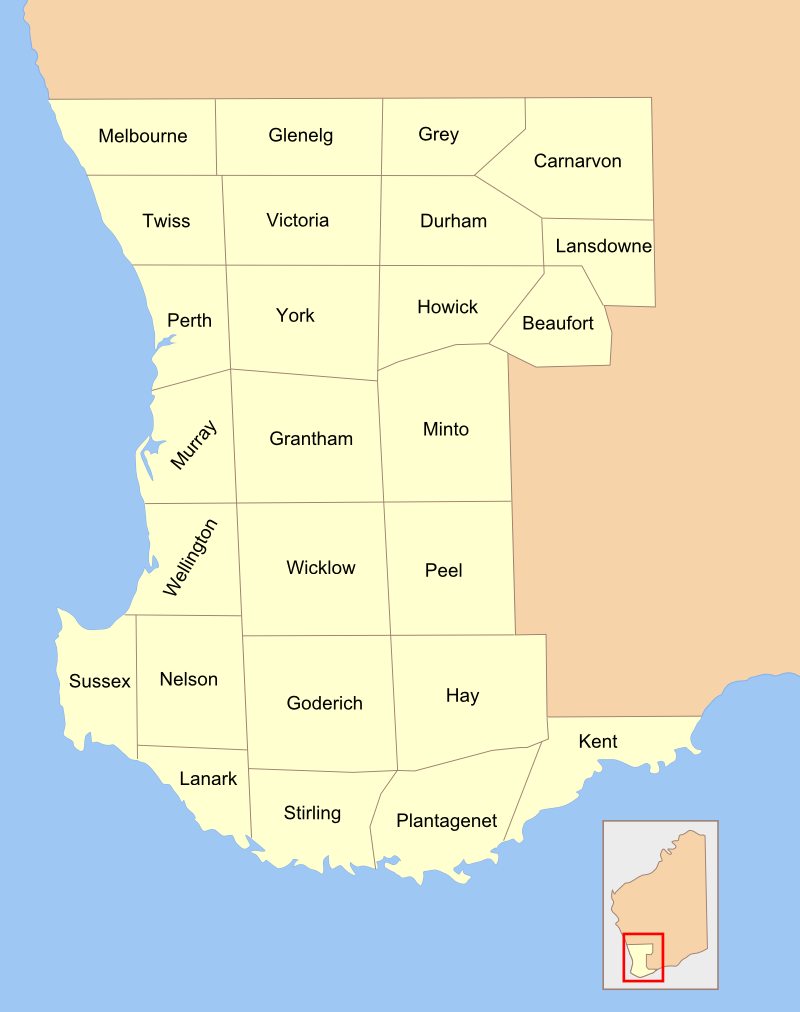
26 counties of Western Australia

Lanark County was one of the 26 counties of Western Australia that were designated in 1829 as cadastral divisions. It was named after the County of Lanark, Scotland, birthplace of Lieutenant-Governor James Stirling.

It approximately corresponds to the southern part of the Nelson Land District which forms the basis for land titles in the area.
