= Peel County, Western Australia =

Coordinates: 33°22′S 117°47′E

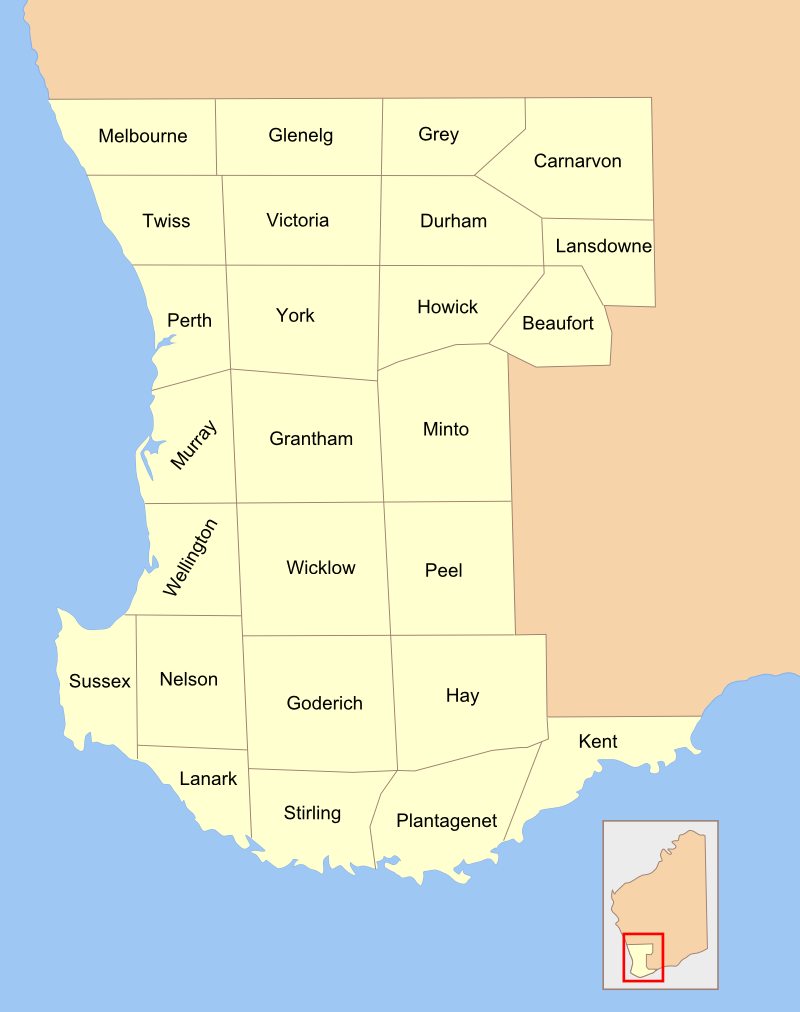
26 counties of Western Australia

Peel County was one of the 26 counties of Western Australia that were designated in 1829 as cadastral divisions. It was named after Sir Robert Peel, Home Secretary from 1822–1827, and Home Secretary and Leader of the House of Commons from 1828–1830.

It approximately corresponds to the eastern part of the Williams Land District which forms the basis for land titles in the area.
