= Windell =

- Windell Land District
- Windell D. Middlebrooks, American film and television actor
- Terry Windell, American film director
- Windell Gabriels

== See also ==
- Windells
