= Glenelg =

Glenelg may refer to

== Places ==
=== Australia ===
- Glenelg, South Australia, a beachside suburb of Adelaide
- Glenelg River (Victoria)
- Glenelg River (Western Australia)
- Glenelg County, Western Australia, a former county
- Shire of Glenelg, Victoria
- Shire of Glenelg (former), Victoria, abolished in 1994
- City of Glenelg, a local government area in South Australia
- Electoral district of Glenelg (South Australia), a former district of the South Australian House of Assembly
- Electoral district of Glenelg (Victoria), a former district of the Victorian Legislative Assembly

=== Canada ===
- Glenelg Parish, New Brunswick, Canada
- Glenelg, Nova Scotia, Canada, a community
- Glenelg, Ontario, Canada, a former township which was merged into West Grey township

=== Elsewhere ===
- Glenelg, Highland, Scotland, a community area and civil parish
- Glenelg, Maryland, United States, an unincorporated community
- Glenelg, Mars

== Sports ==
- Glenelg Baseball Club, a member of the South Australian Baseball League
- Glenelg Cricket Club, a cricket team based in Adelaide
- Glenelg Football Club, an Australian rules football team based in Glenelg East, South Australia
- Glenelg Golf Club, a private golf club in the Adelaide suburb of Novar Gardens
- Glenelg Tigers (NBL), a defunct basketball team based in Glenelg, South Australia
- Glenelg Oval, a sports stadium in Adelaide, South Australia
- Glenelg (horse), a British-American Thoroughbred racehorse

== Other uses ==
- Charles Grant, 1st Baron Glenelg (1778–1866), Scottish politician and colonial administrator
- two ships of the Royal Australian Navy:
  - HMAS Glenelg (J236), a corvette commissioned in 1942
  - HMAS Glenelg (ACPB 96), a patrol boat commissioned in 2008
- Glenelg tram line, Adelaide, South Australia
- Glenelg Highway, a highway in south-eastern Australia
- Glenelg High School, Maryland, United States
- Glenelg Country School, a nonsectarian, co-educational independent day school in Howard County, Maryland

== See also ==
- Glenelg East, South Australia, a suburb of Adelaide
- Glenelg North, South Australia, a suburb of Adelaide
- Glenelg South, South Australia, a suburb of Adelaide
- Glen Elg, a character from Phoenix Wright: Ace Attorney − Trials and Tribulations, a game in the Ace Attorney series for Nintendo DS
