= Sussex County, Western Australia =

County of Western Australia

Coordinates: 34°00′S 115°20′E

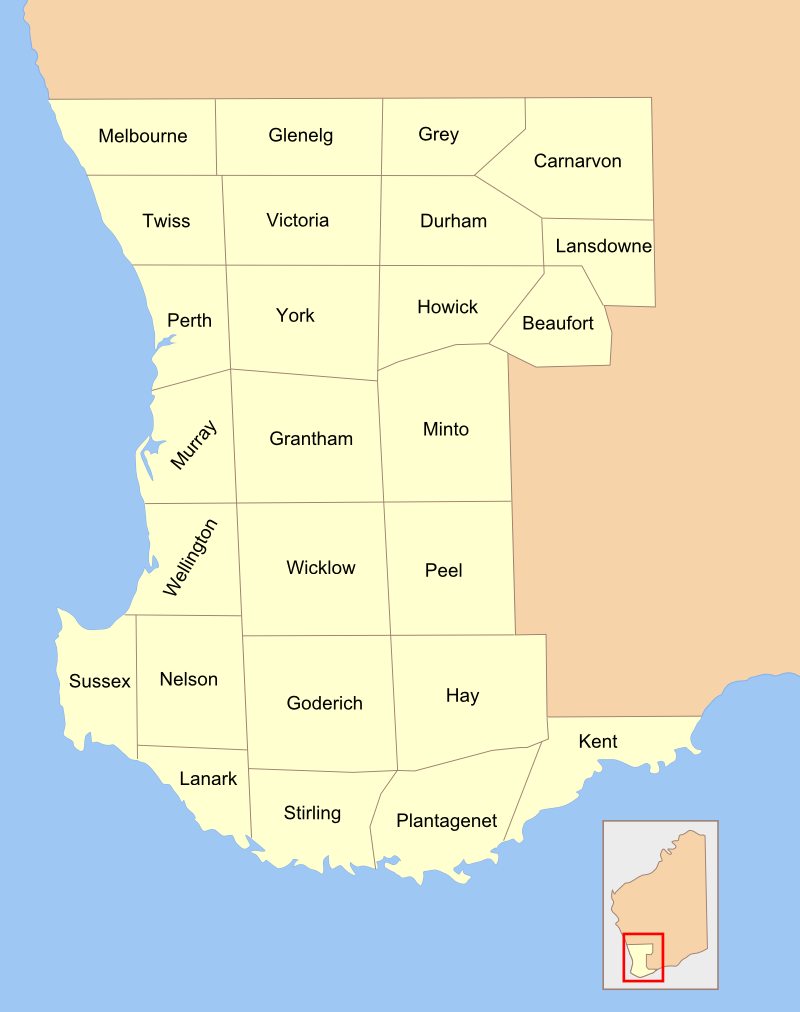
26 counties of Western Australia

Sussex County was one of the 26 counties of Western Australia that were designated in 1829 as cadastral divisions. Lieutenant-Governor James Stirling named the county in honour of Prince Augustus Frederick, Duke of Sussex, the sixth son of George III.

It approximately corresponds to the modern-day Sussex Land District which forms the basis for land titles in the area.
