= Wellington County =

Wellington County may refer to:

- Wellington County, New South Wales, Australia
- Wellington Land District, Tasmania, Australia
- Wellington County, Western Australia, Australia
- Wellington County, Ontario, Canada
