= Kent County =

Kent County may refer to:

== Australia ==
- the former name of Kent Land District, Tasmania, Australia
- Kent County, Western Australia

== Canada ==
- Kent County, New Brunswick
- Kent County, Ontario

== United Kingdom ==
- The County of Kent

== United States ==
- Kent County, Delaware
- Kent County, Maryland
- Kent County, Michigan
- Kent County, Rhode Island
- Kent County, Texas
- New Kent County, Virginia
