= County of Carnarvon =

County of Carnarvon may refer to:

- Caernarfonshire, Wales, United Kingdom
- Carnarvon County, Western Australia
- County of Carnarvon (South Australia)
