= Durham County, Western Australia =

Coordinates: 31°18′S 117°47′E

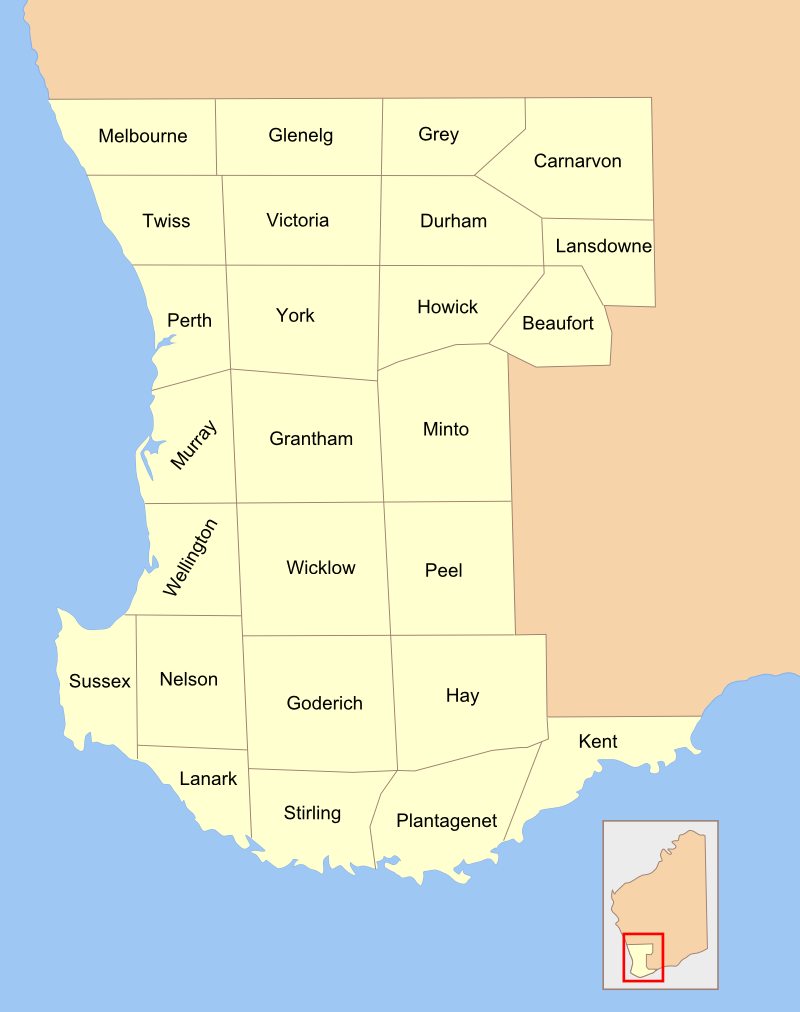
26 counties of Western Australia

Durham County was one of the 26 counties of Western Australia that were designated in 1829 as cadastral divisions. It was named after Baron Durham, a British Whig statesman. His father-in-law was Earl Grey (Grey County, Western Australia). It approximately corresponds to the north-eastern part of the Avon Land District which forms the basis for land titles in the area.
