= Beaufort County =

Beaufort County may refer to:

In Australia

- Beaufort County, Western Australia

in the United States

- Beaufort County, North Carolina
- Beaufort County, South Carolina
