= South West Division =

The South West Division may refer to:

- South West Land Division, a cadastral division of Western Australia
- Queensland Rugby League South West Division
- English Rugby Union South West Division
