= Gascoyne Land Division =

Land division of Western Australia

Coordinates: 25°15′S 116°35′E

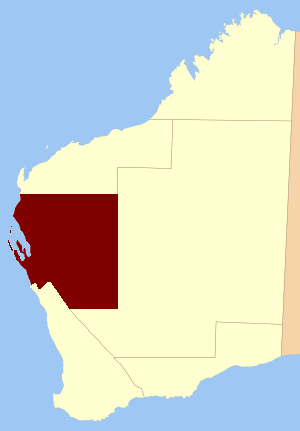
Location of Gascoyne division in Western Australia

Gascoyne Land Division was a land division of Western Australia defined under the Land Regulations of 2 March 1887. It included almost all of the modern Gascoyne region of the State. In the Land Act 1898, it was renamed Western to avoid confusion with the Gascoyne Land District which had just been created by the Department of Lands and Surveys, and on 1 February 1907, section 26 of the Land Act Amendment Act 1906 merged it into North-West Land Division.

It was defined thus in the Land Regulations in 1887:

Bounded on the south by the Murchison River, from its mouth at Gantheaume Bay upwards to Bompas Hill at the Great Northern bend of said River, thence south-easterly along the eastern boundary of the South-West Division, and thence by an east line to the 119th meridian of east longitude from Greenwich, passing through a spot ten miles south of Mugga Mugga Hill; on the east by a north line along the aforesaid 119th meridian of east longitude; on the north by a west line to the seacoast, passing through a spot thirty miles south of Mt. Alexander on the Ashburton River; and on the west by the sea-coast, including all Islands adjacent.
