= Koondra Land District =

Coordinates: 22°55′S 120°30′E

Koondra Western Australia
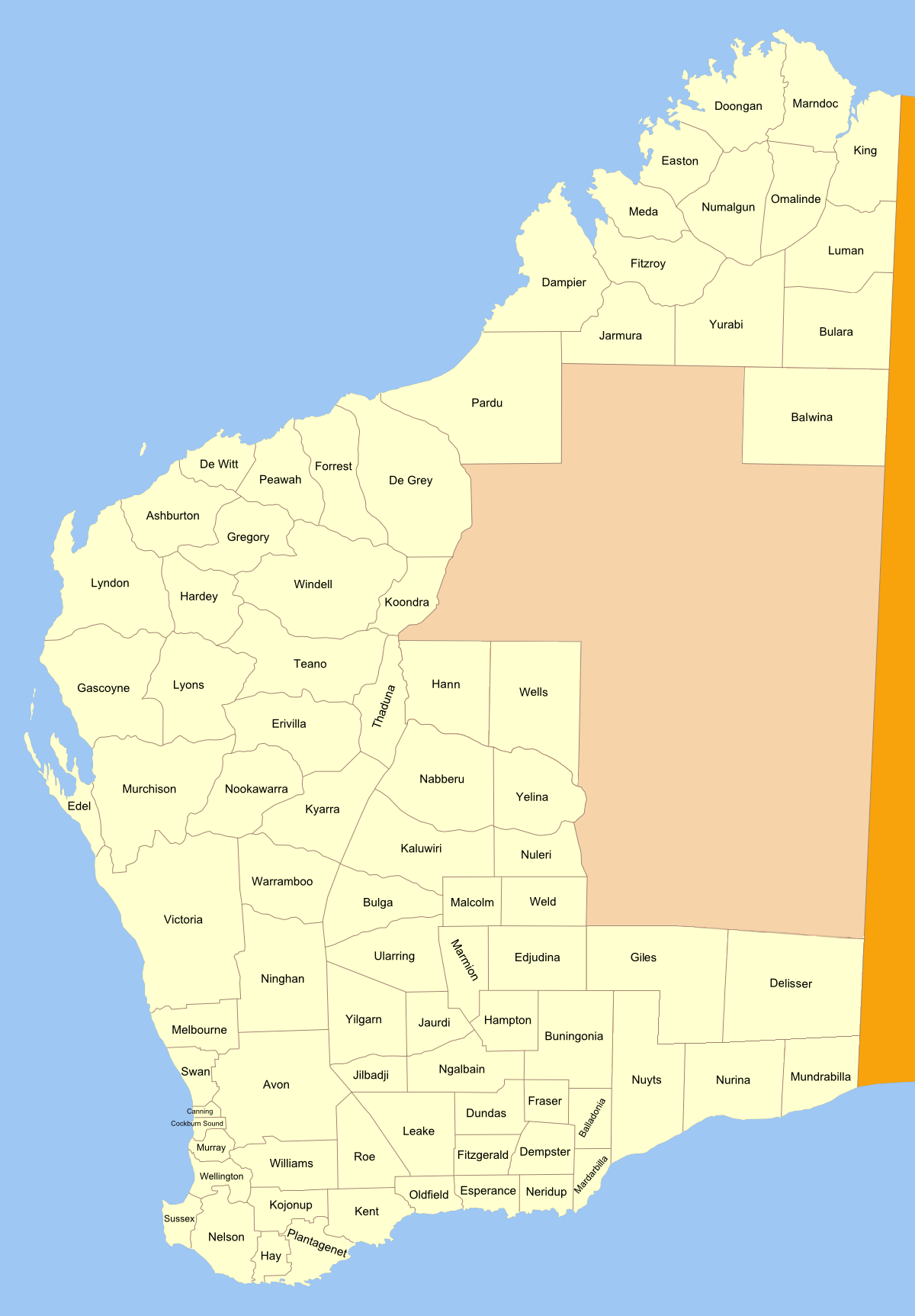
- Region: Pilbara
Lands administrative divisions around Koondra:
De Grey	De Grey
Windell	Koondra	Eastern Division
Teano	Thadoona	Hann

Koondra Land District is a land district (cadastral division) of Western Australia and a subdivision of the North-West Land Division, located in the Pilbara region of the state.

== Location ==
The district is located to the east Newman in the Shire of East Pilbara, and is bounded on the east by the rabbit-proof fence.

== History ==
It was first gazetted as the Kundra Land District on 13 June 1906. Its spelling was changed to Koondra on 19 May 1916 in an effort to more accurately capture its correct Aboriginal pronunciation.
