= Murray County, Western Australia =

Former designated cadastral division in Western Australia

Coordinates: 32°30′S 116°00′E

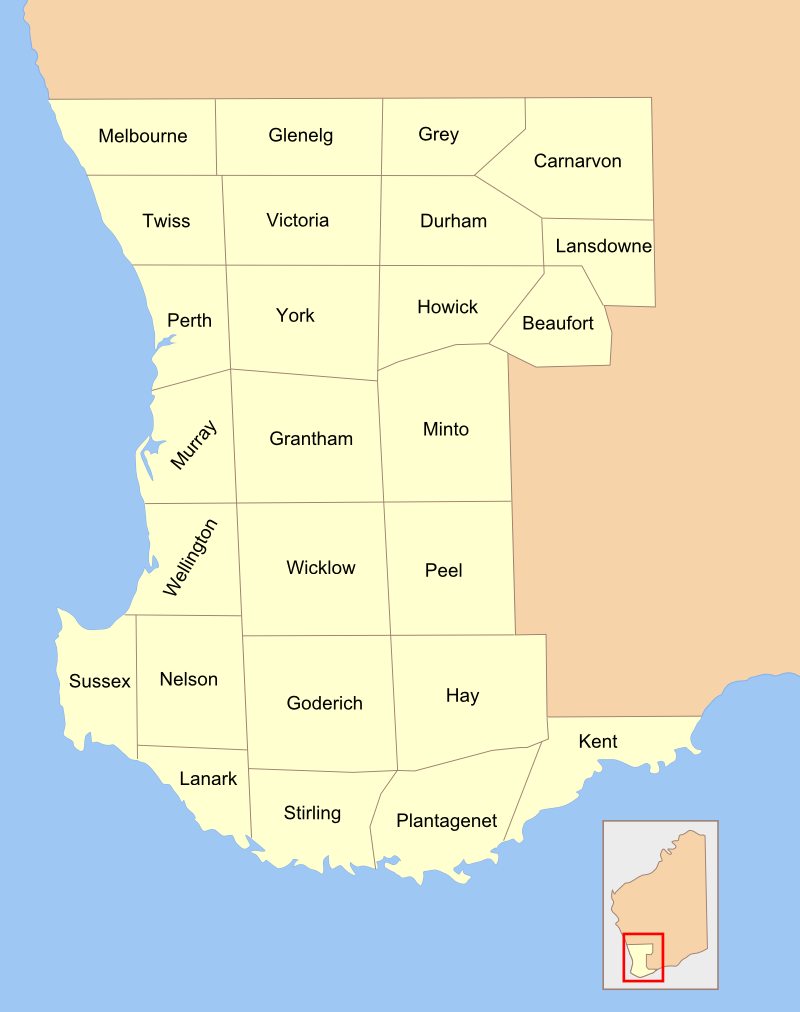
26 counties of Western Australia

Murray County was one of the 26 counties of Western Australia that were designated in 1829 as cadastral divisions. It was named after George Murray, Secretary of State for War and the Colonies from 1828 to 1830, a personal friend of Lieutenant-Governor James Stirling.

It approximately corresponds to the Murray Land District and part of the Cockburn Sound Land District which form the basis for land titles in the area.
