= Murray Land District =

Coordinates: 32°40′S 116°05′E

Murray Western Australia
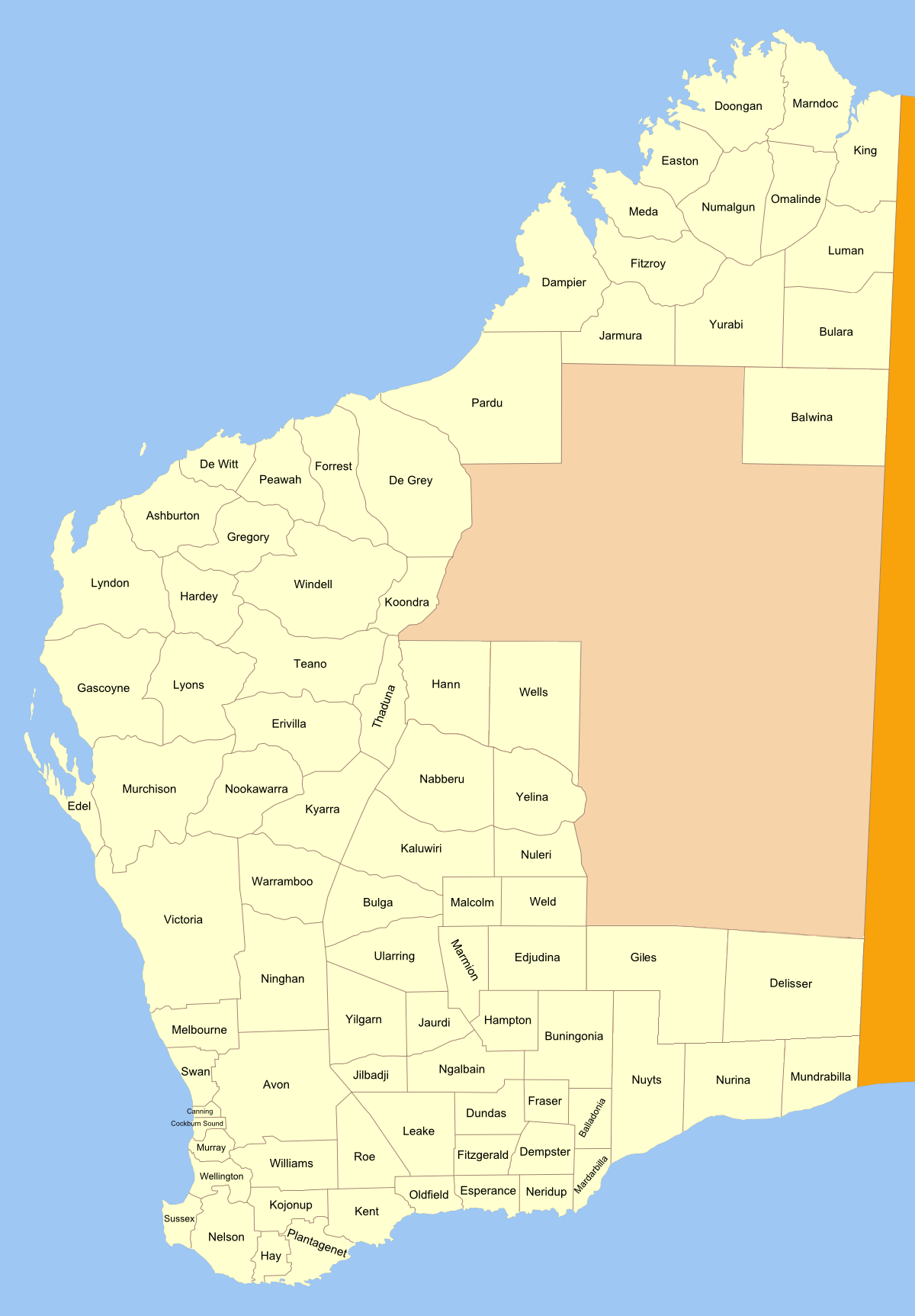
Lands administrative divisions around Murray:
Cockburn Sound	Cockburn Sound	Avon
Indian Ocean	Murray	Williams
Indian Ocean	Wellington	Wellington

Murray Land District is a land district (cadastral division) of Western Australia, located within the South-West Land Division on the state's west coast. It spans roughly 32°25'S - 32°56'S in latitude and 115°25'E - 116°30'E in longitude, and is located on the Indian Ocean coast, taking in the Shires of Murray and Waroona, the eastern part of the Serpentine-Jarrahdale and the western suburbs of Mandurah.

The system of land districts came together in an ad hoc fashion, and the Murray district started to be subdivided in 1837 well before any thought was given to formally defining its boundaries.

== Towns and areas ==
The Murray district contains the following current or former townsites, with the year of gazettal noted:

- Coolup (1899) and Coolup A.A. (1893)
- Dwellingup (1910)
- Furnissdale (1970)
- Hamel (1899) and Hamel A.A. (1906)
- Keysbrook (1916)
- Marrinup (1915; cancelled 1966)
- Nanga (1909; cancelled 1972)
- Pinjarra (1837)
- Wagerup (1899)
- Waroona (1895)
- Waterous (1907)
- Wuraming (1920)
- Yunderup (1898)
