= Lansdowne County =

Coordinates: 31°30′S 118°51′E

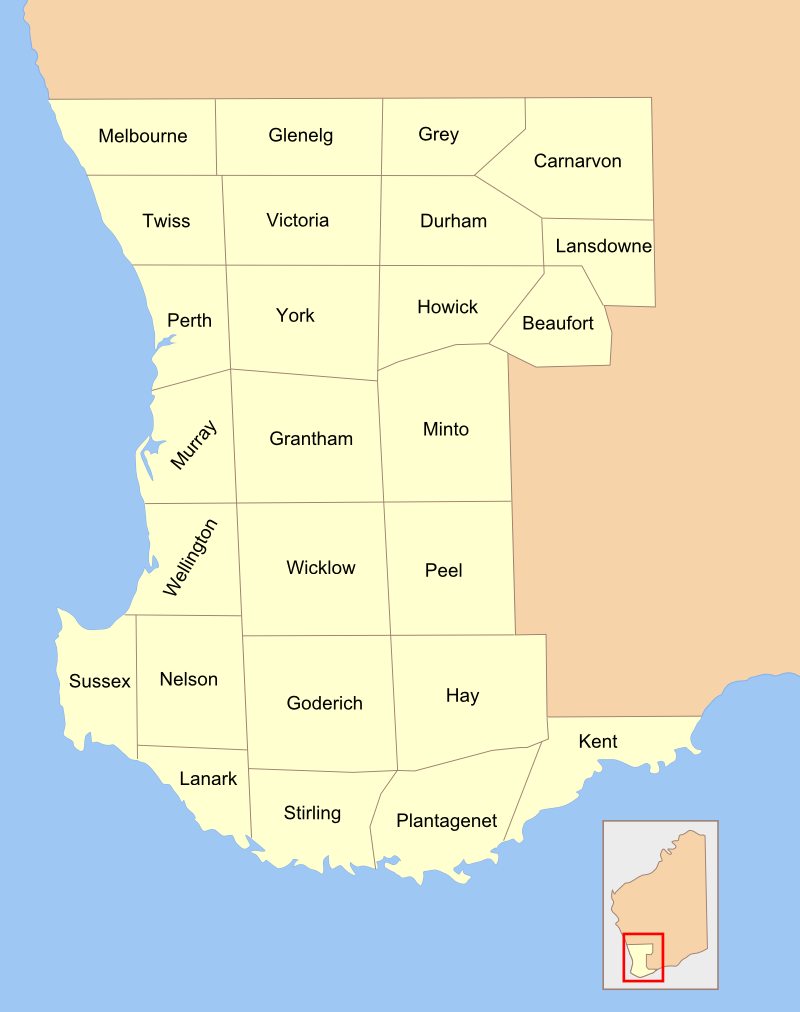
26 counties of Western Australia

Lansdowne County was one of the 26 counties of Western Australia that were designated in 1829 as cadastral divisions. It was named after Henry Petty-Fitzmaurice, 3rd Marquess of Lansdowne, Secretary of State for the Home Department from 1827 to 1828. It approximately corresponds to the Jilbadji Land District which was gazetted in 1903 and forms the basis for land titles in the area.
