= Windell Land District =

Coordinates: 22°55′S 118°35′E

Windell Western Australia
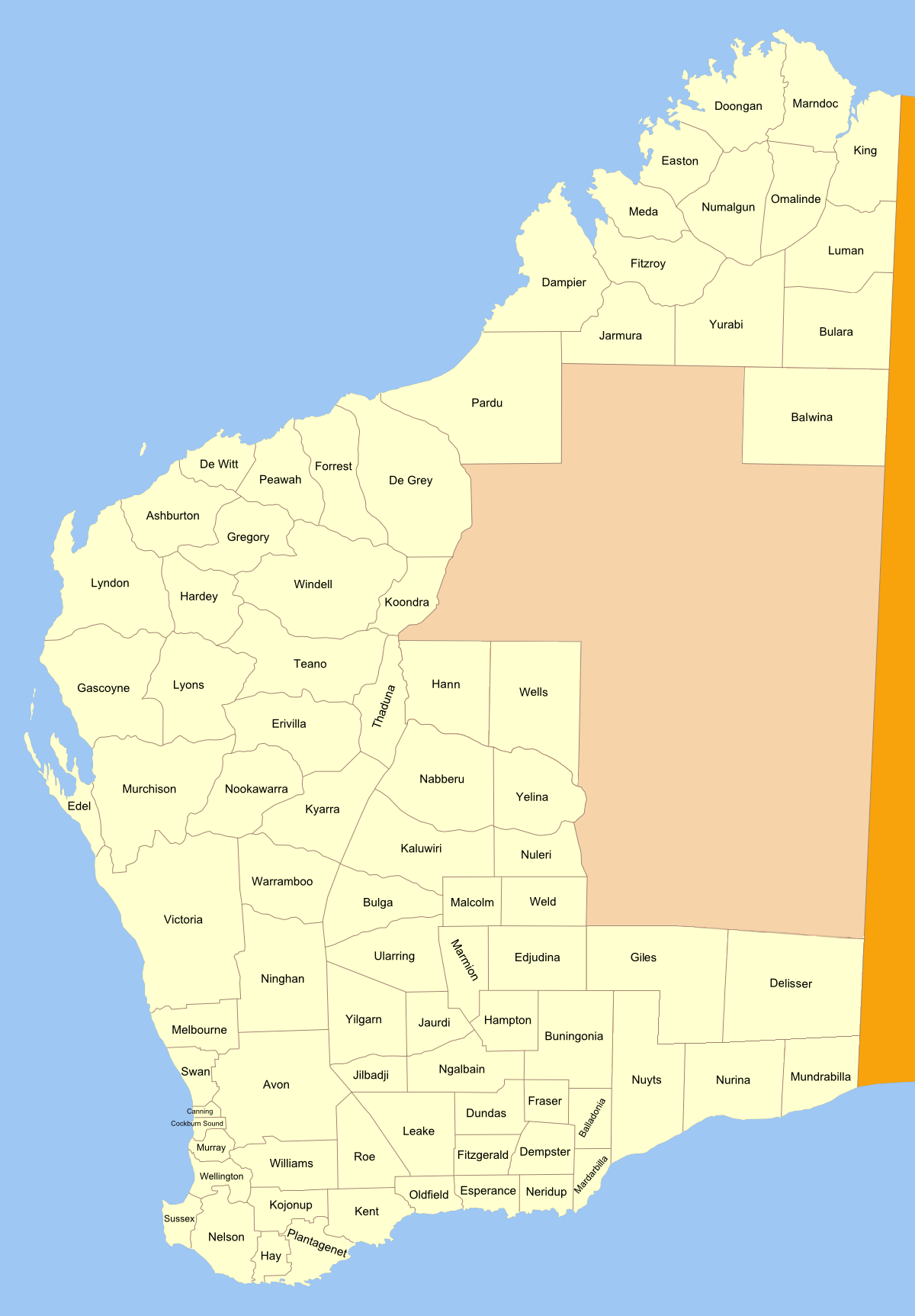
- Region: Pilbara
Lands administrative divisions around Windell:
Peawah	Forrest	De Grey
Gregory; Hardey	Windell	Koondra
Teano	Teano	Teano

Windell Land District is a land district (cadastral division) of Western Australia and a subdivision of the North-West Land Division. It contains Newman, Paraburdoo and the former town of Wittenoom.
