= Lands administrative divisions of Western Australia =

The lands administrative divisions of Western Australia refer to subdivisions of the state of Western Australia for cadastral (land title) purposes, most of which have been in place since the 19th century. The state is divided up for this purpose into five land divisions, which in turn are subdivided into land districts, which correspond to counties in other Australian states. These districts are then subdivided further into numbered locations, as well as gazetted townsites. Together, they form part of the lands administrative divisions of Australia.

== Land divisions ==
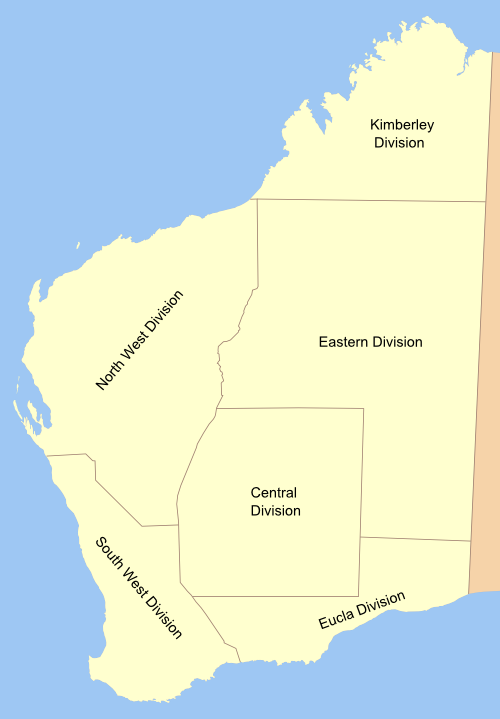
Map of the six land divisions of Western Australia before Central Division was incorporated into Eastern Division

There are five land divisions in Western Australia, as specified in Schedule 1 of the Land Administration Act 1997.

- Eastern Land Division
- Eucla Land Division
- Kimberley Land Division
- North West Land Division
- South West Land Division

The Rabbit-proof fence is the border between the North West and South West divisions on the western side, and the others on the eastern side. In practical terms, the divisions are rarely used — in 1897, the Under Secretary for Lands described their purpose as "really only for the purpose of classifying land for Pastoral Leases".

The system of divisions developed as follows:

Date enacted	Divisions	Enabling act	Maps
11 October 1882	Central, Central-Eastern, South-Eastern, North, Kimberley	Land Regulations	
2 March 1887	South-West, Kimberley, North-West, Gascoyne, Eucla, Eastern	Land Regulations, s.39	
1 January 1899	South-West, Kimberley, North-West, Western, Eucla, Eastern	Land Act 1898, s. 38	
1 February 1907	South-West, Kimberley, North-West, Central, Eucla, Eastern	Land Act Amendment Act 1906, s. 26	
28 March 1917	As above, but merged Central into Eastern	Land Act Amendment Act 1917 (No. 19), s. 4	
6 March 1934	As above	Land Act 1933 (No. 37), s. 28	
30 March 1998	As above	Land Administration Act 1997 (No. 30), s. 6 and Sch. 1	

== Land districts ==
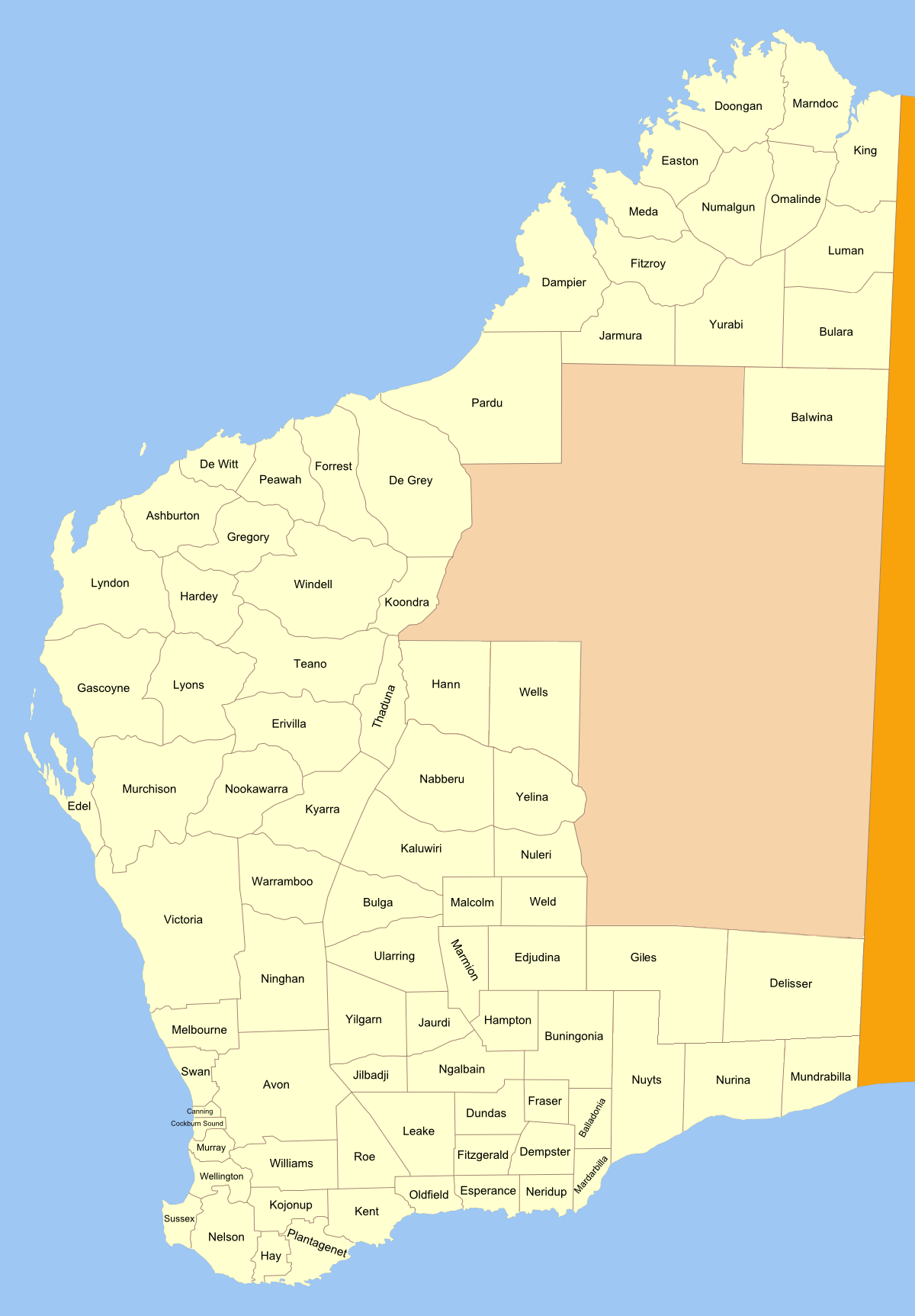
Map of the 80 land districts in 1909

An example of the further subdivisions of districts into locations and lots in the Perth suburb of Hamersley (part of the Swan Land District)

The land district is the highest level of land division actively used in Western Australian land titles, and has been in use in some form since the earliest days of the Swan River Colony, although only achieved statutory recognition with the enactment of section 7 the Land Act 1898. They are recognised today through section 26 of the Land Administration Act 1997. Under the system in place, there are two methods of distributing titles within a district: one is to gazette a townsite from land within the district and henceforth treat it entirely separately from the district; the other is to create locations (almost always numeric) within districts, such as Windell Location 7 or Swan Location 1315, and then either dedicate the location as a reserve with reference to the Governor's powers under the 1997 Act, grant the location in fee simple to an individual or company, or subdivide it into lots for sale or lease.

=== History ===
In 1831, instructions were issued from the Colonial Secretary in London for "the division of the whole of the territory of Western Australia into Counties, Hundreds and Parishes of fixed size". However, the system was all but abandoned within a few years, and district names were simply applied to areas without any effort to fix boundaries for them. Areas within declared townsites were managed separately.

At this time, the population of the colony was small, and the Governor had complete control over the affairs of the state, receiving advice from experts such as the Surveyor General, who was responsible for the Department of Lands and Surveys. In 1890, the colony achieved responsible government, and in 1892–1893, gold was discovered in the Kalgoorlie region, leading to a gold rush. In 1895–1896, the department, by now quite overwhelmed, attempted to define boundaries for districts based on where land had already been granted, but the result was irregular boundaries which did not follow natural features. Furthermore, in assigning and alienating the land, the department's officers were in somewhat uncharted territory due to the mix of pre-1890 regulations from the Governor with overly specific statutes from the legislature (such as the Homestead Act 1893 and Transfer of Land Act 1892) that they had to navigate. The Under Secretary for Lands noted in August 1896 that "there is no provision in any Act or Regulations for the declaration of land districts... it is only an office arrangement".

The Surveyor General and his staff agitated for a "Consolidated Land Bill" which would consolidate then repeal all previous arrangements, provide a statutory framework which recognised existing practice, and establish a more formal method for establishing and recording land districts. New broad-acre settlements in areas of the colony not already covered by districts (most notably at Carnarvon and Esperance) made the matter more urgent.

In the interim, the department started two new files at the beginning of 1897 which ultimately recorded the correspondence between the Chief Draftsman, Surveyor General, Under Secretary for Lands and the responsible Minister in setting up a consistent means of generating and naming new land districts which would form the basis of a statutory system once one emerged, and 25 new districts had been approved by year's end.

On 1 January 1899, the Land Act took effect, and the department's new system became the norm, with the only change being that all new districts or changes to existing ones were printed in the Government Gazette. Until 1902, with only some exceptions, names used were usually those of explorers or early settlers, but in 1902, the Surveyor General rejected a suggested list of new names, advising the Chief Draftsman that "I should much prefer euphonious native names if they can be obtained for these proposed new districts, as I think we should lose no opportunity of perpetuating the nomenclature of a fast disappearing race, apart from which the liability of duplicating names is largely increased if the surnames of individuals are devoted to land districts." Between 1902 and 1906, a considerable rush to gazette new districts was promoted by the desire to impress land agents in London — the Minister noted that "it will not hurt the State to show as few blanks as possible". Prior to the construction of the Trans-Australian Railway, the Eastern Division, which consists almost entirely of the Great Victoria and Great Sandy Deserts, did not contain any districts.

=== List of land districts ===
The list below represents a complete list of land districts, together with the division of which they are part and the year where they came into being — either through granting of locations prior to 1896, delineation in department files between 1896 and 1898, or gazettal from 1899 onwards.

District	Division	Location	Created	Notes
Ashburton	North-West	21°57′S 115°32′E	1897	
Avon	South-West	31°36′S 117°02′E	1833	
Balladonia	Eucla; Eastern	32°15′S 123°35′E	1897	
Balwina	Eastern	20°15′S 127°40′E	1928	
Bulara	Kimberley	19°10′S 128°10′E	1906	
Bulga	Eastern	28°25′S 119°40′E	1903	
Buningonia	Eastern	31°05′S 123°05′E	1903	
Canning	South-West	32°10′S 115°57′E	1833	
Cockburn Sound	South-West	32°20′S 115°50′E	1833	
Dampier	Kimberley	17°40′S 122°40′E	1897	
De Grey	North-West	21°20′S 120°05′E	1906	
De Witt	North-West	21°05′S 116°20′E	1897	
Delisser	Eucla; Eastern	30°00′S 127°45′E	1916	
Dempster	Eucla	32°40′S 122°55′E	1897	
Doongan	Kimberley	14°50′S 126°40′E	1906	Previously spelt Dungan
Dundas	Eucla	32°10′S 121°50′E	1897	
Easton	Kimberley	15°55′S 125°05′E	1906	Formerly known as Kwinana
Edel	North-West	26°40′S 113°40′E	1897	
Edjudina	Eastern	29°25′S 122°35′E	1903	
Erivilla	North-West	25°35′S 117°50′E	1897	
Esperance	Eucla	33°40′S 121°40′E	1896	
Fitzgerald	Eucla	32°55′S 121°37′E	1896	
Fitzroy	Kimberley	17°55′S 124°50′E	1897	
Forrest	North-West	21°25′S 118°55′E	1897	
Fraser	Eucla; Eastern	32°00′S 122°45′E	1897	
Gascoyne	North-West	24°50′S 114°25′E	1897	
Giles	Eucla; Eastern	30°00′S 125°20′E	1916	
Gregory	North-West	22°25′S 117°20′E	1897	
Hampton	Eastern	30°50′S 121°40′E	1899	
Hann	Eastern	24°50′S 120°50′E	1925	
Hardey	North-West	23°20′S 117°50′E	1897	
Hay	South-West	34°40′S 117°14′E	1857	
Jarmura	Kimberley	18°40′S 124°25′E	1906	
Jaurdi	Eastern	30°25′S 120°50′E	1903	
Jilbadji	Eastern	31°25′S 119°25′E	1903	
Kaluwiri	Eastern	27°50′S 120°40′E	1903	
Kent	South-West	33°50′S 118°50′E	1857	
King	Kimberley	15°50′S 128°40′E	1899	
Kojonup	South-West	33°40′S 117°35′E	1840	
Koondra	North-West	23°35′S 120°05′E	1906	Previously spelt Kundra
Kyarra	North-West	26°50′S 118°20′E	1897	
Leake	Eucla	32°25′S 120°25′E	1903	
Luman	Kimberley	17°20′S 128°10′E	1906	
Lyndon	North-West	23°10′S 114°40′E	1897	
Lyons	North-West	24°50′S 116°25′E	1897	
Malcolm	Eastern	28°50′S 121°20′E	1900	
Mardarbilla	Eucla	33°25′S 123°45′E	1897	
Marmion	Eastern	29°40′S 121°10′E	1899	
Marndoc	Kimberley	15°10′S 127°40′E	1906	
Meda	Kimberley	16°40′S 123°50′E	1897	
Melbourne	South-West	30°40′S 116°10′E	1848	
Milyuga	Eastern	25°25′S 127°25′E	1932	
Mundrabilla	Eucla	31°30′S 128°15′E	1903	
Murchison	North-West	26°40′S 115°40′E	1897	
Murray	South-West	32°40′S 116°05′E	1837	
Nabberu	Eastern	26°35′S 120°10′E	1903	
Nelson	South-West	34°10′S 116°10′E	1858	
Neridup	Eucla	33°40′S 122°55′E	1896	
Ngalbain	Eastern	31°20′S 121°10′E	1903	
Ninghan	North-West; South-West	30°10′S 117°35′E	1897	
Nookawarra	North-West	26°50′S 117°10′E	1897	
Nuleri	Eastern	27°40′S 122°10′E	1903	
Numalgun	Kimberley	16°40′S 125°50′E	1906	
Nurina	Eucla	31°40′S 126°30′E	1903	
Nuyts	Eucla	31°35′S 124°40′E	1903	
Oldfield	Eucla; South-West	33°40′S 120°25′E	1896	
Omalinde	Kimberley	16°20′S 127°10′E	1906	
Pardu	Kimberley; Eastern; North-West	19°50′S 120°40′E	1906	
Peawah	North-West	21°20′S 117°40′E	1897	
Plantagenet	South-West	34°20′S 117°50′E	1833	
Roe	South-West	32°50′S 119°10′E	1899	
Sussex	South-West	33°55′S 115°05′E	1840	
Swan	South-West	31°20′S 115°50′E	1833	
Teano	North-West	24°25′S 118°50′E	1906	
Thadoona	North-West	25°25′S 119°40′E	1903	Previously spelt Thaduna
Tugaila	Eastern	25°25′S 124°25′E	1932	
Ularring	Eastern	29°25′S 120°05′E	1903	
Victoria	North-West; South-West	29°10′S 115°25′E	1853	
Wanman	Eastern	22°10′S 123°50′E	1950s	
Warramboo	North-West	28°05′S 117°50′E	1897	
Weld	Eastern	28°40′S 122°25′E	1901	
Wellington	South-West	33°10′S 115°50′E	1835	
Wells	Eastern	25°15′S 122°30′E	1925	
Williams	South-West	32°50′S 117°50′E	1835	
Windell	North-West	22°55′S 119°35′E	1897	
Yamarna	Eastern	28°10′S 123°40′E	1930	
Yelina	Eastern	26°20′S 122°10′E	1903	
Yilgarn	Eastern	30°50′S 119°05′E	1900	
Yowalga	Eastern	27°55′S 127°00′E	1932	
Yurabi	Kimberley	18°55′S 125°32′E	1906	

== Counties ==
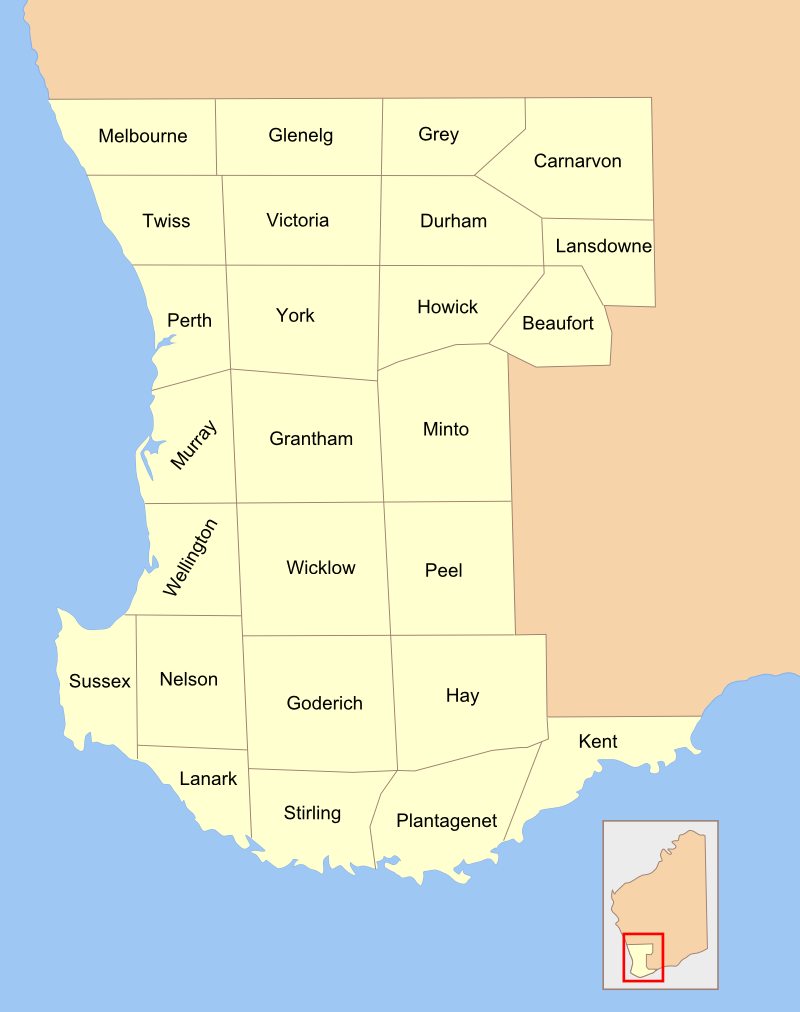
26 counties of Western Australia

Historically, there were 26 counties in the south-western part of the state, designated shortly after the Swan River Colony was founded in 1829. It was originally intended for these to be subdivided into hundreds and parishes in a manner similar to South Australia, but this did not occur, as the division/district system took precedence.

- Beaufort County
- Carnarvon County
- Durham County
- Glenelg County
- Goderich County
- Grantham County
- Grey County
- Hay County
- Howick County
- Kent County
- Lanark County
- Lansdowne County
- Melbourne County
- Minto County
- Murray County
- Nelson County
- Peel County
- Plantagenet County
- Perth County
- Stirling County
- Sussex County
- Twiss County
- Victoria County
- Wellington County
- Wicklow County
- York County
