= Wicklow County, Western Australia =

Coordinates: 33°22′S 116°43′E

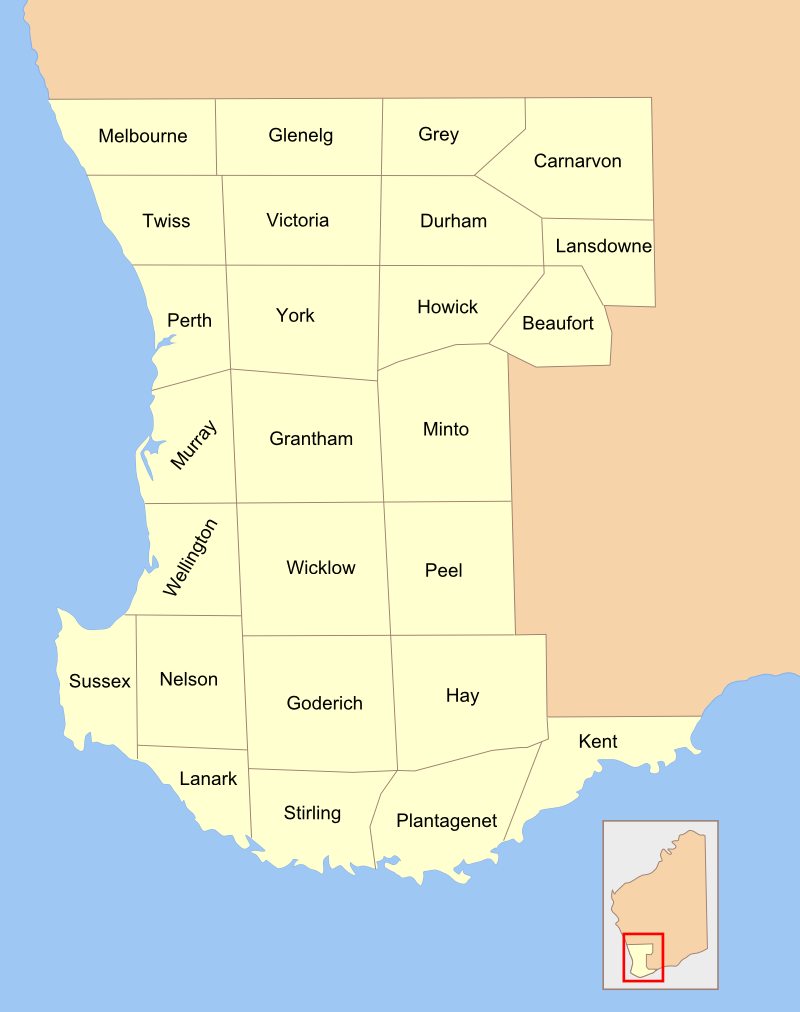
26 counties of Western Australia

Wicklow County was one of the 26 counties of Western Australia that were designated in 1829 as cadastral divisions. It was named after William Howard, 4th Earl of Wicklow, an Irish representative peer.

It approximately corresponds to the western part of the Williams Land District which forms the basis for land titles in the area.
