= Hay County =

County in Western Australia

Coordinates: 34°06′S 117°57′E

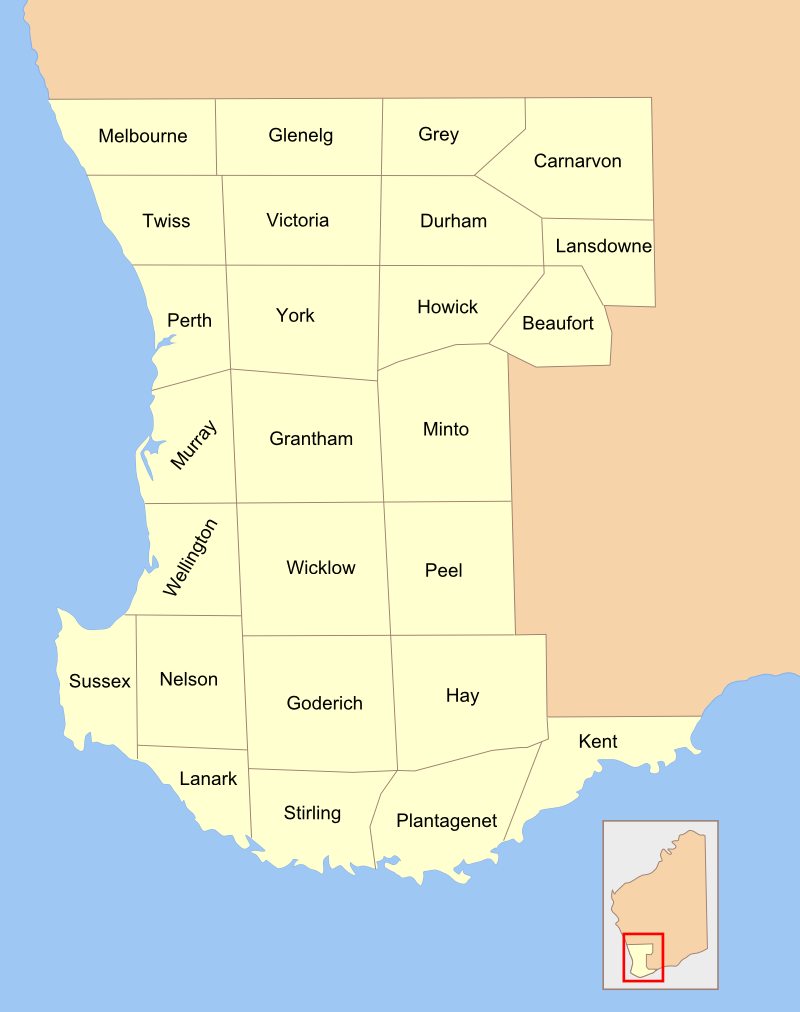
26 counties of Western Australia

Hay County was one of the 26 counties of Western Australia that were designated in 1829 as cadastral divisions. It was named after Robert William Hay, Under-Secretary of State for the Colonies from 1825 to 1836. It approximately corresponds to the southeastern Kojonup Land District and northern Plantagenet Land District which form the basis for land titles in the area.
