= Twiss County =

Coordinates: 31°18′S 115°51′E

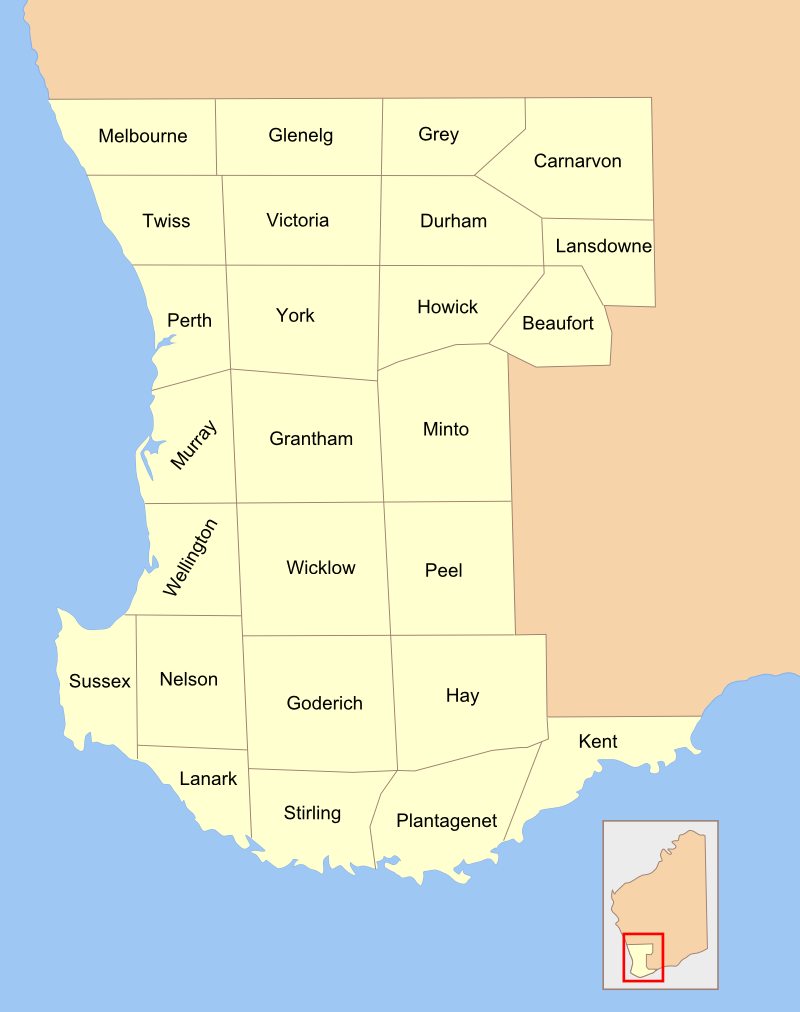
26 counties of Western Australia

Twiss County was one of the 26 counties of Western Australia that were designated in 1829 as cadastral divisions. It was named after Horace Twiss, Under-Secretary of State for War and the Colonies from 1828 to 1830, a personal friend of Lieutenant-Governor James Stirling.

It extended from Muchea and Yanchep in the south to Mogumber and Ledge Point in the north. The county approximately corresponds to the northern part of the Swan Land District and the north-western part of the Avon Land District, which form the basis for land titles in the area.
