= Minto County =

County in Western Australia

Coordinates: 32°30′S 117°47′E

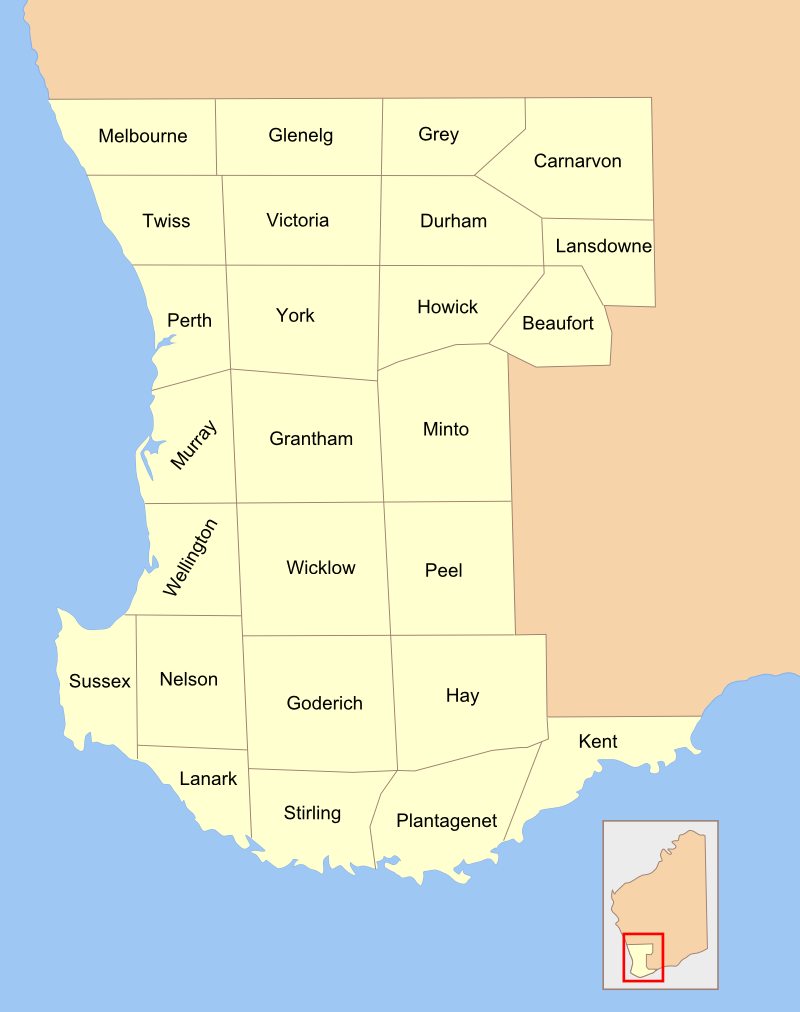
26 counties of Western Australia

Minto County was one of the 26 counties of Western Australia that were designated in 1829 as cadastral divisions. It approximately corresponds to parts of the Avon Land District and Williams Land District which form the basis for land titles in the area.
