= Wellington County, Western Australia =

Former county of Western Australia

Coordinates: 33°22′S 116°00′E

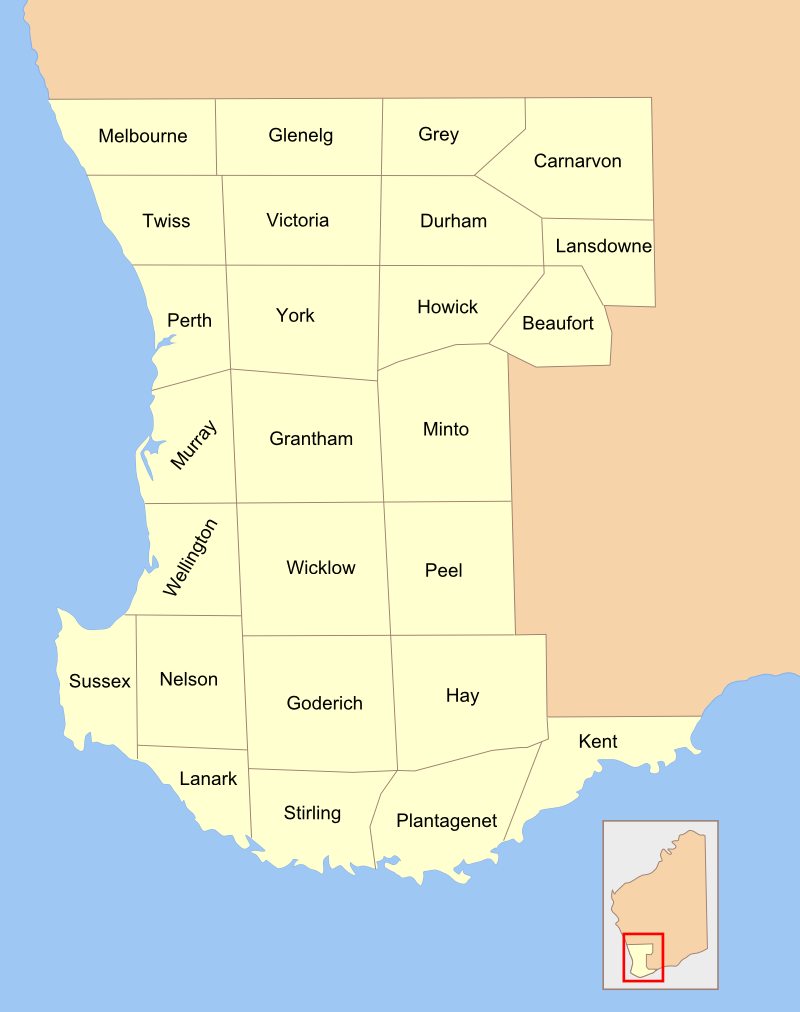
26 counties of Western Australia

Wellington County was one of the 26 counties of Western Australia that were designated in 1829 as cadastral divisions. It was named after Arthur Wellesley, 1st Duke of Wellington, Prime Minister of the United Kingdom from 1828-1830. It approximately corresponds to the Wellington Land District which forms the basis for land titles in the area.
