= Plantagenet County, Western Australia =

Coordinates: 34°49′S 117°47′E

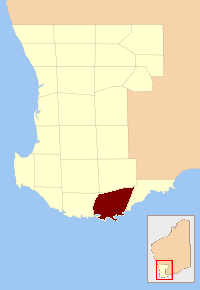
Location of Plantagenet county within the 26 counties of Western Australia

Plantagenet County was one of the 26 counties of Western Australia that were designated in 1829 as cadastral divisions, and was centred on the coastal settlement of Albany. It approximately corresponds to the modern-day Plantagenet Land District which forms the basis for land titles in the area.

== Sources ==
- Taylor, Thomas George (1860). Western Australia; its history, progress, position, & prospects, Volume 13. London: G.Street.
