= Yenyening Lakes =

Group of lakes in Western Australia

Yenyenning Lake
- Location in Western Australia
- Interactive map of Yenyenning Lake
- Location: Wheatbelt, Western Australia
- Coordinates: 32°14′02″S 117°11′54″E
- Type: saline
- Catchment area: 13,000 ha (32,000 acres)
- Basin countries: Australia
- Surface area: 150 ha (370 acres)

Yenyenning Lake, also often spelt Yenyening Lakes, and associated lakes are in the upper Avon River catchment area in Western Australia, and the source of the Avon and Swan River systems.

It is located in the Wheatbelt region of Western Australia approximately 31 km (19 mi) north east of Brookton. The names of the lakes and features from the western end of the chain are:

- Causeway Lake
- Johnnie's Lake
- Ski Lake
- Racecourse Lake
- Ossigs Lake
- (feature known as The Neck)
- (unnamed water here)
- Mud Lake
- Rocky Lake
- (unnamed water here)
- Swan Lake
- (feature known as the Channel)

The lakes are part of what are called playa lake chains, and the system is often referred to as an example.

The 13,000-hectare (32,000-acre) catchment area is composed of alluvial and aeolian deposits; it receives an average annual rainfall of 452 mm (17.8 in) and has an annual evaporation rate of 2,004 mm (78.9 in). The lakes are found along major ancient drainage lines with a broad drainage floor over a paleochannel and at the meeting point of the zone of ancient drainage and the zone of rejuvenated drainage. The larger lakes in the system are separated by sandy rises, saline drainage floors and diffuse drainage lines.

Situated in the Wheatbelt region, the lakes have had adjoining land heavily used for agriculture since European settlement in the region. The lakes occur in three adjoining local government areas, Beverley, Brookton and Quairading. The lakes, which are a wildlife haven, were often referred to as the County Peak lakes and can be seen from the summit of nearby County Peak.

The resultant problems, including salinity issues, have been researched and investigated extensively. The location west of the lakes, where a dam was created in the early 1900s, is known as the Qualandry Crossing, and has had extensive commentary as to its effectiveness in relation to salinity issues.

Remnant vegetation that surrounds the lakes has been made into a nature reserve.

In the early twentieth century some of the lakes had been identified as either fresh or salty and in the 1970s the lakes were known for duck shooting.

== See also ==
- List of lakes of Australia § Western Australia
