= Melbourne County =

Former county in Western Australia

Coordinates: 30°49′S 115°42′E

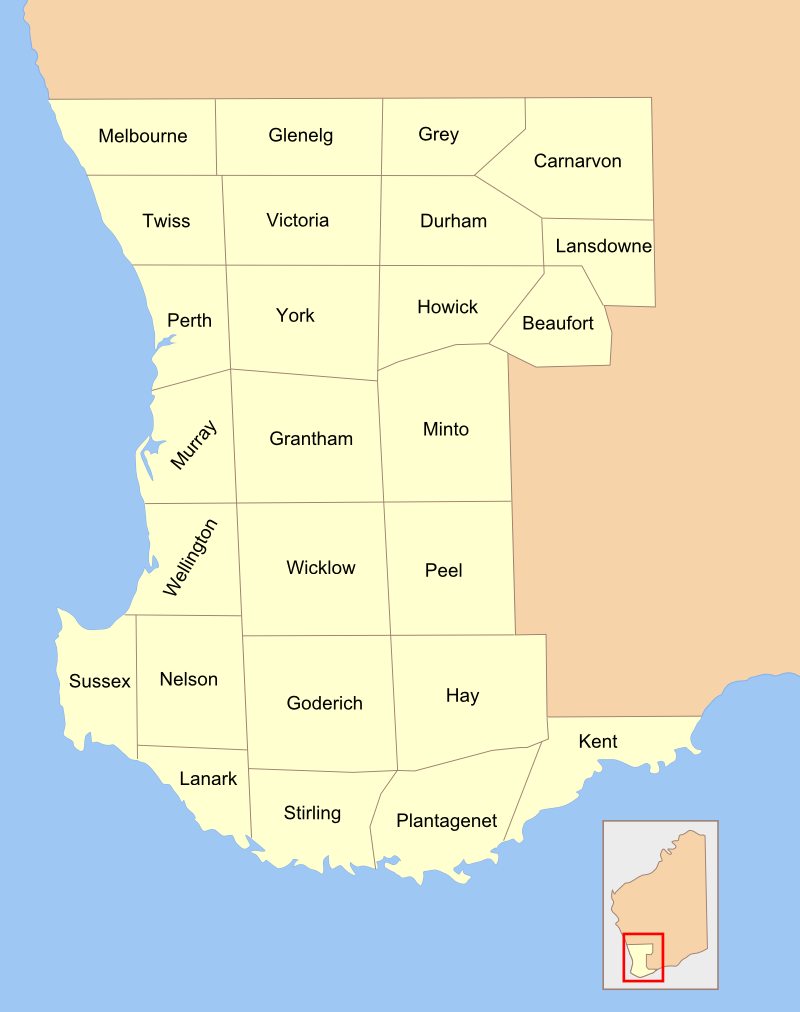
26 counties of Western Australia

Melbourne County was one of the 26 counties of Western Australia that were designated in 1829 as cadastral divisions of the Swan River Colony. It was named after William Lamb, 2nd Viscount Melbourne, Chief Secretary for Ireland by Lieutenant-Governor James Stirling.

It was one of the few counties to survive intact (as the Melbourne Land District) in the land district system which became the basis for land titles in the area.
