= Goderich County =

Coordinates: 34°09′S 116°43′E

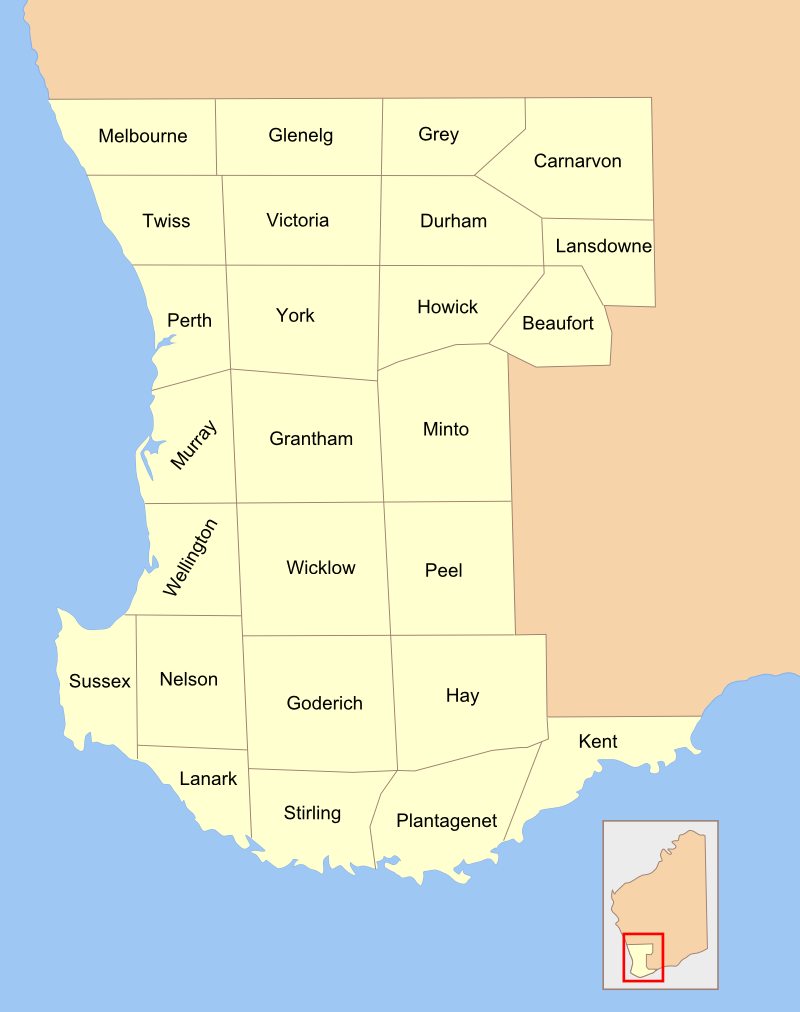
26 counties of Western Australia

Goderich County was one of the 26 counties of Western Australia that were designated in 1829 as cadastral divisions. It was named after F. J. Robinson, 1st Viscount Goderich, Prime Minister of the United Kingdom from August 1827 to January 1828.

It approximately corresponds to the northern part of the Hay Land District and the southwestern part of the Kojonup Land District which form the basis for land titles in the area.
