= Sussex Land District =

Sussex
- Cadastral division
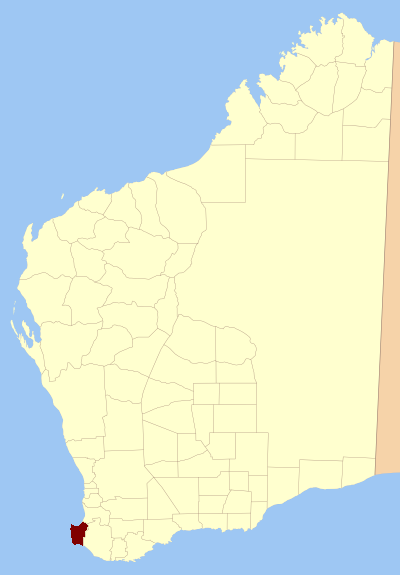
- Location in Western Australia
- Country: Australia
- State: Western Australia
Lands administrative divisions around Sussex
Indian Ocean	Indian Ocean	Wellington
Indian Ocean	Sussex	Nelson
Indian Ocean	Flinders Bay	Nelson

Sussex Land District is a land district (cadastral division) of Western Australia, located within the South-West Land Division on the state's west coast. It covers the south-western corner of the state and includes the townsites of Busselton, Margaret River and Augusta as well as Cape Naturaliste and Cape Leeuwin.

== History ==
The system of land districts came together in an ad-hoc fashion, and the Sussex district started to be subdivided in 1840 well before any thought was given to formally defining its boundaries. The definition later used by the Lands and Surveys department came from an 1862 gazettal which read as follows:

Bounded on the North by an East line from the sea-coast to Capel River through the North end of Wonnerup Inlet, then by said river upwards to location 171 (exclusive), then by a South-easterly line to junction of Padbury Brook with the River Blackwood; on the West and South by the sea-coast; and on the East by the Blackwood downwards to its junction with a South line through Black Point, thence by that line to the sea-coast.

== Towns and areas ==
=== Towns ===
The Sussex district contains the following current or former townsites:

Townsite	Coordinates	Gazetted	Notes
Augusta	34.312°S 115.159°E	1830	
Broadwater	33.662°S 115.276°E	1897	
Busselton	33.648°S 115.346°E	1835	
Carbunup River	33.699°S 115.189°E	1926	
Cowaramup	33.852°S 115.095°E	1925	
Dunsborough	33.614°S 115.105°E	1879	
Forest Grove	34.072°S 115.098°E	1925	Cancelled in 1970
Gracetown	33.868°S 114.987°E	1963	
Jarrahwood	33.797°S 115.666°E	1932	
Margaret River	33.955°S 115.075°E	1913	
Mowen	33.938°S 115.196°E	1925	
Prevelly	33.981°S 114.992°E	1978	
Quigup	33.958°S 115.702°E	1911	
Quindalup	33.629°S 115.129°E	1899	
Ruabon	33.654°S 115.491°E	1925	"Abba River" until 1928
Vasse	33.684°S 115.264°E	1907	
Witchcliffe	34.024°S 115.099°E	1926	
Wonnerup	33.624°S 115.416°E	1856	
Yallingup	33.640°S 115.029°E	1911*	Not formally gazetted

=== Agricultural areas ===
Under the Land Act 1898, the Agricultural Lands Purchase Act 1896, and preceding regulations, it was open to the Governor to declare agricultural areas on crown land or repurchased estates on private land, to which special provisions applied for both alienation and improvement. Many of these estates came into being shortly after World War I for the purposes of soldier resettlement.

Name	Coordinates	Gazetted	Notes
Anniebrook Estate	33.654°S 115.177°E	1930	West of Busselton
Locke's Estate	33.664°S 115.236°E	1921	West of Busselton
Marybrook Estate	33.659°S 115.201°E	1907	West of Busselton
Stirling Estate	33.564°S 115.482°E	1904	Near Ruabon
