= George Murray (British Army officer) =

British Army officer, politician and colonial administrator (1772–1846)

General The Right Honourable Sir George Murray GCB GCH FRS
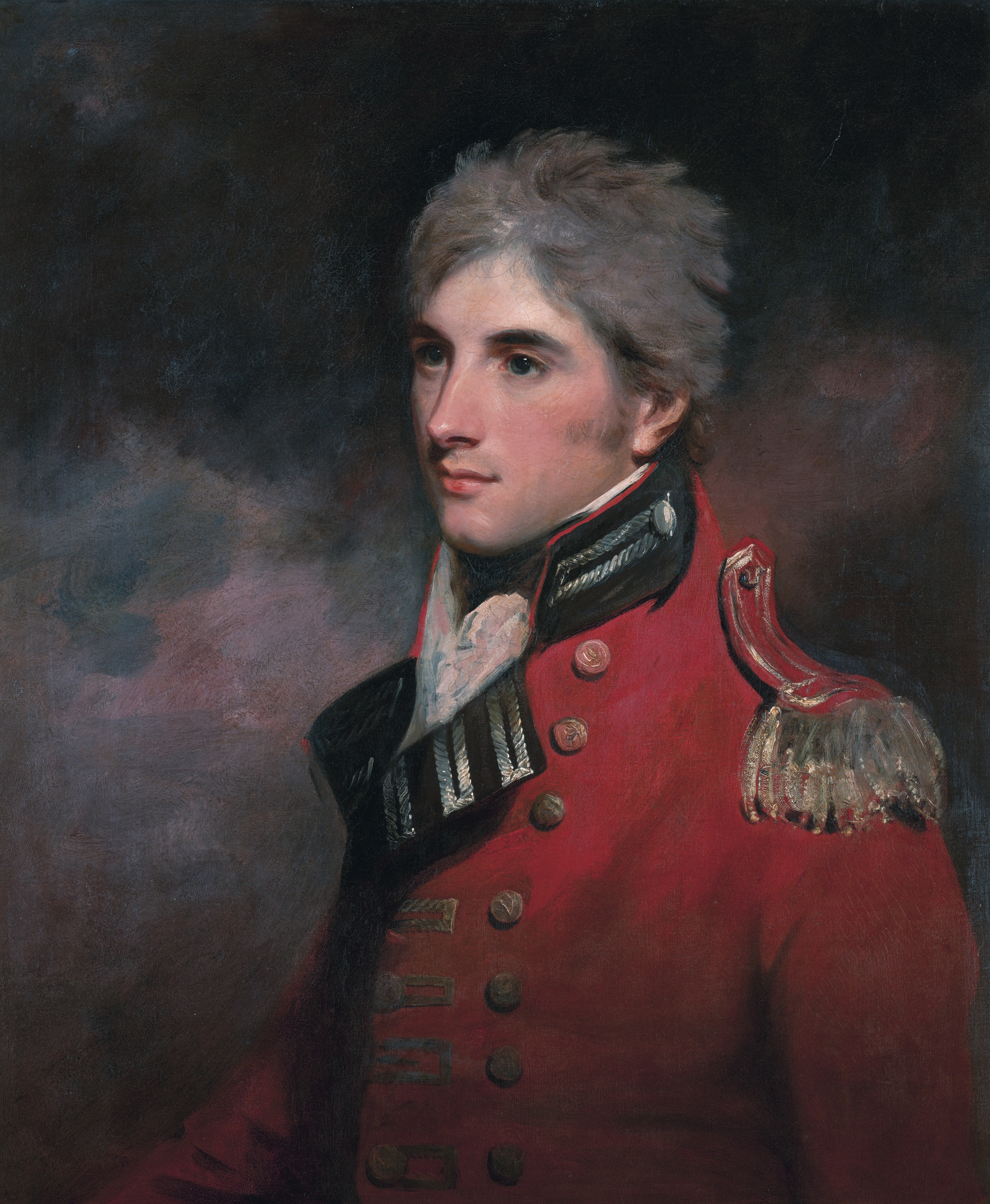
- Portrait by John Hoppner

Secretary of State for War and the Colonies
- In office 30 May 1828 – 22 November 1830
- Monarchs: George IV; William IV
- Prime Minister: The Duke of Wellington
- Preceded by: William Huskisson
- Succeeded by: The Viscount Goderich

Personal details
- Born: 6 February 1772 Ochtertyre, Perthshire
- Died: 28 July 1846 (aged 74) Belgrave Square, London
- Party: Tory
- Spouse: Louisa Erskine (m. 1825; died 1842)
- Children: Louise Georgiana (illegitimate)

General Sir George Murray GCB GCH FRS (6 February 1772 – 28 July 1846) was a British Army officer, Tory politician and colonial administrator.

== Background and education ==
Murray was born in Ochtertyre, near Crieff in Perthshire, the second son of Sir William Murray, of Ochtertyre, 5th Baronet (see Murray Baronets), and was educated at the Royal High School, Edinburgh and the University of Edinburgh. His mother was Lady Augusta Mackenzie, youngest daughter of the Jacobite George, 3rd Earl of Cromartie. His elder brother was Sir Patrick Murray, 6th Baronet.

An army surgeon, who knew Murray in Dublin in 1825 described his appearance as 'never saw a finer face than his. Indeed, such a pleasing and happy combination of intelligence, sweetness and spirit, with regularity, beauty and a noble cast of features, is rarely to be found in human physiognomies.'

== Military career ==
In 1789, Murray obtained a commission into the 71st Foot reaching the rank of captain in 1794, and saw service in Flanders (1794–95), the West Indies, England and Ireland. In 1799, he was made a lieutenant-colonel, entering the Quartermaster General's Department and making his considerable reputation as Quartermaster General (1808–11) during the Peninsular War, under the Duke of Wellington, and receiving promotion to Colonel in 1809. After a brief period as Quartermaster General in Ireland, Murray returned to the Peninsular Campaign as Major-General (1813–14), and was invested with the Order of the Bath in 1813. During the Peninsular War he was present at the battles of A Coruña, Talavera, Busaco, Fuentes de Oñoro, Vittoria, Nivelle, Nive, Orthez and Toulouse. His Peninsular Gold Medal had six clasps – only the Duke of Wellington, with nine clasps, Sir Dennis Pack and Lord Beresford, with seven each, had more clasps to their medal.

He was briefly in Canada from December 1814 to May 1815 where he was appointed provisional Lieutenant-Governor of Upper Canada and reviewed the country's defences. He quickly returned to Europe following Napoleon's escape from Elba, but arrived too late to take part in the Battle of Waterloo.

After the cessation of hostilities, Murray was based in France as Chief of Staff to the Army of Occupation and, thereafter, he was appointed Governor of the Royal Military College, Sandhurst in 1819. He was awarded an honorary degree by the University of Oxford in 1820 and was elected a Fellow of the Royal Society in 1824. In 1825, he married Lady Louisa Erskine, widow of Sir James Erskine of Torrie (1772–1825). Subsequently, he was made Lieutenant-General of the Ordnance and then Commander-in-Chief, Ireland, but in 1828 he resigned the position and became Colonial Secretary. He was later Master-General of the Ordnance from 1834 to 1835 and again between 1841 and 1846.

== Political career ==
Murray was a Tory and later Conservative in politics. He was Member of Parliament for Perthshire from 1824 to 1832 and from 1834 until he retired in 1835. He served as Secretary of State for War and the Colonies from 1828 to 1830. He also contested Westminster in 1837 and Manchester in both 1839 and 1841, without success.

== Other public appointments ==
Murray was also President of the Royal Geographical Society (1833–35) and Governor of Edinburgh Castle. On 7 September 1829 he was appointed Governor of Fort George.

== Personal life ==
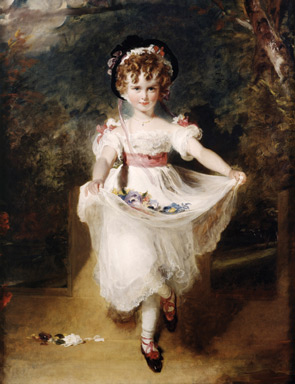
Miss Murray (Louise Georgina), c.1824–26, by Sir Thomas Lawrence

Murray was married to Lady Louisa Erskine (née Paget) (1777–1842) in 1825, widow of Lieutenant General Sir James Erskine (1772–1825), and sister of his fellow general, Henry, Lord Anglesey after much scandals; which resulted in the couple having one illegitimate daughter born in 1822 when Lady Louisa was still married to Sir James, the daughter was named Louise Georgina (1822-1891).

Murray later brought his daughter to be presented in 1830 and it was reported that the new Queen Adelaide, was ‘very rude to Murray and his daughter, who said afterwards that it was very painful but necessary’. Louise married Lieutenant Henry Boyce of the 2nd Life Guards on 14 Sep 1843, but he died in 1848 and she lived childless, until she died at Bordighera on 25 Feb 1891.

Murray died in July 1846, aged 74, at his house in 5 Belgrave Square and was buried in Kensal Green Cemetery, London. His substantial papers and maps were given to the National Library of Scotland by a great-niece in 1913.

== Legacy ==
The Memorials to Governors in the Chapel of the present-day Royal Military Academy Sandhurst include: In Memory of General the Right Hon. Sir George Murray, G.C.B., G.C H., Colonel 1st Royal Regiment of Foot. Died 28 July 1846, aged 74. He served in Holland, Egypt, Syria, the West Indies, Denmark, and Sweden; wsLS Q.M.G. in the Peninsula; Commander-in-Chief in Canada; Chief of the Staff of the Army of Occupation in France; Commander of the Forces in Ireland, and twice Master-General of the Ordnance. He was Governor of this College from 1819 to 1824.

The Murray River and Mount Murray in eastern Australia, the Murray River and Murray County in Western Australia, were named after him. Places in Hong Kong named after him include: Murray House, one of the oldest surviving public buildings in Hong Kong, Murray Building, Murray Road and the former Murray Barracks. The city of Perth, Western Australia was named in his honour after his parliamentary constituency Perthshire.

Parliament of the United Kingdom
Preceded by James Drummond	Member of Parliament for Perthshire; 1824–1832	Succeeded by The Earl of Ormelie
Preceded by The Earl of Ormelie	Member of Parliament for Perthshire; 1834–1835	Succeeded by Fox Maule
Military offices
New regiment	Colonel of the 7th Battalion, 60th Regiment of Foot; 1817–1823	Battalion disbanded
Preceded by The Lord Hill	Colonel of the 72nd Regiment of Foot; 1817–1823	Succeeded by Sir John Hope
Preceded by Sir Alexander Hope	Governor of the Royal Military College, Sandhurst; 1819–1824	Succeeded by Sir Alexander Hope
Preceded by The Earl of Hopetoun	Colonel of the 42nd (Royal Highland) Regiment of Foot; 1823–1843	Succeeded by Sir John Macdonald
Preceded by The Viscount Beresford	Lieutenant-General of the Ordnance; 1824–1825	Succeeded by Sir William Henry Clinton
Preceded by The Viscount Combermere	Commander-in-Chief, Ireland; 1825–1828	Succeeded by Sir John Byng
Preceded by Sir David Baird	Governor of Inverness; 1829–1833	Office abolished
Preceded by The Lord Lynedoch	Colonel of the 1st, or The Royal Regiment of Foot; 1843–1846	Succeeded by Sir James Kempt
Political offices
Preceded by William Huskisson	Secretary of State for War and the Colonies; 1828–1830	Succeeded by The Viscount Goderich
Preceded by Sir James Kempt	Master-General of the Ordnance; 1834–1835	Succeeded by Sir Richard Hussey Vivian, Bt
Preceded by Sir Hussey Vivian, Bt	Master-General of the Ordnance; 1841–1846	Succeeded by The Marquess of Anglesey
