= Beaufort County, Western Australia =

1829 cadastral division of Western Australia

Coordinates: 31°46′S 118°30′E

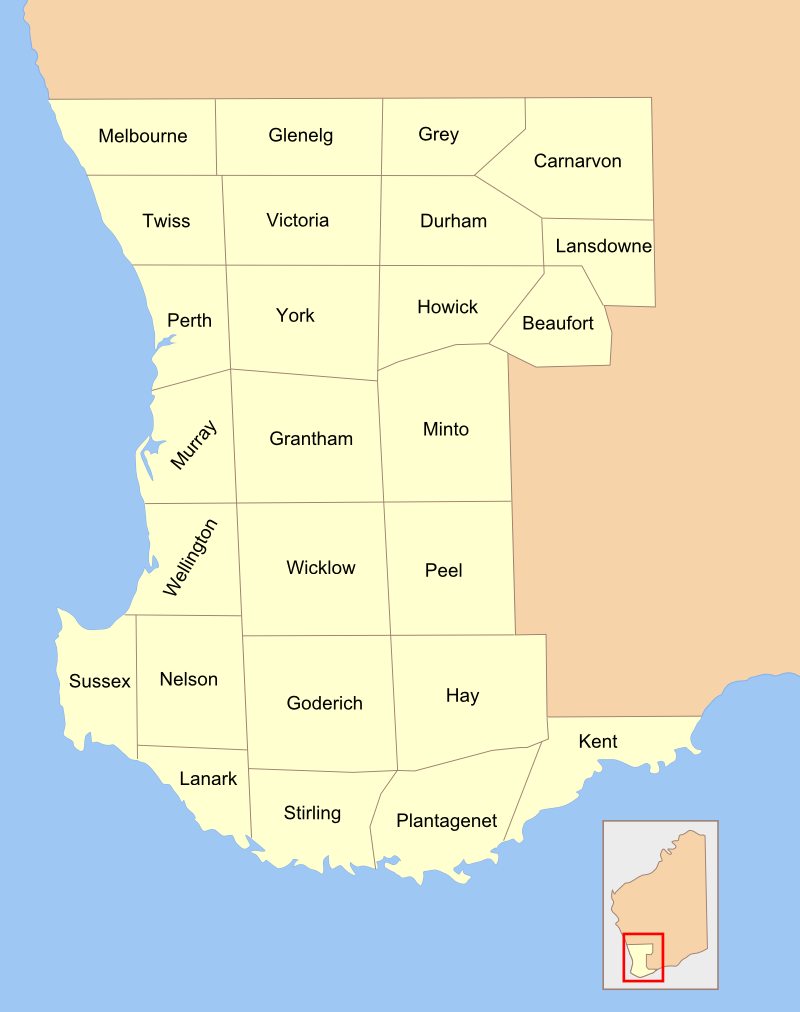
26 counties of Western Australia

Beaufort County was one of the 26 counties of Western Australia that were designated in 1829 as cadastral divisions. It approximately corresponds to the far eastern end of the Avon Land District which forms the basis for land titles in the area.
