= Howick County =

Western Australian county

Coordinates: 31°44′S 117°47′E

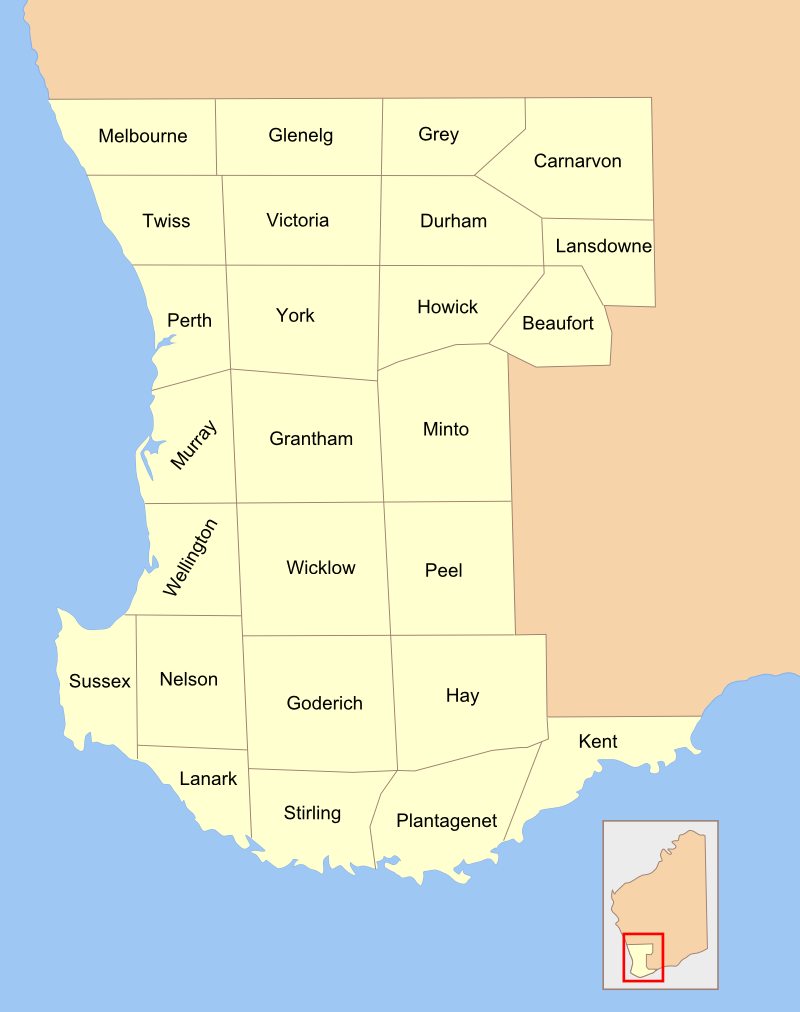
26 counties of Western Australia

Howick County was one of the 26 counties of Western Australia that were designated in 1829 as cadastral divisions. It was named after Viscount Howick, a well-connected Whig MP who was to become Under-Secretary of State for War and the Colonies in 1830. It approximately corresponds to the southeastern part of the Avon Land District which forms the basis for land titles in the area.
