= Nelson Land District =

Nelson Western Australia
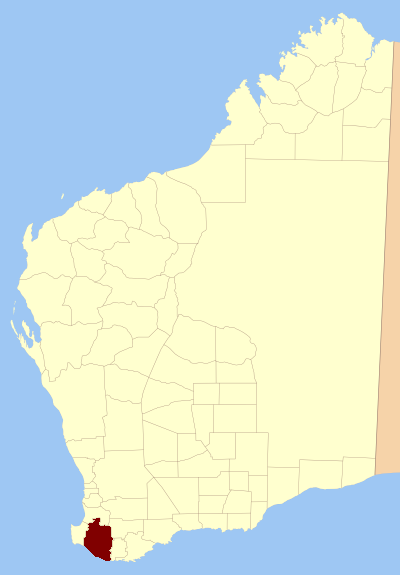
- Location in Western Australia
Lands administrative divisions around Nelson:
Wellington	Wellington	Kojonup
Sussex	Nelson	Kojonup; Hay
Indian Ocean	Southern Ocean	Hay

Nelson Land District is a land district (cadastral division) of Western Australia, located within the South West Division on the state's south coast. It covers part of the state's Lower South West region and includes the townsites of Bridgetown, Manjimup, Pemberton, Northcliffe and Nannup as well as Point D'Entrecasteaux and, at its far southeastern corner, Walpole (the Frankland River is its boundary at this point).

== History ==
The system of land districts came together in an ad hoc fashion, and the Nelson district started to be subdivided in 1858 well before any thought was given to formally defining its boundaries.

== Towns and areas ==
=== Towns ===
The Nelson district contains the following current or former townsites:

Townsite	Coordinates	Gazetted	Notes
Asplin	33.807°S 116.493°E	1912	
Balbarrup	34.229°S 116.201°E	1903	"Manjimup" until 1910
Balingup	33.786°S 115.984°E	1898	
Boyup Brook	33.833°S 116.388°E	1900	"Boyup" until 1909
Bridgetown	33.958°S 116.141°E	1868	
Camfield	34.916°S 116.465°E	1957	On Broke Inlet
Dinninup	33.815°S 116.548°E	1915	
Eastbrook	34.397°S 116.106°E	1932	
Greenbushes	33.847°S 116.058°E	1899	
Hester	33.909°S 116.161°E	1899	
Jardee	34.285°S 116.121°E	1927	
Kirup	33.707°S 115.892°E	1901	
Kulikup	33.826°S 116.677°E	1912	
Manjimup	34.235°S 116.141°E	1910	
Mayanup	33.933°S 116.454°E	1907	
Mullalyup	33.745°S 115.948°E	1901	
Nannup	33.982°S 115.765°E	1890	
North Greenbushes	33.827°S 116.051°E	1899	
Northcliffe	34.632°S 116.124°E	1924	
Palgarup	34.164°S 116.184°E	1909	
Pemberton	34.446°S 116.036°E	1925	
Strachan	34.403°S 116.461°E	1957	
Tonebridge	34.234°S 116.708°E	1961	
Walpole	34.978°S 116.733°E	1933	
Wheatley	34.103°S 115.977°E	1956	
Wilga	33.694°S 116.230°E	1915	
Yanmah	34.190°S 116.018°E	1923	

=== Agricultural areas ===
Under the Land Act 1898, the Agricultural Lands Purchase Act 1896, and preceding regulations, it was open to the Governor to declare agricultural areas on crown land or repurchased estates on private land, to which special provisions applied for both alienation and improvement. Many of these estates came into being shortly after World War I for the purposes of soldier resettlement.

Name	Coordinates	Gazetted	Notes
Brooklands Estate	33.796°S 115.947°E	1919	West of Balingup
Cammilleri Estate	33.816°S 115.784°E	1920	
Cascades Estate	33.882°S 116.118°E	1919	
Cundinup Estate	33.824°S 115.802°E	1922	
Glenlea Estate	34.001°S 116.211°E	1919	near Glenlynn
Glenmore Estate	33.815°S 115.968°E	1919	near Balingup
Norlup Park Estate		1920	near Greenbushes
Perup AA	34.261°S 116.361°E	1898	cancelled in 1904
Ravenscliffe Estate		1919	near Kirup
Tanjanerup AA	33.982°S 115.785°E	1897	
Tweed AA	33.978°S 116.406°E	1892	
Wilgarrup AA	34.146°S 116.246°E	1898	
