= Carnarvon County =

Coordinates: 31°00′S 118°51′E

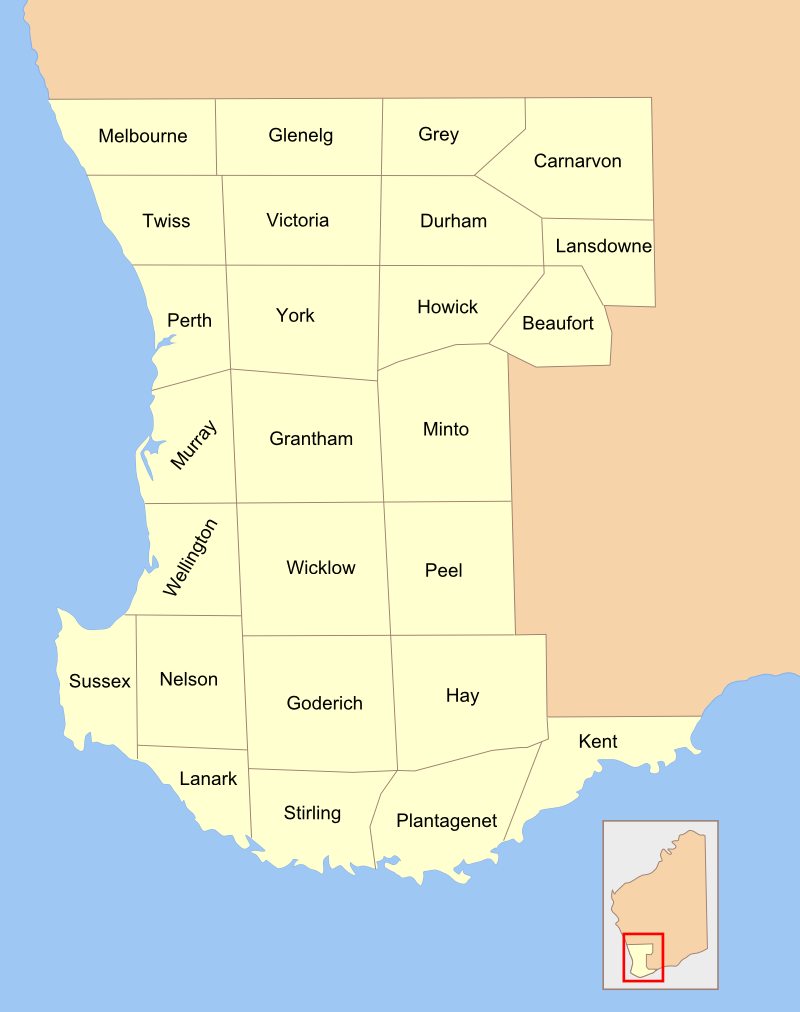
26 counties of Western Australia

Carnarvon County was one of the 26 counties of Western Australia that were designated in 1829 as cadastral divisions. It approximately corresponds to southern part of the Yilgarn Land District which was gazetted in 1903 and forms the basis for land titles in the area.
