= Grey County, Western Australia =

1829 cadastral division of Western Australia

Coordinates: 30°49′S 117°47′E

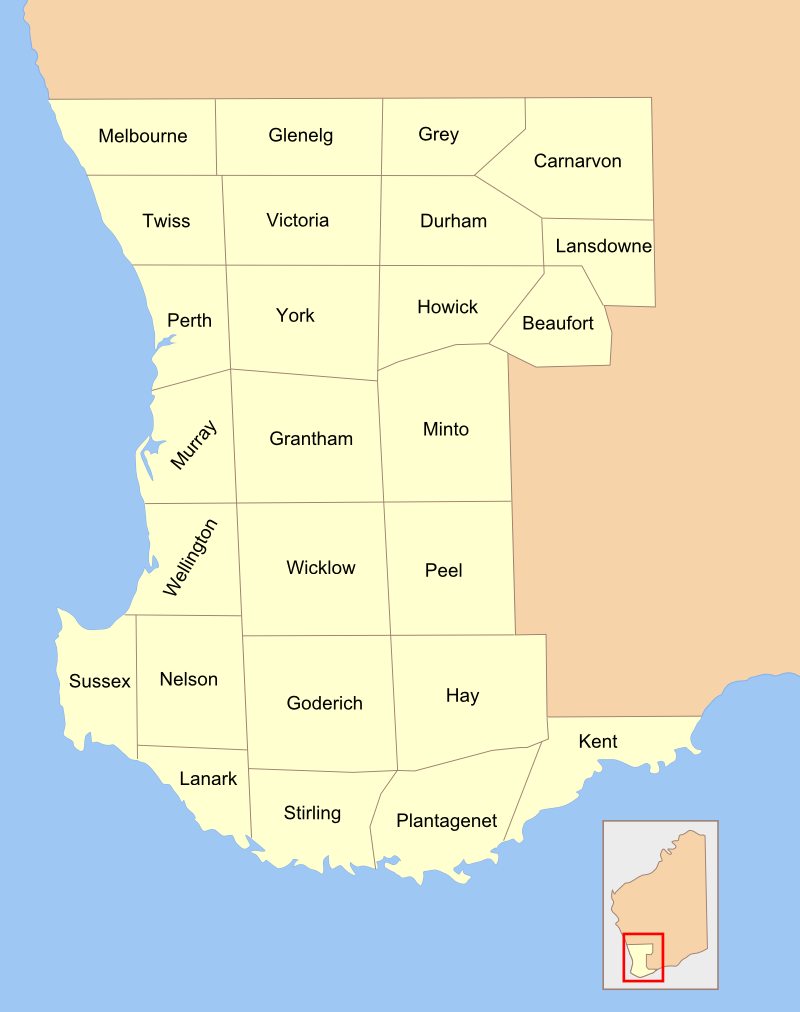
26 counties of Western Australia

Grey County was one of the 26 counties of Western Australia that were designated in 1829 as cadastral divisions. It was named after Charles Grey, 2nd Earl Grey, a powerful opposition Whig MP, who was to become Prime Minister of the United Kingdom of Great Britain and Ireland from 1830-1834. It approximately corresponds to the southern part of the Ninghan Land District which forms the basis for land titles in the area.
