= Swan Land District =

Coordinates: 31°19′56″S 115°50′05″E

Swan Western Australia
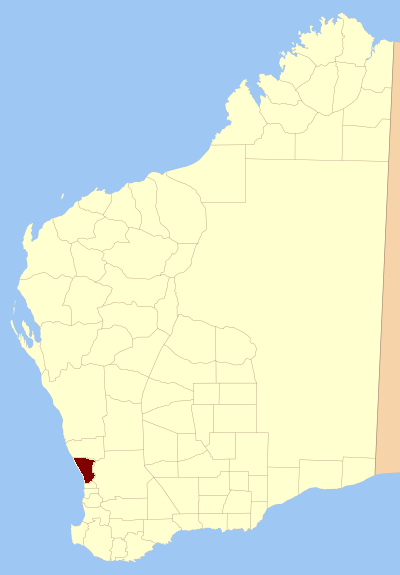
- Location in Western Australia
Lands administrative divisions around Swan:
Indian Ocean	Melbourne	Melbourne
Indian Ocean	Swan	Avon
Indian Ocean	Canning	Avon

Swan Land District is one of the land districts of Western Australia, which is located within the South West Division. It covers all of the northern and eastern suburbs of Perth, as well as some inner southern areas such as Belmont and Applecross (but not South Perth) and the area to the north up to the Moore River, including Muchea and Gingin. It is bounded on the north by the Melbourne Land District; on the east by Avon Land District; and on the south by Canning Land District. The Swan district is also famous for wine-growing and is one of Australia's oldest wine growing regions.

== Locations ==
Map showing part of Swan Location 1315 within the Swan District at Hamersley

It is subdivided into locations, including:

- Location F-M, which extend west in long, narrow strips from the Swan River at Caversham, and were granted in 1829.
- Location U-Z, extending northwest in narrow strips from the Swan River at Maylands, also granted in 1829.
- Location Au, which covers the inner northern suburbs of Balcatta, Osborne Park and Tuart Hill.
- Location 1315, which extends from northern Hamersley to Lake Goollelal, and west to the coast.
- Location 1352, a rural location past the northern suburban limits of Perth.
- Location 1370, a vast location extending from Hillarys to north of Yanchep.
