= Kent County, Western Australia =

Coordinates: 34°22′S 118°51′E

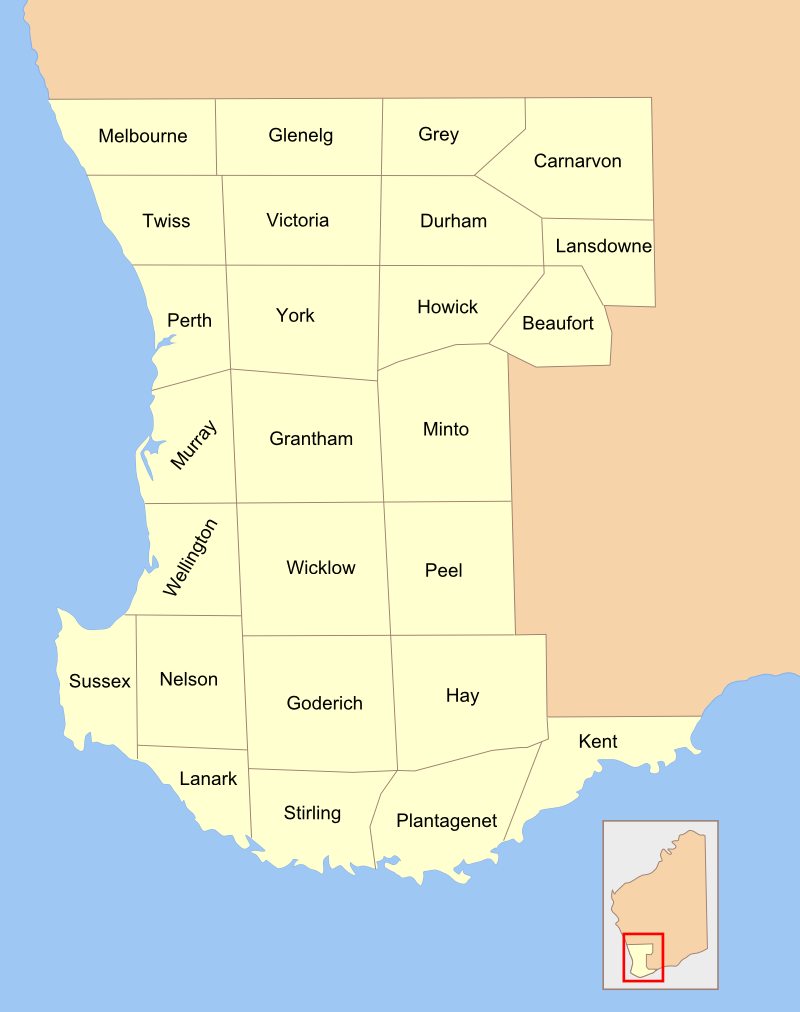
26 counties of Western Australia

Kent County was one of the 26 counties of Western Australia that were designated in 1829. It was named after Princess Alexandrina Victoria of Kent, from 1827 second in line to the throne.

It is part of the cadastral divisions of Australia. The counties were used throughout the South western region of Western Australia.
