= Victoria County, Western Australia =

Coordinates: 31°18′S 116°43′E

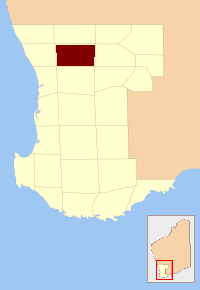
Location of Victoria county within the 26 counties of Western Australia

Victoria County was one of the twenty six counties of Western Australia that were designated in 1829. It was named after Princess Alexandrina Victoria of Kent, from 1827 second in line to the throne. It approximately corresponds to the north-western section of the Avon Land District which forms the basis for land titles in the area.
