= Glenelg County =

Former WA county

Coordinates: 30°49′S 116°43′E

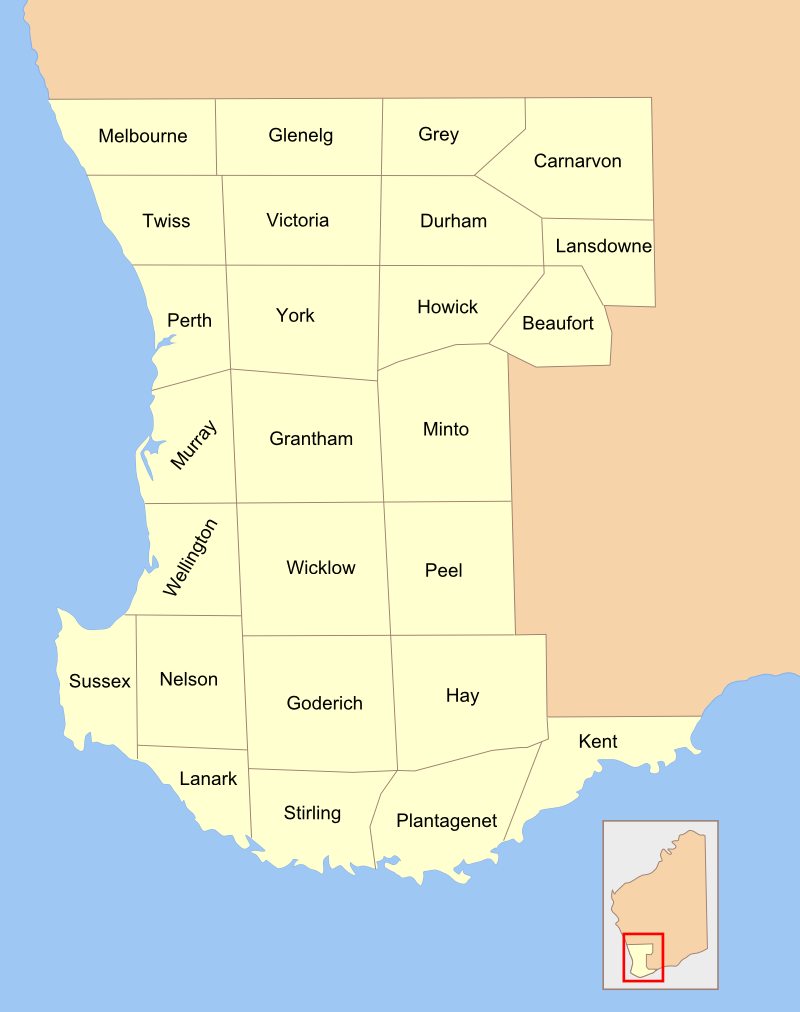
26 counties of Western Australia

Glenelg County was one of the 26 counties of Western Australia that were designated in 1829 as cadastral divisions. It was named after Charles Grant, 1st Baron Glenelg, President of the Board of Trade and Treasurer of the Navy from September 1827 to June 1828.

It approximately corresponds to the eastern part of the Melbourne Land District and the southwestern part of the Ninghan Land District which form the basis for land titles in the area.
