= York County, Western Australia =

Coordinates: 31°49′S 116°43′E

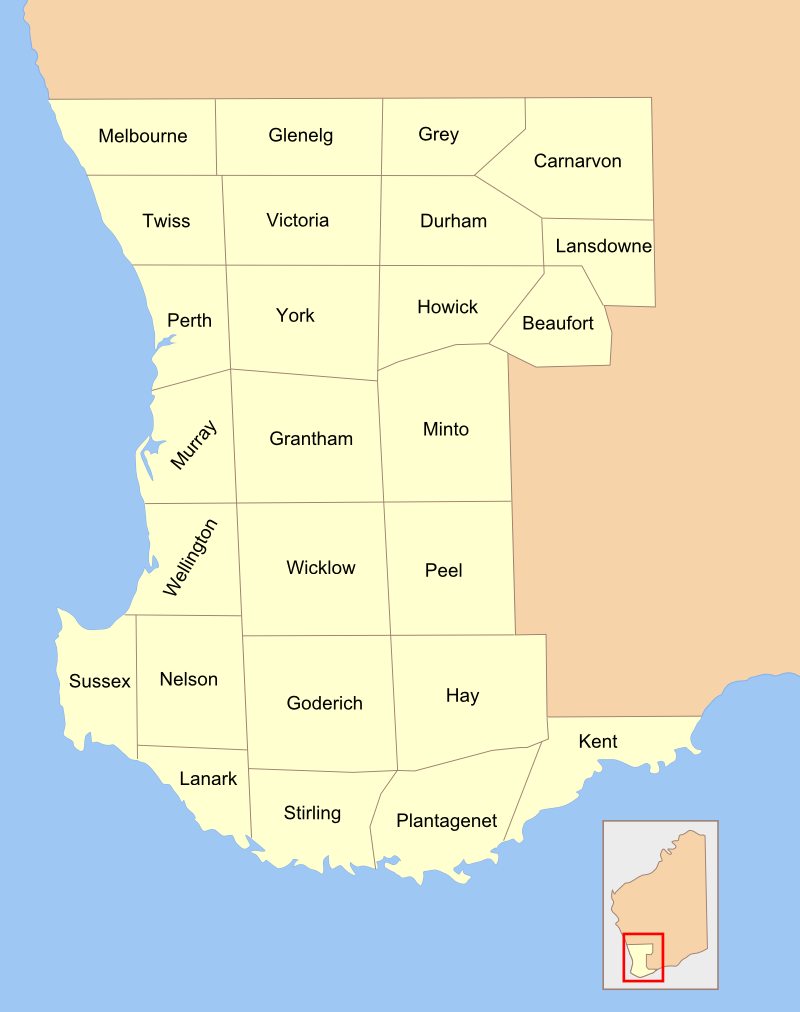
26 counties of Western Australia

York County was one of the 26 counties of Western Australia that were designated in 1829 as cadastral divisions. It was named after Prince Frederick, Duke of York and Albany, who was until his death in 1827, the heir presumptive to King George IV. It approximately corresponds to the western part of the Avon Land District which forms the basis for land titles in the area.
