= North-West Land Division =

Coordinates: 24°30′S 116°30′E

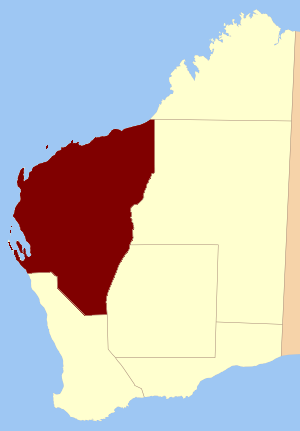
Location in Western Australia

The North-West Land Division is one of five Land Divisions of Western Australia, part of the Cadastral divisions of Western Australia. It includes Carnarvon, Exmouth and Port Hedland. It is located in the Gascoyne region, the western Pilbara region, and part of the Mid West
