= Williams Land District =

Coordinates: 32°50′S 117°50′E

Williams Western Australia
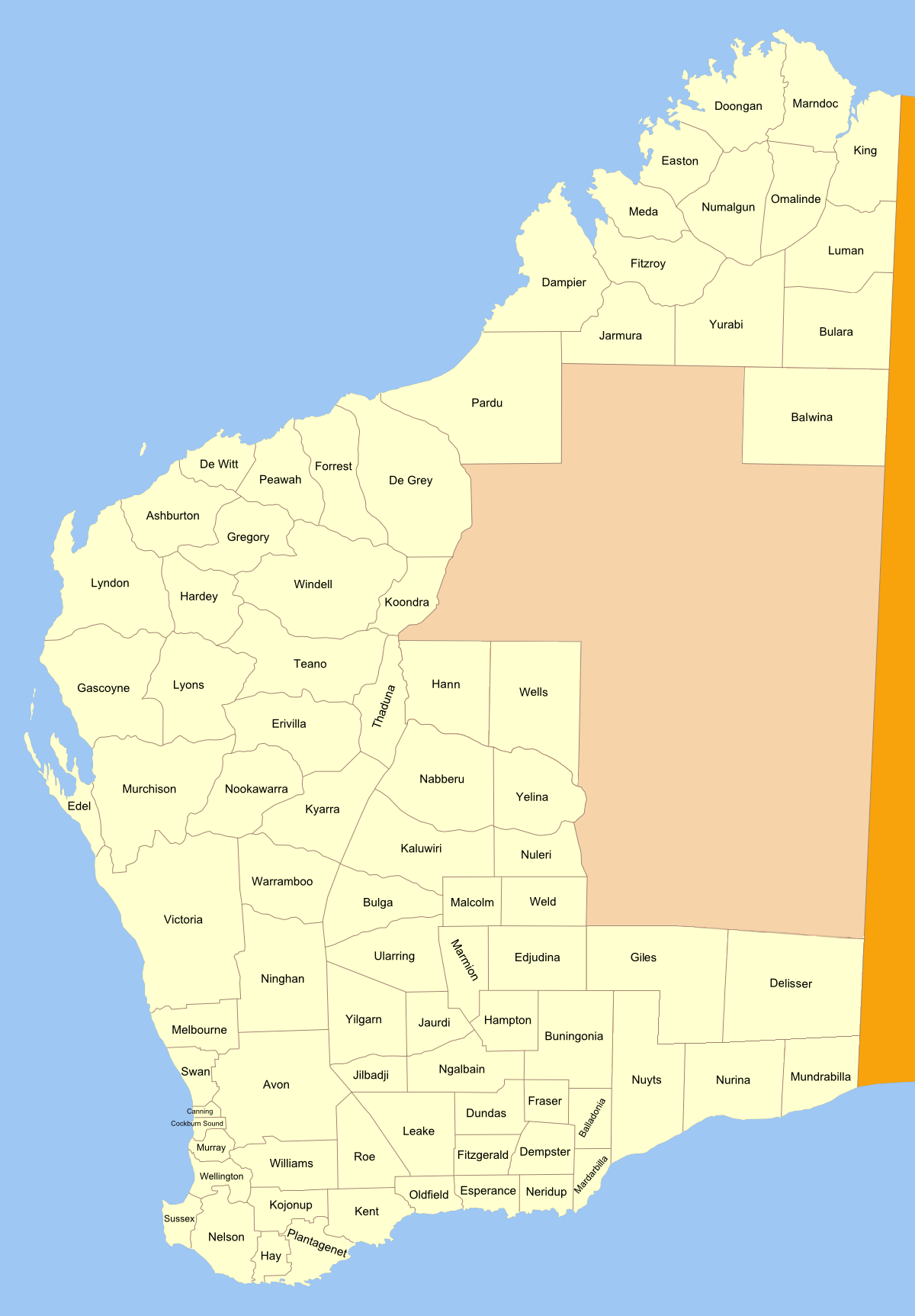

Williams Land District is a land district (cadastral division) of Western Australia, located within the South West Division.
