= South West Land Division =

South West Land Division Western Australia
- Coordinates: 31°30′S 118°00′E

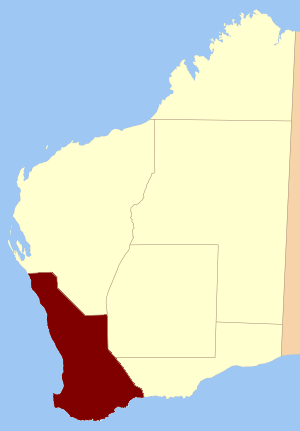
Location in Western Australia

The South West Land Division is one of five Land Divisions of Western Australia, a part of the cadastral divisions of Western Australia. It includes the cities of Perth, Albany, Bunbury, Busselton, Geraldton, and Mandurah. It also includes the regions of South West, Great Southern, Peel, most of the Wheatbelt, and the coastal areas of the Mid West.

The population of the division is about 2.2 million people, with 1.8 million living in the state capital, Perth, and a further 400,000 people living in the surrounding regional cities and rural areas. This leaves approx. 200,000 people living in the remainder of the state, most of them residing in the regional centres of Broome, Esperance, Kalgoorlie–Boulder, Karratha, and Port Hedland. Therefore, around 92% of Western Australia's population lives in this division.
