= Dundas Land District =

Dundas Western Australia
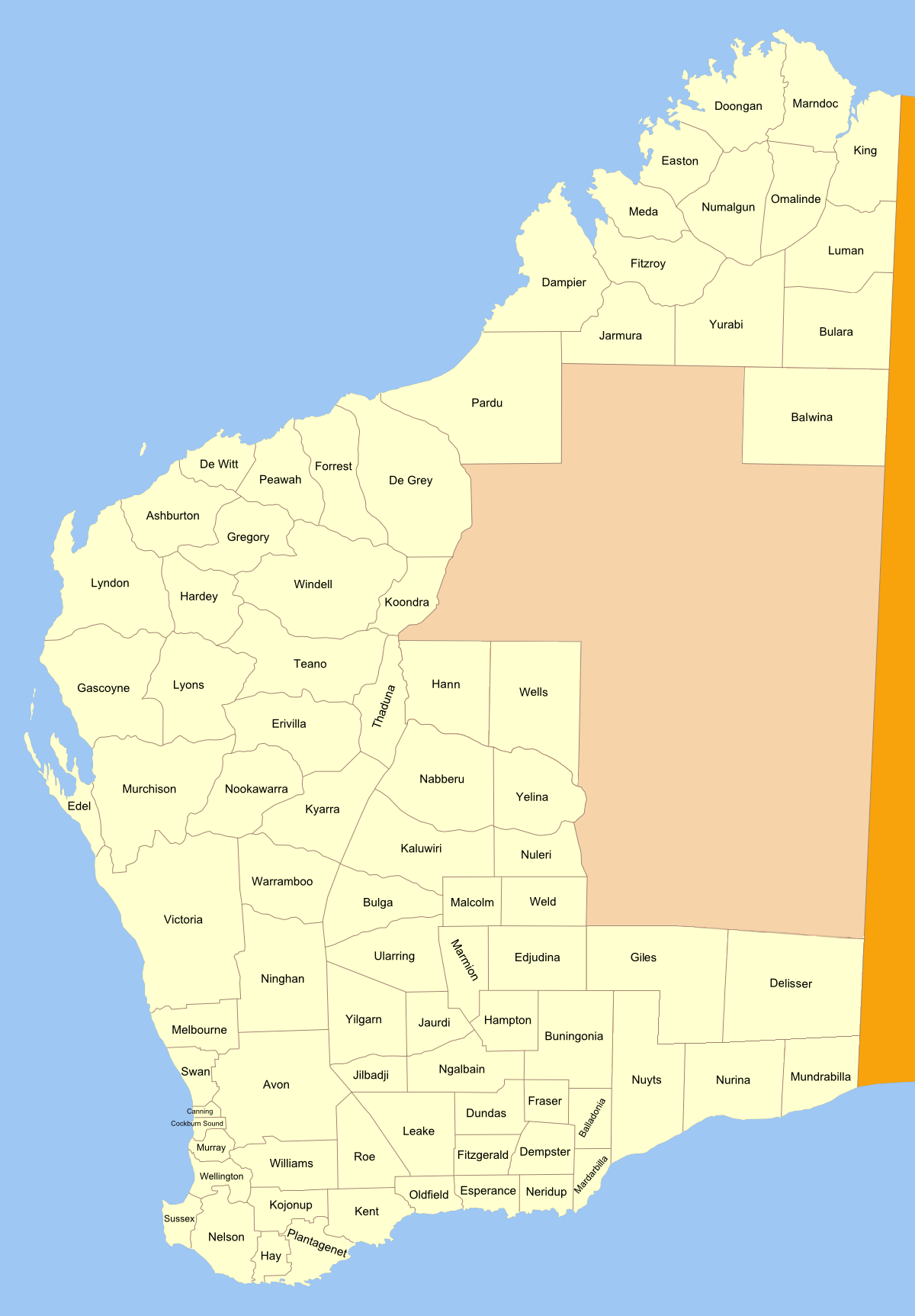
Lands administrative divisions around Dundas:
Ngalbain	Ngalbain	Buningonia
Leake	Dundas	Fraser
Leake	Fitzgerald	Dempster

Dundas Land District is a land district (cadastral division) of Western Australia within the Eucla Land Division. It spans roughly 31°40'S - 32°40'S in latitude and 121°00'E - 122°15'E in longitude.

== Location and features ==
The district is located in the western part of the Shire of Dundas between Coolgardie and Esperance. It contains four gazetted townsites, the largest of which is Norseman, the western terminus of the Eyre Highway.

Townsite	Coordinates	Gazetted	Notes
Buldania	32.068°S 122.020°E	1897	
Dundas	32.396°S 121.775°E	1895	
Norseman	32.196°S 121.778°E	1895	
Princess Royal	32.134°S 121.804°E	1904	

== History ==
The district was approved on 25 September 1897 by the Commissioner of Crown Lands. As it was approved prior to the Land Act 1898, its boundaries were never gazetted.
