= Giles Land District =

Coordinates: 30°00′S 125°20′E

Giles Western Australia
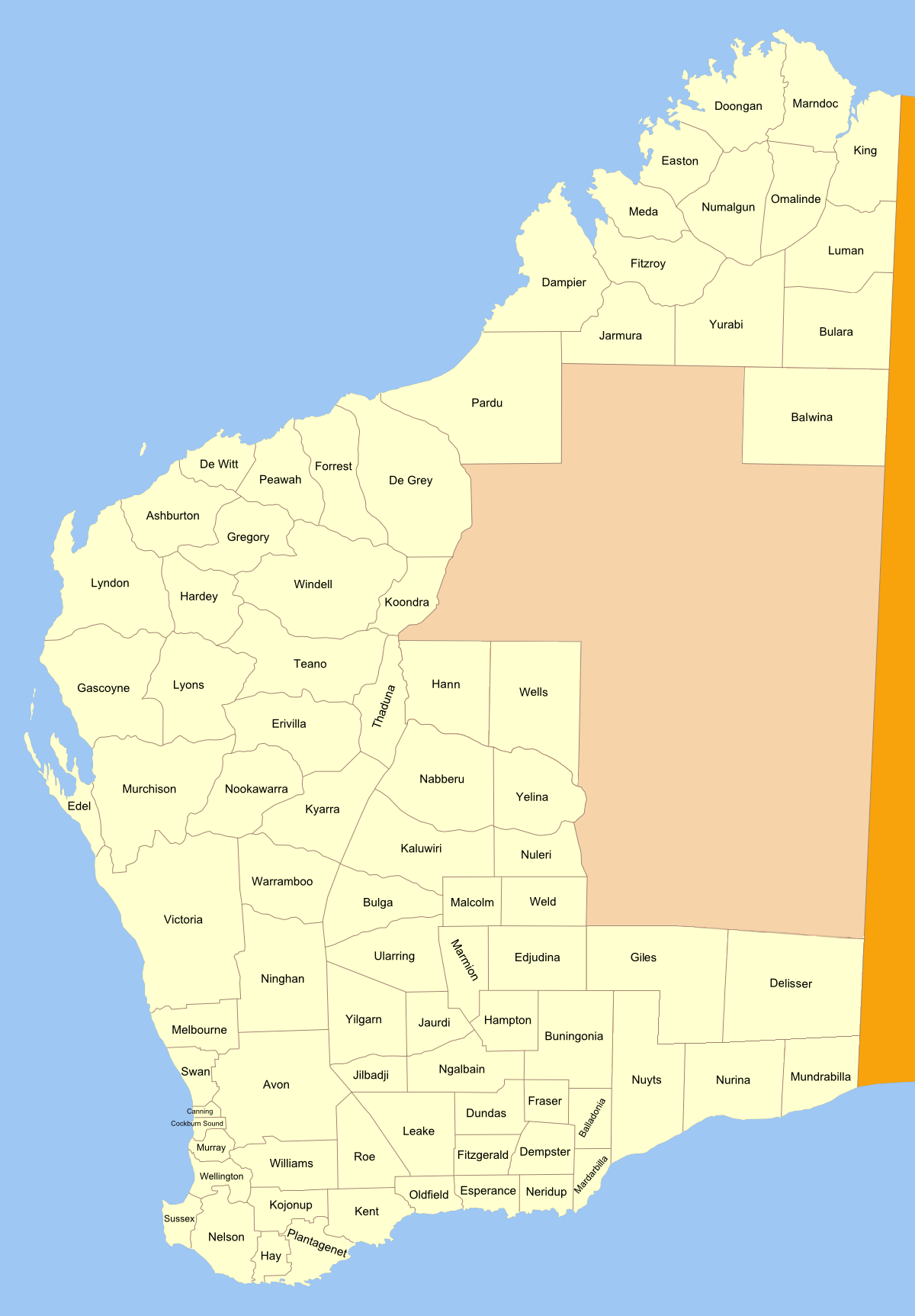
Lands administrative divisions around Giles:
Weld	Yamarna	Yowalga
Edjudina	Giles	Delisser
Buningonia	Nuyts	Nurina

Giles Land District is a land district (cadastral division) of Western Australia, located within the Eastern and Eucla land divisions on the Nullarbor Plain. It spans roughly 29°00'S - 31°00'S in latitude and 123°30'E - 126°30'E in longitude.

The district was created on 20 October 1916 and was defined in the Government Gazette:

Bounded by lines starting from a point situate South from the summit of Mt. Luck and East from survey mark B. 82 at Brickey's Soak, and extending South to a point due East of survey mark R. 3; thence East to a point South of a point 20 miles East of the South-East corner of East Location 12; thence South to the Trans-Australian Railway Line, thence Eastward along said Railway line to the 300-mile mark; thence North to a point due East of the aforesaid survey mark B. 82, and thence West to the starting point.
