= Nuyts Land District =

Coordinates: 31°35′S 124°40′E

Nuyts Western Australia
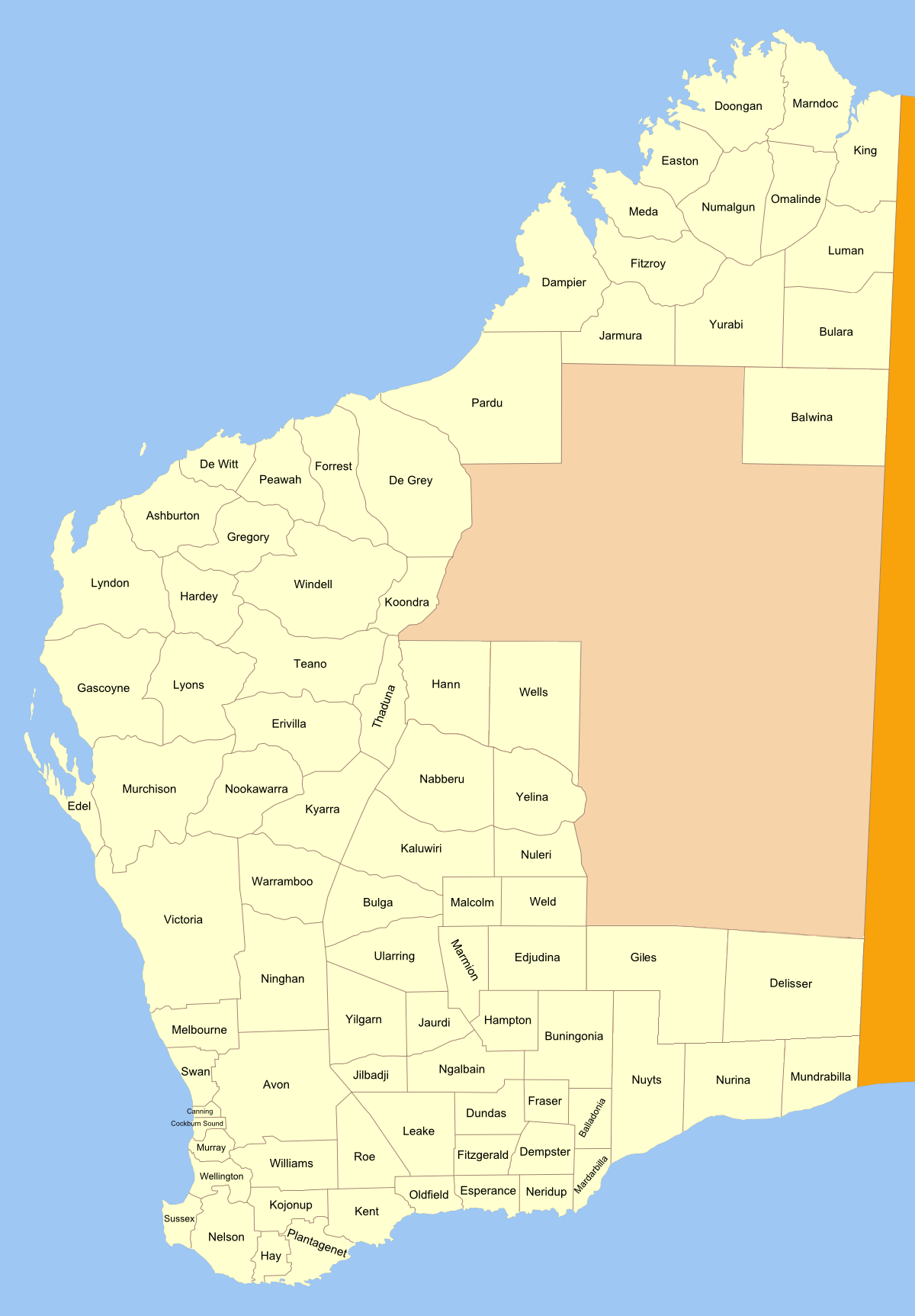
Lands administrative divisions around Nuyts:
Buningonia	Giles	Giles
Balladonia	Nuyts	Nurina
Mardarbilla	Great Australian Bight	Great Australian Bight

Nuyts Land District is a land district (cadastral division) of Western Australia, located within the Eastern and Eucla land divisions on the Nullarbor Plain. It spans roughly 31°00'S - 32°50'S in latitude and 124°00'E - 125°30'E in longitude.

== Location and features ==
The district is located on the Nullarbor Plain in the south-east of the state and falls generally between the Great Australian Bight to the south and the Trans-Australian Railway to the north. The Caiguna roadhouse on the Eyre Highway and the railway town of Rawlinna are located within its boundaries. Nuyts is the location of the Nuytsland Nature Reserve, a protected area on the southern coast of the district.

== History ==
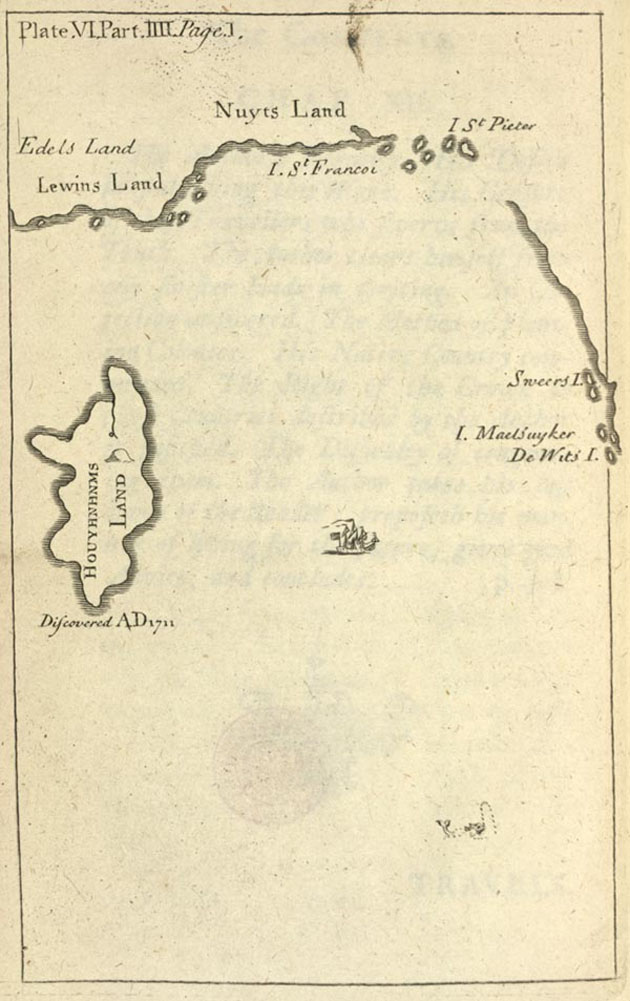
Nuyt's Land was on the map of Houyhnhnms Land in Gulliver's Travels

The district was created on 4 March 1903 and named in honor of the infamous Pieter Nuyts, the highest ranking member of the Dutch East India Company aboard the 't Gulden Zeepaert when it mapped the southwestern Australian coast, after which it was sometimes mapped as Nuytsland (French: Terre de Nuits). The district originally only extended north to 31°30'S latitude. When the Trans-Australian Railway was being built in 1914, the district was extended northwards and was defined in the Government Gazette:

Bounded on the North by the centre of the Trans-Australian Railway Line; on the East by a North line from Point Dover; on the West by a North and South line through a point situate 20 miles East from the South-East corner of East Location 12, and on the South by the sea coast.
