= Yamarna Land District =

Coordinates: 27°55′S 124°15′E

Yamarna Western Australia
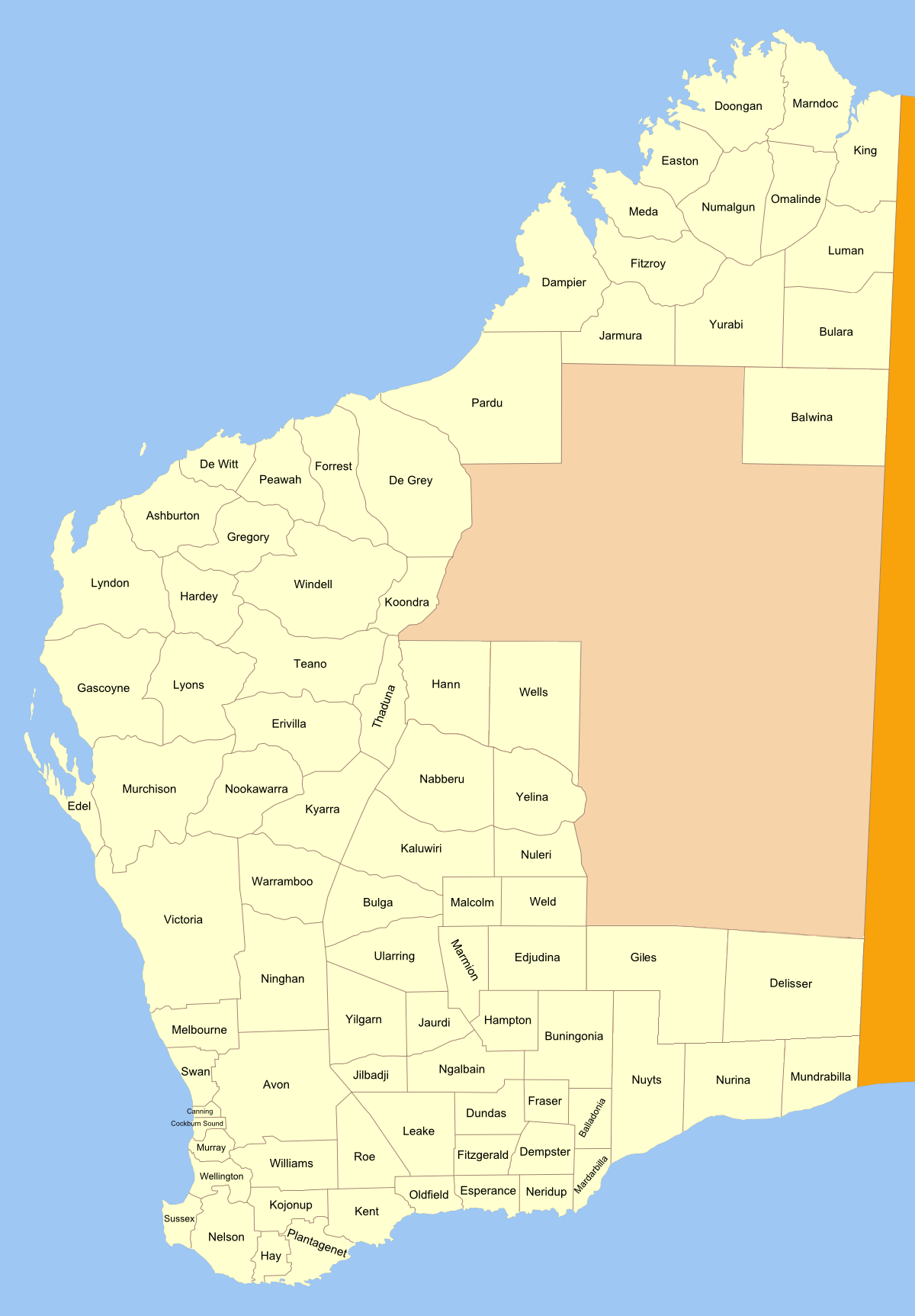
Lands administrative divisions around Yamarna:
Yelina	Tugaila	Tugaila
Nuleri; Weld	Yamarna	Yowalga
Edjudina	Giles	Giles

Yamarna Land District is a land district (cadastral division) of Western Australia, located within the Eastern Land Division in the Great Victoria Desert, north of the Nullarbor Plain. It spans roughly 26°50'S - 29°00'S in latitude and 123°30'E - 125°00'E in longitude.

== History ==
The district was created on 19 February 1930, and was defined in the Government Gazette:

Bounded by lines starting from the summit of Kyffin Thomas Hill and extending East to longitude 125 deg. East; thence South to a point situate East from Survey Mark B82 at Brickey's Soak; thence West to a point situate South from the summit of Mt. Luck; thence North passing through said summit to a point East from Survey Mark JHR23; thence North-Westerly through the summit of Mt. Grant to the summit of Mt. Shenton; thence Northerly to the cairn on Mt. Cumming; thence North to a point situate East from Stirling Peaks, and thence Northward to the starting point.
