= Fraser Land District =

Coordinates: 32°00′S 122°45′E

Fraser Western Australia
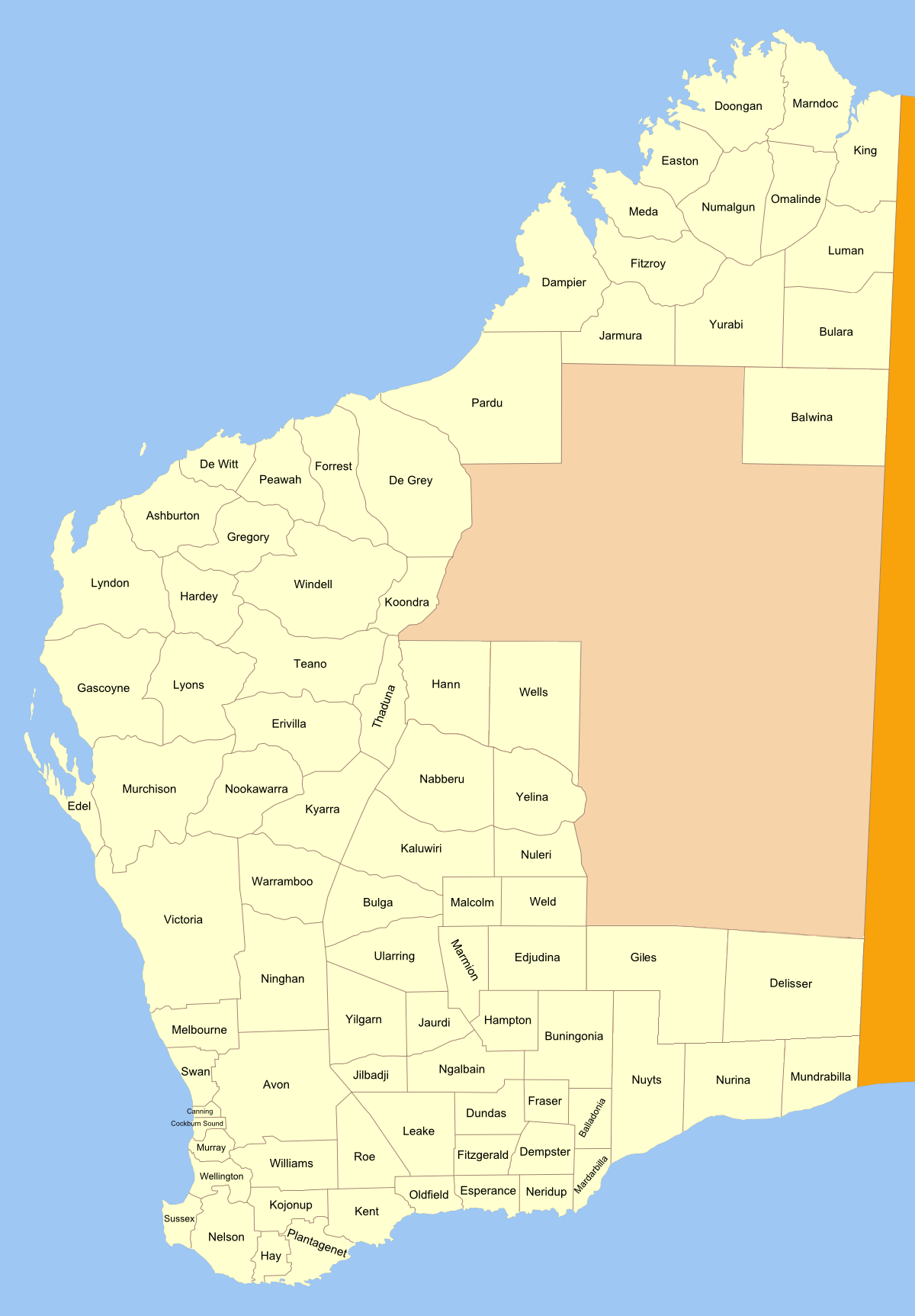
Lands administrative divisions around Fraser:
Ngalbain	Buningonia	Buningonia
Dundas	Fraser	Balladonia
Dundas	Dempster	Dempster

Fraser Land District is a land district (cadastral division) of Western Australia partly within the Eucla and Eastern divisions of the state. It spans roughly 31°40'S - 32°25'S in latitude and 122°15'E - 123°10'E in longitude.

== Location and features ==
The district is located on the Nullarbor Plain about half-way between the towns of Norseman and Balladonia. The Eyre Highway forms part of the southern boundary of the district, and the Fraser Range is entirely contained within it.

== History ==
The district was approved on 3 September 1897 by the Commissioner of Crown Lands. As it was approved prior to the Land Act 1898, its boundaries were never gazetted.
