= Neridup =

Neridup may refer to:

- Neridup, Western Australia, a locality of the Shire of Esperance
- Neridup Land District, a land district of Western Australia
