= Eastern Land Division =

- Land division
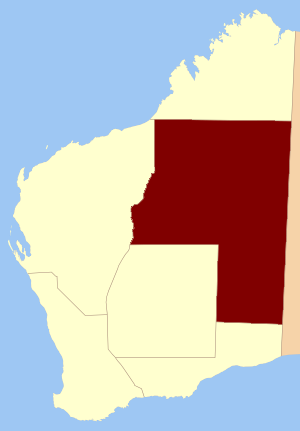
- Location within Western Australia prior to 1917
- Country: Australia
- State: Western Australia
- Regions: Goldfields–Esperance; Pilbara
- Land districts: 40 land districts

The Eastern Land Division is one of five cadastral divisions of Western Australia, within the eastern parts of the Goldfields-Esperance region and the Pilbara region. Most of its territory is covered by deserts, including the part of the Great Sandy Desert, Gibson Desert and Great Victoria Desert.

== History ==
The Eastern Land Division was created on 2 March 1887, in a reform to the land divisions. On 28 March 1917, the Central Land Division had been incorporated into the Eastern Land Division. The current boundaries of the land were enacted on 30 March 1998.

Prior to the construction of the Trans-Australian Railway in 1917, the Eastern Land Division, which consists almost entirely of the Great Victoria and Great Sandy Deserts, did not contain any districts.

== Subdivisions ==
The Eastern Land Division is subdivided into 40 land districts.

District	Location	Created	Notes
Balladonia	32°15′S 123°35′E	1897	Partially located within Eucla Land Division
Balwina	20°15′S 127°40′E	1928	
Bulga	28°25′S 119°40′E	1903	
Buningonia	31°05′S 123°05′E	1903	
Delisser	30°00′S 127°45′E	1916	
Dempster	32°40′S 122°55′E	1897	Partially located within Eucla Land Division
Edjudina	29°25′S 122°35′E	1903	
Fraser	32°00′S 122°45′E	1897	Partially located within Eucla Land Division
Giles	30°00′S 125°20′E	1916	Partially located within Eucla Land Division
Hampton	30°50′S 121°40′E	1899	
Hann	24°50′S 120°50′E	1925	
Jaurdi	30°25′S 120°50′E	1903	
Jilbadji	31°25′S 119°25′E	1903	
Kaluwiri	27°50′S 120°40′E	1903	
Malcolm	28°50′S 121°20′E	1900	
Marmion	29°40′S 121°10′E	1899	
Milyuga	25°25′S 127°25′E	1932	
Nabberu	26°35′S 120°10′E	1903	
Ngalbain	31°20′S 121°10′E	1903	
Nuleri	27°40′S 122°10′E	1903	
Pardu	19°50′S 120°40′E	1906	Partially located within Kimberley and North-West Land Divisions
Tugaila	25°25′S 124°25′E	1932	
Ularring	29°25′S 120°05′E	1903	
Wanman	22°10′S 123°50′E	1950s	
Weld	28°40′S 122°25′E	1901	
Wells	25°15′S 122°30′E	1925	
Yamarna	28°10′S 123°40′E	1930	
Yelina	26°20′S 122°10′E	1903	
Yilgarn	30°50′S 119°05′E	1900	
Yowalga	27°55′S 127°00′E	1932	
