= Nurina Land District =

Coordinates: 31°40′S 126°30′E

Nurina
- Cadastral division
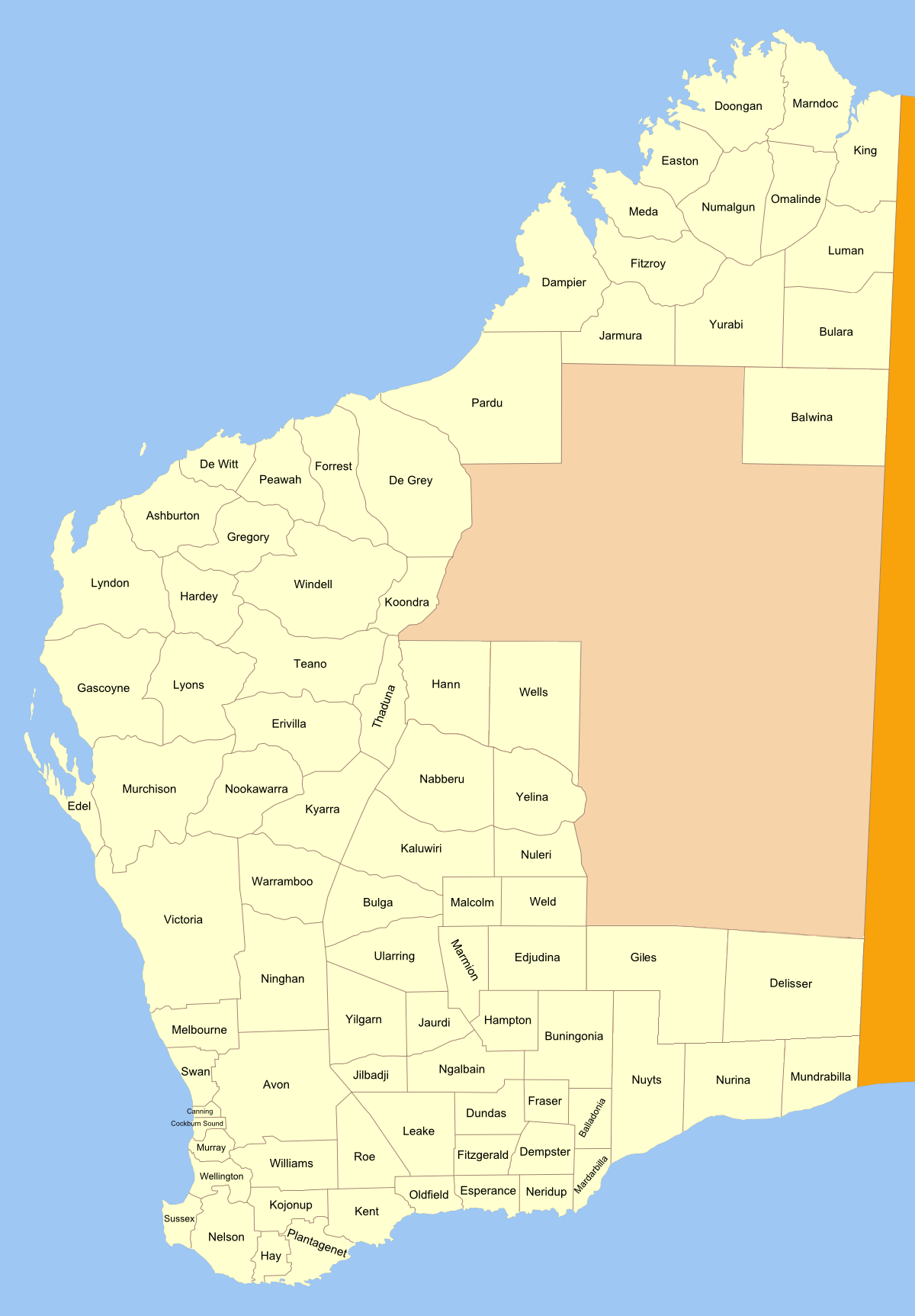
- Country: Australia
- State: Western Australia
Lands administrative divisions around Nurina
Giles	Giles	Delisser
Nuyts	Nurina	Mundrabilla
Nuyts	Great Australian Bight	Great Australian Bight

Nurina Land District is a land district (cadastral division) of Western Australia, located within the Eucla Land Division on the Nullarbor Plain. It spans roughly 31°00'S - 32°20'S in latitude and 125°30'E - 127°30'E in longitude.

== Location and features ==
The district is located on the Nullarbor Plain in the south-east of the state and falls generally between the Great Australian Bight to the south and the Trans-Australian Railway to the north. The Cocklebiddy and Madura roadhouses on the Eyre Highway, the railway siding of Loongana and much of the Nuytsland Nature Reserve are located within its boundaries.

== History ==
The district was created on 4 March 1903, but only extended north to 31°15'S latitude. When the Trans-Australian Railway was being built in 1914, the district was extended northwards and was defined in the Government Gazette:

Bounded on the North by the centre of the Trans-Australian Railway Line; on the East by a North line from Red Rock Point through Survey Mark E11; on the West by a North line from Point Dover, and on the South by the sea coast.
