= Acacia gibbosa =

Scientific classification
- Kingdom: Plantae
- Clade: Embryophytes
- Clade: Tracheophytes
- Clade: Angiosperms
- Clade: Eudicots
- Clade: Rosids
- Order: Fabales
- Family: Fabaceae
- Subfamily: Caesalpinioideae
- Clade: Mimosoid clade
- Genus: Acacia
- Species: A. gibbosa

Binomial name
- Acacia gibbosa R.S.Cowan & Maslin
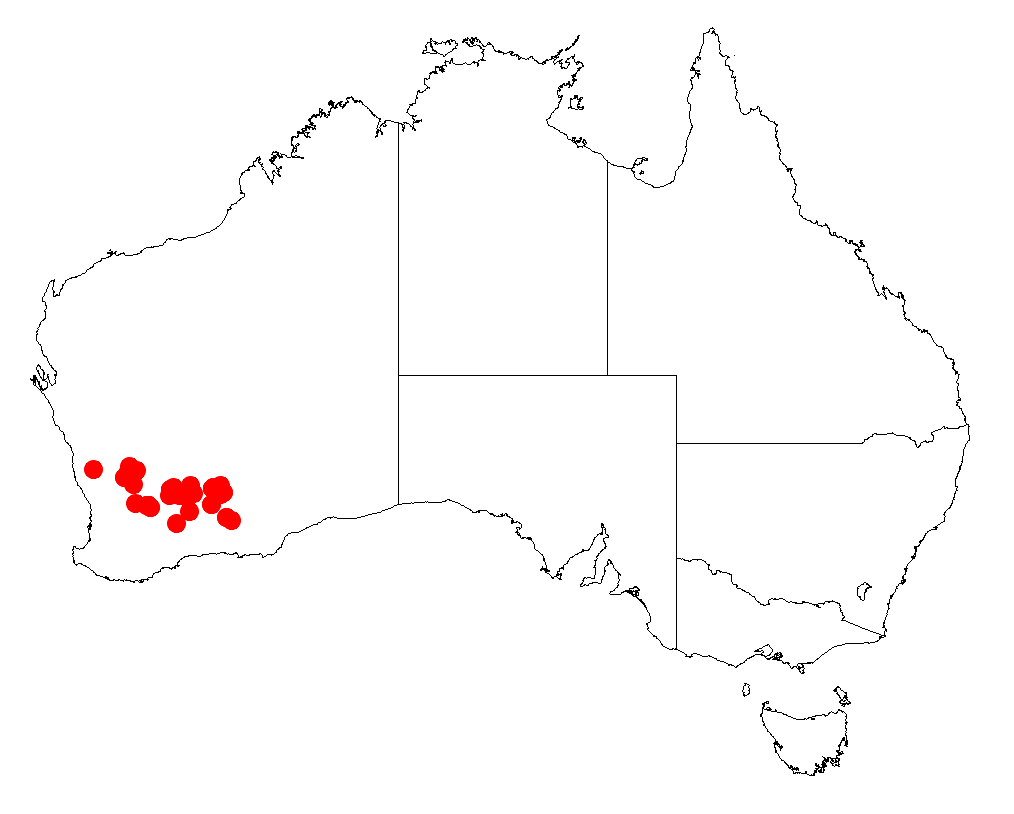
- Occurrence data from AVH

Synonyms
- Racosperma gibbosum (R.S.Cowan & Maslin) Pedley; Acacia cyperophylla auct. non F.Muell. ex Benth.: Diels, F.L.E. & Pritzel, E.G. (6 December 1904)

Species of plant

Acacia gibbosa is a species of flowering plant in the family Fabaceae and is endemic to the south-west of Western Australia. It is a dense, rounded shrub or tree with glabrous branchlets, narrowly linear phyllodes, oblong to cylindrical head of golden yellow flowers and linear, thinly firmly papery pods.

== Description ==
Acacia gibbosa is rounded shrub or tree that typically grows to a height of 1–3 m (3 ft 3 in – 9 ft 10 in) and has glabrous branchlets. Its phyllodes are narrowly linear, straight to slightly curved and terete, 40–95 mm (1.6–3.7 in) long, 0.8–1.5 mm (0.031–0.059 in) wide, green to grey-green and glabrous. The flowers are borne in pairs of oblong or short cylindrical heads on peduncles 1.5–4 mm (0.059–0.157 in) long, each head 6–8 mm (0.24–0.31 in) long and 4.0–4.5 mm (0.16–0.18 in) in diameter with 22 to 27 golden yellow flowers. Flowering occurs in August and September, and the pods are linear, straight, up to 65 mm (2.6 in) long, 2.0–2.5 mm (0.079–0.098 in) wide, glabrous and firmly papery. The seeds are narrowly oblong, 2.8–3.0 mm (0.11–0.12 in) long and glossy black with a crested aril.

== Taxonomy ==
Acacia gibbosa was first formally described in 1995 by the botanists Richard Sumner Cowan and Bruce Maslin in the journal Nuytsia from specimens collected by Maslin 4.5 mi (7.2 km) north-west of Southern Cross towards Bullfinch in 1971. The specific epithet (gibbosa) means 'hunch-backed', and refers to the peduncular bracts that have a gibbosity on the upper side.

== Distribution and habitat ==
This species of wattle grows in low-lying areas and on undulating plains in woodland, scrub and shrubland between Koorda and Kellerberrin and east to the Coolgardie area and Dundas in the Avon Wheatbelt, Coolgardie, Geraldton Sandplains and Mallee bioregions of south-western Western Australia.

== Conservation status ==
Acacia gibbosa is listed as "not threatened" by the Government of Western Australia Department of Biodiversity, Conservation and Attractions.

== See also ==
- List of Acacia species
