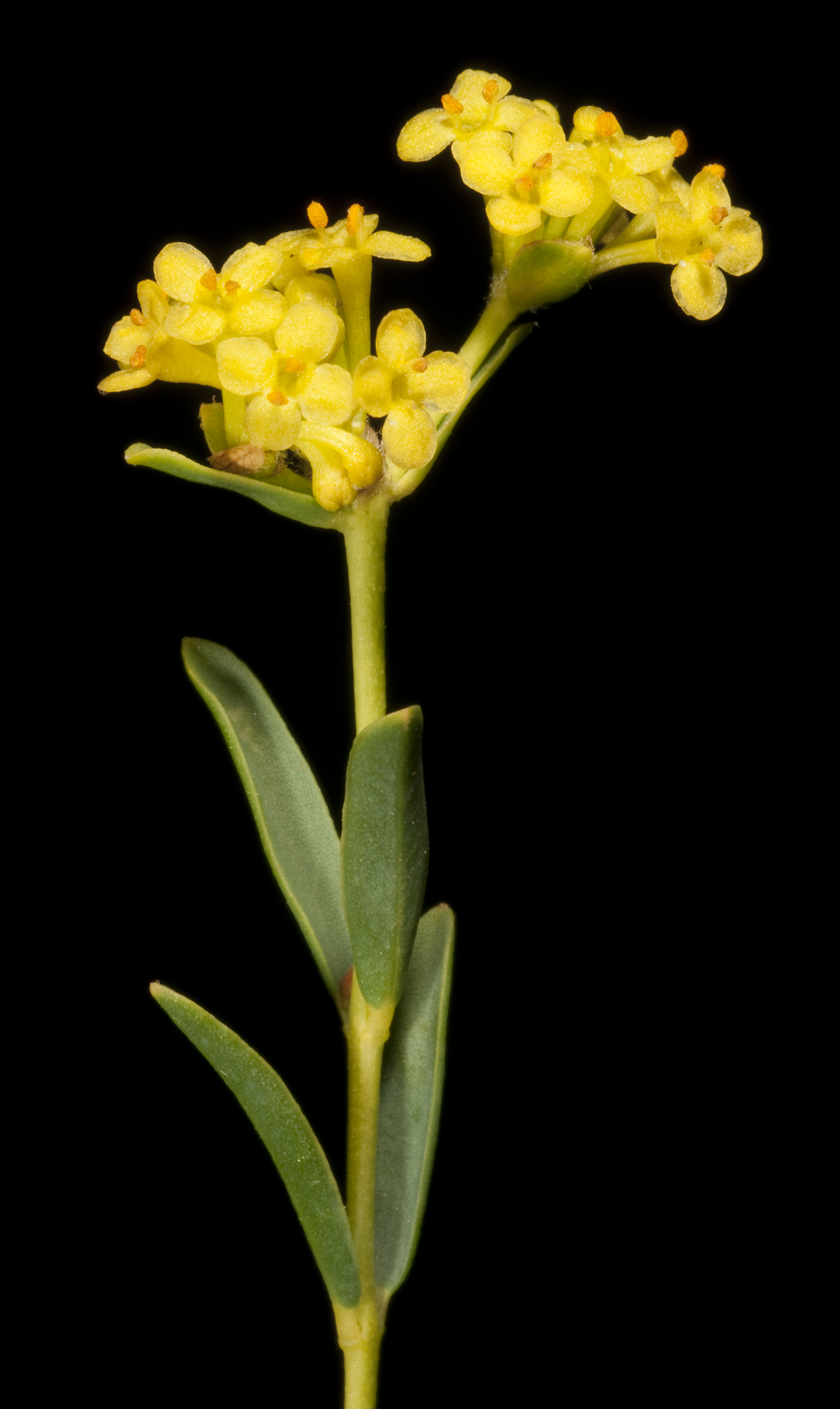

Scientific classification
- Kingdom: Plantae
- Clade: Tracheophytes
- Clade: Angiosperms
- Clade: Eudicots
- Clade: Rosids
- Order: Malvales
- Family: Thymelaeaceae
- Genus: Pimelea
- Species: P. spiculigera

Binomial name
- Pimelea spiculigera F.Muell.

Synonyms
- Banksia spiculigera (F.Muell.) Kuntze

= Pimelea spiculigera =

Species of shrub

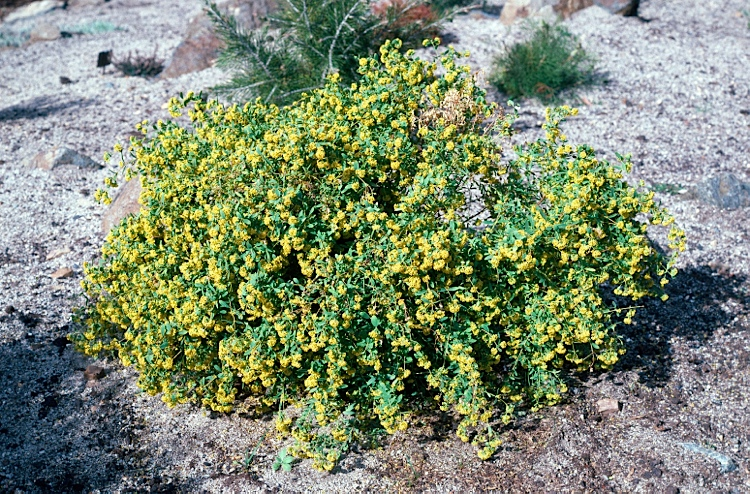
Pimelea spiculigera var. thesioides in the Australian National Botanic Gardens

Pimelea spiculigera is a species of flowering plant in the family Thymelaeaceae and is endemic to Western Australia. It is an erect shrub with linear to narrowly egg-shaped leaves and heads of yellow or greenish-yellow flowers surrounded by 2 or 4 egg-shaped involucral bracts.

== Description ==
Pimelea spiculigera is an erect shrub that typically grows to a height of 0.2–2 m (7.9 in – 6 ft 6.7 in) and has glabrous stems. The leaves are arranged in opposite pairs, linear to narrowly egg-shaped, sometimes with the narrower end towards the base, 4–26 mm (0.16–1.02 in) long and 0.7–3.5 mm (0.028–0.138 in) wide on a petiole 0.3–1.3 mm (0.012–0.051 in) long. Both surfaces of the leaves are glabrous, and the same shade of medium green. The flowers are glabrous, yellow or greenish-yellow and arranged in one or two heads, surrounded by 2 or 4 egg-shaped, medium green involucral bracts 2–10 mm (0.079–0.394 in) long and 1.5–3.0 mm (0.059–0.118 in) wide. Each flower is on a densely hairy pedicel 0.3–0.7 mm (0.012–0.028 in) long. The flower tube of male flowers is 3.0–5.5 mm (0.12–0.22 in) long, the sepals 1.3–1.7 mm (0.051–0.067 in) long, the stamens shorter than the sepals. The flower tube of female flowers is 2–3 mm (0.079–0.118 in) long, the sepals 0.8–1 mm (0.031–0.039 in) long. Flowering occurs from July to October.

== Taxonomy ==
Pimelea spiculigera was first formally described in 1878 by Ferdinand von Mueller in his Fragmenta Phytographiae Australiae. The specific epithet (spiculigera) means "carrying a small flower spike".

In 1988, Barbara Lynette Rye described two varieties of P. spiculigera in the journal Nuytsia, and the names are accepted by the Australian Plant Census:

- Pimelea spiculigera F.Muell. var. spiculigera has an elongated flower cluster at maturity, the floral rachis up to 11 mm (0.43 in) long.
- Pimelea spiculigera var. thesioides (S.Moore) Rye (previously known as Pimelea thesioides S.Moore) has a compact flower cluster at maturity, the floral rachis 1–2 mm (0.039–0.079 in) long.

== Distribution and habitat ==
This pimelea grows on granite outcrops and laterite from near Mullewa to Cundeelee and Mount Beaumont (north of Cape Arid National Park), in the Avon Wheatbelt, Coolgardie, Mallee, Murchison and Yalgoo bioregions of Western Australia. Variety spiculigera has a more limited distribution than var. thesioides, occurring from the Fraser Range (north-east of Dundas) to Mount Beaumont in the Coolgardie and Mallee bioregions.

== Conservation status ==
Pimelea spiculigera and both of its varieties are listed as "not threatened" by the Government of Western Australia Department of Biodiversity, Conservation and Attractions.
