= Mundrabilla =

Mundrabilla may refer to:

- Mundrabilla, Western Australia
- Mundrabilla Land District

== See also ==
- Mundrabilla (meteorite), large meteorite found in Australia
