= Malcolm Land District =

Coordinates: 28°50′S 121°20′E

Malcolm Western Australia
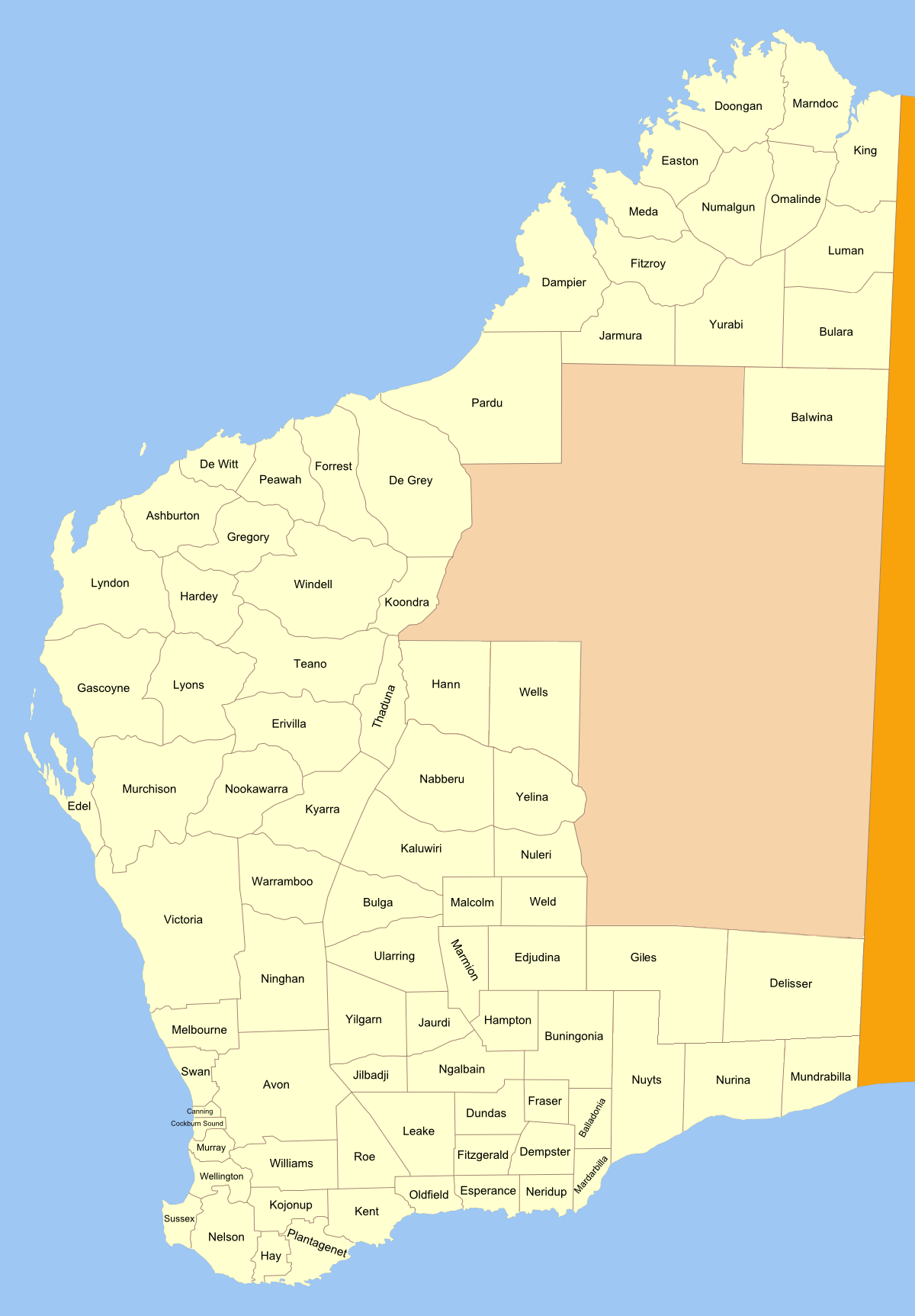
Lands administrative divisions around Malcolm:
Bulga	Kaluwiri	Nuleri
Bulga	Malcolm	Weld
Ularring	Marmion	Edjudina

Malcolm Land District is a land district (cadastral division) of Western Australia, located within the Eastern Land Division in the northern Goldfields region of the state.

== Location and features ==
The district is located in the northern Goldfields region, and contains the town of Leonora and the former towns of Gwalia, Malcolm, Kurrajong and Mertondale.

== History ==
The district was created on 22 August 1900, and was amended on 8 May 1907. It was described in the Government Gazette thus:

Bounded by lines starting from a point situate 2 miles 10 chains West from Survey mark B82, at Brickey's Soak, and extending West to a point situate South from the 24-mile post on the Lawlers–Leonora telegraph line; thence North through the said 24-mile post to a point situate West of Survey mark AN62; thence East through the said survey mark AN62 to a point situate North from the starting point; thence South to the starting point.
