= Mardarbilla Land District =

Coordinates: 33°25′S 123°45′E

Mardarbilla Western Australia
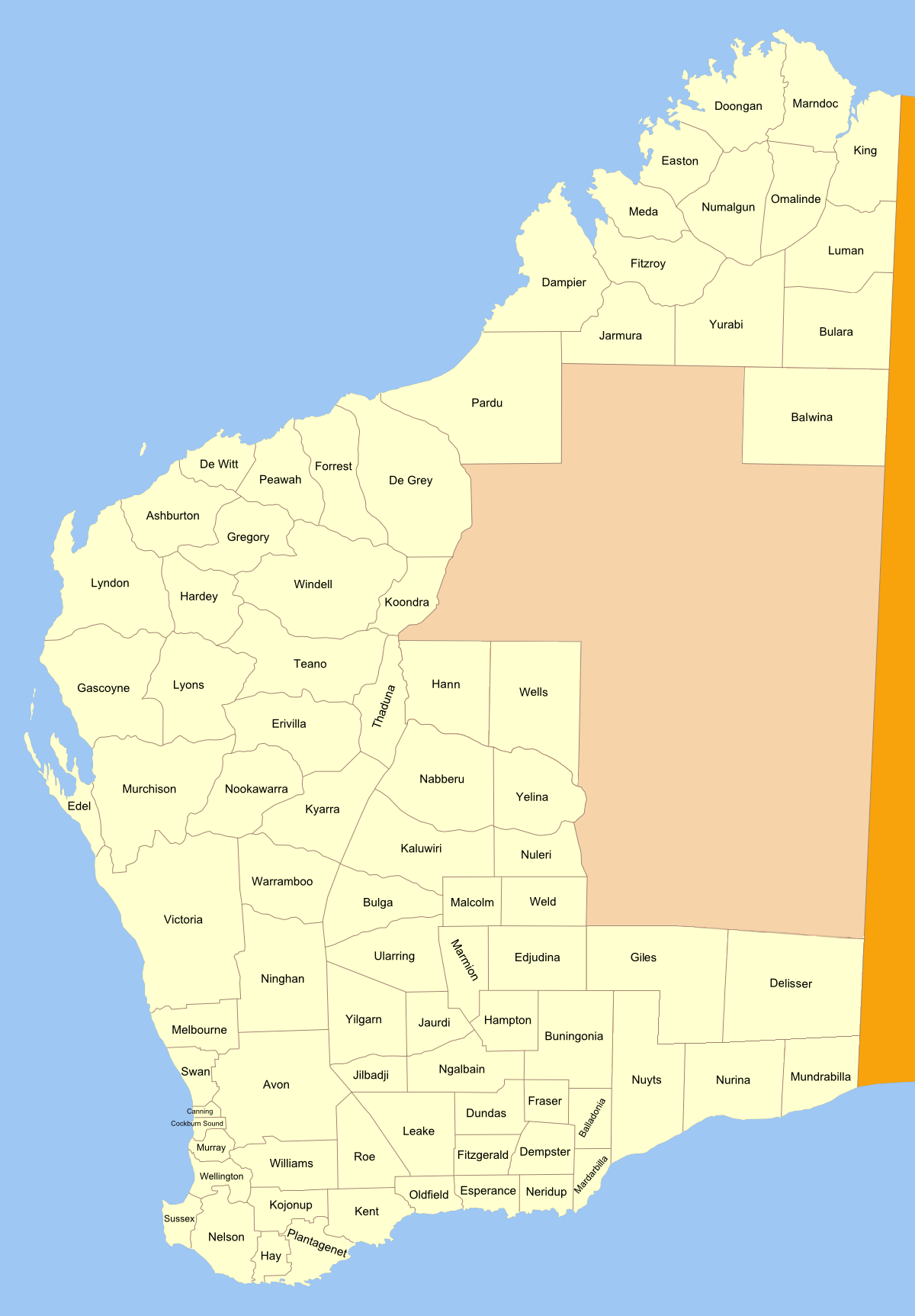
Lands administrative divisions around Mardarbilla:
Dempster	Balladonia	Nuyts
Neridup	Mardarbilla	Great Australian Bight
Neridup	Southern Ocean	Southern Ocean

Mardarbilla Land District is a land district (cadastral division) of Western Australia located within the Eucla Land Division on the western edge of the Great Australian Bight. It spans roughly 32°40'S – 33°55'S in latitude and 123°30'E – 124°00'E in longitude. Much of the district is within the Cape Arid National Park, and it contains the town of Israelite Bay.

== History ==
The district was approved on 3 September 1897 by the Commissioner of Crown Lands, who attached a qualification: "In this and similar cases where we adopt these out of the way names, in parenthesis it should be made clear to the reader the part of the country in which the lands exist." As it was approved prior to the Land Act 1898, its boundaries were never gazetted.
