= Buldania, Western Australia =

Buldania Western Australia
- Coordinates: 32°2′24″S 122°1′20″E
- Population: 0 (abandoned)
- Established: 1896
- Postcode(s): 6443
- Location: 34 km (21 mi) north-east of Norseman
- LGA(s): Shire of Dundas

Buldania is an abandoned town north-east of Norseman in the Goldfields-Esperance region of Western Australia. The small townsite, located about 8 kilometres (5 mi) north of the Eyre Highway, serviced a field which was discovered in June 1896 by Arthur Bell. Despite the high yield of ore which was obtained, progress was slow due to the difficult terrain of the Fraser Range (being primarily composed of hard quartz below the surface) combined with a lack of capital to develop the area. By the end of 1897 it had a population of 51, notably including only one female. By April 1901, this had fallen to 18 and by 1903, the Western Argus noted the area was "unfortunately practically deserted". This was confirmed by an official report in May 1906: "Some 10 or 11 leases have at times been applied for and worked to some extent. All are now abandoned, and the field quite deserted."
