= Princess Royal, Western Australia =

Abandoned town in Western Australia

Princess Royal
- Town
- Interactive map of Princess Royal
- Coordinates: 32.134°S 121.804°E
- Country: Australia
- State: Western Australia
- LGA: Shire of Dundas
- Location: 734 km (456 mi) east of Perth; 8 km (5.0 mi) north of Norseman
- Established: 1904

Government
  - State electorate: Eyre
  - Federal division: O'Connor
- Elevation: 291 m (955 ft)
- Postcode: 6443

Princess Royal is an abandoned town in the Goldfields–Esperance region in Western Australia. It was named after a gold mine that was the basis for the town. The mine was named after Victoria, Princess Royal, eldest daughter of Queen Victoria. It was located near Norseman.

A rich gold reef was discovered in the area in the 1895 by a party of prospectors – Chester, Peddler and Flanagan. Alluvial gold was later found in 1900 and a townsite was established to house the miners. The townsite was gazetted in 1904. At one stage there were two adjacent mines- Princess Royal, and Princess Royal Central.

A police station was built before 1905 and the first officer in charge arrived in that year; the station later closed in 1908. The town boasted four hotels in 1906, as well as a host of other businesses.
