= Delisser Land District =

Coordinates: 30°00′S 127°45′E

Delisser Western Australia
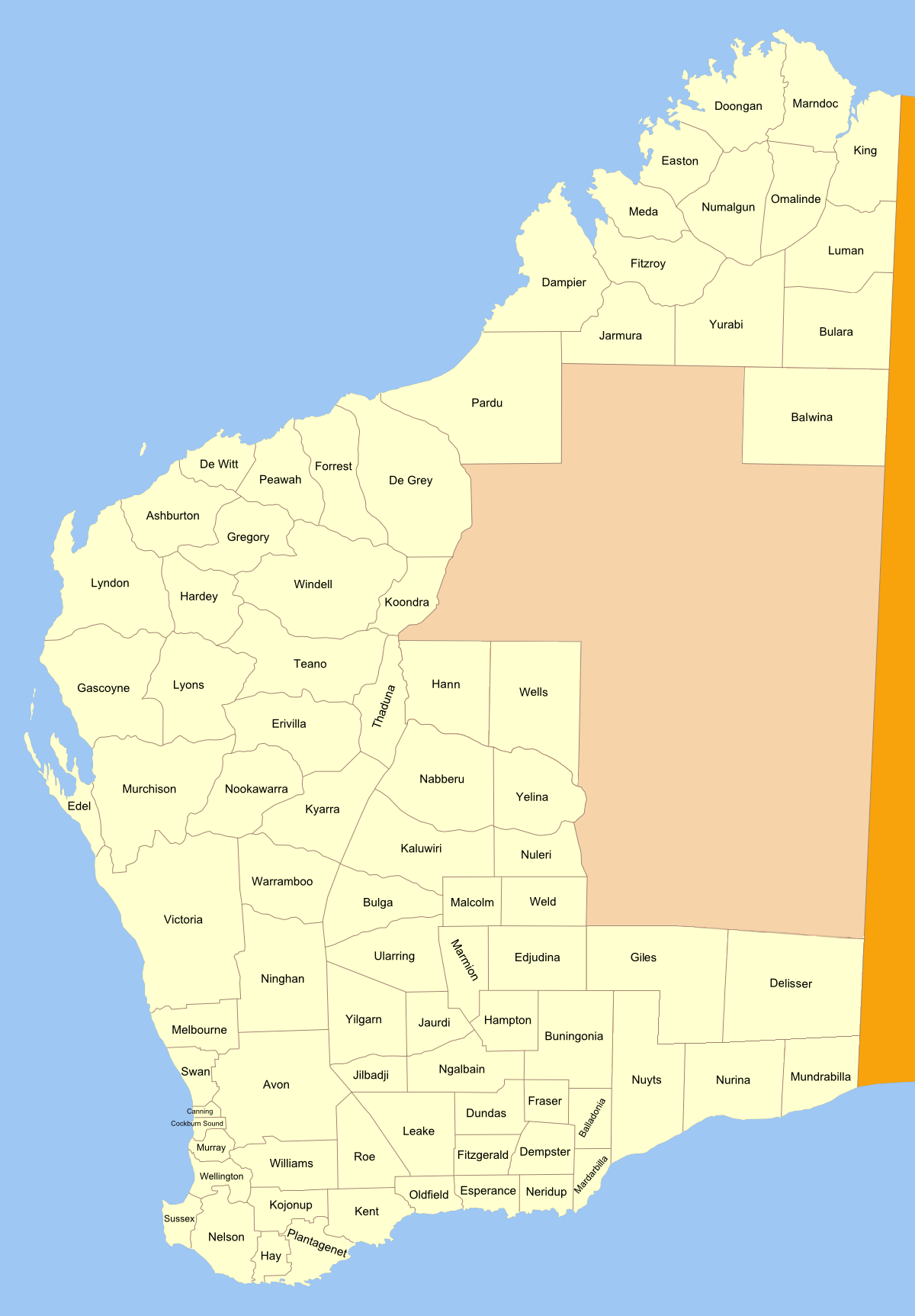
Lands administrative divisions around Delisser:
Yowalga	Yowalga
Giles	Delisser	South Australia
Nurina	Mundrabilla

Delisser Land District is a land district (cadastral division) of Western Australia, located within the Eastern and Eucla land divisions on the Nullarbor Plain. It spans roughly 29°00'S - 31°00'S in latitude and 126°30'E - 129°00'E in longitude. It was named after E.A. Delisser who surveyed and described the Nullarbor Plain in the 1860s.

The district was created on 20 October 1916 and was defined in the Government Gazette:

Bounded by lines starting from the 300 mile mark on the Trans-Australian Railway line, and extending Eastward along said line to the 129deg. East longitude, thence North to a point due East of survey mark R. 82 at Brickey's Soak, thence West to a point due North of the aforesaid 300-mile mark on the Railway line, and thence due South to the starting point.
