= Hann Land District =

Coordinates: 24°50′S 120°50′E

Hann Western Australia
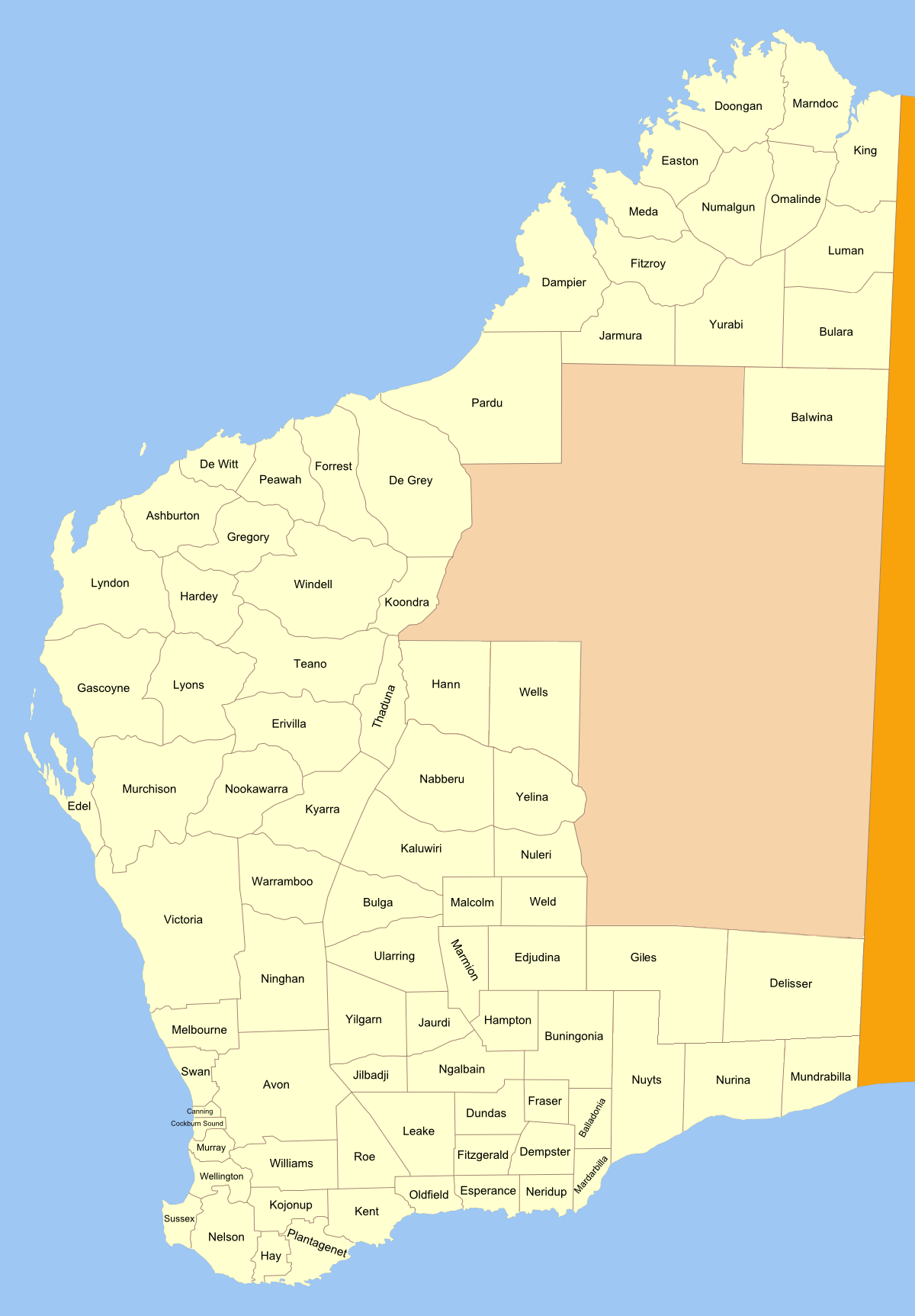
- Region: Mid West
Lands administrative divisions around Hann:
Koondra
Thadoona	Hann	Wells
Thadoona	Nabberu	Nabberu

Hann Land District is a land district (cadastral division) of Western Australia, located within the Eastern Land Division of the state. It spans roughly 24°00'S - 25°40'S in latitude and 120°00'E - 121°40'E in longitude, east of the rabbit-proof fence. Part of the Canning Stock Route passes through the south-east of the district. It is named in honour of explorer Frank Hann.

The district was created on 30 January 1925 and was defined in the Government Gazette:

Bounded by lines starting from the 547-mile post on the surveyed line of the No.1 Rabbit-proof Fence, and extending East to a point situate due North from survey mark F. 46 at the Weld Springs; thence South, passing through said survey mark to the centre of the Charles Wells Creek; thence Westerly, North-Westerly and Southerly partly along said creek and the centres of Lakes Teague and Nabberu to said surveyed line of the Rabbit-proof Fence, and thence in a general North-North-Easterly direction along said surveyed line to the starting point.
