= Wells Land District =

Coordinates: 25°15′S 122°30′E

Wells Western Australia
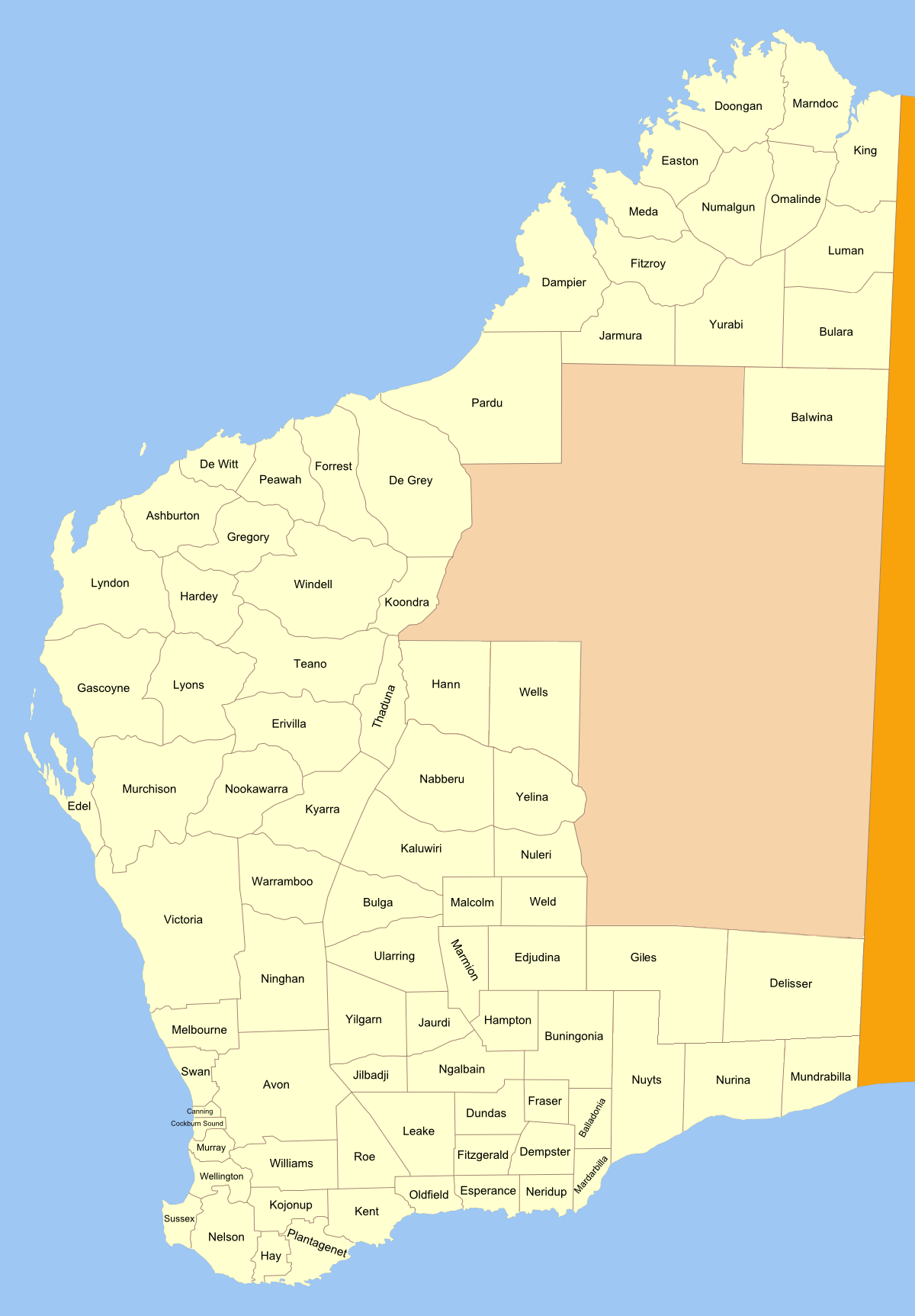
- Region: Mid West
Lands administrative divisions around Wells:
		Wanman
Hann	Wells	Tugaila
Nabberu	Yelina	Tugaila

Wells Land District is a land district (cadastral division) of Western Australia, located within the Eastern Land Division of the state. It spans roughly 24°00'S - 26°20'S in latitude and 121°40'E - 123°20'E in longitude. Its name honours Lawrence Allen Wells, an explorer of the area in 1896–1897.

It lies to the north of Lake Carnegie, and part of the Canning Stock Route passes through the north-west of the district.

The district was created on 30 January 1925 and was defined in the Government Gazette:

Bounded by lines starting due East from the 547-mile post on the surveyed line of the No.1 Rabbit-proof Fence and due North from survey mark F. 46 at the Weld Springs, and extending East to a point due North from the summit of Kyffin Thomas Hill; thence South to the centre of Lake Wells; thence North-Westerly and Westerly along the centre of the said lake and the centres of Lakes Dorothena, Carnegie and Rudall, and the centre of the Charles Wells Creek to a point due South from the starting point, and hence due North to the said starting point.
