= Yowalga Land District =

Coordinates: 27°55′S 127°25′E

Yowalga Western Australia
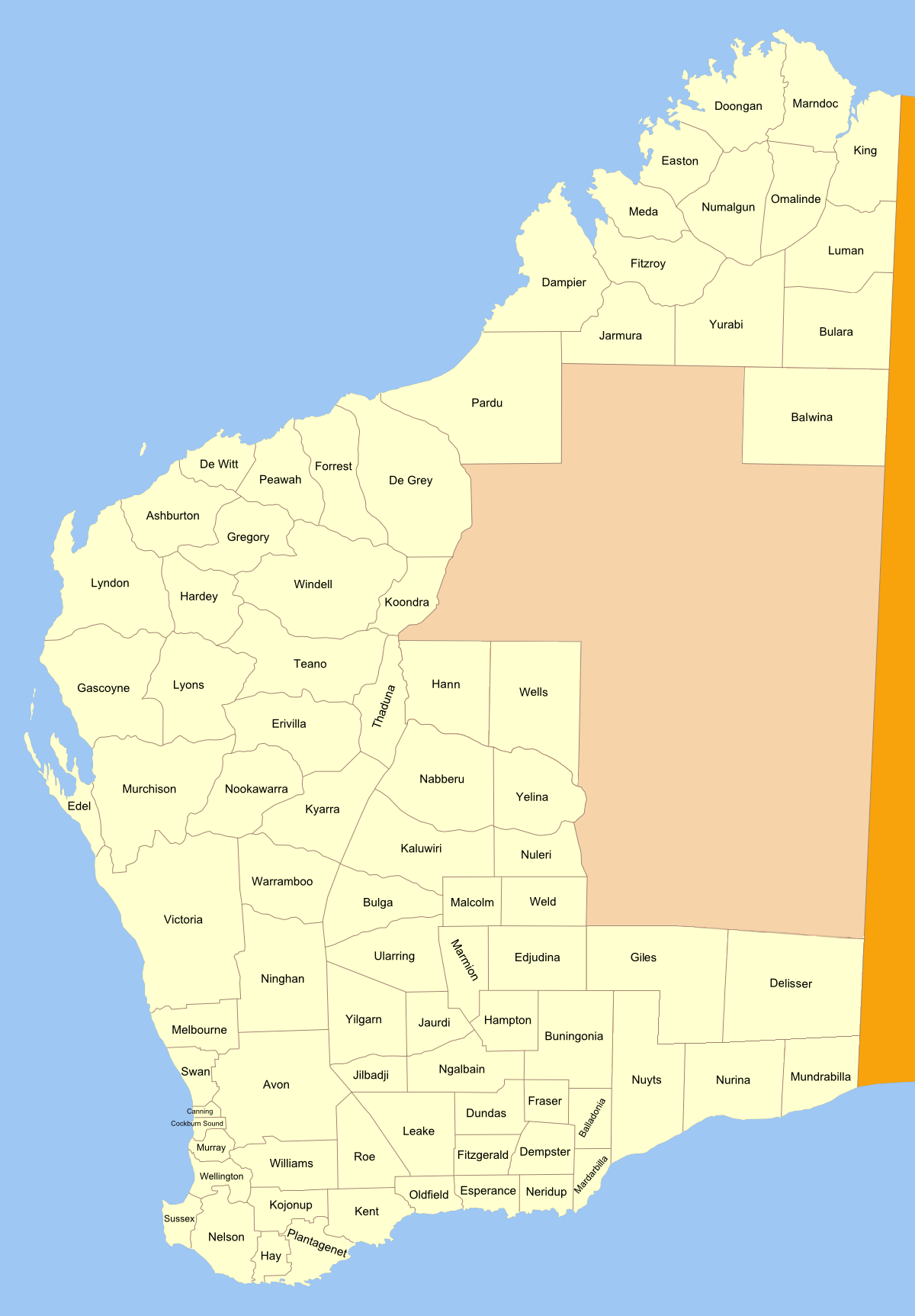
Lands administrative divisions around Yowalga:
Tugaila	Milyuga	South Australia
Yamarna	Yowalga	South Australia
Giles	Delisser	South Australia

Yowalga Land District is a land district (cadastral division) of Western Australia, located within the Eastern Land Division in the Great Victoria Desert, north of the Nullarbor Plain. It spans roughly 26°50'S - 29°00'S in latitude and 125°00'E - 129°00'E in longitude.

== History ==
The district was created on 3 February 1932, and was defined in the Government Gazette:

Bounded by lines starting from a point on the 125deg. meridian of longitude East situate East from Survey Mark B. 82 at Brickey Soak, and extending due North to a point situate East from the summit of Kyffin Thomas Hill; thence due East to the East boundary of the State; thence due South, passing along said boundary to a point situate East from the starting point, and thence due West to said starting point.
