= Milyuga Land District =

Coordinates: 25°25′S 127°25′E

Milyuga Western Australia
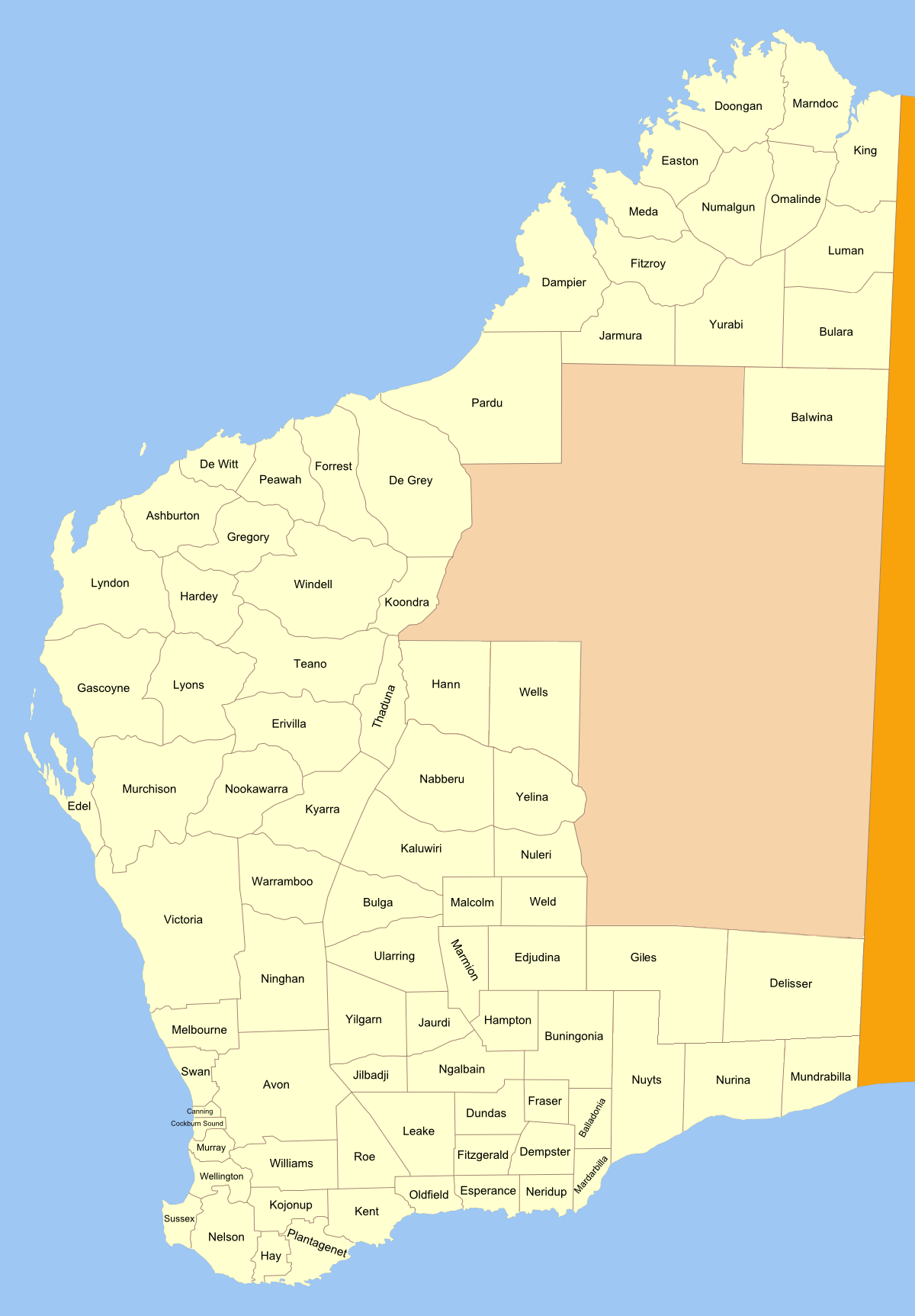
Lands administrative divisions around Milyuga:
		Northern Territory
Tugaila	Milyuga	Northern Territory
Yowalga	Yowalga	South Australia

Milyuga Land District is a land district (cadastral division) of Western Australia, located within the Eastern Land Division in the Gibson Desert. It spans roughly 24°00'S - 26°50'S in latitude and 125°50'E - 129°00'E in longitude, and includes the town of Warburton and the Giles Weather Station.

== History ==
The district was created on 3 February 1932, and was defined in the Government Gazette:

Bounded by lines starting from a point situate East from the summit of Kyffin Thomas Hill and South from Survey Mark P.B. 197 at Gahnda Rock Hole, and extending due North, passing through said Survey Mark to a point situate East from the 547-mile Post on the No. 1 Rabbit-Proof Fence; thence due East to the East boundary of the State; thence due South, passing along said boundary to a point situate East from the starting point, and thence due West to the said starting point.
