= Central Land Division =

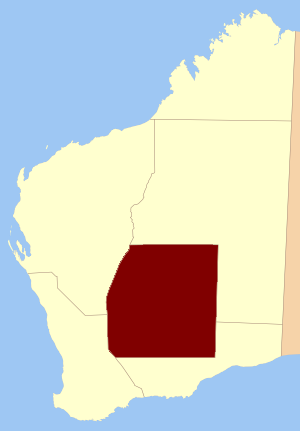
Location in Western Australia

Central Land Division was a land division of Western Australia defined under section 26 of the Land Act Amendment Act 1906, and existed from 1 February 1907 until 28 March 1917, when it became part of the Eastern Land Division under section 4 of the Land Act Amendment Act 1917. It was bounded by the Rabbit-proof fence in the west, and included Kalgoorlie. It comprised parts of the eastern Wheatbelt and the Goldfields-Esperance region.

It was defined thus in the 1906 Act:

Bounded by lines starting from the No. 1 line of the rabbit-proof fence at latitude 26° South, and extending Southerly along the said fence to a point situate West from the summit of the granite rock near the 50-Mile Soak on the Dundas-Lake Lefroy Road; thence East to the 125th meridian of East longitude; thence North to the parallel of 26° South latitude aforesaid, and thence West to the starting point.
