= Neridup Land District =

Coordinates: 33°40′S 122°55′E

Neridup Western Australia
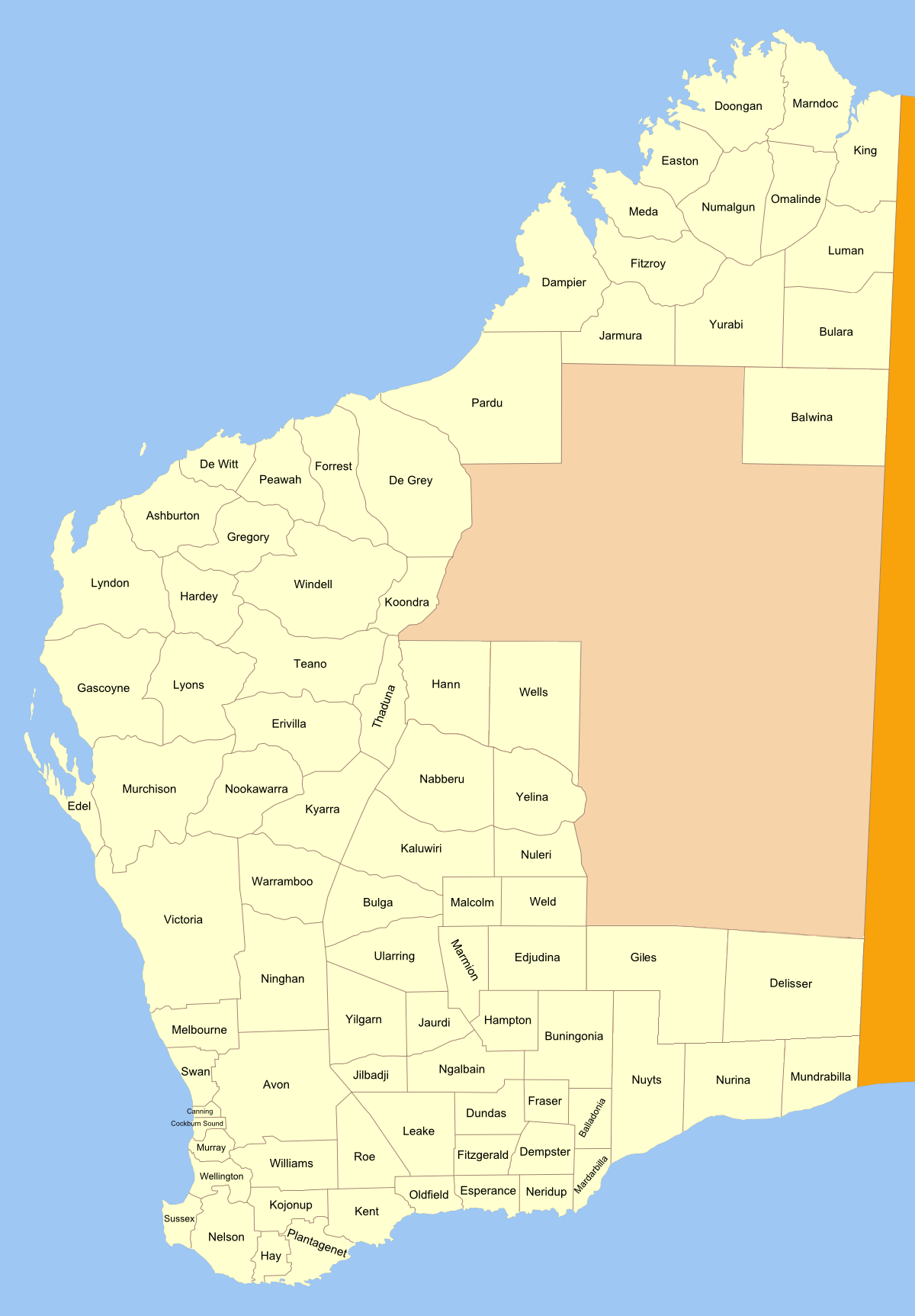
Lands administrative divisions around Neridup:
Dempster	Dempster	Mardarbilla
Esperance	Neridup	Mardarbilla
Southern Ocean	Southern Ocean	Southern Ocean

Neridup Land District is a land district (cadastral division) of Western Australia, located within the Eucla Land Division on the state's south coast. It spans roughly 33°15'S – 34°00'S in latitude and 122°20'E – 123°30'E in longitude.

== Location and features ==
The district is located on the Southern Ocean coast east of Esperance, extending west to Rossiter Bay, east to Sandy Bight (including most of Cape Arid National Park) and north about 65 kilometres (40 mi) inland. It includes the townsites of Condingup (1963) and Wharton (1964).

== History ==
On 20 August 1896, Harry Johnston, the Deputy Surveyor General of Western Australia, recommended that four new districts be created in the Esperance region, suggesting the name "Cheyne" for Neridup. The Minister approved the names on 11 September, and on 23 September 1896 they were added to the Standard Plans in use by the Department of Lands and Surveys. As it was approved prior to the Land Act 1898, its boundaries were never gazetted.
