= Mundrabilla Land District =

Coordinates: 31°30′S 128°15′E

Mundrabilla Western Australia
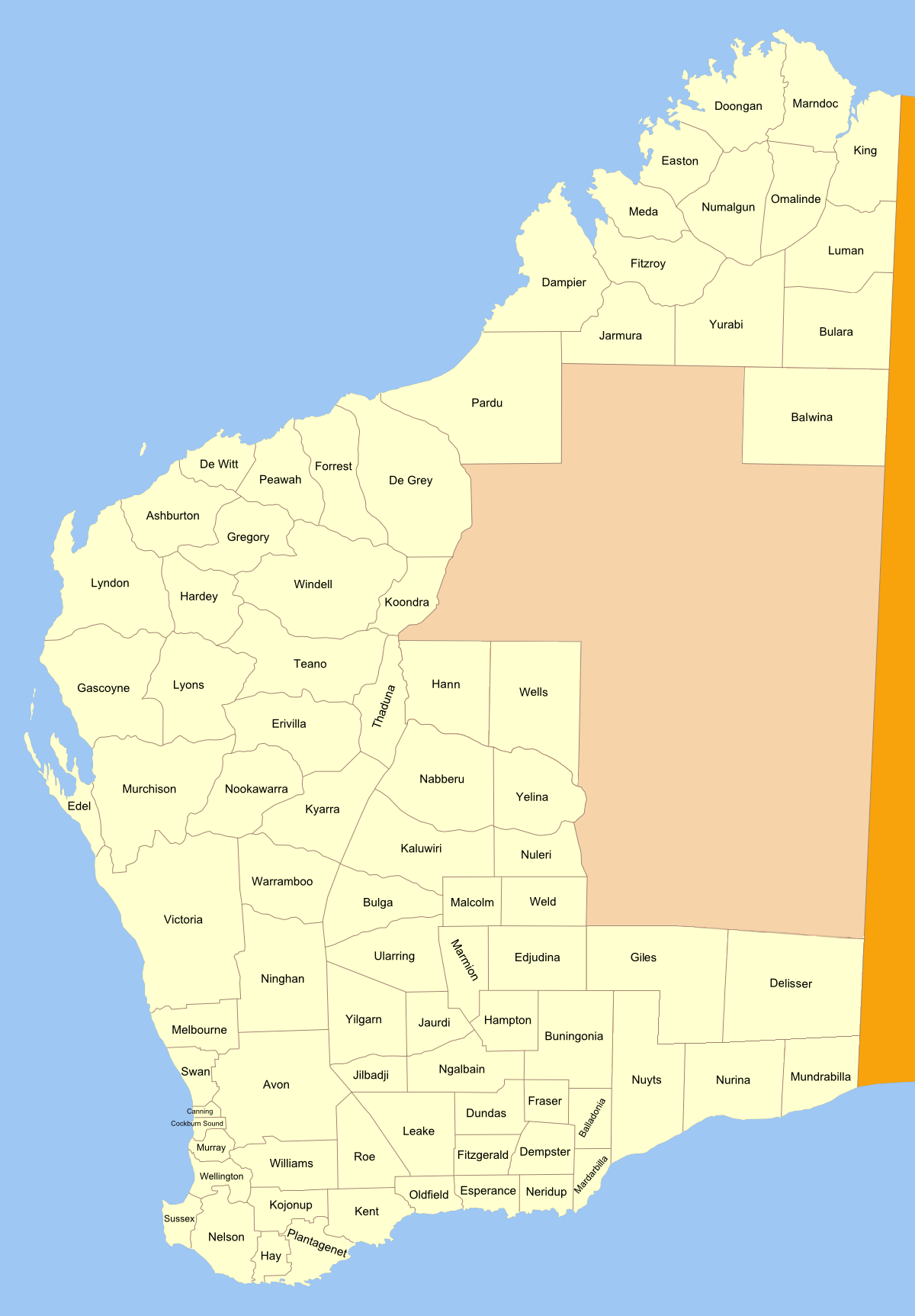
Lands administrative divisions around Mundrabilla:
Delisser	Delisser	South Australia
Nurina	Mundrabilla	South Australia
Nurina	Great Australian Bight	Great Australian Bight

Mundrabilla Land District is a land district (cadastral division) of Western Australia, located within the Eucla Land Division on the Nullarbor Plain. It spans roughly 31°00'S - 32°00'S in latitude and 127°30'E - 129°00'E in longitude.

== Location and features ==
The district is located on the Nullarbor Plain on the Western Australia–South Australia border, and falls generally between the Great Australian Bight to the south and the Trans-Australian Railway to the north. The town of Eucla on the Eyre Highway and the railway town of Forrest are located within its boundaries.

== History ==
The district was created on 4 March 1903. When the Trans-Australian Railway was being built in 1914, the district was adjusted such that the railway formed its northern boundary. It was hence defined in the Government Gazette:

Bounded on the North by the centre of the Trans-Australian Railway Line; on the East by the East boundary of the State; on the West by a North line from Red Rock Point through Survey Mark E11; and on the South by the sea coast.
