= Balladonia Land District =

Coordinates: 32°15′S 123°35′E

Balladonia Western Australia
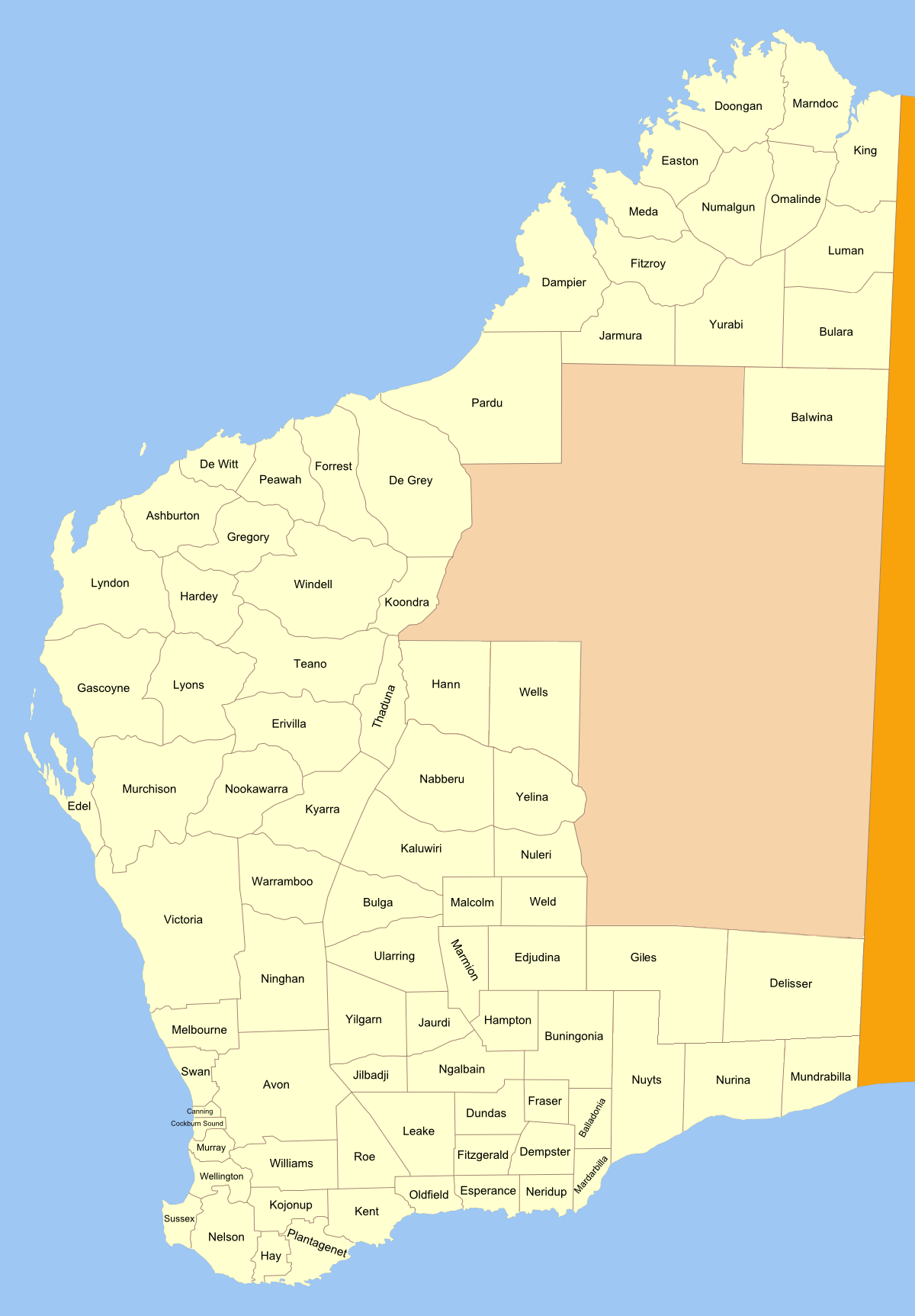
Lands administrative divisions around Balladonia:
Ngalbain	Buningonia	Nuyts
Fraser	Balladonia	Nuyts
Dempster	Mardarbilla	Nuyts

Balladonia Land District is a land district (cadastral division) of Western Australia mostly within the Eucla Land Division. It spans roughly 31°50'S - 32°40'S in latitude and 123°10'E - 124°00'E in longitude.

== Location and features ==
The district is located on the Nullarbor Plain and contains the town of Balladonia. The Eyre Highway runs through the district.

== History ==
The district was approved on 3 September 1897 by the Commissioner of Crown Lands. As it was approved prior to the Land Act 1898, its boundaries were never gazetted.
