= Balwina Land District =

Coordinates: 20°15′S 127°42′E

Balwina Western Australia
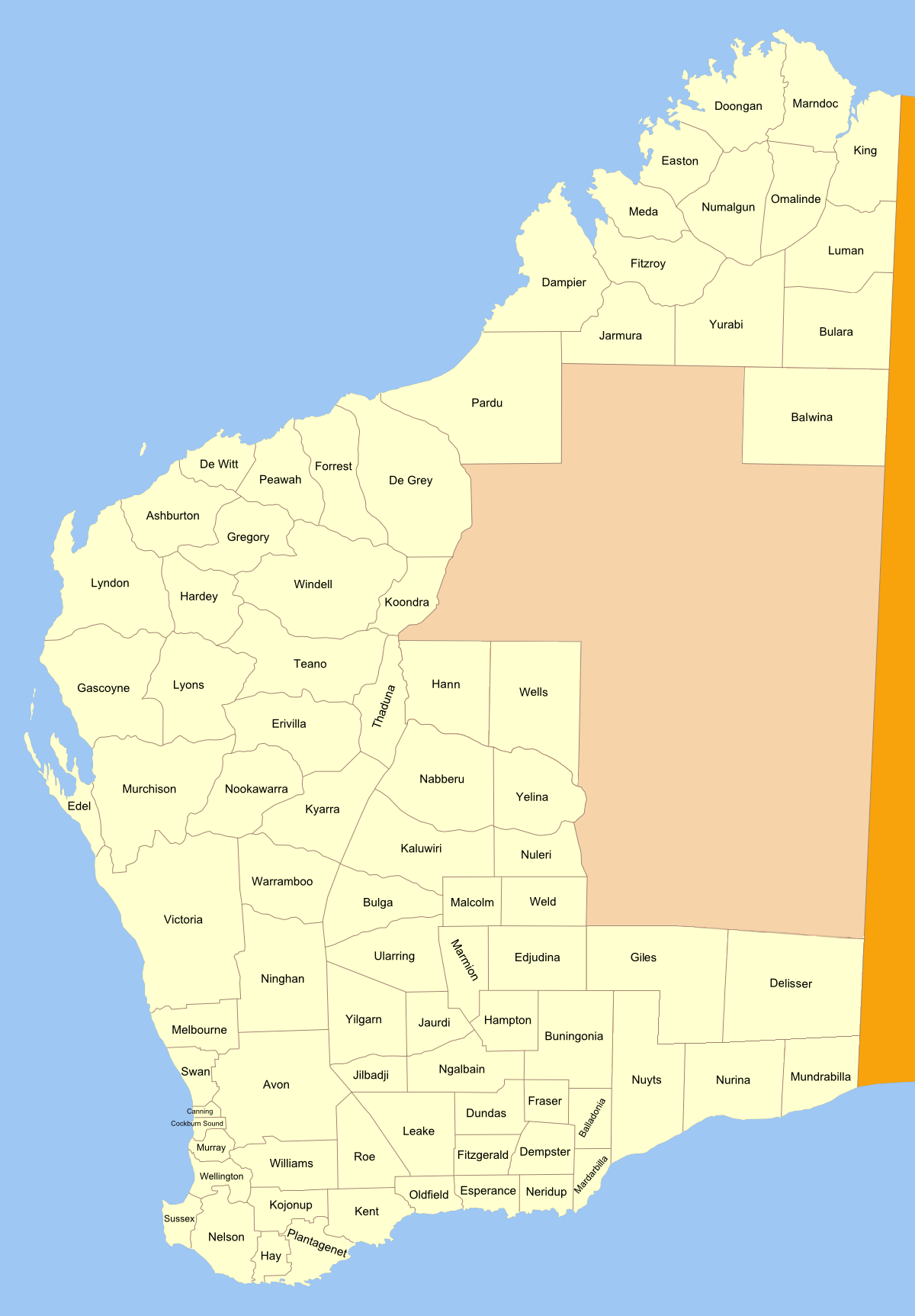
- Location in Western Australia
Lands administrative divisions around Balwina:
Yurabi	Bulara	Northern Territory
	Balwina	Northern Territory
		Northern Territory

Balwina Land District is a land district (cadastral division) of Western Australia, located within the Eastern Land Division in the Great Sandy Desert. It spans roughly 19°30'S - 21°00'S in latitude and 126°25'E - 129°00'E in longitude.

The district includes part of the Shire of Halls Creek in the Kimberley region — most particularly the community of Balgo — as well as the easternmost part of the Shire of East Pilbara in the Pilbara region of the state.

== History ==
The district was created on 13 April 1928, and was defined in the Government Gazette:

Bounded by lines starting from a point situate South 60 miles from the summit of Mt. Cornish and extending North passing through said summit to the latitude of 19deg. 30 min. South; thence East to the East boundary of the State; thence South to a point due East of the starting point, and thence West to the said starting point.

Landgate's GEONOMA database records that the name was suggested by Assistant Chief Draftsman, G. W. Paris, who stated it was an Aboriginal word meaning "waterhole". The database also notes that on 23 January 1987, the district was extended west to 126°E longitude; however, this was not gazetted.
