= Thadoona Land District =

Coordinates: 25°25′S 119°40′E

Thadoona Western Australia
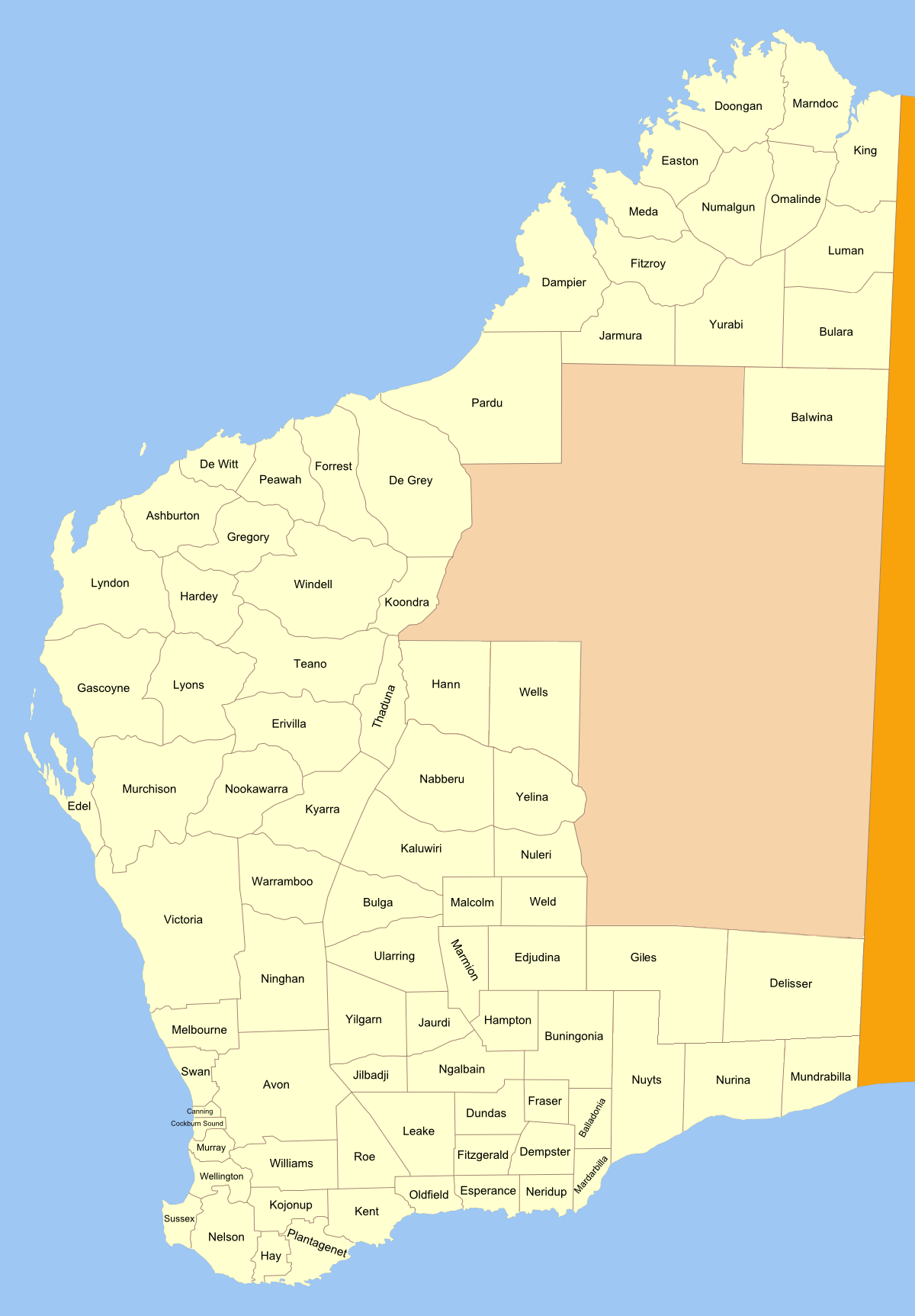
Lands administrative divisions around Thadoona:
Teano	Koondra
Teano	Thadoona	Hann
Erivilla	Kyarra	Nabberu

Thadoona Land District is a land district (cadastral division) of Western Australia and a subdivision of the North-West Land Division located in the Mid West region of the state.

== Location and features ==
The district falls roughly east of the Great Northern Highway, extending to the rabbit-proof fence, about halfway between the towns of Newman and Meekatharra.

== History ==
The name and boundaries of the district were first proposed on 24 July 1902 by the chief draftsman, with the spelling "Thadoona". It was later altered to Thaduna, and gazetted accordingly on 4 March 1903. It was later adjusted to make the rabbit-proof fence the eastern boundary of the district. On 17 June 1960, its spelling was changed to "Thadoona" to better conform with the correct Aboriginal pronunciation of the name.
