= Tugaila Land District =

Coordinates: 25°25′S 124°35′E

Tugaila Western Australia
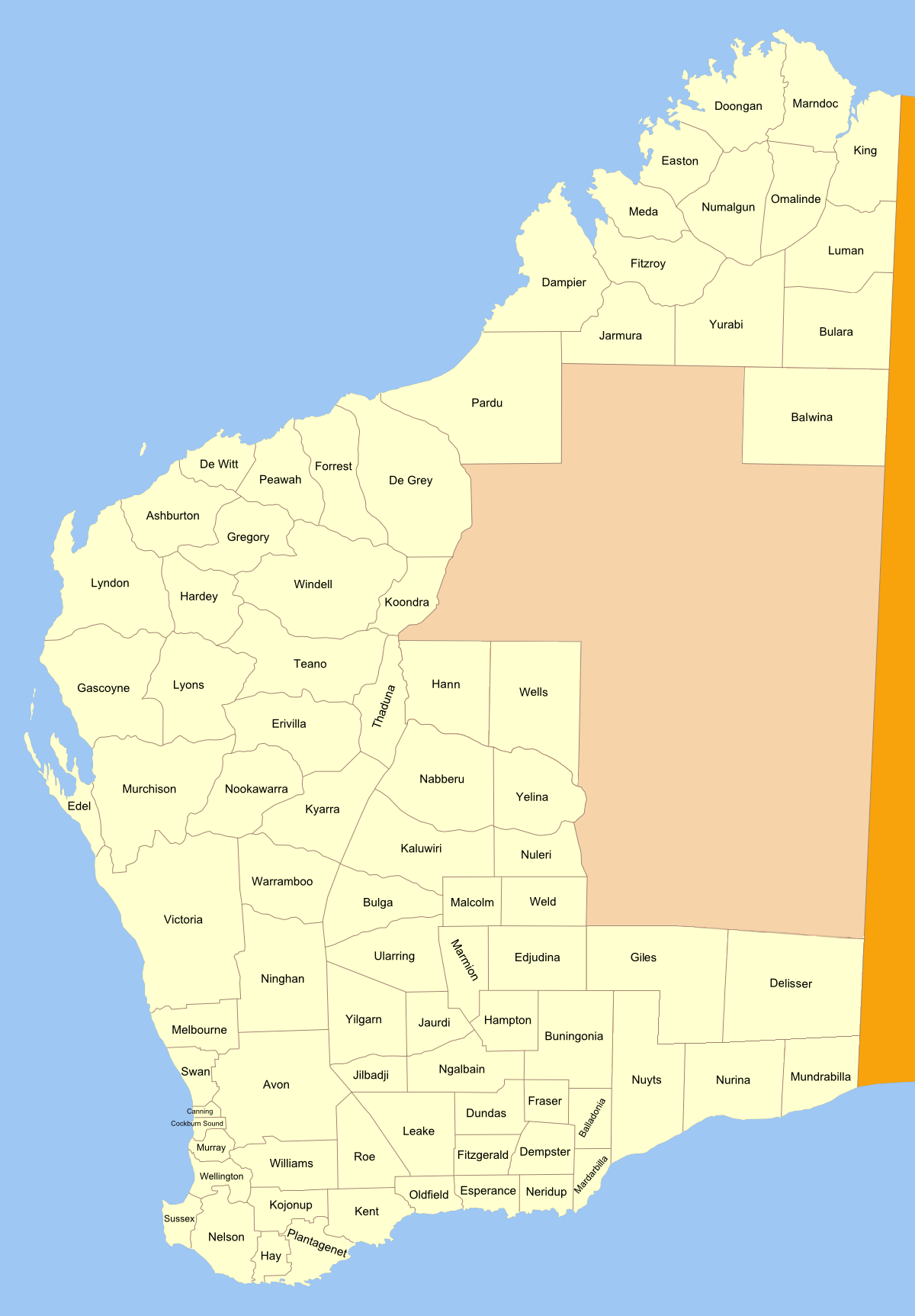
Lands administrative divisions around Tugaila:
Wanman
Wells	Tugaila	Milyuga
Yelina	Yamarna	Yowalga

Tugaila Land District is a land district (cadastral division) of Western Australia, located within the Eastern Land Division in the Gibson Desert. It spans roughly 24°00'S - 26°50'S in latitude and 123°20'E - 125°50'E in longitude.

== History ==
The district was created on 3 February 1932, and was defined in the Government Gazette:

Bounded by lines starting from the summit of Kyffin Thomas Hill and extending due North to a point situate East from the 547-mile Post on the No. 1 Rabbit-Proof Fence; thence due East to a point situate North from Survey Mark P.B. 197 at Gahnda Rock Hole; thence due South passing through said Survey Mark to a point situate East from the starting point, and thence due West to said starting point.
