= Edjudina =

Pastoral lease in Western Australia

Coordinates: 29.814°S 122.354°E

Location in Western Australia

Edjudina Station is a pastoral lease within the Edjudina Land District of Western Australia, that operates as a sheep station. The station is approximately 130 kilometres (80 mi) to the south of Laverton and 240 kilometres (150 mi) north east of Kalgoorlie in the Goldfields-Esperance region. The leasehold shares a boundary with Yundamindera Station.

Edjudina Consolidated Gold Mines Ltd commenced operations in 1937, but closed down shortly after due to declining market conditions for gold.

The traditional owners of the area are the Wongatha and Maduwongga peoples.

The lease was established in 1892 by Watt Newland. It was one of the first pastoral leases in the goldfields; the property was stocked with sheep. Newland sold Edjudina in 1921, at which time it occupied an area of 700,000 acres (283,280 ha). It was acquired by the Wilkie brothers at a "highly satisfactory price". The Wilkies later sold to James Withnell for £21,000. The property was then acquired by the famed sheep breeder, Edward Hawker, in 1925. Hawker paid £49,000, a record price in the east Murchison. The property was stocked with 7,000 sheep and 1,200 cattle at the time.

By 1934 the station was stocked with about 25,000 sheep and was still owned by E. W. Hawker and sons. In 1948 the station was stocked with 12,500 sheep.

The owner in 1952 was J. Maund; the property had an area of about 800,000 acres (320,000 ha) and was stocked with a flock of about 16,000 sheep.

In 2012 the property received 75 millimetres (3 in) of rain in 24 hours, its highest rainfall in 11 years, when the remnants of Cyclone Lua passed over the area.

== See also ==
- List of ranches and stations
- List of pastoral leases in Western Australia
