= Norseman Road District =

Former local government area in Western Australia

The Norseman Road District was an early form of local government area on the Western Australian goldfields.

It was established on 25 January 1918 with the amalgamation of the original Dundas Road District (1895) and the Municipality of Norseman. The Dundas board reluctantly agreed to the merger, having opposed it for some years, with their small revenue compared to the municipality, pressure from the state Public Works Department and the promise of an increased subsidy proving decisive. These tensions carried through into the new council, with the final meeting of the Dundas board resolving to contest the inaugural election as a body in opposition to the adoption of a ward system for the new district, claiming that it "nullified the benefits to be derived from amalgamation".

It ceased to exist on 21 June 1929, when it was abolished and replaced by the second Dundas Road District (later to become the Shire of Dundas).
