= Buningonia Land District =

Coordinates: 31°05′S 123°05′E

Buningonia Western Australia
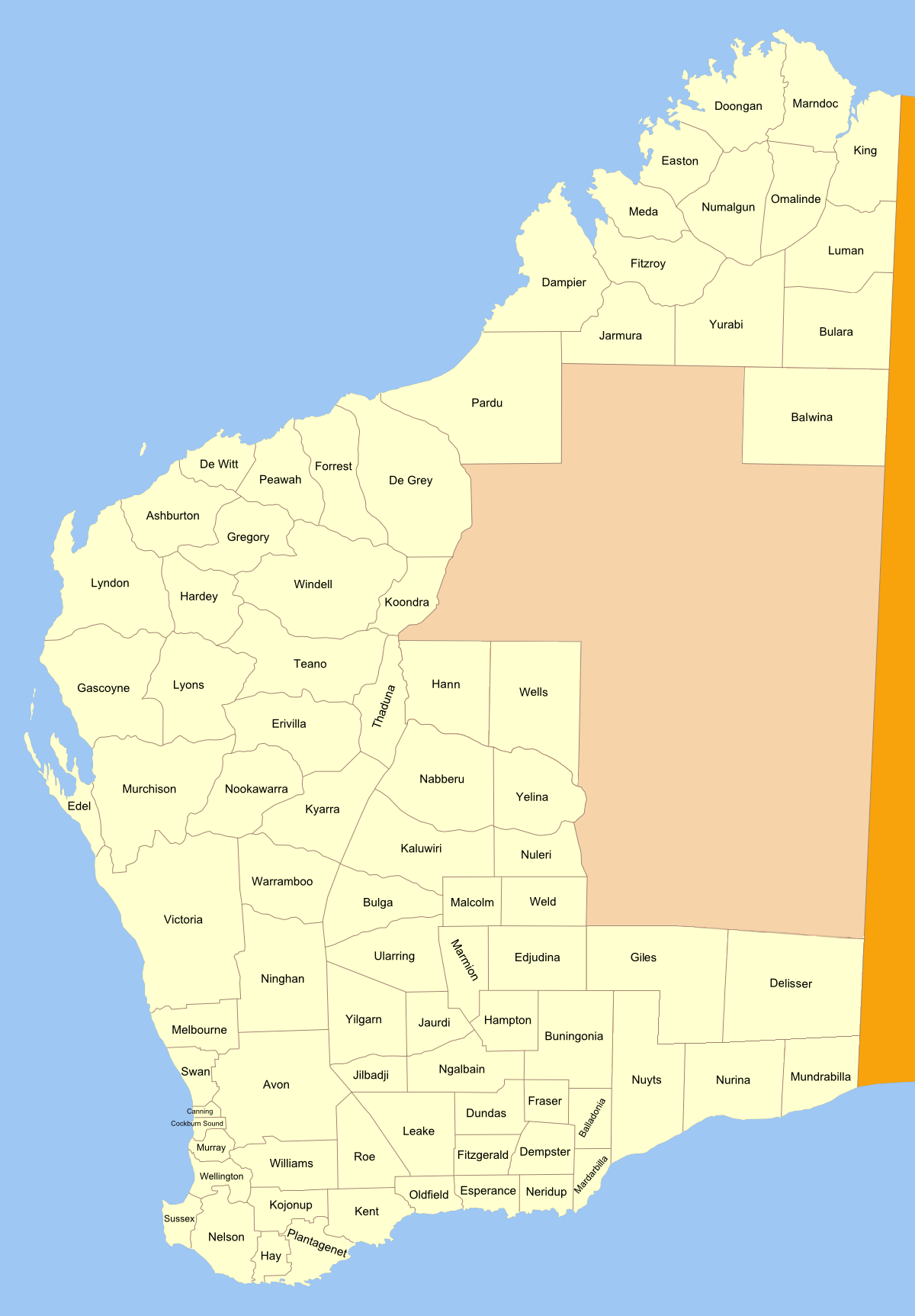
Lands administrative divisions around Buningonia:
Hampton	Edjudina	Giles
Ngalbain	Buningonia	Giles; Nuyts
Fraser	Balladonia	Nuyts

Buningonia Land District is a land district (cadastral division) of Western Australia, located within the Eastern Land Division on the Nullarbor Plain. It spans roughly 30°10'S - 32°00'S in latitude and 122°15'E - 124°00'E in longitude.

== Location and features ==
The district is located on the Nullarbor Plain in the south-east of the state and falls generally East of the city of Kalgoorlie. The Trans-Australian Railway roughly bisects the district. The Aboriginal settlement of Cundeelee and the railway towns of Coonana and Zanthus are located within its boundaries.

== History ==
The district was created on 4 March 1903. The description of the boundaries was subsequently amended on 8 May 1907, and published in the Government Gazette thus:

Bounded by lines starting from a point situate 20 miles East from the summit of Simon Hill and extending East to a point situate North from a point 20 miles East from the South East corner of East Location 12; thence North to a point situate East from Survey Mark R3; thence West to a point situate North from the North-East corner of Location 32; thence South to a point situate East from the South-West corner of Location 48; thence West to a point situate South from Trig. Station M5; thence South to a point situate West from a point 10 miles North from the summit of Simon Hill; thence East to a point situate North from the starting point; and thence South to the starting point.
