= Weld Land District =

Coordinates: 28°39′55″S 122°25′05″E

Weld Western Australia
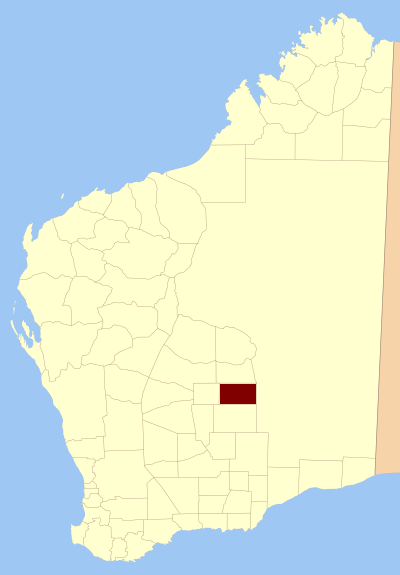
- Location in Western Australia
Lands administrative divisions around Weld:
Kaluwiri	Nuleri
Malcolm	Weld
Marmion	Edjudina

Weld Land District is one of the land districts of Western Australia, which is located within the Eastern Land Division in the north-eastern Goldfields region of the state.

== Location ==
Its main centre of population is the town of Laverton, and it also includes the former towns of Mount Morgans, Mount Margaret, Burtville and Yundamindera to the west and the Mount Weld mine site to the south. It spans roughly 28°10'S - 29°00'S in latitude and 122°00'E - 123°30'E in longitude.

== History ==
The district was created on 25 November 1901 and was defined in the Government Gazette:

Bounded by lines starting from a point situate 2 miles 10 chains West from Survey mark B82 at Brickey's Soak, and extending North to a point situate West from SUrvey mark HR (conjoined) 23; thence East to a point situate North from the summit of Mt Luck; thence South to a point situate East from the starting point; and thence West to the starting point.
