= Dundas, Western Australia =

Abandoned town in Western Australia

Dundas
- Town
- Interactive map of Dundas
- Coordinates: 32°23′00″S 121°46′00″E
- Country: Australia
- State: Western Australia
- LGA: Shire of Dundas
- Location: 22 km (14 mi) south of Norseman; 180 km (110 mi) north of Esperance
- Established: 1895

Government
  - State electorate: Kalgoorlie
  - Federal division: O'Connor

Area
  - Total: 983.4 km^{2} (379.7 sq mi)

Population
  - Total: 0 (SAL 2016)
- Postcode: 6443

Dundas is an abandoned town in the Goldfields-Esperance Region of Western Australia. The town is located about 22 kilometres (14 mi) south of Norseman.

The town was established during the late 19th century gold rush period.

Dundas was the location of an early gold find in the region in 1894. The town was gazetted on 22 May 1895 and derives its name from the Dundas Hills which, in turn, were named after Captain James Whitley Deans Dundas of the Royal Navy ship HMS Tagus in 1848.

The population of the town was 99 (71 males and 28 females) in 1898.

Further gold finds north of Dundas led to the establishment of Norseman, which, having the richer find, rapidly outgrew the former.

== See also ==
- Shire of Dundas
- Dundas Land District
