= Shire of Dundas =

Coordinates: 32°11′46″S 121°46′41″E

- Local government area
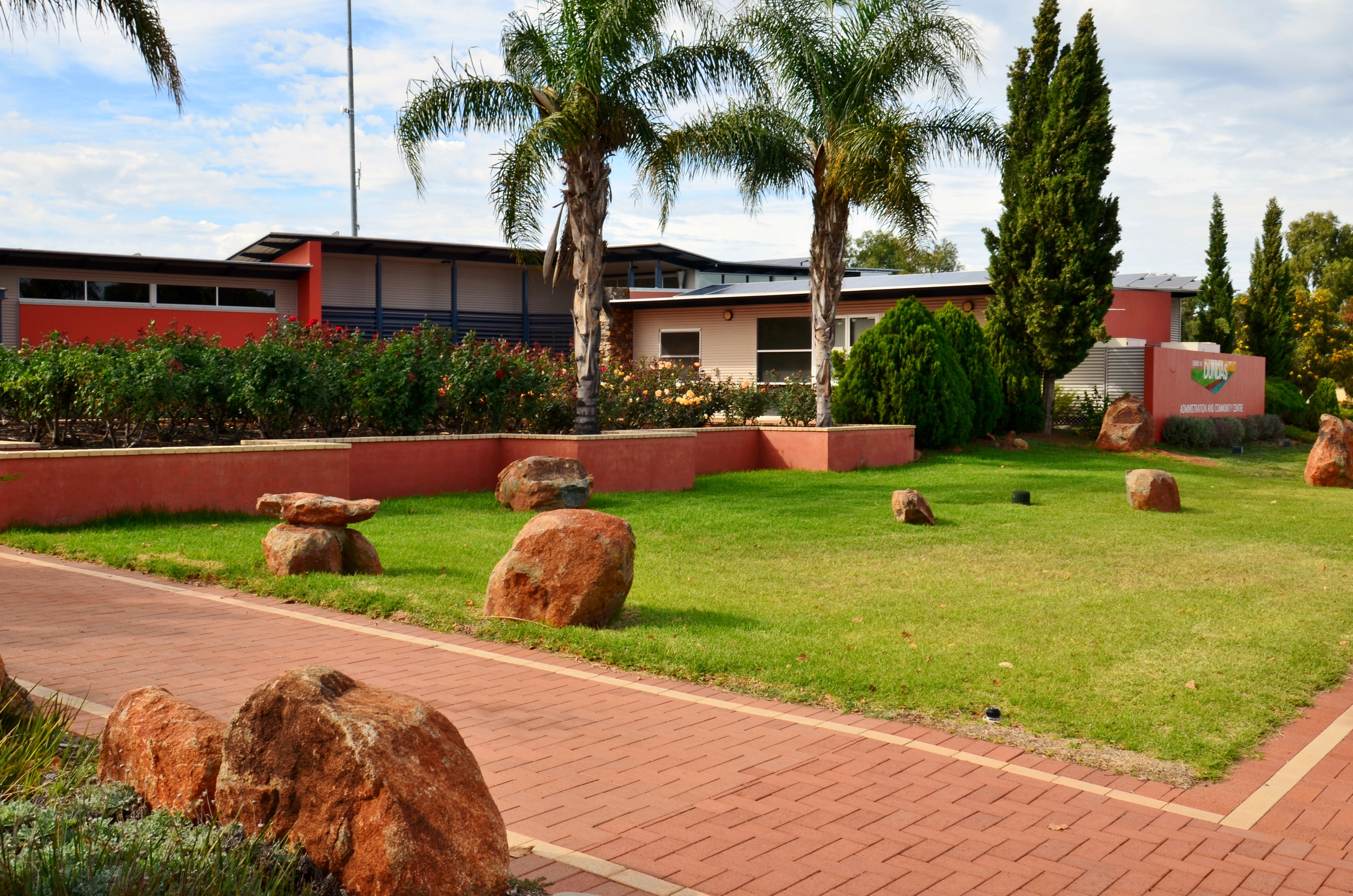
- The Dundas Shire Office

- Interactive map of Shire of Dundas
- Country: Australia
- State: Western Australia
- Region: Goldfields-Esperance
- Established: 1895
- Council seat: Norseman

Government
  - Shire President: Laurene Bonza
  - State electorate: Kalgoorlie
  - Federal division: O'Connor

Area
  - Total: 93,179 km^{2} (35,977 sq mi)

Population
  - Total: 677 (LGA 2021)
- Website: Shire of Dundas
LGAs around Shire of Dundas
Coolgardie, Yilgarn	Kalgoorlie-Boulder	Maralinga (SA)
Kondinin	Shire of Dundas	Outback Areas (SA)
Ravensthorpe	Esperance	Great Australian Bight

The Shire of Dundas is a local government area in the Goldfields-Esperance region of Western Australia. The shire covers an area of 93,179 km^{2} (35,977 sq mi) and its seat of government is the town of Norseman. Its territory lies between Norseman and the border with South Australia (including much of the Eyre Highway), and is between 700 and 1,500 km (430 and 930 mi) east of the state capital, Perth.

== History ==
The shire was first established as the second Dundas Road District on 21 June 1929, when the Norseman Road District was abolished and replaced by a re-established Dundas board. (An earlier Dundas Road District had existed from 1895 to 1918 before amalgamating to form the Norseman district.)

It was declared a shire and named the Shire of Dundas with effect from 1 July 1961 following the passage of the Local Government Act 1960, which reformed all remaining road districts into shires.

== Towns and localities ==
The towns and localities of the Shire of Dundas with population and size figures based on the most recent Australian census:

Suburb	Population	Area	Map
Balladonia	0 (SAL 2021)	15,267.6 km^{2} (5,894.9 sq mi)	
Caiguna	4 (SAL 2021)	13,709.8 km^{2} (5,293.4 sq mi)	
Cocklebiddy	15 (SAL 2021)	8,765.2 km^{2} (3,384.3 sq mi)	
Dundas	0 (SAL 2016)	983.4 km^{2} (379.7 sq mi)	
Eucla	37 (SAL 2021)	4,995.1 km^{2} (1,928.6 sq mi)	
Fraser Range	50 (SAL 2021)	20,485.9 km^{2} (7,909.7 sq mi)	
Madura	0 (SAL 2021)	8,262.1 km^{2} (3,190.0 sq mi)	
Mundrabilla	11 (SAL 2021)	6,292 km^{2} (2,429 sq mi)	
Norseman	562 (SAL 2021)	14,278.3 km^{2} (5,512.9 sq mi)	

== Notable councillors ==
- Emil Nulsen, Dundas Roads Board chairman 1929–1931; later a state MP

== Heritage-listed places ==
As of 2023, 78 places are heritage-listed in the Shire of Dundas, of which seven are on the State Register of Heritage Places.

== See also ==
- Dundas, Western Australia
