= Norseman, Western Australia =

Norseman
- Town
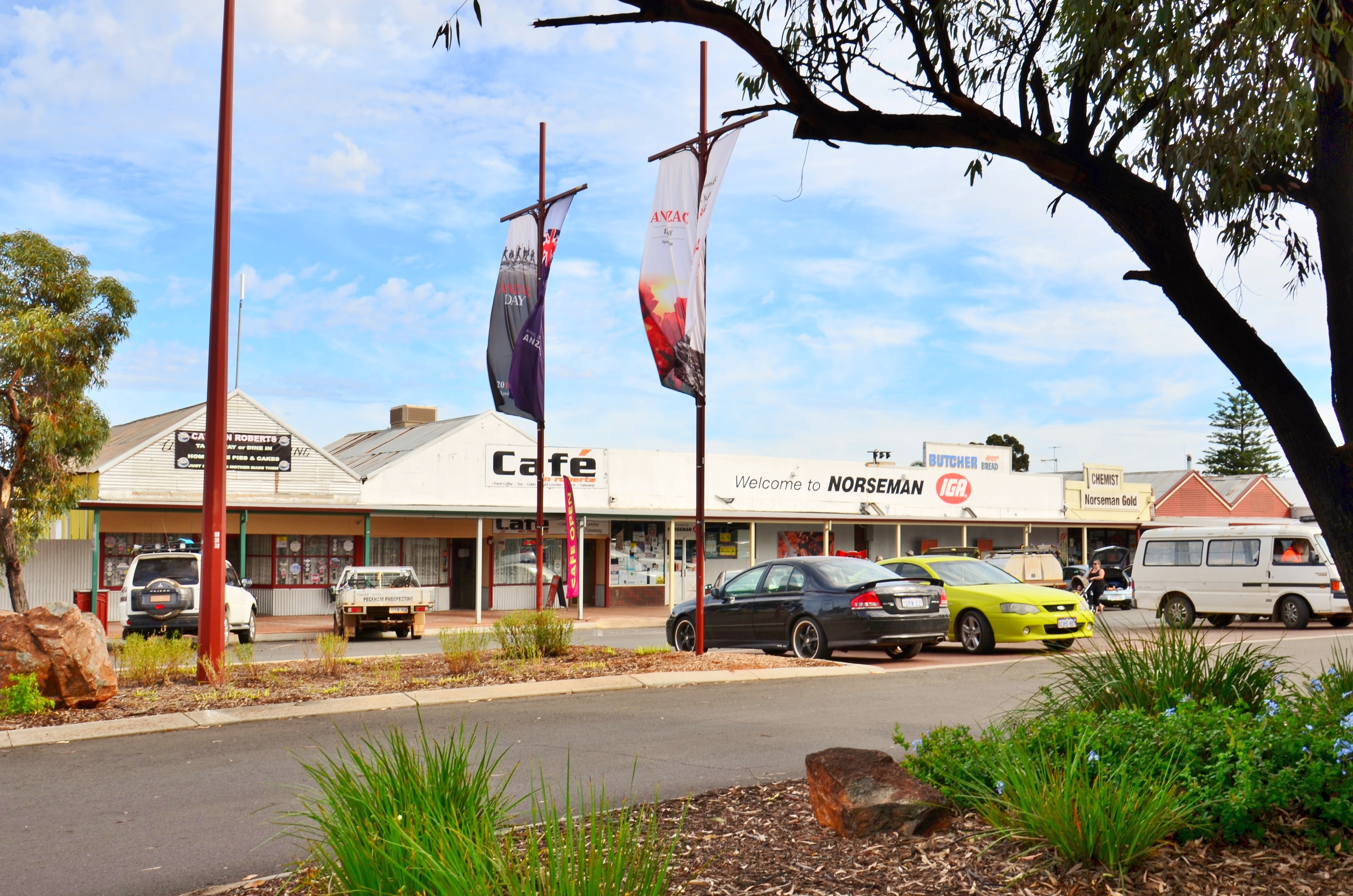
- Roberts Street, Norseman in 2017

- Interactive map of Norseman
- Coordinates: 32°11′46″S 121°46′41″E
- Country: Australia
- State: Western Australia
- LGA: Shire of Dundas
- Location: 726 km (451 mi) from Perth; 196 km (122 mi) from Kalgoorlie; 203 km (126 mi) from Esperance; 709 km (441 mi) from Eucla

Government
  - State electorate: Kalgoorlie
  - Federal division: O'Connor

Area
  - Total: 14,278.3 km^{2} (5,512.9 sq mi)
- Elevation: 283 m (928 ft)

Population
  - Total: 555 (UCL 2021)
- Postcode: 6443

Norseman is a town in the Goldfields-Esperance region of Western Australia along the Coolgardie-Esperance Highway, 726 kilometres (451 mi) east of Perth and 278 metres (912 ft) above sea level. It is also the starting point of the Eyre Highway, and the last major town in Western Australia before the South Australian border 720 kilometres (447 mi) to the east. At the 2021 census, Norseman had a population of 562, of whom 17% were Aboriginal.

== History ==
The quest for gold led to the establishment of Norseman, on the traditional land of the Ngadju. Today there are a number of small goldmining operations in the area but only the Central Norseman Gold Corporation can be considered a major producer. Gold was first found in the Norseman area in 1892, about 10 km south of the town, near Dundas. The Dundas Field was proclaimed in August 1893 and a townsite gazetted there.

In August 1894, Lawrence Sinclair, his brother George Sinclair, and Jack Alsopp discovered a rich gold reef. Sinclair named it after his horse, Hardy Norseman. The family had originally come from the Shetland Isles in December 1863. Laurie's brother James was working in Esperance as the post and telegraphist master.

In January 1895 the mining warden asked the government to declare a townsite for the 200 or so miners who had arrived. It was gazetted on 24 May. The Aboriginal name for the area is "Jimberlana". A mining entrepreneur from Melbourne, Ernest McCaughan, led a party of 13 by steamship from Melbourne to Esperance to walk inland and discover the central part of the gold field. He later went on to develop substantial mining interests in Western Australia and Tasmania.

Norseman initially struggled to develop because of the established town of Dundas but, between 1895 and 1901, a post office, banks, doctor, courthouse, stores and churches were established and, in 1899 Cobb & Co, mail coaches started delivering mail to Norseman. In 1935, Western Mining Corporation came to Norseman and invested significantly in its infrastructure, resulting in new bitumen roads, electricity and an extension of the Goldfields Water Supply Scheme to the town.

The population of the town was 418 (262 males and 156 females) in 1898.

Once it was the second-richest goldfield in Western Australia, next to the Golden Mile of Kalgoorlie. It is claimed that since 1892, over 100 tonnes of gold have been extracted from the area. The Norseman Gold Mine is Australia's longest continuously running gold mining operation. As of 2006, it had been in operation for more than 65 years, producing in excess of 5.5 million ounces of gold in that time.

== Present day ==
Modern Norseman is a small, sprawling town driven by mining, tourism and dominated by a huge tailings dump.

Norseman is located 724 km east of Perth via Great Eastern Highway and Coolgardie-Esperance Highway, and has a population of about 1,000. It contains a district high school (opened 1894), shopping facilities, accommodation (hotel, motel, caravan park), district hospital, council offices and a community resource centre are located within the town. Being at the start of the Eyre Highway, two fuel outlets are available.

== Geography ==
=== Climate ===
Norseman experiences a semi-arid climate (Köppen climate classification BSh).

Climate data for Norseman, Western Australia (1897–2010)
Month	Jan	Feb	Mar	Apr	May	Jun	Jul	Aug	Sep	Oct	Nov	Dec	Year
Record high °C (°F)	46.0 (114.8)	44.9 (112.8)	43.8 (110.8)	37.0 (98.6)	33.3 (91.9)	27.8 (82.0)	27.7 (81.9)	32.5 (90.5)	35.6 (96.1)	40.0 (104.0)	41.1 (106.0)	44.9 (112.8)	46.0 (114.8)
Mean daily maximum °C (°F)	32.5 (90.5)	31.3 (88.3)	28.8 (83.8)	24.5 (76.1)	20.4 (68.7)	17.4 (63.3)	16.8 (62.2)	18.4 (65.1)	21.6 (70.9)	24.9 (76.8)	28.0 (82.4)	30.7 (87.3)	24.6 (76.3)
Daily mean °C (°F)	24.2 (75.6)	23.6 (74.5)	21.7 (71.1)	18.1 (64.6)	14.5 (58.1)	11.9 (53.4)	11.0 (51.8)	11.9 (53.4)	14.5 (58.1)	17.3 (63.1)	20.1 (68.2)	22.4 (72.3)	17.6 (63.7)
Mean daily minimum °C (°F)	15.8 (60.4)	15.9 (60.6)	14.5 (58.1)	11.6 (52.9)	8.5 (47.3)	6.3 (43.3)	5.2 (41.4)	5.4 (41.7)	7.4 (45.3)	9.7 (49.5)	12.2 (54.0)	14.0 (57.2)	10.5 (50.9)
Record low °C (°F)	6.0 (42.8)	6.3 (43.3)	3.3 (37.9)	0.6 (33.1)	−2.3 (27.9)	−4.6 (23.7)	−3.1 (26.4)	−2.2 (28.0)	−3.0 (26.6)	−0.7 (30.7)	2.2 (36.0)	3.6 (38.5)	−4.6 (23.7)
Average precipitation mm (inches)	19.8 (0.78)	25.2 (0.99)	23.9 (0.94)	23.6 (0.93)	30.6 (1.20)	30.3 (1.19)	26.9 (1.06)	25.1 (0.99)	21.1 (0.83)	20.3 (0.80)	20.5 (0.81)	21.3 (0.84)	288.7 (11.37)
Source: Australian Bureau of Meteorology

== See also ==
- Nullarbor Plain
- Shire of Dundas
