= Edjudina Land District =

Coordinates: 29°25′S 122°35′E

Edjudina Western Australia
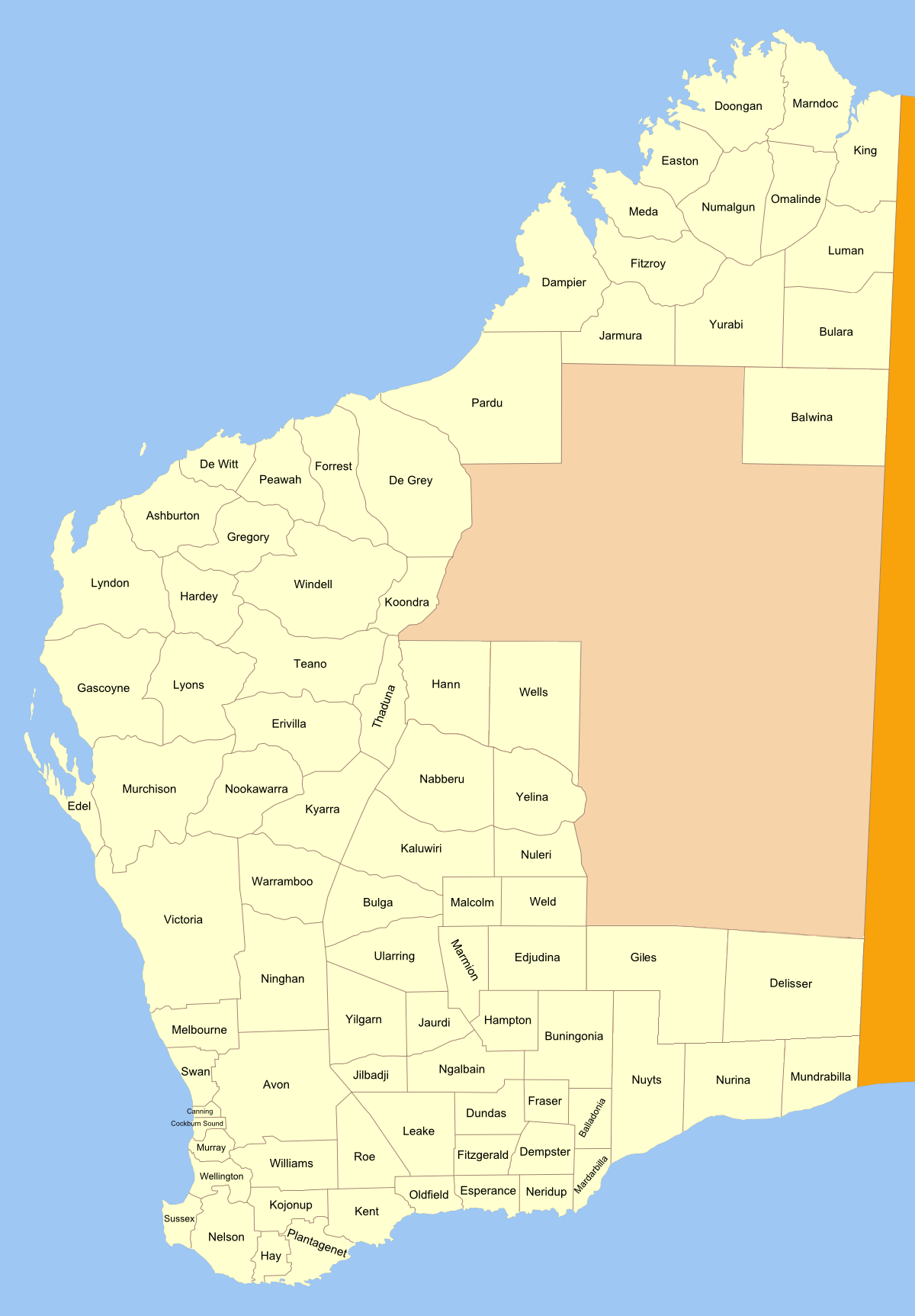

Edjudina Land District is a land district (cadastral division) of Western Australia, located within the Eastern Land Division.

The district began its modern economic history with the discovery of gold. Historic gold production of 33,215 oz @ 46.9 g/t of gold from this prospect was sourced from four major underground mines developed on these quartz lodes over a strike length of 1.4 kilometres between 1898 and 1939. Pastoral activities (sheep and cattle) were developed concurrently, and mining and exploration remains active in the region. Edjudina Station is a pastoral lease that operates as a sheep station in Western Australia approximately 80 miles N of Kalgoorlie, Western Australia. In 1969, the Edjudina Stony Meteorite was discovered on Edjudina Station.
