= Eucla Land Division =

Coordinates: 32°59′S 124°00′E

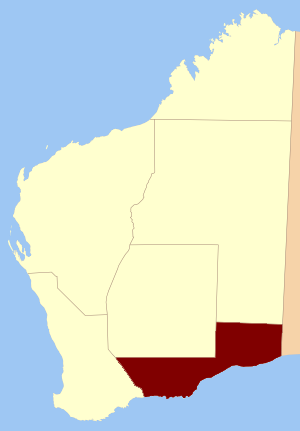
Location in Western Australia

Eucla Division is one of five Land Divisions of Western Australia, part of the Cadastral divisions of Western Australia. It includes Eucla and Esperance and part of the Nullarbor Plain. It is located in the southern parts of the Goldfields-Esperance region.
