= Oldfield Land District =

Coordinates: 33°40′S 120°25′E

Oldfield Western Australia
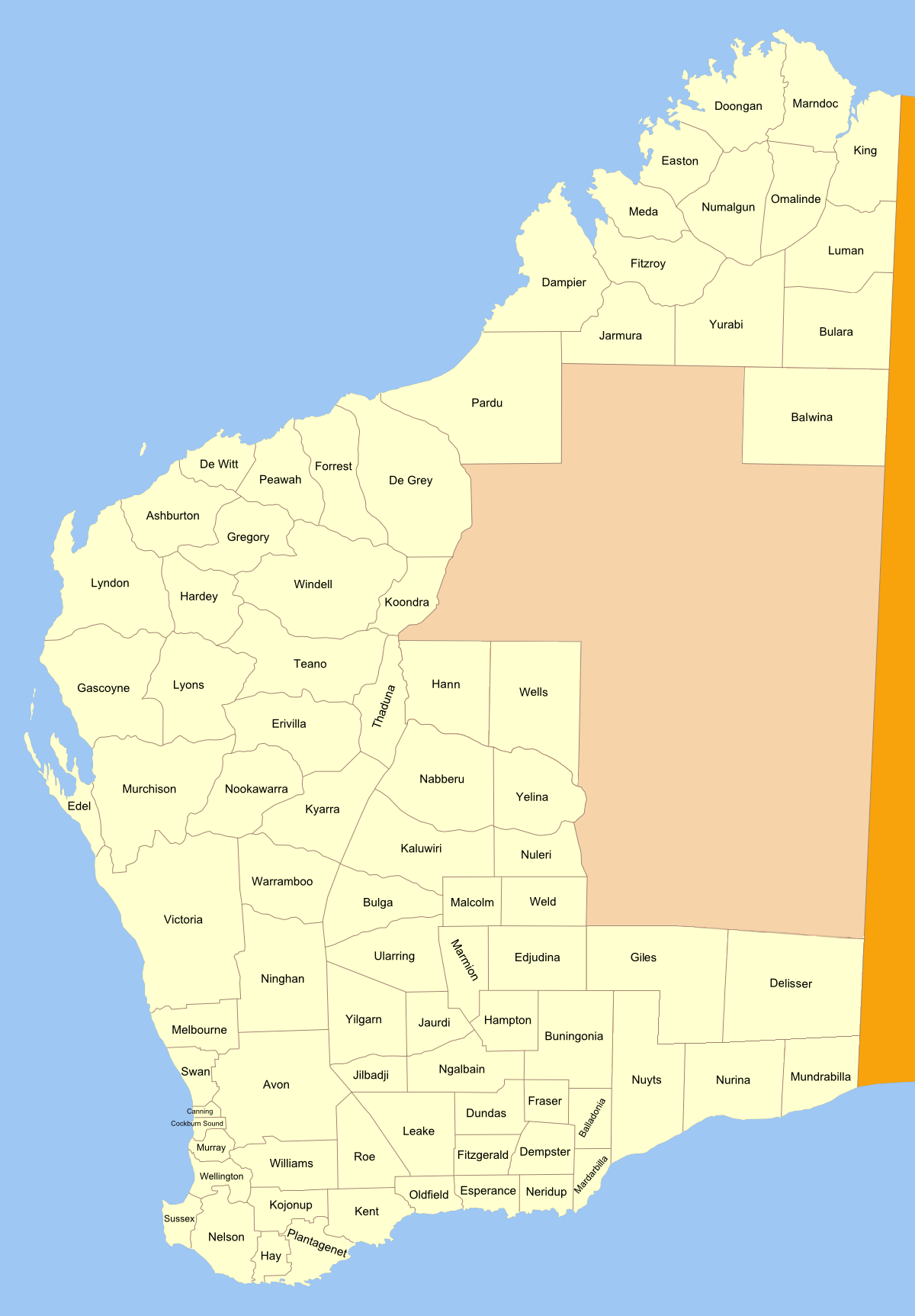
Lands administrative divisions around Oldfield:
Roe	Leake	Fitzgerald
Kent	Oldfield	Esperance
Kent	Southern Ocean	Southern Ocean

Oldfield Land District is a land district (cadastral division) of Western Australia partly within the Eucla and South-West divisions on the state's south coast. It spans roughly 33°15'S - 34°00'S in latitude and 119°45'E - 121°10'E in longitude.

== Location and features ==
The district is located on the Southern Ocean coast west of Esperance, extending west to Point Charles, east to Young River and north about 65 kilometres (40 mi) inland. Most of the district is within the Shire of Ravensthorpe, although part is within the Shire of Esperance. It includes the following townsites, with year of gazettal noted:

- Cascade (1976)
- Desmond (1909)
- Hopetoun (1901)
- Jerdacuttup (1966)
- Kundip (1902)
- Munglinup (1962)
- Ravensthorpe (1901)

== History ==
On 20 August 1896, Harry Johnston, the Deputy Surveyor General of Western Australia, recommended that four new districts be created in the Esperance region. The Minister approved the names on 11 September, and on 23 September 1896 the district was added to the Standard Plans in use by the Department of Lands and Surveys. As it was approved prior to the Land Act 1898, its boundaries were never gazetted.
