= Fitzgerald Land District =

Coordinates: 32°55′S 121°37′E

Fitzgerald Western Australia
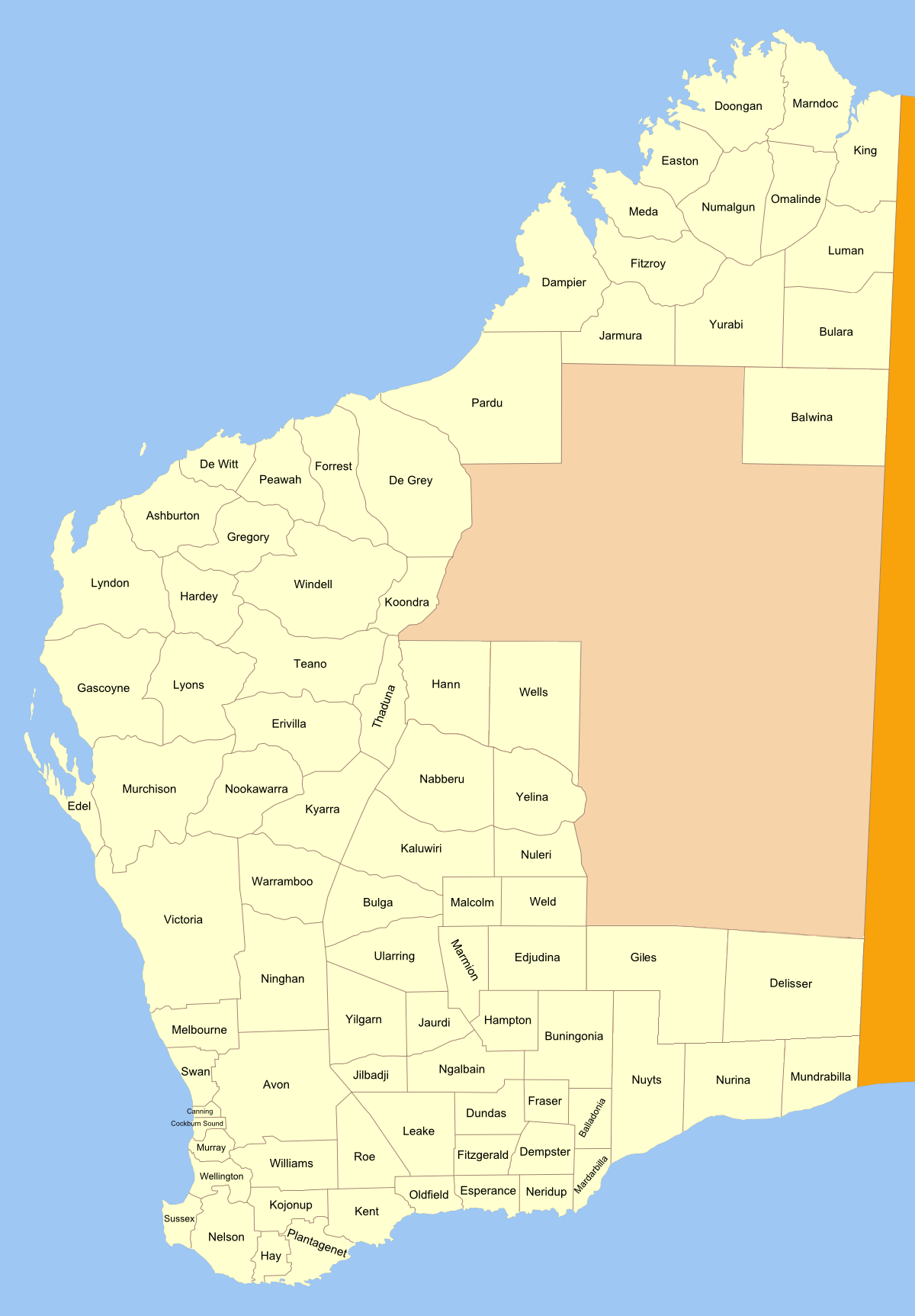
Lands administrative divisions around Fitzgerald:
| Leake | Dundas | Dempster |
| Leake | Fitzgerald | Dempster |
| Oldfield | Esperance | Esperance |

Fitzgerald Land District is a land district (cadastral division) of Western Australia, located within the Eucla Land Division inland from Esperance. It spans roughly 32°35'S - 33°15'S in latitude and 121°00'E - 122°15'E in longitude.

== Location and features ==
The district is located between the towns of Norseman and Esperance, bounded on the west by the Salt Lakes and on the east by Mount Ridley. It includes the following townsites (with year of gazettal noted):

- Dowak (1928)
- Grass Patch (1923)
- Red Lake (1922)
- Salmon Gums (1925)
- Truslove (1927; cancelled 1976)

== History ==
On 20 August 1896, Harry Johnston, the Deputy Surveyor General of Western Australia, recommended that four new districts be created in the Esperance region. The Fitzgerald district was named by the Minister on 11 September in honour of former Governor Charles Fitzgerald. On 23 September 1896, the district was added to the Standard Plans in use by the Department of Lands and Surveys. As it was approved prior to the Land Act 1898, its boundaries were never gazetted.
