= Elvire River =

River in Western Australia

Coordinates: 17°55′11″S 128°13′6″E

Location
- Country: Australia

Physical characteristics
- Source
  - elevation: 482 metres (1,581 ft)
- Mouth
  - location: Panton River
  - elevation: 210 metres (689 ft)
- Length: 127 km (79 mi)

The Elvire River is a river in the Kimberley region of Western Australia. The first European to see the Elvire River was government surveyor, Harry Johnston, who surveyed the river in 1884. The river is named after Margaret Elvire Forrest, the wife of the surveyor-general John Forrest.

The river rises north of Halls Creek below Mount Barrett and it flows in an easterly direction before turning north and discharging into the Panton River which is, in turn, a tributary of the Ord River. The river has ten tributaries including Halls Creek, Poverty Gully, Gentle Annie Creek, Black Elvire River, Johnston River, Bream Gorge and Mountain Creek.
