= Australian gold rushes =

Mass movement of Australians seeking gold (1851–1910s)

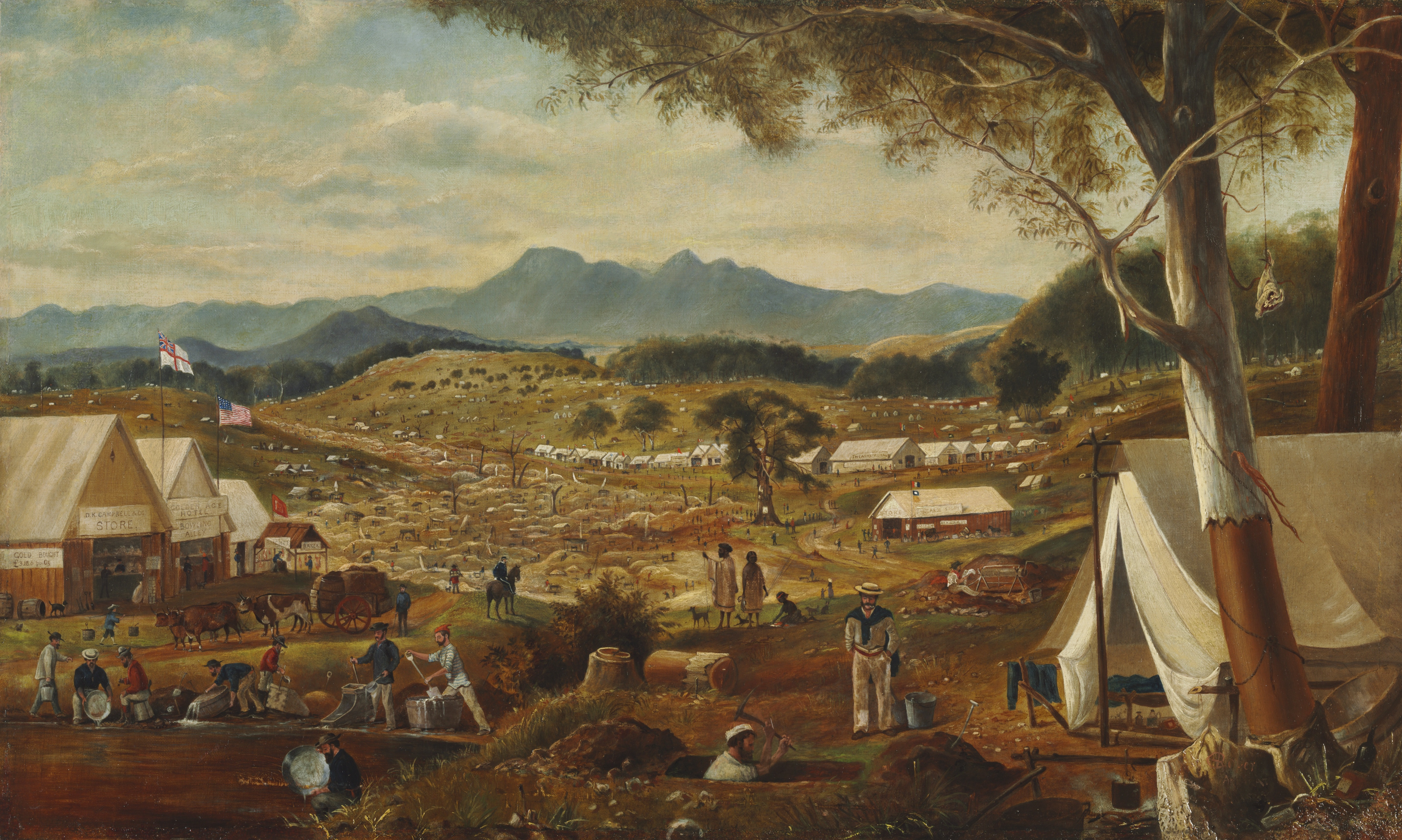
- Gold diggings, Ararat, Victoria, by Edward Roper, 1854
- Date: May 1851 – c. 1914
- Location: Australia
- Type: Gold rush
- Theme: Significant numbers of workers (both from other areas within Australia and from overseas) relocated to areas in which gold had been discovered
- Cause: Edward Hargraves claimed to have discovered payable gold near Orange
- Outcome: Changed the convict colonies into more progressive cities with the influx of free immigrants; Western Australia joined Federation

During the Australian gold rushes, a significant number of workers moved from elsewhere in Australia and overseas to where gold had been discovered. Gold had been found several times before, but the colonial government of New South Wales had suppressed the news out of the fear that it would reduce the workforce and destabilise the economy.

The Australian gold rushes made the convict colonies into more progressive cities with the influx of free immigrants.

After the California gold rush began in 1848, many people went there from Australia, so the government sought approval from the British Colonial Office for the exploitation of mineral resources and offered rewards for finding gold.

== History of discovery ==
The first gold rush in Australia began in May 1851 after prospector Edward Hargraves claimed to have discovered payable gold near Orange, at a site called Ophir. Hargraves had been to the California goldfields and had learned new gold prospecting techniques such as panning and cradling. Hargraves was offered rewards by the Colony of New South Wales and the Colony of Victoria. Before the end of the year, the gold rush had spread to many other parts of the state where gold had been found, not just to the west but also to the south and north of Sydney.

With the influx of free immigrants, the Australian gold rushes led to the development of more progressive cities from the former convict colonies. These hopefuls, termed diggers, brought new skills and professions, contributing to a burgeoning economy. The mateship that evolved between these diggers and their collective resistance to authority led to the emergence of a unique national identity. Although not all diggers found riches on the goldfields, many decided to stay and integrate into these communities.

In July 1851, Victoria's first gold rush began on the Clunes goldfield. In August, the gold rush spread to include the goldfield at Buninyong (today a suburb of Ballarat) 45 km (28 mi) away and, by early September 1851, to the nearby goldfield at Ballarat (then also known as Yuille's Diggings), followed in early September to the goldfield at Castlemaine (then known as Forest Creek and the Mount Alexander Goldfield) and the goldfield at Bendigo (then known as Bendigo Creek) in November 1851. Gold, just as in New South Wales, was also found in many other parts of the state. The Victorian Gold Discovery Committee wrote in 1854:

The discovery of the Victorian Goldfields has converted a remote dependency into a country of worldwide fame; it has attracted a population, extraordinary in number, with unprecedented rapidity; it has enhanced the value of property to an enormous extent; it has made this the richest country in the world; and, in less than three years, it has done for this colony the work of an age, and made its impulses felt in the most distant regions of the earth.

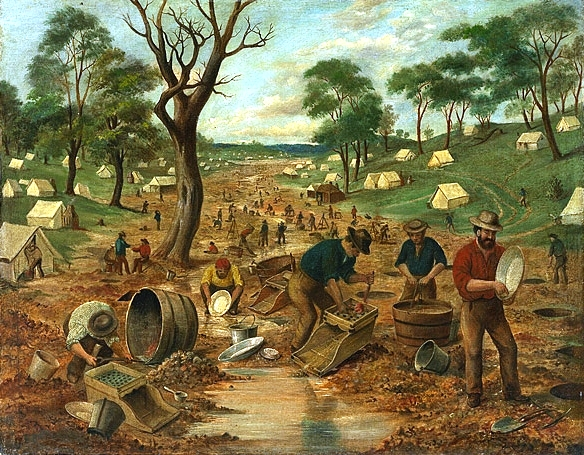
Australian gold diggings, by Edwin Stocqueler, c. 1855

When the rush began at Ballarat, diggers discovered it was a prosperous goldfield. Lieutenant-Governor Charles La Trobe visited the site and watched five men uncover 136 troy ounces (149 oz; 4,200 g) of gold in one day. Mount Alexander was even richer than Ballarat. With gold sitting just under the surface, the shallowness allowed diggers to unearth gold nuggets easily. In 7 months, 2,400,000 pounds (1,100 t) of gold was transported from Mount Alexander to nearby capital cities.

The gold rushes led to a massive influx of people from overseas. Australia's total population increased nearly fourfold from 430,000 in 1851 to 1.7 million in 1871. Australia first became a multicultural society during the gold rush period. Between 1852 and 1860, 290,000 people migrated to Victoria from the British Isles, 15,000 came from other European countries, and 18,000 emigrated from the United States. Some Chileans who had participated in the California gold rush moved to Australia, and so did the technologies they had introduced to California, such as the Chilean mill, which became common in Australian mining.

Some non-European immigrants, however, were unwelcome, especially the Chinese:

The Chinese were particularly industrious, with techniques that differed widely from the Europeans. This and their physical appearance and fear of the unknown led to them being persecuted in a racist way that would be regarded as untenable today.

In 1855, 11,493 Chinese arrived in Melbourne. Chinese travelling outside New South Wales had to obtain special re-entry certificates. In 1855, Victoria enacted the Chinese Immigration Act 1855, severely limiting the number of Chinese passengers permitted on an arriving vessel. To evade the new law, many Chinese were landed in the south-east of South Australia and travelled more than 400 km across country to the Victorian goldfields, along tracks that are still evident today.

In 1885, following a call by the Western Australian government for a reward for the first find of gold, a discovery was made at Halls Creek, sparking a gold rush in that state.

== Pre-rush gold finds ==
=== 1788: A hoax ===
In August 1788, convict James Daley reported to several people that he had found gold, "an inexhaustible source of wealth", "some distance down the harbour" (Port Jackson, Sydney). On the pretence of showing an officer the position of his gold find, Daley absconded into the bush for a day. For this escapade, Daley was to receive 50 lashes. Still insisting that he had found gold, Daley next produced a specimen of gold ore. Governor Arthur Phillip then ordered Daley to again be taken down the harbour to point out where he had found the gold.

Before being taken down the harbour, after being warned by an officer that he would be put to death if he attempted to deceive him, Daley confessed that his story about finding gold was "a falsehood". He had manufactured the specimen of gold ore that he had exhibited from a gold guinea and a brass buckle, and he produced the remains of the same as proof. For this deception, Daley received 100 lashes. Many convicts continued to believe that Daley had found gold and that he had only changed his story to keep the place of the gold find to himself. James Daley was hanged in December 1788 for breaking and entering and theft.

Some convicts who were employed cutting a road over the Blue Mountains were rumoured to have found small pieces of gold in 1815.

=== 1820: Blue Mountains, New South Wales ===
F. Stein was a Russian naturalist with the 1819–1821 Bellingshausen expedition to explore the Southern Ocean. Stein claimed to have sighted gold-bearing ore while he was on a 12-day trip to the Blue Mountains in March 1820. Many people were sceptical of his claim.

=== 1823: Bathurst region, New South Wales ===
The first officially recognised gold find in Australia was on 15 February 1823, (Note: BATHURST: Most sources give the date of discovery as 15 February, but a few indicate the date was 16 February instead.) by assistant surveyor James McBrien, at Fish River, between Rydal and Bathurst, New South Wales. McBrien noted the date in his field survey book along with, "At E. [End of the survey line] 1 chain 50 links to river and marked a gum tree. At this place I found numerous particles of gold convenient to river."

=== 1834: Monaro district, New South Wales ===
In 1834, with government help, John Lhotsky travelled to the Monaro district of New South Wales and explored its southern mountains. On returning to Sydney in that same year, he exhibited specimens that he had collected that contained gold.

=== 1837: Segenhoe, New South Wales ===
In 1837, gold and silver ore was found about 50 kilometres (30 mi) from Segenhoe near Aberdeen. The find was described in the newspapers as the discovery of a gold and silver mine about 50 kilometres (30 mi) from Thomas Potter Macqueen's Segenhoe Estate, by a Russian stockman employed in the neighbourhood of the discovery, which was located on Crown land.

=== 1839: Bathurst region, New South Wales ===
Paweł Strzelecki, geologist and explorer, found small amounts of gold in silicate in 1839 at the Vale of Clwyd near Hartley, a location on the road to Bathurst.

=== 1840: Lefroy, Tasmania ===
Gold is believed to have been found in Northern Tasmania at The Den (formerly known as Lefroy or Nine Mile Springs) near George Town in 1840 by a convict. In the 1880s, this became known as the Lefroy goldfields.

=== 1841–1842: Bathurst and Goulburn regions, New South Wales ===
The Reverend William Branwhite Clarke found gold on the Coxs River, a location on the road to Bathurst, in 1841. In 1842, he found gold on the Wollondilly River. In 1843, Clarke spoke to many people about the abundance of gold likely to be found in the colony of New South Wales. On 9 April 1844, Clarke exhibited a sample of gold in quartz to Governor Sir George Gipps. In that same year, Clarke showed the sample and spoke of the probable abundance of gold to some members of the New South Wales Legislative Council, including Justice Roger Therry, the member for Camden, and Joseph Phelps Robinson, then member for the Town of Melbourne.

In evidence that Clarke gave before a Select Committee of the NSW Legislative Council in September 1852, he stated that the subject was not followed up as "the matter was regarded as one of curiosity only, and considerations of the penal character of the colony kept the subject quiet, as much as the general ignorance of the value of such an indication." Towards the end of 1853, Clarke was given a grant of £1,000 (equivalent to A$154,000 in 2022) by the New South Wales government for his services in connection with the discovery of gold. The same amount (£1,000) was voted by the Victorian Gold Discovery Committee in 1854.

=== 1841: Pyrenees Ranges and Plenty Ranges, Victoria ===
Gold was found in the Pyrenees Ranges near Clunes, and in the Plenty Ranges near Melbourne in 1841; the gold was sent to Hobart, where it was sold.

=== From 1843: Victoria ===
Beginning in 1843, gold samples were brought several times into the watchmaker's shop of T. J. Thomas in Melbourne by "bushmen". The specimens were looked upon as curiosities.

=== 1844: Bundalong, Victoria ===
A shepherd named Smith thought that he had found gold near the Ovens River in 1844, and reported the matter to Charles La Trobe, who advised him to say nothing about it.

=== 1846: Castambul, South Australia ===
Gold was found in South Australia, and Australia's first gold mine was established. From the earliest days of the Colony of South Australia, men, including Johannes Menge, the geologist with the South Australian Company, had been seeking gold. "Armed with miner's pick, numberless explorers are to be found prying into the depths of the valleys or climbing the mountain tops. No place is too remote".

Gold was found in January 1846 by Captain Thomas Terrell at the Victoria Mine near Castambul, in the Adelaide Hills, South Australia, about 16 kilometres (10 mi) east of Adelaide. Some of the gold was made into a brooch sent to Queen Victoria. Samples were displayed at the Great Exhibition at the Crystal Palace in 1851. Share prices rose from £2 to £30, but soon fell back to £3 when no further gold was found. Unfortunately for the investors and everyone else concerned, the mine's total gold production never amounted to more than 24 ounces (680 g).

=== 1847: Victoria ===
Gold was found at Port Phillip (Victoria) by a shepherd. In April 1847, a shepherd took a sample of ore about the size of an apple, which he believed to be copper, into the jewellery store of Charles Brentani in Collins Street, Melbourne, where the sample was purchased by an employee, Joseph Forrester, a gold and silver smith. The shepherd refused to disclose to Forrester where he had obtained the nugget, but stated that "there was plenty more of it where it came from" on the station where he worked about 100 kilometres (60 mi) from Melbourne. The sample was tested by Forrester and found to be 65 percent virgin gold. A sample of this ore was given to Captain Clinch, who took it to Hobart.

=== 1847: Beaconsfield, Tasmania ===
It is said that John Gardner found gold-bearing quartz in 1847 on Blythe Creek, near Beaconsfield, on the other side of the Tamar River from George Town.

=== 1848: Wellington, New South Wales ===
Gold was found by a shepherd named McGregor at Mitchells Creek near Wellington, New South Wales, in 1848 on the Montefiore's squatting run, "Nanima". The Bathurst Free Press noted, on 25 May 1850, that "Neither is there any doubt in the fact that Mr M'Gregor found a considerable quantity of the precious metal some years ago, near Mitchell's Creek, and it is surmised he still gets more in the same locality."

=== 1848: Bathurst, New South Wales ===
William Tipple Smith found gold near Bathurst in 1848. Smith, a mineralogist and manager of the Fitzroy Ironworks in New South Wales, had been inspired to look for gold near Bathurst by the ideas of Roderick Murchison, president of the Royal Geographical Society, who in 1844 in his first presidential address, had predicted the existence of gold in Australia's Great Dividing Range, ideas which were published again in "The Sydney Morning Herald" on 28 September 1847 suggesting that gold "will be found on the western flanks of the dividing ranges". Smith sent samples of the gold he found to Murchison. Governor FitzRoy visited the Fitzroy Ironworks in late January 1849, and he was presented with "an elegant knife, containing twelve different instruments, of colonial workmanship, (mounted in colonial gold) the steel of which was smelted from the ore taken from the Fitz Roy mine".

=== 1848–1884: Pre–gold rush finds in Western Australia ===
Gold was first detected in Western Australia in 1848 in specimens sent for assay to Adelaide from copper and lead deposits found in the bed of the Murchison River, near Northampton, by explorer James Perry Walcott, a member of A. C. Gregory's party:

In 1852–53 rich specimens of gold-bearing stone were found by shepherds and others in the eastern districts, but they were unable afterwards to locate the places where the stone was discovered. The late Hon A. C. Gregory found traces of gold in quartz in the Bowes River in 1854. In 1861 Mr Panton found near Northam, while shortly afterwards a shepherd brought in rich specimens of auriferous quartz which he had found to the eastward of Northam, but he failed to locate the spot again.

Various small finds were made up to 1882, when Alexander McRae found gold between Cossack and Roebourne, with one nugget weighing upwards of 9 pennyweights (0.49 oz; 14 g) (dwt).

Edward Hardman, Government Geologist, found traces of gold in the East Kimberley in 1884. His report about his finds subsequently led to the discovery of payable gold and the first Western Australian gold rush.

=== 1848–1850: Pyrenees Ranges, Victoria ===
Gold was found in the Pyrenees Ranges in 1848 by a shepherd, Thomas Chapman. In December 1848, Chapman came into the jewellery store of Charles Brentani, in Collins Street, Melbourne, with a stone that he had "held for several months". Chapman said that he had found the gold where he worked on Charles Browning Hall (later Gold Commissioner) and Edmund McNeill's station at Daisy Hill (near Amherst) in the Pyrenees Ranges. Alexandre Duchene and Joseph Forrester, both working for Charles Brentani, confirmed the stone contained a total of 38 ounces (1,077 grams) of 90 percent pure gold, and Brentani's wife Ann purchased the stone on behalf of her husband.

A sample of this ore was given to Captain Clinch, who took it to Hobart; Captain White, who took it to England; and Charles La Trobe. As a consequence of the gold find by Chapman, official printed notices were posted in several prominent places in the town (Melbourne) proclaiming the fact that gold had been found in Port Phillip (Victoria). The Bertini's shop was thronged by persons wanting to see the nugget and asking where it had been discovered. This find sparked a mini gold rush with about a hundred men rushing to the site. This could perhaps be categorized as the first, though unofficial, gold rush in Victoria, or perhaps the gold rush that was stamped out.

Charles La Trobe quickly put an end to the search for gold in February 1849 by ordering 10 mounted police, William Dana and Richard McLelland in charge of 8 native troopers, to 'take possession of the Gold-mine', 'prevent any unauthorised occupation of Crown Lands in the neighbourhood' (Hall and McNeill's station was leased from the Crown), dismiss the gold-seekers and prevent any further digging at Daisy Hill. The story was then dismissed by some of the press as a hoax. This did not stop people from finding gold. In 1850, according to Brentani's wife Ann, the "gold came down from the country in all directions". She and her husband purchased as much as they could, but had difficulty in supplying the money.

=== 1849: Lefroy, Tasmania ===
The first substantiated find of gold in Tasmania was reported to have been made by a Mr Riva of Launceston, who is stated to have traced gold in slate rocks in the vicinity of The Den (formerly known as Lefroy or Nine Mile Springs) near George Town in 1849.

=== 1849: Woady Yaloak River, Victoria ===
The following news item from the Geelong Advertiser of 10 July 1849 shows the attitude of scepticism towards gold finds that were being brought into towns like Geelong during the pre–gold rush period:

GOLD. – A specimen of this valuable mineral was brought into town yesterday, having been picked up in a locality near the Wardy-yallock River. Of the identity of the metal there can be no mistake; but whether it was really taken from the spot indicated, or intended merely as a hoax or perhaps a swindle, it is quite impossible, at the present moment, to say. The piece exhibited, is of very small size; but, of course, as in all such instances, the lucky finder can obtain tons from the same spot by the simple mode of stooping down and picking it up.

The attitude was completely different just a couple of years later in 1853 after the Victorian gold rushes had begun:

Smythe's Creek, a branch of the Wardy Yallock river, is also attracting its share of the mining population, who are doing tolerably well. One very fine sample of gold has also been received in town during the week from the Wardy Yallock itself, found in the locality where the exploring party of last winter ended their labours. The parcel is small,- only 22 pennyweights (1.2 oz; 34 g)], but was obtained by one man in a week from very shallow surfacing.

=== 1850: Clunes, Victoria ===
In March 1850, pastoralist William Campbell found several minute pieces of native gold in quartz on the station of Donald Cameron at Clunes. William Campbell is notable as having been the first member of the electoral district of Loddon of the Victorian Legislative Council from November 1851 to May 1854. In 1854, Campbell received a £1,000 reward (equivalent to A$183,000 in 2022) from the Victorian Gold Discovery Committee as the original discoverer of gold at Clunes. At the time of the find in March 1850, Campbell was in the company of Donald Cameron, Cameron's superintendent, and a friend.

This find was concealed at the time because of the fear it would bring undesirable strangers to the run. Observing the migration of the population of New South Wales and the panic created throughout the whole colony, and especially in Melbourne, and further motivated by a £200 reward (equivalent to A$63,000 in 2022) that had been offered the day previous to anyone who could find payable gold within 320 kilometres (200 mi) of Melbourne, on 10 June 1851, Campbell addressed a letter to merchant James Graham (member of Victorian Legislative Council 1853–1854 and 1867–1886) stating that within a radius of 24 km (15 mi) of Burn Bank, on another party's station, he had procured specimens of gold.

Campbell divulged the precise spot where the gold had been found in a letter to Graham dated 5 July 1851. Before this date, however, James Esmond and his party were already at work there, mining for gold. This was because Cameron had earlier shown specimens of the gold to George Hermann Bruhn, a German doctor and geologist whose services as an analyst were in great demand. Communication of this knowledge by Hermann to James Esmond was to result in the discovery by Esmond on 1 July 1851 of payable quantities of alluvial gold at Clunes and lead to the first Victorian gold rush.

== Notable gold finds that started rushes ==
=== February 1851: Orange, New South Wales ===
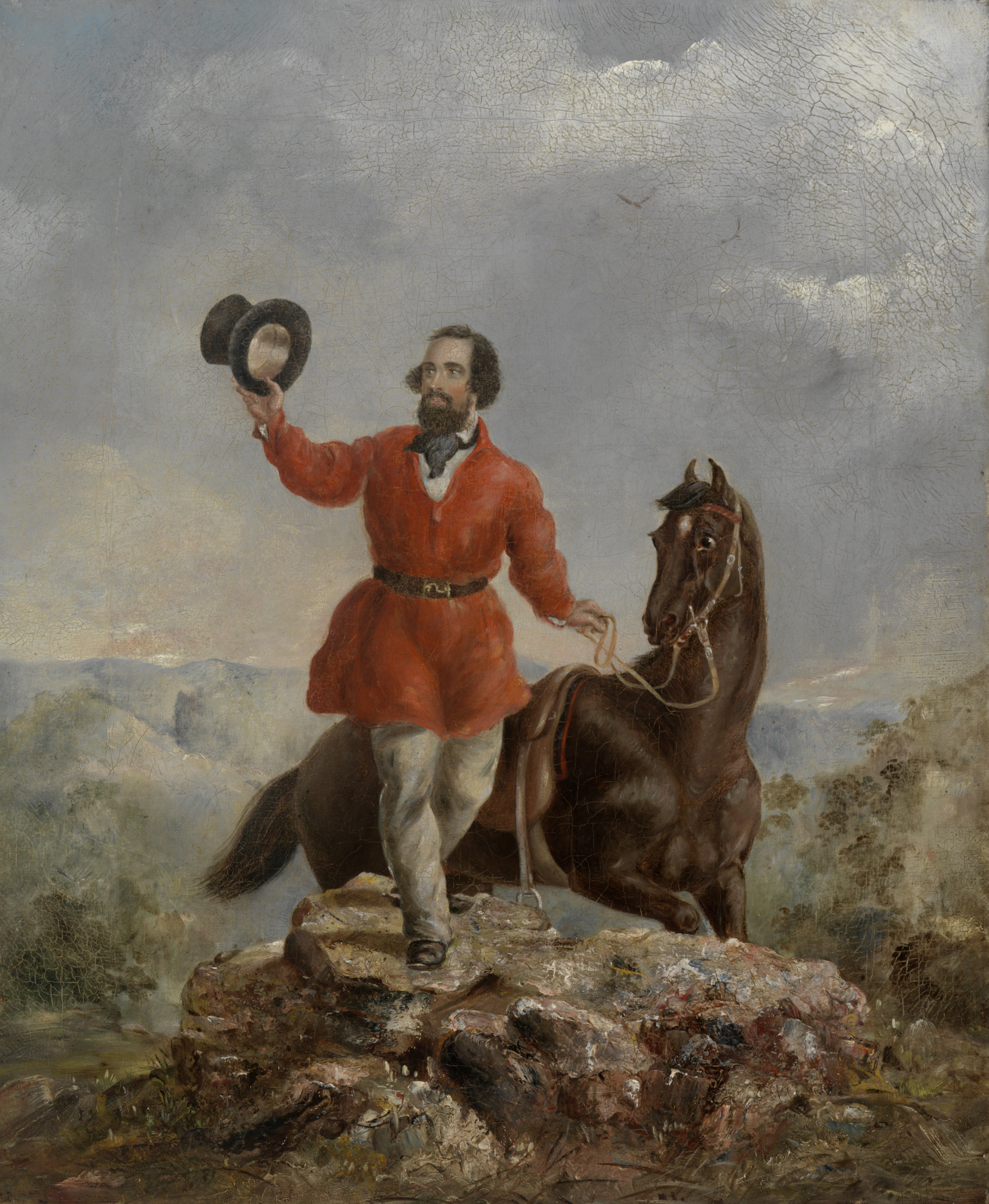
Edward Hargraves, returning the salute of the gold miners, 1851, Thomas Balcombe

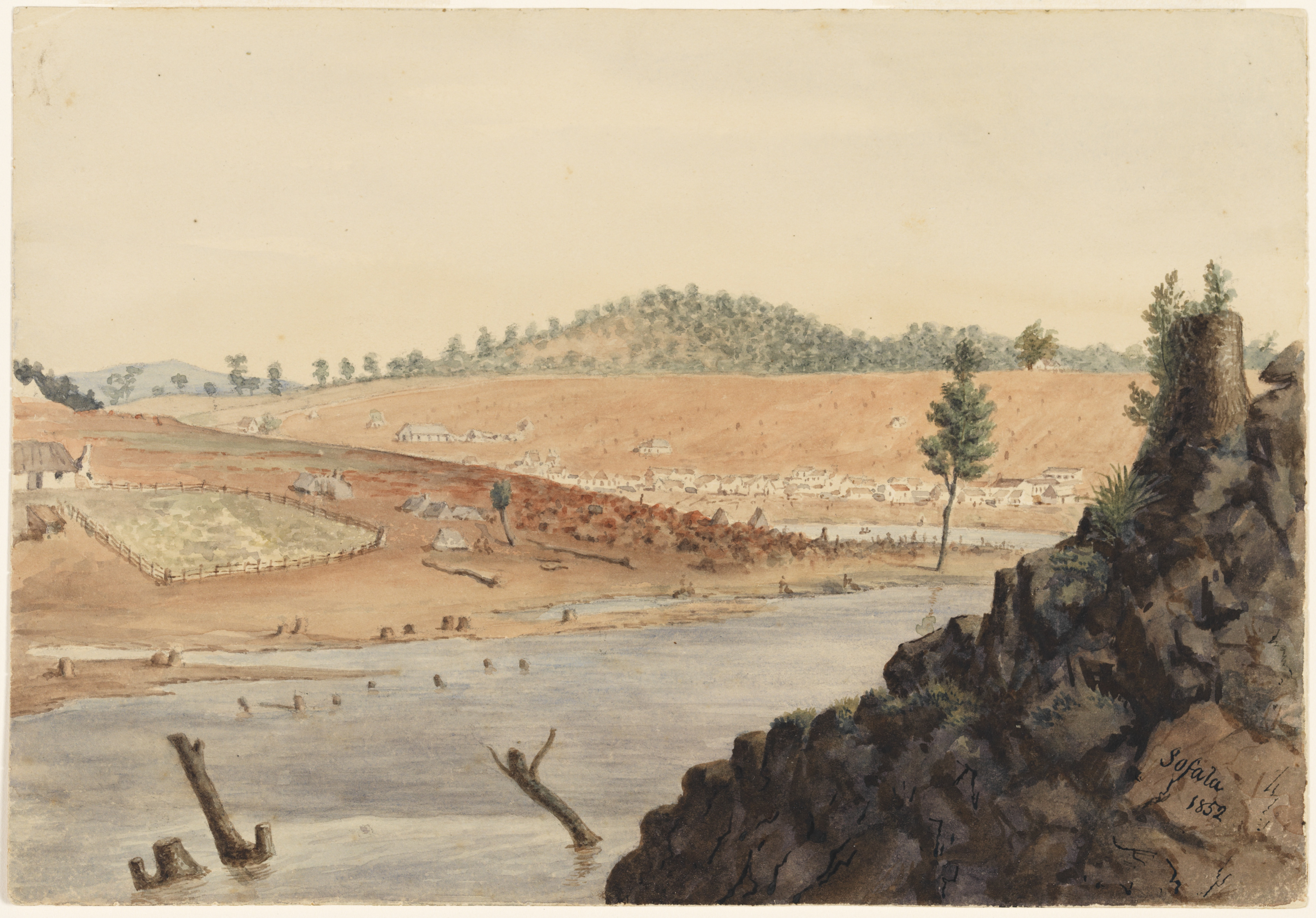
Sofala Gold Field, New South Wales, 1852

Edward Hargraves, accompanied by John Lister, found five specks of alluvial gold at Ophir near Orange in February 1851. In April 1851, John Lister and William Tom, trained by Edward Hargraves, found 120 grams of gold. This discovery, instigated by Hargraves, led directly to the beginning of the gold rush in New South Wales. This was the first gold rush in Australia. It was in full operation by May 1851, even before it was officially proclaimed as such on 14 May 1851.

There were an estimated 300 diggers in place by 15 May 1851. Before 14 May 1851, gold was already flowing from Bathurst to Sydney, an example being when Edward Austin brought to Sydney a nugget of gold worth £35 (equivalent to A$12,000 in 2022), which had been found in the Bathurst District.

In 1872, a large gold and quartz "Holtermann Nugget" was discovered by the night shift, in a mine part owned by Bernhardt Holtermann at Hill End, near Bathurst, New South Wales. It was the largest specimen of reef gold ever found: 1.5 metres (59 in) long, weighing 286 kg (631 lb), in Hill End, near Bathurst, and with an estimated gold content of 5,000 troy ounces (160 kg).

=== April 1851: Castlemaine district and Clunes, Victoria ===
In January 1851, before Hargraves' find of gold in February 1851 at Ophir, George Hermann Bruhn left Melbourne to explore the mineral resources of the countryside of Victoria. On his trek, Bruhn found, on a date unknown, indications of gold in quartz about 3 kilometres (2 mi) from Edward Stone Parker's station at Franklinford, between Castlemaine and Daylesford. After leaving Parker's station, Bruhn arrived at Donald Cameron's station at Clunes in April 1851.

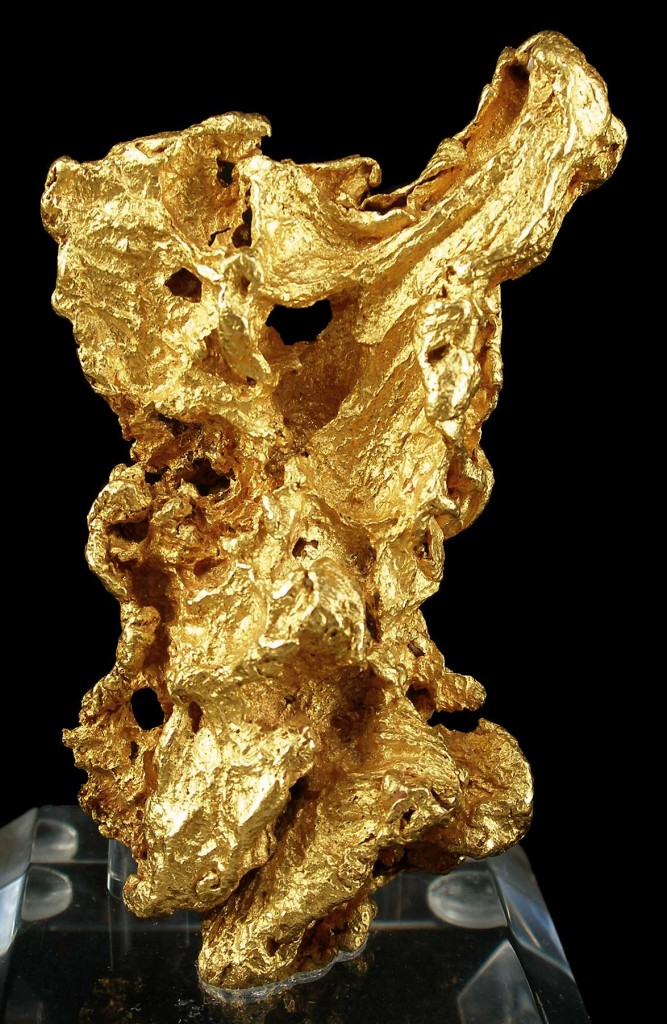
A large gold specimen from the Ballarat mines, weighing over 150 grams, size 7.4×4.4×2.3 cm

Cameron showed Bruhn samples of the gold that had been found on his station at Clunes in March 1850. Bruhn explored the countryside and found quartz reefs in the vicinity. "This information he promulgated through the country in the course of his journey." One of the people to whom Bruhn communicated this information was James Esmond, who was at that time engaged in erecting a building on James Hodgkinson's station "Woodstock" at Lexton about 26 kilometres (16 mi) to the west of Clunes. This then indirectly led to the first gold rush in Victoria from Esmond's discovery of payable gold at Clunes in July 1851.

Bruhn forwarded specimens of gold to Melbourne, which were received by the Gold Discovery Committee on 30 June 1851. In 1854, Bruhn received a £500 reward (equivalent to A$91,000 in 2022) from the Victorian Gold Discovery Committee "in acknowledgment of his services in exploring the country for five or six months, and for diffusing the information of the discovery of gold".

=== June 1851: Sofala, New South Wales ===
Gold was found at the Turon Goldfields at Sofala in June 1851.

=== June 1851: Warrandyte, Victoria ===
On 9 June 1851, a reward of £200 (equivalent to A$68,000 in 2022) was offered to the first person to discover payable gold within 320 kilometres (200 mi) of Melbourne. Henry Frencham, then a reporter for The Times, and shortly afterwards for The Argus, was determined to be one of the persons to claim this reward. On 11 June 1851, he formed one of a party of 8 to search for gold north and north-east of Melbourne. Only 2 days later, the party had dwindled to two men, Frencham and W. H. Walsh, who found what they thought to be gold at Warrandyte. At 5 pm on 13 June 1851, Frencham deposited with the Town Clerk at Melbourne, William Kerr, specimens of gold. The next day, the headline in The Times newspaper was "Gold Discovery".

On 24 June 1851, Frencham and Walsh lodged a claim for the reward offered by the Gold Committee for the discovery of a payable goldfield in the Plenty Ranges about 40 kilometres (25 mi) from Melbourne. The claim was not allowed. The specimens were tested by chemists Hood and Sydney Gibbons, who could not find a trace of gold, but this may have been because they had little expertise in the area. Even if they had determined that the samples contained gold, it was not payable gold. Frencham always claimed to have been the first to find gold in the Plenty Ranges.

On 30 June 1851, gold was definitely found about 36 km (22 mi) north-east of Melbourne in the quartz rocks of the Yarra Ranges at Anderson's Creek, Warrandyte, Victoria, by Louis John Michel, William Haberlin, James Furnival, James Melville, James Headon and B.Gruening. This gold was shown at the precise spot where it had been found to Webb Richmond, on behalf of the Gold Discovery Committee, on 5 July. The full particulars of the locality were communicated to the Lieutenant-Governor on 8 July, and a sample was brought to Melbourne and exhibited to the Gold Discovery Committee on 16 July. As a result, the Gold Discovery Committee believed that this find was the first publication of the location of the discovery of a goldfield in the Colony of Victoria.

This site was later named Victoria's first official gold discovery. Michel and his party were in 1854 to receive a £1,000 reward (equivalent to A$183,000 in 2022) from the Victorian Gold Discovery Committee "as having, at considerable expense, succeeded in discovering and publishing an available goldfield". On 1 September 1851, the first gold licences in Victoria were issued to dig for gold in this locality, "which was previous to their issue on any other Goldfield". About 300 people were at work on this goldfield before the discovery of Ballarat.

=== July 1851: Clunes, Victoria ===
On 1 July 1851, Victoria became a separate colony, and, on the same day, James Esmond—in company with Pugh, Burns and Kelly—found alluvial gold in payable quantities near Donald Cameron's station on Creswick's Creek, a tributary of the Loddon, at Clunes, 34 km (21 mi) north of Ballarat. Esmond and his party found the gold after Esmond had been told by George Hermann Bruhn of the gold that had been found in March 1850 on Cameron's property at Clunes, and that in the vicinity were quartz reefs which were likely to bear gold. Esmond rode into Geelong with a sample of their discovery on 5 July. News of the discovery was published first in the Geelong Advertiser on 7 July and then in Melbourne on 8 July:

Gold in the Pyrenees. The long sought treasure is at length found! Victoria is a gold country, and from Geelong goes forth the first glad tidings of the discovery. Esmonds arrived in Geelong on Saturday with some beautiful specimens of gold, in quartz, and gold-dust in a "debris" of the same species of rock. The specimens have been subjected to the most rigid test by Mr Patterson, in the presence of other competent parties, and he pronounced them to be beyond any possibility of doubt pure gold...

The particulars of the precise location, with Esmond's consent, was published in the Geelong Advertiser on 22 July 1851. Publication of Esmond's find started the first official gold rush in Victoria in that same month. By 1 August between 300 and 400 diggers were encamped on the Clunes Goldfield, but soon moved to other fields as news of other gold discoveries spread. Esmond was in 1854 to receive a £1,000 reward (equivalent to A$183,000 in 2022) as "the first actual producer of alluvial gold for the market".

=== July 1851: Bungonia and other finds, New South Wales ===
The following goldfields were discovered in New South Wales during July 1851:

- Bungonia (aka Shoalhaven)
- Hill End
- Louisa Creek (now Hargraves) near Mudgee
- Moruya

=== July 1851: Castlemaine, Victoria ===
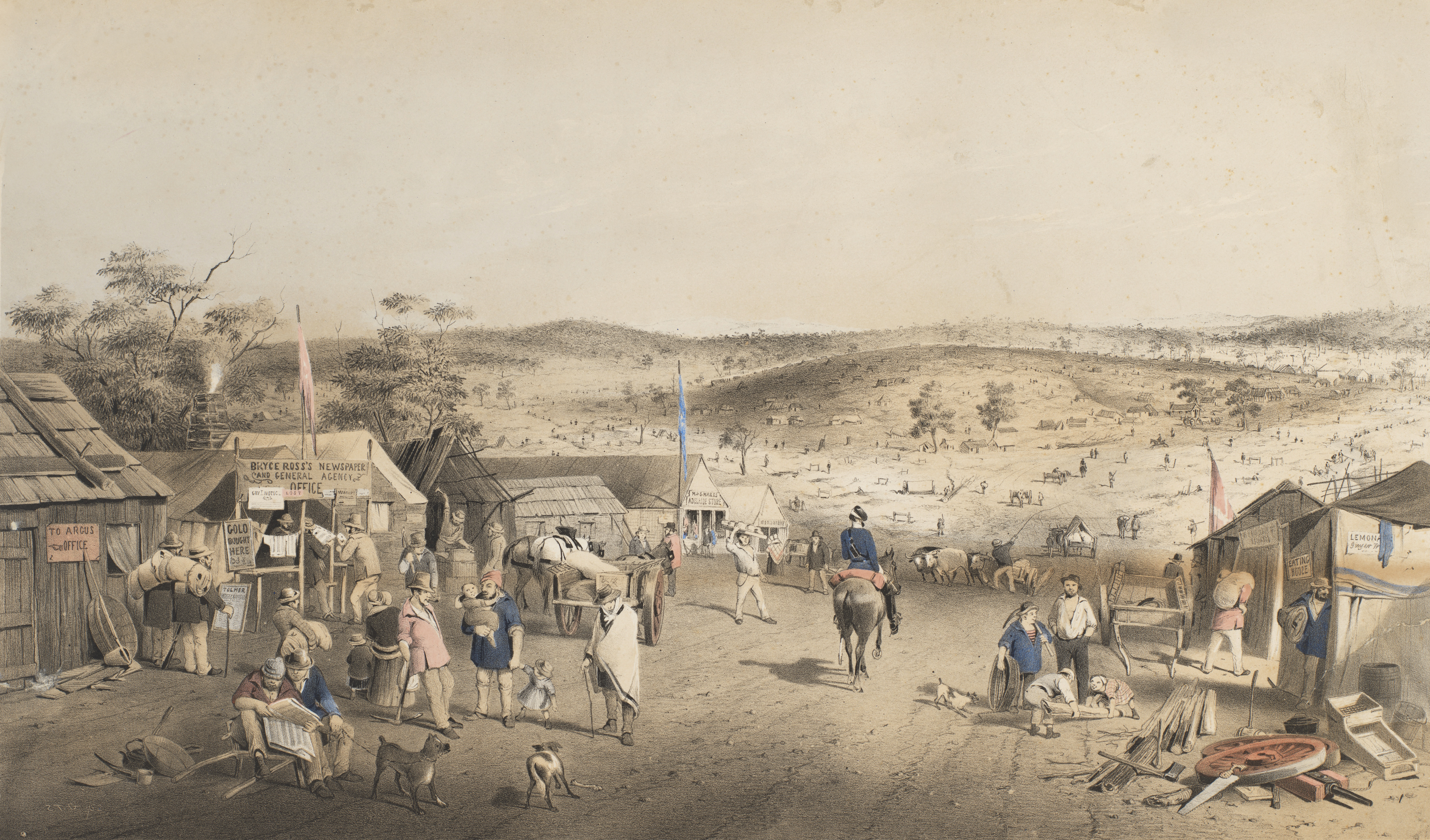
A view of the first small village to develop on the Mount Alexander goldfields at Chewton (then known as Forest Creek) near Castlemaine in 1852, painted by Samuel Thomas Gill

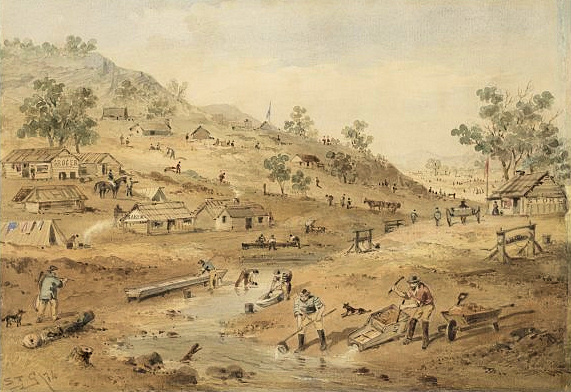
Another view of the Mount Alexander goldfields in 1852, painted by Samuel Thomas Gill

On 20 July 1851, gold was found near present-day Castlemaine, Victoria (Mt Alexander Goldfields), at Specimen Gully in today's Castlemaine suburb of Barkers Creek. The gold was first found by Christopher Thomas Peters, a shepherd and hut-keeper on the Barker's Creek, in the service of William Barker. When the gold was shown in the men's quarters Peters was ridiculed for finding fool's gold, and the gold was thrown away. Barker did not want his workmen to abandon his sheep, but in August they did just that.

John Worley, George Robinson and Robert Keen, also in the employ of Barker as shepherds and a bullock driver, immediately teamed with Peters in working the deposits by panning in Specimen Gully, which they did in relative privacy during the next month. When Barker sacked them and ran them off for trespass, Worley, on behalf of the party "to prevent them getting in trouble", mailed a letter to The Argus dated 1 September 1851 announcing this new goldfield with the precise location of their workings. This letter was published on 8 September 1851.

"With this obscure notice, rendered still more so by the journalist as 'Western Port', were ushered to the world the inexhaustible treasures of Mount Alexander", also to become known as the Forest Creek diggings. Within a month there were about 8,000 diggers working the alluvial beds of the creeks near the present day town of Castlemaine, and particularly Forest Creek which runs through the suburb today known as Chewton where the first small township was established. By the end of the year there were about 25,000 on the field.

=== August 1851: Buninyong, Victoria ===
On 8 August 1851, an auriferous deposit of gold was found 3 kilometres west of Buninyong, Victoria, near Ballarat. The gold was discovered in a gully in the Buninyong ranges, by a resident of Buninyong, Thomas Hiscock. Hiscock communicated the find, with its precise locality, to the editor of the Geelong Advertiser on 10 August. In that same month prospectors began moving from the Clunes to the Buninyong diggings. Hiscock was in 1854 to receive £1,000 (equivalent to A$183,000 in 2022) reward from the Victorian Gold Discovery Committee as the substantial discoverer of the gold deposits of "superior value" in the Ballarat area.

=== August 1851: Ballarat, Victoria ===
On 21 August 1851, gold was found at Ballarat, Victoria, in Poverty Point by John Dunlop and James Regan. Ballarat is about 10 km (6.2 mi) from Buninyong and upon the same range. John Dunlop and James Regan found their first few ounces of gold while panning in the Canadian Creek after leaving the Buninyong diggings to extend their search for gold. However, Henry Frencham, a newspaperman who in June had claimed, unsuccessfully, the £200 (equivalent to A$34,000 in 2022) reward for finding payable gold within 200 miles (320 km) of Melbourne, had followed them and noticed their work. As a result, they only had the rich Ballarat goldfield to themselves for a week.

By early September 1851, what became known as the Ballarat gold rush had begun, as reported from the field by Henry Frencham, then a reporter for The Argus. (Henry Frencham claimed in his article of 19 September 1851 to have been the first to discover gold at Ballarat [then also known as Yuille's Diggings] "and make it known to the public", a claim he was later to also make about Bendigo, and which resulted in the sitting of a Select Committee of the Victorian Legislative Assembly in 1890.)

In the report of the Committee on the Claims to Original Discovery of the Goldfields of Victoria published in The Argus newspaper of 28 March 1854, however, a different picture of the discovery of gold at Golden Point at Ballarat is presented. They stated that Regan and Dunlop were one of two parties working at the same time on opposite sides of the ranges forming Golden Point, the other contenders for the first finders of gold at Ballarat being described as "Mr Brown and his party".

The committee stated that "where so many rich deposits were discovered almost simultaneously, within a radius of little more than 800 m (0.5 mi), it is difficult to decide to whom is due the actual commencement of the Ballarat diggings." They also agreed that the prospectors "had been attracted there (Ballarat) by the discoveries in the neighbourhood of Messrs. Esmonds (Clunes) and Hiscock (Buninyong)" and "by attracting great numbers of diggers to the neighbourhood" that "the discovery of Ballarat was but a natural consequence of the discovery of Buninyong".

In 1858, the "Welcome Nugget" weighing 2,217 troy ounces 16 pennyweight (68.98 kg) was found at Bakery Hill at Ballarat by a group of 22 Cornish miners working at the mine of the Red Hill Mining Company.

=== September 1851: Bendigo, Victoria ===
It has been claimed that Gold was first found at Bendigo, Victoria, by 2 women, Margaret Kennedy and Julia Farrell in September 1851.

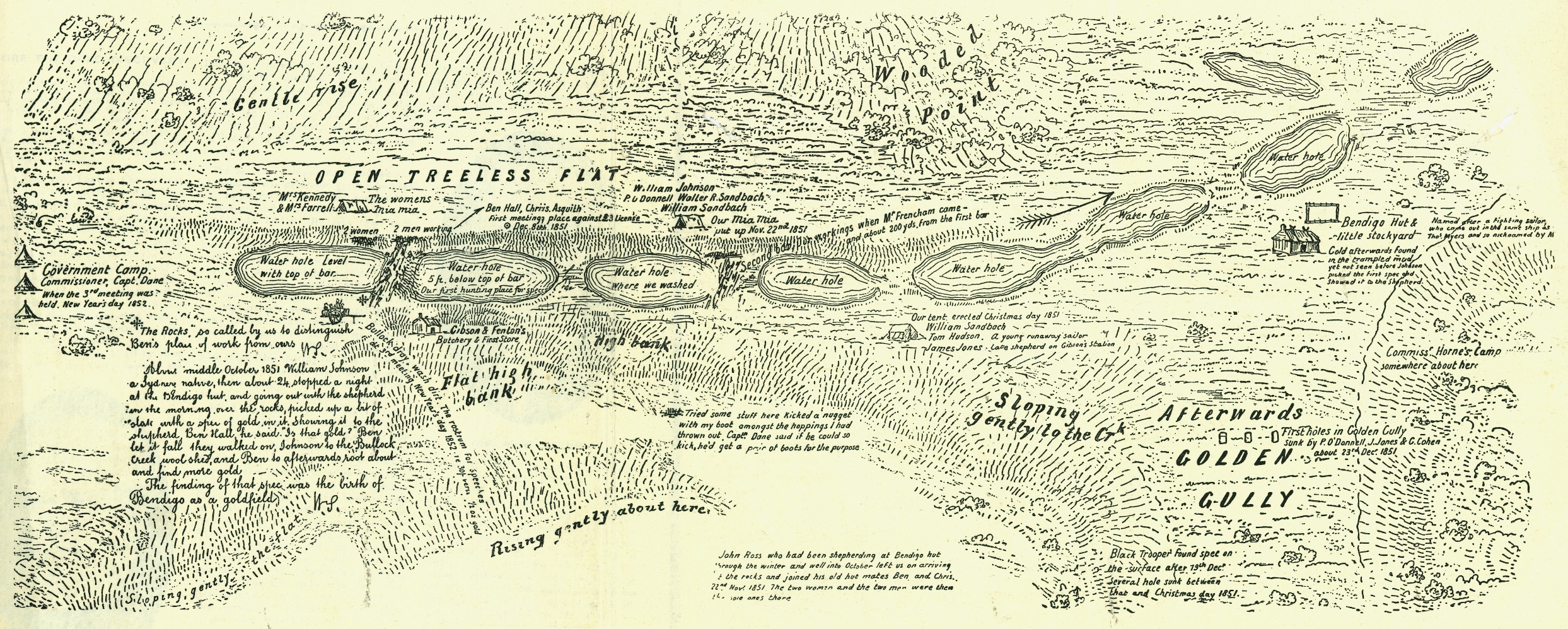
Sketch-map of the Bendigo goldfield, by shepherd William Sandbach, depicting claims and camp sites

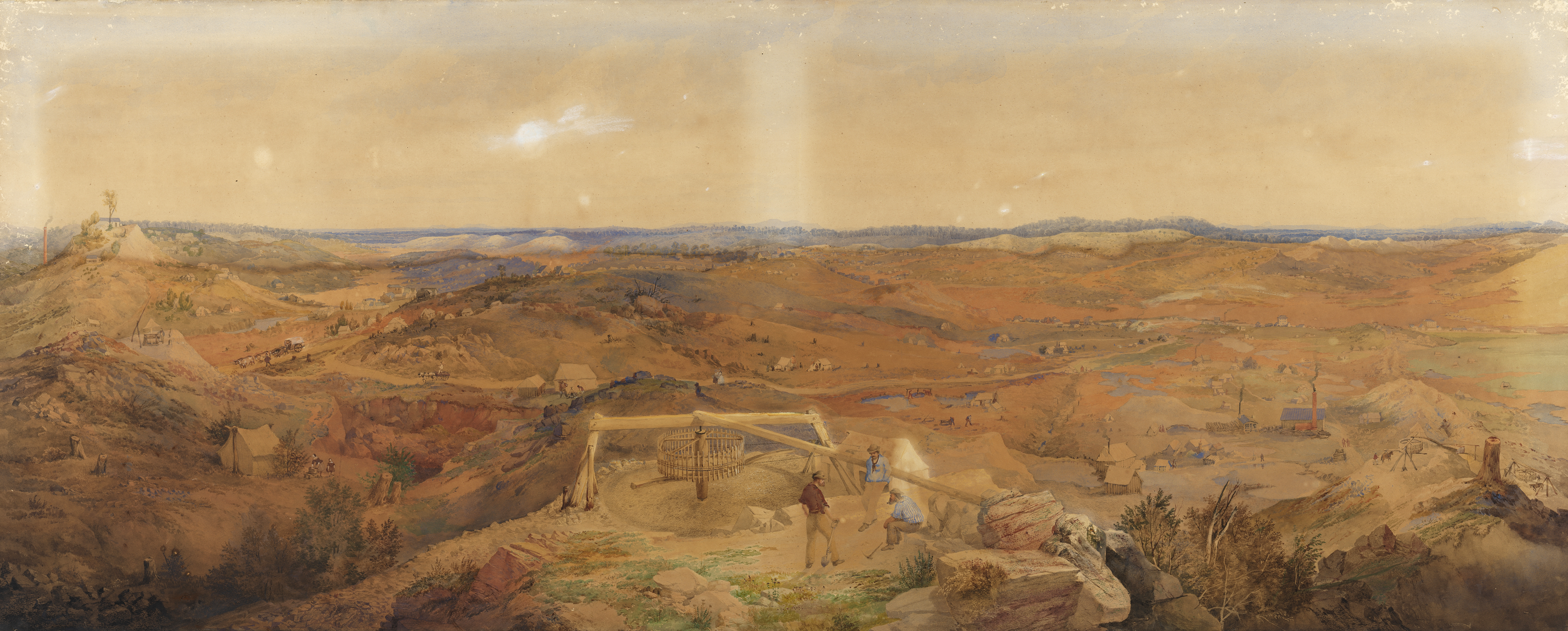
Mining at old Bendigo, Victoria, Australia, 1857, by George Rowe

The four sets of serious contenders for the first finders of gold on what became the Bendigo goldfield are, in no particular order:

- Stewart Gibson and Frederick Fenton. Stewart Gibson was one of the two brothers who owned/leased the Mount Alexander North Run in 1851, and Frederick Fenton was the then manager/overseer and later owner. Fenton claimed that he and (his brother-in-law) Stewart Gibson had been together when in they found gold in a water-hole near the junction of Bendigo Creek with what later became known as Golden Gully in September 1851, just before shearing commenced, but they decided at the time to keep it quiet;
- one or more of the shepherds living in the hut, named the Bendigo hut, on the Mount Alexander North Run near the junction of Bendigo Creek with what later became known as Golden Gully, a hut that was within yards of "The Rocks". These were James Graham (alias Ben Hall), Benjamin Bannister, and hut-keeper Christian Asquith, and/or a Sydney-born cook/shepherd who visited them at the hut named William Johnson. These men were mentioned in the evidence of many witnesses at the 1890 Select Committee;
- one or more of Mrs Margaret Kennedy, Mrs Farrell, and/or Margaret Kennedy's 9-year-old son from her first marriage, John Drane; and
- one or both of the husbands of the two women named above. John "Happy Jack" Kennedy, was shepherd/overseer of the Mount Alexander Run who had a hut named after him on the Bullock Creek at what is today known as Lockwood South, and Patrick Peter Farrell was a self-employed cooper working on the Mount Alexander Run during the shearing season. Farrell gave evidence to the 1890 Select Committee that he had been the first to find gold, and Kennedy made similar claims during his lifetime which were published in his obituary in 1883.

According to the Bendigo Historical Society, it has today, contrary to the findings of the Select Committee of 1890, become "generally agreed" or "acknowledged" that gold was found at Bendigo Creek by two married women from the Mount Alexander North Run (later renamed the Ravenswood Run), Margaret Kennedy and Mrs Farrell. A monument to this effect was erected by the City of Greater Bendigo beside the Bendigo Creek, Golden Square on 28 September 2001, as part of a commemoration of 150 years of gold in Bendigo. (Note: BENDIGO: 'COMMEMORATING 150 YEARS OF GOLD. Mrs. Margaret Kennedy and Mrs. Farrell found gold near this spot in the spring of 1851. Discovery of gold marked the beginning of Bendigo, which became eastern Australia's most productive goldfield. "The Golden Trail" project supported by the Victorian Government through the Community Support Fund. 28 SEPTEMBER, 2001. City of Greater Bendigo; Cr Barry Ackerman, Mayor; Gold 150 Victoria; Community Support Fund Victoria; 150 Years of Gold, Bendigo, Mrs Faye Buerger, Project Manager.')

This acknowledgement is not shared by contemporaneous historians such as Robert Coupe who wrote in his book Australia's Gold Rushes, first published in 2000, that "there are several accounts of the first finds in the Bendigo area". Also, as stated by local Bendigo historian Rita Hull: "For decades many historians (Note: BENDIGO: "Many historians" cannot be substantiated. It is difficult to find a historian who has written that gold was first found at Bendigo by Mrs Margaret Kennedy and Mrs Farrell.) have made the bold statement that Margaret Kennedy and her friend Julia Farrell (Note: BENDIGO: The first person to document Mrs Farrell with the first name of Julia was Rita Hull in her 2011 book.) were the first to find gold at Bendigo Creek, but on what grounds do they make this statement?". (Note: BENDIGO: In this book Rita Hull unfortunately documents the wrong Patrick Farrell (c. 1826–1904) and the wrong Mrs Farrell. She documents a Mrs Julia Farrell nee Abel (1831-1916) who died in 1916, her husband who died in 1904, who married in Melbourne in 1848, and who had 7 children between 1856 and 1866. The incorrect Mrs Farrell (Mrs Julia Farrell) is found living with her husband, the incorrect Patrick Farrell, pensioner, in the 1903 electoral roll at 48 Harmsworth St, Collingwood, while at the same time the correct Patrick Peter Farrell (c. 1830–1905), pensioner, is shown living at 21 Wood [sic – it should read Hood] St, Collingwood. In the 1905 electoral roll, the wrong Mrs Farrell (Mrs Julia Farrell) was still living at 48 Harmsworth St (with her deceased husband also listed, as his name had not yet been removed from the electoral roll), while the correct Patrick Pater Farrell had moved to 34 Vere Street, Collingwood, where he is also recorded on the 1905 Victorian Directory as Patrick P. Farrell. (In 1890, Patrick Peter Farrell, a cooper, gave his address to the 1890 Select Committee as 544 Canning St, Carlton; on 7 November 1892, he was recorded in the Victorian Rate Book as Patrick P. Farrell, also a cooper, at 22 Hood St, Collingwood in a house owned by himself; in 1893, the Victorian Directory records him as Patrick P. Farrell next door at 21 Hood St, while the 1899 Victorian Referendum records him as a cooper at 21 Hood St.) Further evidence that the incorrect couple were researched is found in Rita Hull's book at page 19. Here she writes about the Patrick and Julia Farrell that she researched living with their daughter at Eaglehawk, near Bendigo, in 1879 and 1884 and having been admitted to Bendigo Goldfields Hospital: Julia Farrell in 1879, and Patrick Farrell in 1884. The admission record for this Patrick Farrell on 5 November 1884 lists his occupation as drover, not cooper. The correct man, Patrick Peter Farrell, is stated to be a cooper in 1851, in 1890 at the Select Committee, on 7 November 1892 Victorian Rate Book, and on the 1899 Victorian Referendum. The only time his occupation is shown as anything but a cooper was after he retired when on the 1903 and 1905 electoral rolls he is shown as a pensioner. He was never a drover. The death certificate for Patrick Peter Farrell provides very little detail about his life apart from the fact that he was born in Ireland, and none about his wife. No documentary evidence has been found about his wife, Mrs Farrell, apart from that in relation to the 1890 Select Committee. Her death was not recorded.)

In September 1890, a Select Committee of the Victorian Legislative Assembly began sitting to decide who was the first to discover gold at Bendigo. They stated that there were 12 claimants who had made submissions to being the first to find gold at Bendigo (this included Mrs Margaret Kennedy but not Mrs Farrell), plus the journalist Henry Frencham who claimed to have discovered gold at Bendigo Creek in November 1851. (Frencham had previously also claimed to have been the first to have discovered gold at Warrandyte in June 1851 when he, unsuccessfully, claimed the £200 (equivalent to A$34,000 in 2022) reward for finding payable gold within 200 miles (320 km) of Melbourne; and then he also claimed to be the first to have discovered gold at Ballarat [then also known as Yuille's Diggings] "and make it known to the public" in September 1851.)

According to a Select Committee of the Victorian Parliament, the name of the first discoverer of gold on the Bendigo goldfield is unknown. The Select Committee inquiring into this matter in September and October 1890 examined many witnesses but was unable to decide between the various claimants. They were, however, able to decide that the first gold on the Bendigo goldfields was found in 1851 at "The Rocks" area of Bendigo Creek at Golden Square, which is near where today's Maple Street crosses the Bendigo Creek. As the date of September 1851, or soon after, and place, at or near "The Rocks" on Bendigo Creek, were also mentioned in relation to three other sets of serious contenders for the first finders of gold on what became the Bendigo goldfields, all associated with the Mount Alexander North Run (later renamed the Ravenswood Run).

They reasoned that:

- Many others have also claimed to have been the first to have found gold at Bendigo Creek.
- Mrs Farrell is never documented to have made this claim.
- Margaret Kennedy also claimed to have found gold without the help of Mrs Farrell whilst accompanied by her 9-year-old son John Drane.
- Both their husbands, John "Happy Jack" Kennedy and Patrick Peter Farrell, are also documented to have claimed to have been the first to have found gold, and were also seen at various times with the two women at the Bendigo Creek by witnesses.

When Margaret Kennedy gave evidence before the Select Committee in September 1890 she claimed to alone have found gold near "The Rocks" in early September 1851. She claimed that she had taken her (9-year-old) son, John Drane (Note: BENDIGO: Margaret Kennedy, also took her 3 younger daughters with her to prospect for gold: Mary Ann Drane, 7, and Mary Jane Kennedy, 2, and baby Lucy Kennedy. They were not mentioned by her as they were unable to assist in the gold prospecting, with 7-year-old Mary Ann instead, of necessity, assisting with child-minding of her younger sisters. Other witnesses to the 1890 Select Committee mentioned the children, or noted seeing her son helping out in the gold prospecting. In adulthood Mary Jane Kennedy reported having been on the Bendigo goldfield with her mother.) with her to search for gold near "The Rocks" after her husband had told her that he had seen gravel there that might bear gold, and that she was joined by her husband in the evenings. She also gave evidence that after finding gold she "engaged" Mrs Farrell and went back with her to pan for more gold at the same spot, and it was while there that they were seen by a Mr Frencham, he said in November. She confirmed that they had been panning for gold (also called washing) with a milk dish, and had been using a quart-pot and a stocking as storage vessels.

In the evidence that Margaret Kennedy gave before the Select Committee in September 1890, Margaret Kennedy claimed that she and Mrs Farrell had been secretly panning for gold before Henry Frencham arrived, evidence that was substantiated by others. The Select Committee found "that Henry Frencham's claim to be the discoverer of gold at Bendigo has not been sustained", but could not make a decision as to whom of the other at least 12 claimants had been first as "it would be most difficult, if not impossible, to decide that question now"..."at this distance of time from the eventful discovery of gold at Bendigo".

They concluded that there was "no doubt that Mrs Kennedy and Mrs Farrell had obtained gold before Henry Frencham arrived on the Bendigo Creek", but that Frencham "was the first to report the discovery of payable gold at Bendigo to the Commissioner at Forest Creek (Castlemaine)". An event Frencham dated to 28 November 1851, a date which was, according to Frencham's own contemporaneous writings, after a number of diggers had already begun prospecting on the Bendigo goldfield.

28 November 1851 was the date on which Frencham had a letter delivered to Chief Commissioner Wright at Forest Creek (Castlemaine) asking for police protection at Bendigo Creek, a request that officially disclosed the new gold-field. Protection was granted and the Assistant Commissioner of Crown Lands for the Gold Districts of Buninyong and Mt Alexander, Captain Robert Wintle Home, arrived with three black troopers (native police) to set up camp at Bendigo Creek on 8 December.

In the end, the Select Committee also decided "that the first place at which gold was discovered on Bendigo was at what is now known as Golden Square, called by the station hands in 1851 "The Rocks", a point about 200 metres/yards to the west of the junction of Golden Gully with the Bendigo Creek." (The straight-line distance is nearer to 650 yards [590 metres].) In October 1893, Alfred Shrapnell Bailes (1849–1928), the man who had proposed the Select Committee, who was one of the men who had sat on the Select Committee, and who was chairman of the Select Committee for 6 of the 7 days that it sat, gave an address in Bendigo where he gave his opinion on the matter of who had first found gold at Bendigo. Alfred Shrapnell Bailes, Mayor of Bendigo 1883–84, and member of the Legislative Council of Victoria 1886–1894 & 1897–1907, stated that:

...upon the whole, from evidence which, read with the stations books, can be fairly easily pieced together, it would seem that Asquith, Graham, Johnson and Bannister [the three shepherds residing at the hut on Bendigo Creek and their shepherd visitor Johnson], were the first to discover gold

The first group of people digging for gold at the Bendigo Creek in 1851 were people associated with the Mount Alexander North (Ravenswood) Run. They included, in no particular order:

- The shepherd/overseer John "Happy Jack" Kennedy (c. 1816–1883), his wife Margaret Kennedy née Mcphee (1822–1905), and her son 9-year-old John Drane (1841–1914). They also had with them Margaret's 3 younger daughters, (Note: BENDIGO: The evidence of Joshua Norris to the Select Committee of 1890 mentioned Margaret's 4 children. The children were also mentioned, but not their number, by other witnesses. The death registrations of Margaret Kennedy in 1905 and her husband John Kennedy in 1883, by the ages then given for their children, suggest that Margaret only had 3 children in 1851, but this is not supported by an additional two pieces of documentary evidence: (1) a newspaper article in "The Argus", 1941 (reference follows) where Mary Jane was interviewed and gave her age at the time that her mother found gold (late 1851) as being 2 years of age, and not 1 year of age as suggested by her parents' death registrations; and, (2) the Victorian birth registration #42857 for their daughter Lucy Kennedy for 1852 (in the name of Lucy Kenny[sic]) which is a record of her baptism on 19 April 1852 and records her date of birth as 9 March 1851 (and gives her father's occupation as overseer), again disagreeing with the ages shown on her parents' death registrations that suggest that she was born in 1852.) Mary Ann Drane (1844–1919), 7; Mary Jane Kennedy (1849–1948), 2; and baby Lucy Kennedy (1851–1926);
- The cooper Patrick Peter Farrell (c. 1830–1905) and his wife Mrs Farrell; and
- The shepherds employed at the Bendigo Creek, Christian Asquith (c. 1799–1857), James Graham (alias Ben Hall) and Bannister. They were to be joined by others who had been employed elsewhere on the Mount Alexander North (Ravenswood) Run than at Bendigo Creek, including cook/shepherd William Johnson (c. 1827–?), and shepherds James Lister, William Ross, Paddy O'Donnell, William Sandbach (c. 1820–1895) and his brother, Walter Roberts Sandbach (c. 1822–1905), who arrived at the Bendigo Creek to prospect in late November 1851.

They were soon joined by miners from the Forest Creek (Castlemaine) diggings including the journalist Henry Frencham (1816–1897).

There is no doubt that Henry Frencham, under the pen-name of "Bendigo", was the first to publicly write anything about gold-mining at Bendigo Creek, with a report about a meeting of miners at Bendigo Creek on 8 and 9 December 1851, published respectively in the Daily News, Melbourne, date unknown and 13 December 1851 editions of the Geelong Advertiser and The Argus. It was Frencham's words, published in The Argus of 13 December 1851, that were to begin the Bendigo gold rush: "As regards the success of the diggers, it is tolerably certain the majority are doing well, and few making less than half an ounce per man per day."

In late November 1851, some of the miners at Castlemaine (Forest Creek), having heard of the new discovery of gold, began to move to Bendigo Creek joining those from the Mount Alexander North (Ravenswood) Run who were already prospecting there. The beginnings of this gold-mining was reported from the field by Henry Frencham, under the pen-name of "Bendigo", who stated that the new field at Bendigo Creek, which was at first treated as if it were an extension of the Mount Alexander or Forest Creek (Castlemaine) rush, was already about two weeks old on 8 December 1851. Frencham reported then about 250 miners on the field (not counting hut-keepers). On 13 December Henry Frencham's article in The Argus was published announcing to the world that gold was abundant in Bendigo. Just days later, in mid-December 1851 the rush to Bendigo had begun, with a correspondent from Castlemaine for the Geelong Advertiser reported on 16 December 1851 that "hundreds are on the wing thither (to Bendigo Creek)".

Henry Frencham may not have been the first person to find gold at Bendigo, but he was the first person to announce to the authorities (28 November 1851) and then the world (via The Argus, 13 December 1851) the existence of the Bendigo goldfield. He was also the first person to deliver a quantity of payable gold from the Bendigo goldfield to the authorities when, on 28 December 1851—3 days after the 603 men, women, and children then working the Bendigo goldfield had pooled their food resources for a combined Christmas dinner—Frencham and his partner Robert Atkinson, with Trooper Synott as an escort, delivered 14 kilograms (30 lb) of gold that they had mined to Assistant Commissioner Charles J. P. Lydiard at Forest Creek (Castlemaine), the first gold received from Bendigo.

=== Sep–Dec 1851: Other finds in New South Wales ===
- Araluen, September 1851 [Araluen & Bells Creek]
- Braidwood, October 1851 [Majors Creek]
- Bell's Point on the Bell River, November 1851
- Tuena, November 1851

=== 1851 (undated): Other finds in New South Wales ===
- Near Lake George [Carraway Flat & Black Swamp]
- Parshish (80 km south of Bathurst)
- Oakey Creek near Coolah
- Monaro
- Hanging Rock, near Nundle (northern tablelands)

=== 1851 (undated): Other finds in Victoria ===
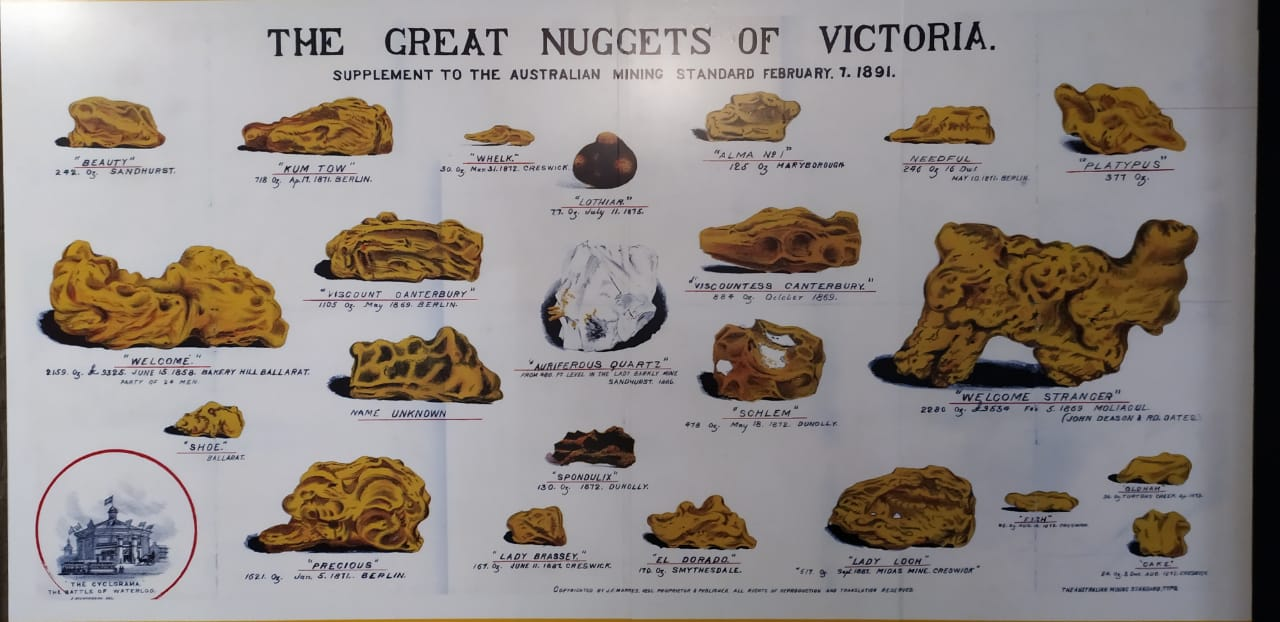
A chart showing the Great Nuggets of Victoria at Museums Victoria

Gold was found at Omeo in late 1851 and gold mining continued in the area for many years. Due to the inaccessibility of the area there was only a small Omeo gold rush.

=== 1851–1886: Managa and other finds in Tasmania ===
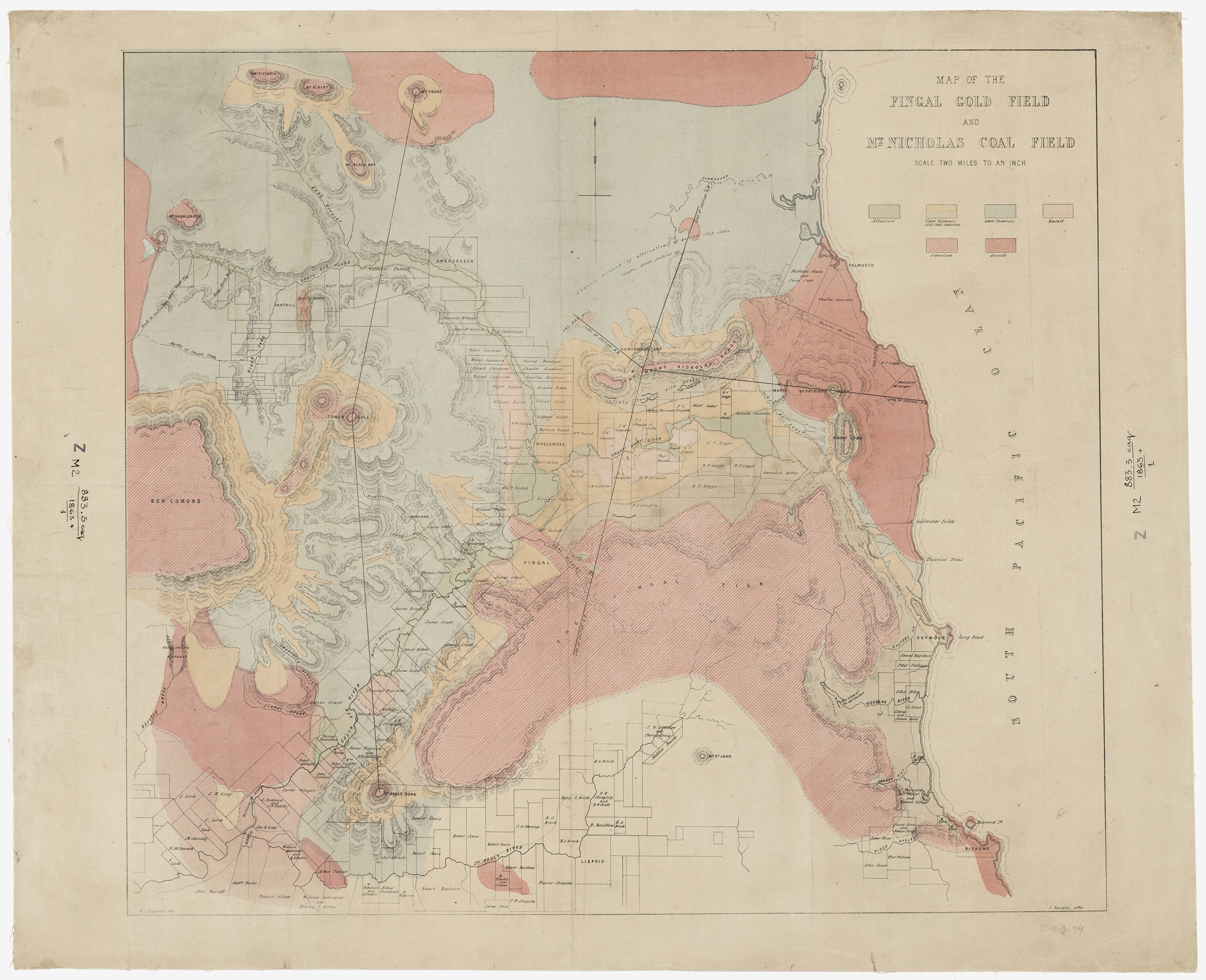
Map of the Fingal gold field, Tasmania, c. 1863

Woods Almanac, 1857, states that gold was possibly found at Fingal (near Mangana) in 1851 by the "Old Major" who steadily worked at a gully for two to three years while guarding his secret. This gold find was probably at Mangana and that there is a gully there known as Major's Gully. The first payable alluvial gold deposits were reported in Tasmania in 1852 by James Grant at Managa (then known as The Nook) and Tower Hill Creek which began the Tasmanian gold rushes. The first registered gold strike was made by Charles Gould at Tullochgoram near Fingal and Managa and weighed 2 lb 6 oz (1,077 g). Further small finds were reported during the same year in the vicinity of Nine Mile Springs (Lefroy). In 1854, gold was found at Mt. Mary.

During 1859, the first quartz mine started operations at Fingal. In the same year James Smith found gold at the River Forth, and Mr. Peter Leete at the Calder, a tributary of the Inglis. Gold was discovered in 1869 at Nine Mile Springs (Lefroy) by Samuel Richards. The news of this brought the first big rush to Nine Mile Springs. A township quickly developed beside the present main road from Bell Bay to Bridport, and dozens of miners pegged out claims there and at nearby Back Creek. The first recorded returns from the Mangana goldfields date from 1870; Waterhouse, 1871; Hellyer, Denison, and Brandy Creek, 1872; Lisle, 1878 Gladstone and Cam, 1881; Minnow and River Forth, 1882; Brauxholme and Mount Victoria, 1883; and Mount Lyell, 1886.

=== 1852 and 1868: Echunga, South Australia ===
Payable gold was found in May 1852 at Echunga in the Adelaide Hills in South Australia by William Chapman and his mates Thomas Hardiman and Henry Hampton. After returning to his father's farm from the Victorian goldfields, William Chapman had searched the area around Echunga for gold motivated by his mining experience and the £1,000 reward (equivalent to A$349,000 in 2022) being offered by the South Australian government for the first discoverer of payable gold. Chapman, Hardiman and Hampton were later to receive £500 of this reward, as the required £10,000 (equivalent to $3.49 million in 2022) of gold had not been raised in two months.

Within a few days of the announcement of finding gold, 80 gold licenses had been issued. Within seven weeks, there were about 600 people, including women and children, camped in tents and wattle-and-daub huts in "Chapman's Gully". A township sprang up in the area as the population grew. Soon there were blacksmiths, butchers and bakers to provide the gold diggers' needs. Within 6 months, 684 licences had been issued. Three police constables were appointed to maintain order and to assist the Gold Commissioner.

By August 1852, there were less than 100 gold diggers and the police presence was reduced to two troopers. The gold rush was at its peak for nine months. It was estimated in May 1853 that about £18,000 (equivalent to $5.55 million in 2022) worth of gold, more than 113 kg (4,000 oz, 250 lb), had been sold in Adelaide between September 1852 and January 1853, with an additional unknown value sent overseas to England.

Despite the sales of gold from Echunga, this goldfield could not compete with the richer fields in Victoria and by 1853 the South Australian goldfields were described as being 'pretty deserted'. There were further discoveries of gold in the Echunga area made in 1853, 1854, 1855, and 1858 causing minor rushes. There was a major revival of the Echunga fields in 1868 when Thomas Plane and Henry Saunders found gold at Jupiter Creek. Plane and Saunders were to receive rewards of £300 (equivalent to A$93,000 in 2022) and £200 (equivalent to A$62,000 in 2022), respectively.

By September 1868, there were about 1,200 people living at the new diggings and tents and huts were scattered throughout the scrub. A township was established with general stores, butchers and refreshment booths. By the end of 1868 though, the alluvial deposits at Echunga were almost exhausted and the population dwindled to several hundred. During 1869 reef mining was introduced and some small mining companies were established but all had gone into liquidation by 1871.

The Echunga goldfields were South Australia's most productive. By 1900, the estimated gold production was 6,000 kg (13,000 lb), compared with 680 g (24 oz), 1½lb) from the Victoria Mine at Castambul. After the revival of the Echunga goldfields in 1868, prospectors searched the Adelaide Hills for new goldfields. News of a new discovery would set off another rush. Gold was found at many locations, including Balhannah, Forest Range, Birdwood, Para Wirra, Mount Pleasant and Woodside.

=== 1852–1869: Other finds in Victoria ===
- Amherst/Daisy Hill/Talbot, 1852 (after initial finds in 1848 and 1851)
- Beechworth, 1852
- Tarnagulla, 1852
- Wedderburn, 1852
- Steiglitz, 1853
- Maldon, 1853
- Homebush near Avoca, 1853
- Bright, 1853
- Stawell, 1853
- Maryborough, 1854
- St Arnaud, 1854
- Caldonia (St Andrews), 1855
- Ararat,1856
- Mansfield, 1855
- Chiltern, 1858
- Inglewood, 1859
- Rutherglen, 1860
- Stuart Mill, 1861
- Walhalla, 1863
- Foster, 1869

=== 1852–1896: Other finds in New South Wales ===
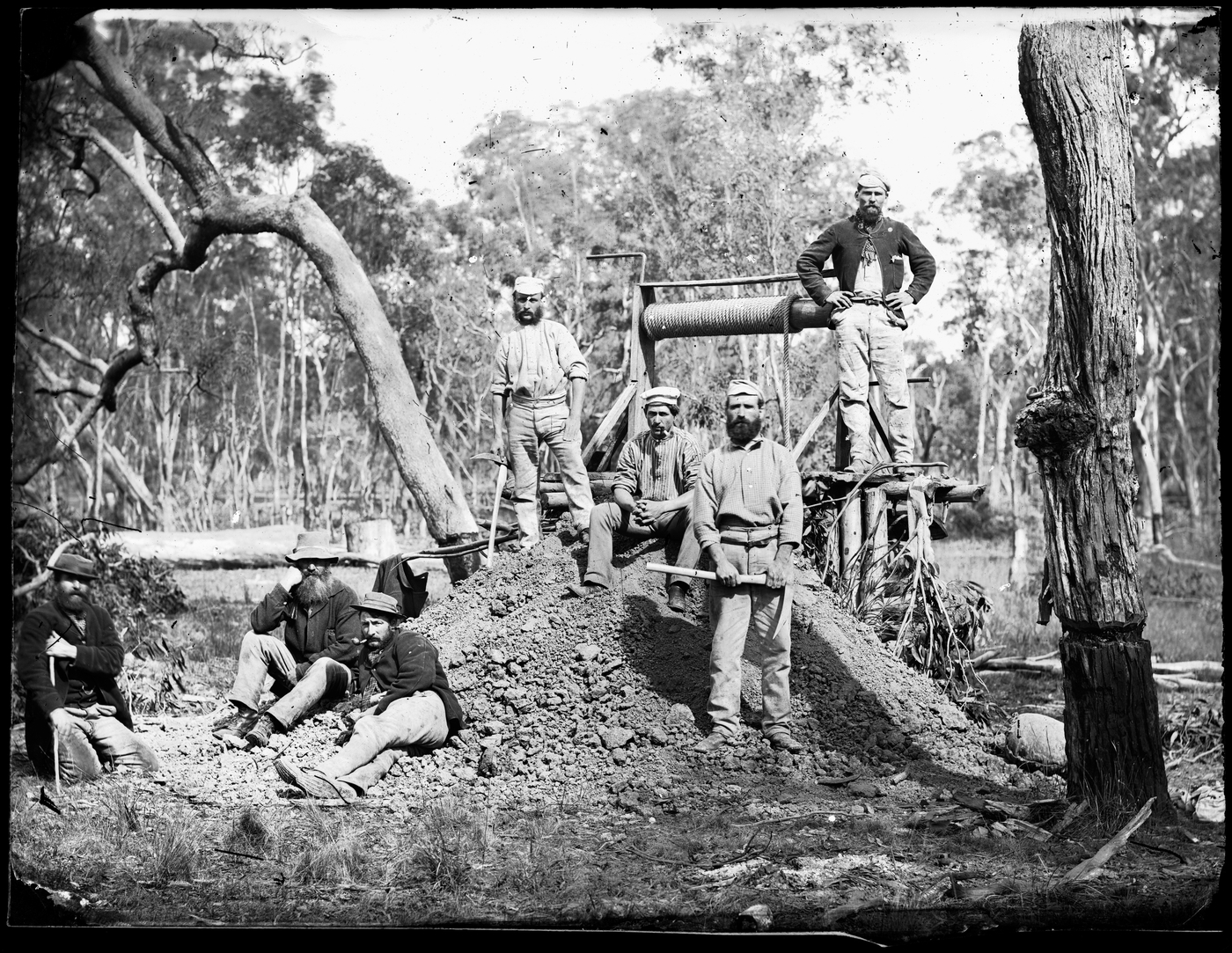
Minehead, goldfields Gulgong, New South Wales, 1872–1873, attributed to Henry Beaufoy Merlin

- Adelong, 1852
- Sunny Corner, 1854
- Rocky River near Uralla, 1856
- Broulee, 1857, on the Araluen Field
- Mogo, 1858, on the Araluen Field
- Kiandra, 1859
- Young, 1860, known at that time as Lambing Flat
- Nerrigundah 1861
- Forbes, 1861
- Parkes, 1862
- Lucknow near Orange, 1862
- Grenfell 1866
- In beach sands at Northern Rivers, 1870
- Gulgong, 1870
- Hillgrove, 1877
- Mount McDonald near Wyangala, 1880
- Wrightville, near Cobar, 1887
- Mount Drysdale near Cobar, 1892
- Wyalong, 1893
- Canbelego, near Cobar, 1896

=== 1857/8: Canoona near Rockhampton, Queensland ===
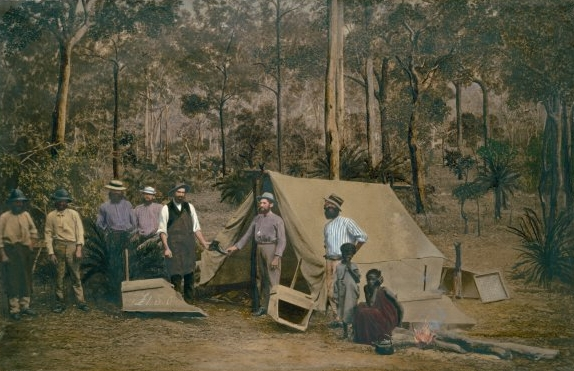
Overpainted albumen print of gold diggers and Aborigines near Rockhampton c. 1860s

Gold was found in Queensland near Warwick as early as 1851, beginning small-scale alluvial gold mining in that state.

The first Queensland gold rush did not occur until late 1858, however, after the discovery of what was rumoured to be payable gold for a large number of men at Canoona near what was to become the town of Rockhampton. According to legend, this gold was found at Canoona near Rockhampton by a man named Chappie (or Chapel) in July or August 1858.

The gold in the area had first been found north of the Fitzroy River on 17 November 1857 by Captain (later Sir) Maurice Charles O'Connell, a grandson of William Bligh, a former governor of New South Wales, who was Government Resident at Gladstone. Initially worried that his find would be exaggerated, O'Connell wrote to the Chief Commissioner of Crown Lands on 25 November 1857 to inform him that he had found "very promising prospects of gold" after having some pans of earth washed.

Chapel was a flamboyant and extroverted character who, in 1858 at the height of the gold rush, claimed to have first found the gold. Instead, Chapel had been employed by O'Connell as part of a prospecting party to follow up on O'Connell's initial gold find, a prospecting party which, according to contemporary local pastoralist Colin Archer, "after pottering about for some six months or more, did discover a gold-field near Canoona, yielding gold in paying quantities for a limited number of men". O'Connell was in Sydney in July 1858 when he reported to the Government the success of the measures he had initiated for the development of the goldfield which he had discovered.

This first Queensland gold rush resulted in about 15,000 people flocking to this sparsely populated area in the last months of 1858. This was, however, a small goldfield with only shallow gold deposits and with nowhere near enough gold to sustain the large number of prospectors. This gold rush was given the name of the 'duffer rush' as destitute prospectors "had, in the end, to be rescued by their colonial governments or given charitable treatment by shipping companies" to return home when they did not strike it rich and had used up all their capital.

The authorities had expected violence to break out and had supplied contingents of mounted and foot police as well as warships. The New South Wales government (Queensland was then part of New South Wales) sent up the "Iris" which remained in Keppel Bay during November to preserve the peace. The Victorian government sent up the "Victoria" with orders to the captain to bring back all Victorian diggers unable to pay their fares; they were to work out their passage money on return to Melbourne.

O'Connell had reported that "we have had some trying moments when it seemed as if the weight of a feather would have turned the balance between comparative order and scenes of great violence". According to legend, both O'Connel and Chapel were threatened with lynching.

=== 1861–1866: Cape River and other finds in Queensland ===
In late 1861, the Clermont goldfield was discovered in Central Queensland near Peak Downs, triggering what has (incorrectly) been described as one of Queensland's major gold rushes. Mining extended over a large area, but only a small number of miners was involved. Newspapers of the day, which also warned against a repeat of the Canoona experience of 1858, at the same time as describing lucrative gold-finds reveal that this was only a small gold rush. The Rockhampton Bulletin and Central Queensland Advertiser of 3 May 1862 reported that "a few men have managed to earn a subsistence for some months...others have gone there and returned unsuccessful".

The Courier (Brisbane) of 5 January 1863 describes "40 miners on the diggings at present ... and in the course of a few months there will probably be several hundred miners at work". The Courier reported 200 diggers at Peak Downs in July 1863. The goldfield covering an area of over 1,600 square miles (4,100 km^{2}) was officially declared in August 1863. The Cornwall Chronicle (Launceston, Tasmania), citing the Ballarat Star, reported about 300 men at work, many of them new chums, in October 1863.

In 1862, gold was found at Calliope near Gladstone, with the goldfield being officially proclaimed in the next year. The small rush attracted around 800 people by 1864 and after that the population declined as by 1870 the gold deposits were worked out.

In 1863, gold was also found at Canal Creek (Leyburn) and some gold-mining began there at that time, but the short-lived gold rush there did not occur until 1871–72.

In 1865, Richard Daintree discovered 100 km (62 mi) south-west of Charters Towers the Cape River goldfield near Pentland in North Queensland. The Cape River Goldfield which covered an area of over 300 square miles (780 km^{2}) was not, however, proclaimed until 4 September 1867, and by the next year the best of the alluvial gold had petered out. This gold rush attracted Chinese diggers to Queensland for the first time. The Chinese miners at Cape River moved to Richard Daintree's newly discovered Oaks Goldfield on the Gilbert River in 1869.

The Crocodile Creek (Bouldercombe Gorge) field near Rockhampton was also discovered in 1865. By August 1866 it was reported that there were between 800 and 1,000 men on the field. A new rush took place in March 1867. By 1868 the best of the alluvial gold had petered out. The enterprising Chinese diggers who arrived in the area, however, were still able to make a success of their gold-mining endeavours.

Gold was also found at Morinish near Rockhampton in 1866 with miners working in the area by December 1866, and a "new rush" being described in the newspapers in February 1867 with the population being estimated on the field as 600.

=== 1867–1870: Gympie and other finds in Queensland ===
Queensland had plunged into an economic crisis after the separation of Queensland from New South Wales in 1859. This had led to severe unemployment with a peak in 1866. Gold was being mined in the state but the number of men involved was only small. On 8 January 1867, the Queensland Government offered a £3,000 (equivalent to A$952,000 in 2022) reward for the discovery of more payable goldfields in the state. As a direct result, 1867 saw new gold rushes.

More goldfields were discovered near Rockhampton in early 1867 being Ridgelands and Rosewood. The rush to Rosewood was described in May 1867 as having "over three hundred miners". Ridgelands with its few hundred miners was described as "the most populous gold-field in the colony" on 5 October 1867, but it was very soon overtaken and far surpassed by Gympie.

The most important discovery in 1867 was later in the year when James Nash discovered gold at Gympie, with the rush under way by November 1867.

J. A. Lewis, Inspector of Police arrived on the Gympie goldfield on 3 November 1867 and wrote on 11 November 1867:

On reaching the diggings I found a population numbering about five hundred, the majority of whom were doing little or nothing in the way of digging for the precious metal. Claims, however, were marked out in all directions, and the ground leading from the gullies where the richest finds have been got was taken up for a considerable distance. I have very little hesitation in stating that two-thirds of the people congregated there had never been on a diggings before, and seemed to be quite at a loss what to do. Very few of them had tents to live in or tools to work with; and I am afraid that the majority of those had not sufficient money to keep them in food for one week...From all that I could glean from miners and others, with whom I had an opportunity of speaking, respecting the diggings, I think it very probable that a permanent gold-field will be established at, or in the vicinity of, Gympie Creek; and if reports-which were in circulation when I left the diggings-to the effect that several prospecting parties had found gold at different points, varying from one to five miles from the township, be correct, there is little doubt but it will be an extensive gold-field, and will absorb a large population within a very short period.

The very rich and productive area, which covered only an area of 120 square miles (310 km^{2}), was officially declared the Gympie Goldfield in 1868. In 1868 the mining shanty town which had quickly grown with tents, many small stores and liquor outlets, and was known as "Nashville", was also renamed Gympie after the Gympie Creek named from the aboriginal name for a local stinging tree. Within months there were 25,000 people on the goldfield. This was the first large gold rush after Canoona in 1858, and Gympie became 'The Town That Saved Queensland' from bankruptcy.

The Kilkivan Goldfield (N.W of Gympie) was also discovered in 1867 with the rush to that area beginning in that same year, and, as was commonly the case, before the goldfield was officially declared in July 1868.

Townsville was opened up in 1868, the Gilbert River goldfield (110 km from Georgetown) in 1869, and Etheridge (Georgetown) in 1870.

=== 1868: Gawler region, South Australia ===
Gold found about 10 km south-east of Gawler in South Australia in 1868. Gold was found by Job Harris and his partners in Spike Valley near the South Para River. This was unsold Crown Land and was proclaimed an official goldfield with a warden appointed. On the second day there were 40 gold seekers, 1,000 within a week and, within a month, 4,000 licensed and 1,000 unlicensed diggers. Three towns were established nearby with about 6,000 people at their peak.

Alluvial gold was easily recovered when the gold was in high concentration. As the alluvial was worked out, companies were formed to extract the gold from the ore with crushers and a mercury process. By 1870 only 50 people remained, although one of the three towns, Barossa, lasted until the 1950s. South of the Barossa goldfield, the Lady Alice Mine in Hamlin Gully, discovered in 1871 by James Goddard, was the first South Australian gold mine to pay a dividend.

=== 1870–1893: Teetulpa and other finds in South Australia ===
As settlers took up land north of Adelaide, so more goldfields were discovered in South Australia: Ulooloo in 1870, Waukaringa in 1873, Teetulpa in 1886, Wadnaminga in 1888 and Tarcoola in 1893.

Teetulpa, 11 km (6.8 mi) north of Yunta, was a rich goldfield where more gold was found than anywhere else in South Australia at that time. Teetulpa had the largest number of diggers of any field at any time in the history of South Australian gold discoveries. By the end of 1886, two months into the rush, there were more than five thousand men on the field. A reporter noted: "All sorts of people are going – from lawyers to larrikins ... Yesterday's train from Adelaide brought a contingent of over 150 ... Many arrived in open trucks ... Local ironmongers and drapers were busy fitting out intending diggers with tents, picks, shovels, rugs, moleskins, etc." Good mining at Teetulpa lasted about ten years. For a time, it had a bank, shops, hotel, hospital, church and a newspaper. The largest nugget found weighed 30 oz (850 g).

=== 1871–1904: Charters Towers, Palmer River, and other finds in Queensland ===
A significant Queensland goldfield was discovered at Charters Towers on 24 December 1871 by a young 12-year-old Aboriginal stockman, Jupiter Mosman, and soon moved attention to this area. The gold rush which followed has been argued to be the most important in Queensland's gold-mining history. This was a reef-mining area with only a small amount of alluvial gold, and as a result received negative reviews from miners who wanted easier pickings. Nevertheless thousands of men rushed to the field, and a public battery was set up to crush the quartz ore in 1872. The town of Charters Towers grew to become the second largest town in Queensland during the late 1880s with a population of about 30,000.

In 1872 gold was discovered by James Mulligan on the Palmer River inland from Cooktown. This turned out to contain Queensland's richest alluvial deposits. After the rush began in 1873 over 20,000 people made their way to the remote goldfield. This was one of the largest rushes experienced in Queensland. The rush lasted approximately 3 years and attracted a large number of Chinese. In 1877 over 18,000 of the residents were Chinese miners.

Port Douglas dates from 1873, and the Hodgkinson river (west of Cairns) from 1875.

The celebrated Mount Morgan was first worked in 1882, Croydon in 1886, the Starcke river goldfield near the coast 70 km (43 mi) north of Cooktown in 1890, Coen in 1900, and Alice River in 1904.

=== 1871–1909: Pine Creek and other finds in the Northern Territory ===
Darwin felt the effects of a gold rush at Pine Creek after employees of the Australian Overland Telegraph Line found gold while digging holes for telegraph poles in 1871:

There are numerous deposits of the precious metal at various localities in the Northern Territory, the total yield in 1908 being 8,575 ounces (243.1 kg), valued at £27,512 (equivalent to A$8,400,000 in 2022), of which 1,021 ounces (28.9 kg) were obtained at the Driffield. In June 1909, a rich find of gold was reported from Tanami... Steps are being taken to open up this field by sinking wells to provide permanent water, of which there is a great scarcity in the district. A large number of Chinese are engaged in mining in the Territory. In 1908, out of a total of 824 miners employed, the Chinese numbered 674.

=== 1880: Mt McDonald, New South Wales ===
Donald McDonald and his party discovered two gold-rich quartz reefs at Mount McDonald, as they were prospecting the mountain ranges around Wyangala. This find resulted in the establishment of the township of Mt McDonald. By the early 1900s, mining declined, and the town slowly faded away.

=== 1885: Halls Creek in the Kimberley, Western Australia ===
In 1872, the Western Australian Government offered a reward of £5,000 (equivalent to A$1,710,000 in 2022) for the discovery of the colony's first payable goldfield.

Ten years later, in 1882, small finds of gold were being made in the Kimberley region of Western Australia, prompting in 1883 the appointment of a Government Geologist. In 1884, Edward Hardman, Government Geologist, published a report that he had found traces of gold throughout the east Kimberley, especially in the area around the present-day town of Halls Creek.

On 14 July 1885, having been prompted by Hardman's report, Charles Hall and Jack Slattery found payable gold at what they called Halls Creek, in the Kimberleys, Western Australia. After working for a few weeks, Hall returned to Derby with 6.2 kg (200 ozt) of gold and reported his find. Once this discovery became known it prompted the Kimberley Rush, the first gold rush in Western Australia. It is estimated that as many as 10,000 men joined the rush. On 19 May 1886, the Kimberley Goldfield was officially declared:

Thousands of men made their way to the Kimberley from other parts of WA, the eastern colonies, and New Zealand. Most arrived by ship in Derby or Wyndham, and then walked to Halls Creek. Others came overland from the Northern Territory. Most had no previous experience in gold prospecting or of life in the bush. Illness and disease were rife, and when the first warden, C. D. Price, arrived on 3 September 1886, he found that "great numbers were stricken down, in a dying condition, helpless, destitute of money, food, or covering, and without mates or friends simply lying down to die". A few were lucky enough to locate rich alluvial or reef gold, but most had little or no success.

In the early days of the gold rush no records or statistics were recorded for either the arrivals or deaths. Also, no-one knows how many died trying to get to Halls Creek across the waterless desert, or how many simply turned back. When men actually arrived at Halls Creek, dysentery, scurvy, sunstroke and thirst continued to take its toll. The Government applied a gold tax of two shillings and sixpence an ounce. It was a very unpopular levy as gold proved so hard to get. The diggers avoided registering and the Government had a great deal of trouble collecting the tax or statistics of any kind.

When C. D. Price arrived in September 1886, he reported that about 2,000 remained at the diggings. By the end of 1886, the rush had ceased. When in May 1888 the government considered claims for the reward for discovery of the first payable goldfield, it was decided that the Kimberley goldfield, which had proven disappointing, was insufficient to meet the stipulated conditions of a yield of at least 10,000 troy ounces (310 kg) of gold in a 2-year period passing through Customs or shipped to England, so no reward was paid out. (It is estimated that as much as 23,000 troy ounces [720 kg] of gold was taken from the fields around Halls Creek, but with much leaving the field through the Northern Territory.) Hardman's contribution was recognised, however, with a gift of £500 (equivalent to A$80,000 in 2022) to his widow Louisa Hardman. Another £500 was given to Charles Hall and his party.

=== 1887–1891: Southern Cross, the Pilbara, and other finds in Western Australia ===
==== 1887 The Yilgarn and 1888 Southern Cross ====
1887 saw the first discovery of gold in what was to be the huge Eastern Goldfields region. Gold-bearing quartz was found near Lake Deborah in the Yilgarn Hills north of what was to become the town of Southern Cross in October 1887 by the party of Harry Francis Anstey. Anstey and his party were prospecting in the area after having heard that a farmer had found a gold nugget in the Yilgarn while sinking a bore. Others in his party were Dick Greaves and Ted Paine, with Ted Paine being the first to see the gold. As a result of this find Anstey and one of his backers George Leake, the then Solicitor-General and future Premier of Western Australia, were in November 1887 granted a 24,000 ha (60,000 acres) mining concession for prospecting purposes.

On 30 December 1887, after hearing directly from Anstey of the success of his party, Bernard Norbert Colreavy also discovered a gold-bearing quartz reef in the Golden Valley in the Yilgarn Hills, and on 12 January 1888 Colreavy's fellow party member, H.Huggins, discovered another gold-bearing quartz reef. They soon found and secured another seven more gold-bearing quartz reefs.

In May 1888 Michael Toomey and Samuel Faulkner were the first to discover gold-bearing quartz at the site of what became the town of Southern Cross on the Yilgarn Goldfield, about 50 km (31 mi) south-east of the Golden Valley. Party leader Thomas Riseley subsequently crushed and panned the samples that had been taken which confirmed that they had found gold, and Riseley and Toomey then proceeding to peg out their claim on behalf of the Phoenix Prospecting Company.

On the news of Anstey's find the Yilgarn Rush had begun in late 1887. The excitement of the gold rush intensified in early 1888 with the news of the discovery of Golden Valley (named for the Golden Wattle that grows there) by Colreavy and Huggins, and further intensified just a few months later with the news of the discovery of Riseley, Toomey and Faulkner, but the goldfield was not officially proclaimed until 1 October 1888. In 1892, the Government awarded Anstey £500 (equivalent to A$162,000 in 2022), and Colreavy and Huggins £250 (equivalent to A$81,000 in 2022) each, for the discovery of the Yilgarn goldfields. The Yilgarn Rush died out when news arrived of the rich discovery of gold to the east at Coolgardie in September 1892.

==== 1888: The Pilbara ====
The Pilbara Goldfield was officially declared on the same day as the Yilgarn Goldfield, 1 October 1888. The government had offered £1,000 (equivalent to A$321,000 in 2022) reward for the first person to find payable gold in the Pilbara. This was shared by three men: explorers Francis Gregory and N. W. Cook, and pastoralist John Withnell. Gregory also discovered gold in a region known as Nullagine Proper in June 1888, and Harry Wells found gold in Marble Bar. As a result, the Pilbara Goldfield, which covered an area of 34,880 square miles (90,300 km^{2}), was divided into two districts, Nullagine and Marble Bar. To support the Pilbara Rush, the government developed a railway line between Marble Bar and Port Hedland in 1891. Alluvial gold production started to decline in 1895, after which mining companies commenced deep-shaft mining.

==== 1891: Cue ====
Gold was found at Cue in 1891 by Michael Fitzgerald, Edward Heffernan and Tom Cue. This became known as the Murchison Rush.

=== 1892–1899: Coolgardie, Kalgoorlie, and other finds in Western Australia ===
==== 1892: Coolgardie ====
In September 1892, gold was found at Fly Flat (Coolgardie) by Arthur Wesley Bayley and William Ford, who next to a quartz-reef obtaining 17.2 kilograms (554 ozt) of gold in one afternoon with the aid of a tomahawk. On 17 September 1892 Wesley rode the 185 km (115 mi) with this gold into Southern Cross to register their reward-claim for a new find of gold. Within hours had started what was at first called the Gnarlbine Rush. Overnight the miners who were flocked on the Southern Cross diggings moved to the more lucrative Coolgardie Goldfield. The reward-claim for Bayley's party for discovering the new goldfield was to be granted a 30 m (100 ft) deep claim along the line of reef. This claim was said to cover an area of five acres (2.0 hectares). On 24 August 1893, less than a year after Arthur Bayley and William Ford's discovery of gold at Fly Flat, Coolgardie was declared a town site, with an estimated population of 4,000 (with many more mining out in the field).

The Coolgardie gold rush was the beginning of what has been described as "the greatest gold rush in West Australian history". It has also been described as "the greatest movement of people in Australia's history", but this is an exaggeration. The greatest movement of people in Australia's history was in the period 1851 to 1861 during the gold rushes to the Eastern states when the recorded population of Australia rose by 730,484 from 437,665 in 1851 to 1,168,149 in 1861, as against an increase of 20% of this amount for Western Australia in the period 1891 to 1901, a 137,834 increase of recorded population for Western Australia from 46,290 in 1891 to 184,124 in 1901.

==== 1893: Kalgoorlie ====
On 17 June 1893, alluvial gold was found near Mount Charlotte, less than 25 miles (40 km) from Coolgardie, at what became the town of Hannan (Kalgoorlie). The announcement of this find by Paddy Hannan only intensified the excitement of the Coolgardie gold-rush, and led to the establishment in Western Australia's Eastern Goldfields of the twin towns of Kalgoorlie–Boulder. Prior to moving to Western Australia in 1889 to prospect for gold Hannan had prospected at Ballarat in Victoria in the 1860s, Otago in New Zealand in the 1870s, and at Teetulpa (north of Yunta) in South Australia in 1886. The first to find gold at Kalgoorlie were Paddy Hannan and his fellow Irishmen Thomas Flanagan and Daniel Shea:

In the morning Flanagan was fetching the horses when he spotted gold on the ground. As others were camping nearby he kicked a bush over it, took careful note of his bearings, and hastened back to tell Hannan and Dan Shea, another Irishman who had joined them. They tarried there until the others had gone, then recovered Flanagan's gold and found much more! It was decided one should go back to Southern Cross, the nearest administrative centre, with the gold and seek a reward-claim from the Warden. Tess Thomson in her book Paddy Hannan, A Claim To Fame, reveals that it was Hannan who did so. Thus, Flanagan was the 'finder' and Hannan, who made the find public, was the 'discoverer', for "dis-cover" means what it says – "to take the cover off", in other words "to reveal; to make public" which a finder does not necessarily do.

After Hannan registered their reward-claim for a new find of gold with over 100 ounces (2.8 kg) of alluvial gold, an estimated 700 men were prospecting in the area within three days. The reward for Hannan's party for discovering the best alluvial find ever made in the colony, and without knowing it one of the best reefing fields in the world, was to be granted a six acres (2.4 hectares) mining lease.

==== 1893: Greenough River ====
Gold was found at Noondamurra Pool on the Greenough River, between Yuna and Mullewa in August 1893 causing a small rush to that area.

==== 1893–1899: Coolgardie and Kalgoorlie ====
Other rich fields were found in the area around Coolgardie and Kalgoorlie in the period 1893–1899.

The population of Coolgardie is estimated to have reached 15,000 at its peak during the gold rush, and the town boasted over 26 pubs supplied by 3 breweries, 2 stock exchanges, 14 churches, 6 newspapers, and a courthouse. The population of Kalgoorlie–Boulder is estimated to have reached 30,000 at its initial peak during the gold rush with over 93 pubs supplied by 8 breweries, a stock exchange, churches, newspapers, and a courthouse. It took more than a century for the population to surpass its gold-frenzied peak when it reached 32,966 in 2013 before declining to 29,068 in August 2021.

In 1897, Coolgardie was the third largest town in Western Australia after Perth and Fremantle and the largest town in the Western Australian gold-mining districts, with a recorded population of 5,008, while Kalgoorlie–Boulder was the fourth-largest town in Western Australia and the second largest in the Western Australian gold-mining districts, with an estimated population of 3,400. (Kalgoorlie's recorded population was 2,018, while numbers for Boulder were not recorded. The estimate of 3,400 for Kalgoorlie–Boulder is based on the proportional numbers in Kalgoorlie and Boulder in the 1901 census.) The total estimated population for 1897 for the many settlements in the Coolgardie Magisterial Districts (which included Coolgardie and Kalgoorlie) was 17,645 (14,047 men and 3,598 women). Many more people were not residing in residential areas but were out in the field mining.

The 1901 census gives a greater idea of the population of the area, and the size of the gold rush. By 1901, the population of Kalgoorlie–Boulder Municipality had grown to 11,253 (6,652 Kalgoorlie, 4,601 Boulder) making it at that time the third-largest town in Western Australia after Perth and Fremantle and the largest town in the Western Australian gold-mining districts, while that of Coolgardie Municipality had fallen slightly to 4,249. The total population for the Coolgardie Magisterial Districts (which included Coolgardie and Kalgoorlie–Boulder) was 41,816 men, women and children, being: 8,315 in the Coolgardie Magisterial District centred on Coolgardie; 26,101 in the Coolgardie East Magisterial District centred on Kalgoorlie–Boulder; 4,710 in the Coolgardie North Magisterial District centred on Menzies; and 2,690 in the Coolgardie North-East Magisterial District centred on Kanowna:

The far-reaching nature of the mining excitement (in Western Australia) drew men from all over the world...People immigrated from Africa and America, Great Britain and Europe, China and India, New Zealand and the South Sea Islands, and from mining centres in Queensland, New South Wales, Victoria, Tasmania, and South Australia.

A website managed by the National Trust of Australia (WA) states:

The gold rush transformed the Western Australian economy as gold production soared from 22,806 ounces in 1890 to 1,643,876 ounces in 1900 and this was matched by the fourfold increase in WA's population from 46,290 in 1890 to 184,124 reported in the 1901 census.

=== 1906: Tarnagulla, Victoria ===
Gold was rediscovered near Tarnagulla on 6 November 1906 (Melbourne Cup Day) when a miner who had prospected the district for years obtained seven ounces of gold from a shaft nineteen feet (5.8 metres) deep. With some fairly large nuggets being found soon after, the so-called Poseidon rush, named after the horse that had won the Melbourne Cup that year, set in with "men of all ranks and professions...trying their luck on the field". Several of the nuggets were unearthed within a few inches of the surface. The largest weighed 953 ounces (27.0 kg), and two others weighed 703 (20 kg) and 675 ounces (19.1 kg), respectively. The shallow ground was soon worked out, but operations gave satisfactory results in the deeper alluvial until 1912.

== See also ==
- Eureka Stockade
- Buckland Riot
- Lambing Flat Riots

== Sources and further reading ==
- Bellingham, Robin A., and Aleryk Fricker. "Decolonising Australian Gold Rush Narratives with Critical Geopolitics." Australian Journal of Environmental Education 40.3 (2024): 473–486. online
- Blainey, Geoffrey. "The momentous gold rushes." Australian Economic History Review 50.2 (2010): 209–216 online.
- Blainey, Geoffrey. The rush that never ended: a history of Australian mining (Melbourne Univ. Publishing, 2013).
- Bryceson, Deborah Fahy. "Artisanal gold-rush mining and frontier democracy: Juxtaposing experiences in America, Australia, Africa and Asia." in Between the Plough and the Pick (2018): 31–61. online
- Fetherling, Douglas, and George Fetherling. The gold crusades: a social history of gold rushes, 1849-1929 (University of Toronto Press, 1997).
- Frost, Warwick. "Making an edgier interpretation of the Gold Rushes: contrasting perspectives from Australia and New Zealand." International journal of heritage studies 11.3 (2005): 235–250. online
- Goodman, David. Gold Seeking: Victoria and California in the 1850s (Stanford University Press, 1994) online.
- La Croix, Sumner J. "Property rights and institutional change during Australia's gold rush." Explorations in Economic History 29.2 (1992): 204–227.
- Lawrence, Susan. "Colonisation in the industrial age: The landscape of the Australian gold rush." Industrial archaeology: Future directions (Springer US, 2005) pp.279–298.
- Maddock, Rodney, and Ian McLean. "Supply-side shocks: the case of Australian gold." Journal of Economic History 44.4 (1984): 1047–1067. online
- Monaghan, Jay. Australians and the gold rush: California and down under 1849-1854 (Univ of California Press, 2023) online.
- Ngai, Mae. The Chinese Question: The Gold Rushes and Global Politics (2021), Mid 19c in California, Australia and South Africa
- Reeves, Keir, Lionel Frost, and Charles Fahey. "Integrating the historiography of the nineteenth‐century gold rushes." Australian Economic History Review 50.2 (2010): 111–128. online
- Webb, Martyn; Webb, Audrey (1993). Golden Destiny. WA: City of Kalgoorlie-Boulder. ISBN 0646142542.
