= Esperance Land District =

Coordinates: 33°35′S 121°40′E

Esperance Western Australia
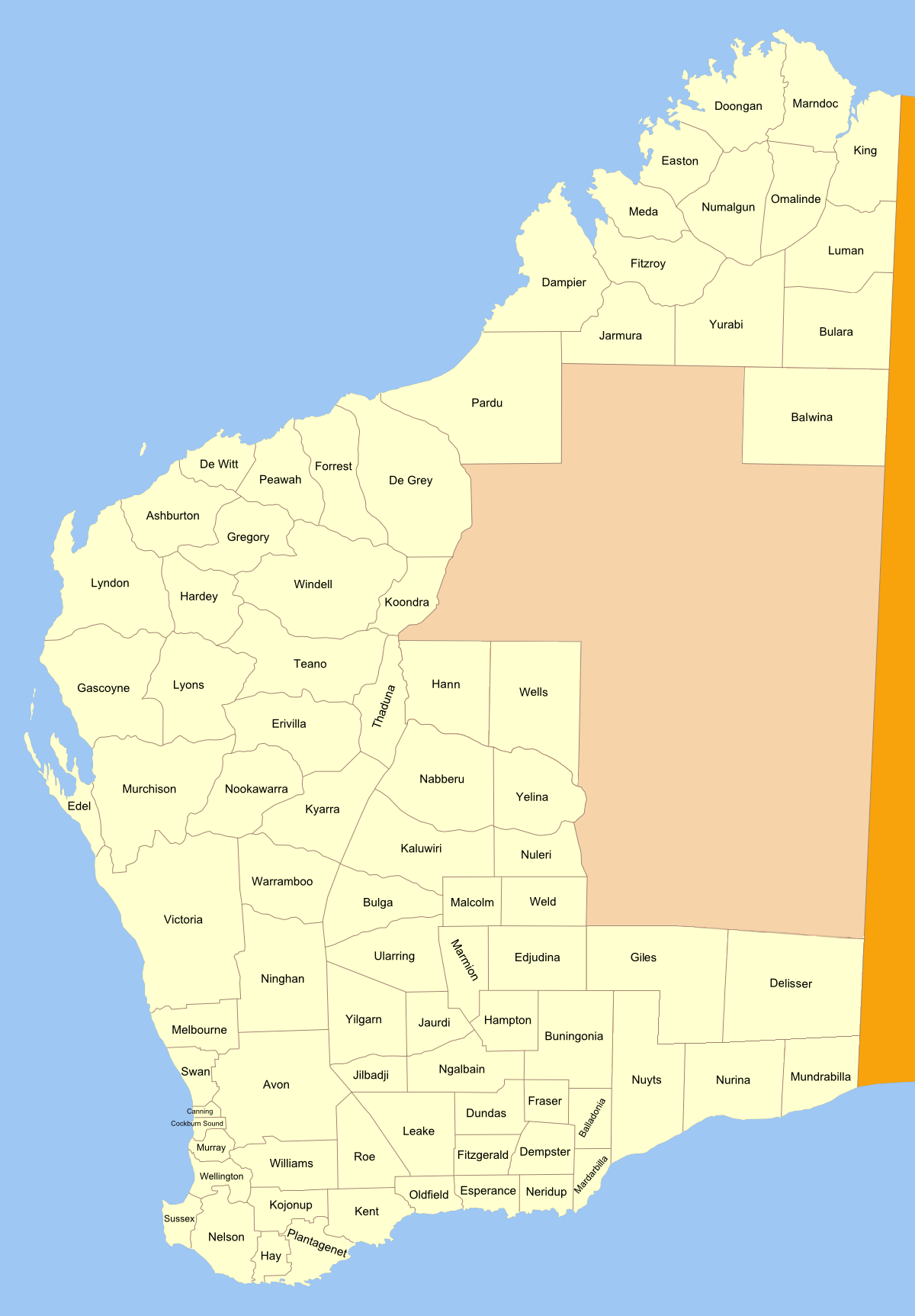
Lands administrative divisions around Esperance:
Leake	Fitzgerald	Dempster
Oldfield	Esperance	Neridup
Southern Ocean	Southern Ocean	Southern Ocean

Esperance Land District is a land district (cadastral division) of Western Australia, located within the Eucla Land Division on the state's south coast. It spans roughly 33°15'S - 34°00'S in latitude and 121°00'E - 122°20'E in longitude.

== Location and features ==
The district is located on the Southern Ocean coast, roughly centred on the town of Esperance and extending west to Young River, east to Rossiter Bay, and north about 65 kilometres (40 mi) inland. It includes the following townsites and areas, with year of gazettal noted:

- Coomalbidgup (1961)
- Dalyup (1962)
- Esperance (1893)
- Gibson (1921)
- Scaddan (1924)
- Shark Lake (1967)
- Dalyup Agricultural Area (1896)
- Doombup Agricultural Area (1898)
- Myrup Agricultural Area (1894)

== History ==
On 20 August 1896, Harry Johnston, the Deputy Surveyor General of Western Australia, recommended that four new districts be created in the Esperance region. On 22 August, the Under Secretary for Lands advised the responsible Minister: "The time has fully arrived for declaring some additional districts along the South coast, and I recommend that Mr Johnston's recommendation be adopted. There is no provision in any Act or Regulations for the declaration of land districts and counties. It is only an office arrangement [...] though in the new Act that is in contemplation, proper provision is made for the declaration of Districts and Counties in a regular manner." The Minister approved the names on 11 September, and on 23 September 1896 the District was added to the Standard Plans in use by the Department of Lands and Surveys. As it was approved prior to the Land Act 1898, its boundaries were never gazetted.
