= Johnstons Creek =

Johnstons Creek may refer to:

- Johnstons Creek (New South Wales), a former creek, now canal, in Sydney, Australia
- Johnston Creek (Alberta), a creek and canyon in Banff National Park, Alberta, Canada

== See also ==
- Johnston River, a river in Western Australia
