= Prospect Creek (Western Australia) =

River in Kimberley region of Western Australia

Coordinates: 17°55.68′S 127°51.65′E

Location
- Country: Australia

Physical characteristics
- Source
  - location: Duffer Range
  - elevation: 420 metres (1,378 ft)
- Mouth
  - location: Armanda River
  - elevation: 331 metres (1,086 ft)
- Length: 19 km (12 mi)

Prospect Creek is a small creek in the Kimberley region in the state of Western Australia. It feeds into the Armanda River near Halls Creek. The headwaters of the creek rise below the Duffer range and flow in a northerly direction, almost parallel with the Great Northern Highway until discharging into the Armanda River, of which it is a tributary.
