= Panton River =

River in Kimberley region of Western Australia

Coordinates: 17°49′16″S 128°15′1″E

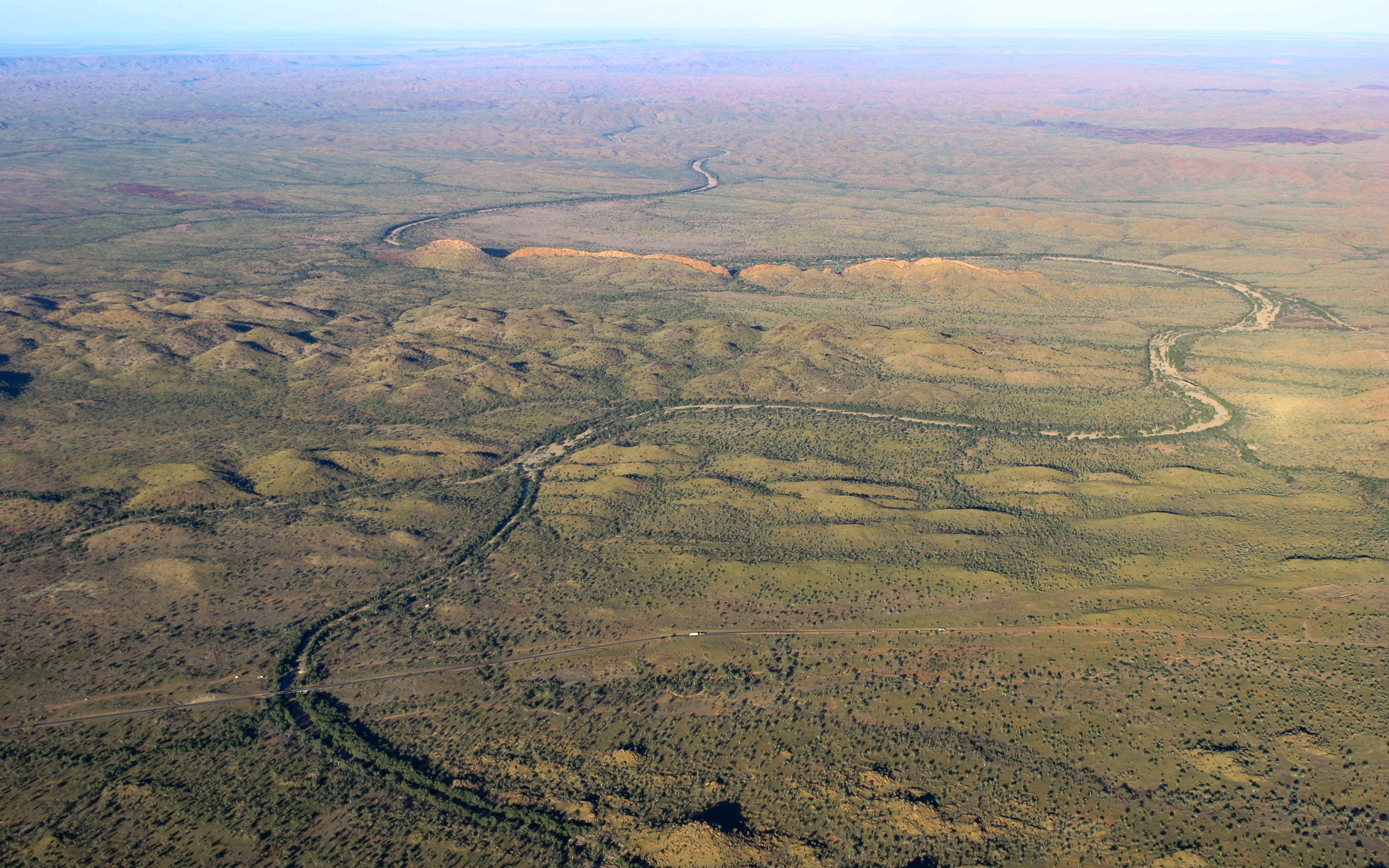

Location
- Country: Australia

Physical characteristics
- Source
  - elevation: 339 metres (1,112 ft)
- Mouth
  - location: Ord River
  - elevation: 175 metres (574 ft)
- Length: 99 km (62 mi)

The Panton River is a river in the Kimberley region of Western Australia.

The river rises below Alice Hill and it flows in an easterly direction before discharging into the Ord River on the southern edge of Purnululu National Park.

The Panton River has seven tributaries; Elvire River, Turner River, Upper Panton River, Little Panton River, Armanda River and Black Duck Creek.
