= Johnston River =

River in Western Australia

Coordinates: 18°19′15″S 128°1′8″E

Location
- Country: Australia

Physical characteristics
- Source
  - elevation: 358 metres (1,175 ft)
- Mouth
  - location: Elvire River
  - elevation: 281 metres (922 ft)
- Length: 46 km (29 mi)

Johnston River is a river in the Kimberley region of Western Australia.

The Johnston River rises on Ruby Plains Station, flows in a northerly direction for 46 km and discharges into the Elvire River in Elvire Gorge to the east of Halls Creek.

The first European to see the Johnston River was the surveyor, Harry Johnston, who surveyed the river in 1884. The river was named after him by another surveyor Charles William Nyulasy, in 1887.

The two tributaries of the Johnston River are Fox River and Duerdin Creek.
