= Armanda River =

River in Kimberley region in Western Australia

Coordinates: 18°1′28″S 127°48′46″E

Location
- Country: Australia

Physical characteristics
- Source
  - elevation: 403 metres (1,322 ft)
- Mouth
  - location: Panton River
  - elevation: 323 metres (1,060 ft)
- Length: 32 km (20 mi)

The Armanda River is a river in the Kimberley region of Western Australia. It is thought that the river was named in 1887 by the surveyor C W Nyulasy.

The headwaters of the Armanda are located north-east of Halls Creek below Bob Black Hills. The river flows due north, almost parallel with the Great Northern Highway and discharges into the Panton River.

The two tributaries of the Armanda river are Prospect Creek and Palm Creek.

The river is a tributary of the Panton River which is, in turn, a tributary of the Ord River.
