= Edward Hardman =

Anglo-Irish geologist

Edward Townley Hardman (6 April 1845 – 30 April 1887) was an Anglo-Irish geologist who played a key role in the discovery of Western Australia's Kimberley goldfields.

Edward Hardman was born in Drogheda in County Louth, Ireland on 6 April 1845. He graduated in mining from the Royal College of Science in Dublin, and in 1870 was appointed as a geologist in the Geological Survey of Ireland.

In 1882, small gold finds in the Kimberley region of Western Australia prompted the Government of Western Australia to appoint a temporary Government Geologist to examine the area. The British Colonial Office chose Hardman for the position, and he arrived in Perth, Western Australia in March 1883. Hardman immediately joined Alexander Forrest's survey expedition to the Kimberley, but the party was confined to the western part of the Kimberley, and no indications of gold were found. The following year, he joined Harry Johnston's survey, which covered most of the Kimberley. Hardman found traces of gold throughout the east Kimberley, especially in the area around the present-day town of Halls Creek. In his published report, he complained that he had received little assistance in his work, as the surveying took priority.

Hardman's report prompted a number of prospecting expeditions in the area, and in 1885 gold was discovered by Charles Hall's party at a location they named Halls Creek. Once the discovery became known, the Kimberley gold rush set in, and a goldfield was proclaimed on 19 May 1886. Hardman's map and report were heavily relied upon by prospectors, and held in high regard. The field's Warden, Charles Price stated

"the whole of the miners are enthusiastic in the praise of Mr Hardman;... every case when he has marked on his plan that auriferous deposits would be found... the result has proved the correctness of his opinion... Nowhere else have they found more than colours."^{1}

Back in 1872, the Government of Western Australia had offered a reward of £5000 for the discovery of the colony's first payable goldfield, with a number of conditions attached. In January 1885, Johnston lodged a claim for the reward, on the grounds that

"while in command of the Kimberley Survey Parties in 1884 I discovered a large area of auriferous country".^{2}

When Hardman learned of Johnston's claim, he lodged one himself, countering Johnston's claim with the statement

"not only did he make no discoveries of gold in the district,... he constantly decried the idea of gold being found at all; sneered at all my efforts to prospect the country; and was with the utmost difficulty persuaded to afford me any assistance...."^{3}

Consideration of the claims were deferred until May 1888.

Hardman hoped for his temporary appointment as Government Geologist to be made permanent, but the government would not approve the funding, and on the completion of his contract in 1885 he returned to Ireland, where he again worked on the Geological Survey of Ireland. In August 1886, the Government of Western Australia approved the funding for a permanent Government Geologist position, and Hardman submitted an application for the job.

In March 1887, Hardman began field work in the Wicklow Mountains of Ireland. He was in bad health and the weather was poor, with frequent snowstorms and rain. Early in April, he contracted typhoid fever, and died a few days later in a Dublin hospital. He was survived by a wife and two young children.

The Western Australian government agreed to offer the Government Geologist post to Hardman shortly before news of his death reached them. When in May 1888 the government considered claims for the reward for discovery of the goldfield, it was decided that the Kimberley goldfield, which had proven disappointing, had not met the stipulated conditions, and no reward was paid out. Hardman's contribution was recognised, however, with a gift of £500 to his widow Louisa Hardman.

Three geographical features in the Kimberley bear Edward Hardman's name: Hardman Point, Hardman Range and Mount Hardman.

== Notes ==
1. Western Australian Legislative Council Parliamentary Paper no. 90/87. Quoted in Playford and Ruddock (1985).
2. Western Australian Department of Mines file 10650/94 p. 7. Quoted in Playford and Ruddock (1985).
3. Western Australian Department of Mines file 10650/94 pp. 8–9. Quoted in Playford and Ruddock (1985).
