= Harry Johnston (surveyor) =

Harry Frederick Johnston (1853 – June 1915) was Surveyor-General of Western Australia from 1896 to 1915.

Harry Johnston was born in 1853, as a grandson of Marshall Waller Clifton. He qualified as a surveyor. In 1884, he led a surveying expedition to the Kimberley region of Western Australia. A geologist who was attached to the group, Edward Hardman, was one of the first to discover gold in the area, and his report and maps became a valued resource in the subsequent Kimberley gold rush. In January 1885, Johnston made a claim for a reward offered by the Government of Western Australia for the discovery of the goldfield. He was widely criticised for what was seen by many as "Mr. Johnston's attempt to filch the credit." However Johnston later stated "All I wished was that my claim as a leader of the party and discoverer of new country should not be overlooked."

Harry Johnston was appointed Surveyor-General in 1896, and held the position until his death. In June 1915, Johnston was rushed to hospital after an accident at his home in Greenmount, when he was reported to have been shot in the groin by his young daughter while teaching her how to use firearms. He died at hospital, and a bullet was found during the post-mortem. The coroner found that Johnston's death had occurred as a result of an accident during target practice.

Harry Johnston's eldest son Edward Johnston had a long and distinguished political career; his second-youngest Edgar Johnston was a fighter pilot and flying ace in First World War and later one of the leaders in civil aviation in Australia.
