= Electoral results for the district of West Perth =

Western Australian district election results

This is a list of electoral results for the Electoral district of West Perth in Western Australian state elections.

== Members for West Perth ==
Member	Party	Term
Timothy Quinlan	Non-aligned	1890–1894
Barrington Wood	Ministerialist	1894–1901
George Leake	Oppositionist	1901–1902
Charles Moran	Independent	1902–1905
Frederick Illingworth	Ministerialist	1905–1907
Thomas Draper	Ministerialist	1907–1911
Eben Allen	Liberal	1911–1917
Thomas Draper	Nationalist	1917–1921
Edith Cowan	Nationalist	1921–1924
Thomas Davy	Nationalist	1924–1933
Robert Ross McDonald	Nationalist	1933–1945
Robert Ross McDonald	Liberal	1945–1949
Robert Ross McDonald	Liberal Country League	1949–1950
Joseph Totterdell	Liberal Country League	1950–1953
Stanley Heal	Labor	1953–1962

== Election results ==
=== Elections in the 1950s ===
1959 Western Australian state election: West Perth
Party	Candidate	Votes	%	±%
Labor	Stanley Heal	3,421	50.7	−7.1
Liberal and Country	Raymond Nowland	3,322	49.3	+7.1
Total formal votes		6,743	97.9	+0.6
Informal votes		145	2.1	−0.6
Turnout		6,888	87.9	−0.8
Labor hold		Swing	−7.1	

1956 Western Australian state election: West Perth
Party	Candidate	Votes	%	±%
Labor	Stanley Heal	4,385	57.8	
Liberal and Country	Raymond Nowland	3,206	42.2	
Total formal votes		7,591	97.3	
Informal votes		212	2.7	
Turnout		7,803	88.7	
Labor hold		Swing		

1953 Western Australian state election: West Perth
Party	Candidate	Votes	%	±%
Labor	Stanley Heal	3,665	52.4	+10.8
Liberal and Country	Joseph Totterdell	3,333	47.6	−5.3
Total formal votes		6,998	98.1	+0.7
Informal votes		132	1.9	−0.7
Turnout		7,130	91.9	+3.5
Labor gain from Liberal and Country		Swing	+8.1	

1950 Western Australian state election: West Perth
Party	Candidate	Votes	%	±%
Liberal and Country	Joseph Totterdell	4,355	52.9	
Labor	Lucien Triat	3,425	41.6	
Independent	Frederick Swaine	448	5.4	
Total formal votes		8,228	97.4	
Informal votes		216	2.6	
Turnout		8,444	88.4	
Two-party-preferred result
Liberal and Country	Joseph Totterdell		55.7	
Labor	Lucien Triat		44.3	
Liberal and Country hold		Swing		

- Two party preferred vote was estimated.

=== Elections in the 1940s ===
1947 Western Australian state election: West Perth
Party	Candidate	Votes	%	±%
Liberal	Robert McDonald	unopposed		
Liberal hold		Swing		

1943 Western Australian state election: West Perth
Party	Candidate	Votes	%	±%
Nationalist	Robert McDonald	3,168	53.8	−9.0
Labor	William Beadle	2,723	46.2	+9.0
Total formal votes		5,891	97.7	−0.2
Informal votes		139	2.3	+0.2
Turnout		6,030	84.0	−5.4
Nationalist hold		Swing	−9.0	

=== Elections in the 1930s ===
1939 Western Australian state election: West Perth
Party	Candidate	Votes	%	±%
Nationalist	Robert McDonald	3,691	62.8	+7.8
Labor	Roy Nevile	2,183	37.2	−7.8
Total formal votes		5,874	97.9	−1.2
Informal votes		126	2.1	+1.2
Turnout		6,000	89.4	+20.0
Nationalist hold		Swing	+7.8	

1936 Western Australian state election: West Perth
Party	Candidate	Votes	%	±%
Nationalist	Robert McDonald	2,595	55.0	+15.7
Labor	William Beadle	2,122	45.0	−0.8
Total formal votes		4,717	99.1	+1.0
Informal votes		45	0.9	−1.0
Turnout		4,762	69.4	−21.7
Nationalist hold		Swing	+4.2	

1933 Western Australian state election: West Perth
Party	Candidate	Votes	%	±%
Labor	John Blair	2,738	45.8	+1.7
Nationalist	Robert McDonald	2,349	39.3	−16.6
Ind. Nationalist	Leonard Goold	549	9.2	+9.2
Ind. Nationalist	Frank Cato	345	5.8	+5.8
Total formal votes		5,981	98.1	−1.0
Informal votes		117	1.9	+1.0
Turnout		6,098	91.1	+13.0
Two-party-preferred result
Nationalist	Robert McDonald	3,041	50.8	−5.1
Labor	John Blair	2,940	49.2	+5.1
Nationalist hold		Swing	−5.1	

1930 Western Australian state election: West Perth
Party	Candidate	Votes	%	±%
Nationalist	Thomas Davy	2,884	55.9	
Labor	Frank Darcey	2,277	44.1	
Total formal votes		5,114	99.1	
Informal votes		47	0.9	
Turnout		5,208	78.1	
Nationalist hold		Swing		

=== Elections in the 1920s ===
1927 Western Australian state election: West Perth
Party	Candidate	Votes	%	±%
Nationalist	Thomas Davy	1,766	44.4	+9.6
Labor	Alexander McDougall	1,405	35.4	+1.1
Women's Electoral League	Edith Cowan	803	20.2	+20.2
Total formal votes		3,974	97.5	−1.7
Informal votes		101	2.5	+1.7
Turnout		4,075	76.2	+11.4
Two-party-preferred result
Nationalist	Thomas Davy	2,400	60.4	−0.4
Labor	Alexander McDougall	1,574	39.6	+0.4
Nationalist hold		Swing	−0.4	

1924 Western Australian state election: West Perth
Party	Candidate	Votes	%	±%
Nationalist	Thomas Davy	1,250	34.8	+34.8
Labor	Alexander McDougall	1,233	34.3	+34.3
Nationalist	Edith Cowan	1,108	30.8	−7.5
Total formal votes		3,561	99.2	+0.7
Informal votes		30	0.8	−0.7
Turnout		3,621	64.8	−4.5
Two-party-preferred result
Nationalist	Thomas Davy	2,182	60.8	
Labor	Alexander McDougall	1,409	39.2	
Nationalist hold		Swing	N/A	

1921 Western Australian state election: West Perth
Party	Candidate	Votes	%	±%
Nationalist	Edith Cowan	1,164	38.3	+38.3
Nationalist	Thomas Draper	1,109	36.5	−16.8
Nationalist	Ebenezer Allen	767	25.2	+25.2
Total formal votes		3,040	98.5	+3.1
Informal votes		45	1.5	−3.1
Turnout		3,085	69.3	+8.0
Two-candidate-preferred result
Nationalist	Edith Cowan	1,543	50.8	
Nationalist	Thomas Draper	1,497	49.2	
Nationalist hold		Swing	N/A	

=== Elections in the 1910s ===
1917 Western Australian state election: West Perth
Party	Candidate	Votes	%	±%
Nationalist	Thomas Draper	1,525	53.3	+53.3
National Liberal	Ebenezer Allen	1,159	40.5	–23.1
National Liberal	Joseph East	178	6.2	+6.2
Total formal votes		2,862	95.4	–4.3
Informal votes		139	4.6	+4.3
Turnout		3,001	61.3	+13.0
Nationalist hold		Swing	N/A	

1914 Western Australian state election: West Perth
Party	Candidate	Votes	%	±%
Liberal	Eben Allen	2,288	63.6	+30.2
Labor	James Doland	1,308	36.4	−7.6
Total formal votes		3,596	99.7	+1.1
Informal votes		9	0.3	−1.1
Turnout		3,605	48.3	−33.9
Liberal hold		Swing	+9.1	

1911 Western Australian state election: West Perth
Party	Candidate	Votes	%	±%
Labor	Walter Simpson	1,608	44.0	
Ministerialist	Eben Allen	1,219	33.4	
Ministerialist	Richard Vincent	825	22.6	
Total formal votes		3,652	98.6	
Informal votes		52	1.4	
Turnout		3,704	82.2	
Two-party-preferred result
Ministerialist	Eben Allen	1,991	54.5	
Labor	Walter Simpson	1,661	45.5	
Ministerialist hold		Swing		

=== Elections in the 1900s ===
1908 Western Australian state election: West Perth
Party	Candidate	Votes	%	±%
Ministerialist	Thomas Draper	1,401	54.7	−10.7
Ministerialist	Walter Simpson	1,161	45.3	+45.3
Total formal votes		2,562	99.6	+1.2
Informal votes		9	0.4	−1.2
Turnout		2,571	66.0	+16.8
Ministerialist hold		Swing	N/A	

1907 West Perth state by-election
Party	Candidate	Votes	%	±%
National Political League	Thomas Draper	1,433	57.4	+57.4
Ministerialist	Walter Simpson	1,064	42.6	+42.6
Total formal votes		2,497	99.4	+1.0
Informal votes		16	0.6	−1.0
Turnout		2,513	65.4	+16.2
National Political League hold		Swing	N/A	

1905 Western Australian state election: West Perth
Party	Candidate	Votes	%	±%
Ministerialist	Frederick Illingworth	1,276	65.4	+65.4
Ministerialist	James Speed	655	33.6	+33.6
Labour	Robert Norman	21	1.1	–23.1
Total formal votes		1,952	98.4	±0
Informal votes		32	1.6	±0
Turnout		1,984	49.2	+9.7
Ministerialist hold		Swing	N/A	

1904 Western Australian state election: West Perth
Party	Candidate	Votes	%	±%
Independent	Charles Moran	1,064	38.2	+6.4
Labour	Robert Norman	1,049	37.6	+11.7
Ministerialist	Walter Simpson	676	24.2	+24.2
Total formal votes		2,789	98.4	+1.5
Informal votes		44	1.6	–1.5
Turnout		2,833	39.5	n/a
Independent hold		Swing	+6.4	

1902 West Perth state by-election
Party	Candidate	Votes	%	±%
Independent	Charles Moran	495	31.9	+31.9
Labour	Fred Gill	402	25.9	+25.9
Independent	John Phair	263	16.9	+16.9
Opposition	Alfred Russell	169	10.9	+10.9
Anti Early Closing Association	Thomas Molloy	153	9.9	+9.9
Opposition	John Brickhill	71	4.6	+4.6
Total formal votes		1,553	96.9	−1.4
Informal votes		50	3.1	+1.4
Turnout		1,603	N/A	N/A
Independent gain from Opposition		Swing	N/A	

1901 Western Australian state election: West Perth
Party	Candidate	Votes	%	±%
Opposition	George Leake	886	51.7	+51.7
Ministerialist	Barrington Wood	828	48.3	–5.6
Total formal votes		1,714	98.7	+0.4
Informal votes		22	1.3	–0.4
Turnout		1,736	46.8	+2.3
Opposition gain from Ministerialist		Swing	+51.7	

=== Elections in the 1890s ===
1897 Western Australian colonial election: West Perth
Party	Candidate	Votes	%	±%
Ministerialist	Barrington Wood	411	53.9	
Ministerialist	Thomas Molloy	260	34.1	
Opposition	Robert Knox-Peden	91	11.9	
Total formal votes		762	98.3	
Informal votes		13	1.7	
Turnout		775	44.5	
Ministerialist hold		Swing		

1894 Western Australian colonial election: West Perth
Party	Candidate	Votes	%	±%
National Education	Barrington Wood	398	42.1	+42.1
Education Defence	Timothy Quinlan	379	40.1	–11.7
None	Richard Haynes	169	17.9	–29.3

1890 Western Australian colonial election: West Perth
Party	Candidate	Votes	%	±%
None	Timothy Quinlan	249	52.8	n/a
None	Richard Haynes	223	47.2	n/a
