= Patrick Quinlan =

Patrick Quinlan may refer to:

- Patrick Quinlan (author), American author and political activist
- Patrick Quinlan (cricketer) (1891–1935), Australian cricketer
- Patrick Quinlan (politician) (1919–2001), Irish academic and politician
- Patrick L. Quinlan (1883–1948), Irish radical journalist and political activist
- Pat Quinlan (Irish Army officer) (1919–1997), Irish Army officer who commanded the Irish UN force that fought at the Siege of Jadotville in Katanga

== See also ==
- Quinlan (disambiguation)
