= Quinlan =

Quinlan is an Irish surname and masculine given name. Notable people with the name include:

== Surname ==
- Agnes Clune Quinlan (1873-1949), Irish composer
- Anthony Quinlan (born 1984), English actor
- Arthur Quinlan (1921–2012), Irish journalist
- Bernard Quinlan (1885–1950), Australian cricketer and doctor
- Bernie Quinlan (born 1951), Australian rules footballer
- Bill Quinlan (1932–2015), American professional football player
- Carrie Quinlan, British actress and comedy writer
- Derek Quinlan (born 1947), Irish businessman
- Dan Quinlan (1863–1940), American actor and vaudeville and minstrel show performer.
- Frances Quinlan, (born c. 1986), American musician
- Heather Quinlan (born 1974), American filmmaker and writer
- Jack Quinlan (1927–1965), American sportscaster
- James Quinlan (1833–1906), Union Army officer during the American Civil War
- Jim Quinlan (1922–2003), American professional basketball player
- Jim Quinlan (1934–2020), American screenwriter and author
- Jimmy Quinlan (born 1981), Canadian lacrosse player
- John Quinlan (bishop) (1826–1883), Roman Catholic bishop
- John Quinlan (wrestler) (born 1974), American actor and wrestler
- Karen Ann Quinlan (1954–1985), figure in the "right to die" debate in the United States
- Kathleen Quinlan (born 1954), American actress
- Maeve Quinlan (born 1964), American actress
- Michael Quinlan (civil servant) (1930–2009), British permanent secretary to the Ministry of Defence
- Michael R. Quinlan (1944–2025), American businessman
- Pat Quinlan (Irish Army officer) (1919–1997), commanding officer of the Irish UN forces
- Patrick Quinlan (author), American author and political activist
- Patrick Quinlan (cricketer) (1891–1935), Australian cricketer
- Patrick Quinlan (politician) (1919–2001), Irish academic and politician
- Patrick L. Quinlan (1883–1948), Irish-American radical journalist and political activist
- Peter Quinlan, Chief Justice of Western Australia from 2018
- Robb Quinlan (born 1977), American Major League Baseball player
- Roberta Quinlan, American musician
- Ross Quinlan, computer scientist
- Thomas Quinlan (impresario) (1881–1951), British musical impresario
- Thomas F. Quinlan (died 1970), Irish Roman Catholic bishop in Korea
- Thomas J. Quinlan (1929–2012), Roman Catholic priest
- Timothy Quinlan (1861–1927), Australian politician
- Tom Quinlan (born 1968), American Major League Baseball player
- Will J. Quinlan (1877–1963), American artist
- Quinlan (baseball) (fl. 1874), American baseball player

== Given name ==
- Quinlan Terry (born 1937), English architect

== Fictional characters ==
- Quinlan Vos, a Jedi Master in the Star Wars franchise
- Todd Quinlan, aka "The Todd", a character in the TV series Scrubs
