= Ebenezer Allen =

Ebenezer Allen may refer to:

- Ebenezer Allen (Vermont politician) (1743–1806)
- Ebenezer Allen (Texas politician) (1804–1863)
- Eben Allen (1868–1931), Australian businessman and politician
