= Savoy Hotel, Perth =

Former hotel in Perth, Western Australia

Savoy Hotel
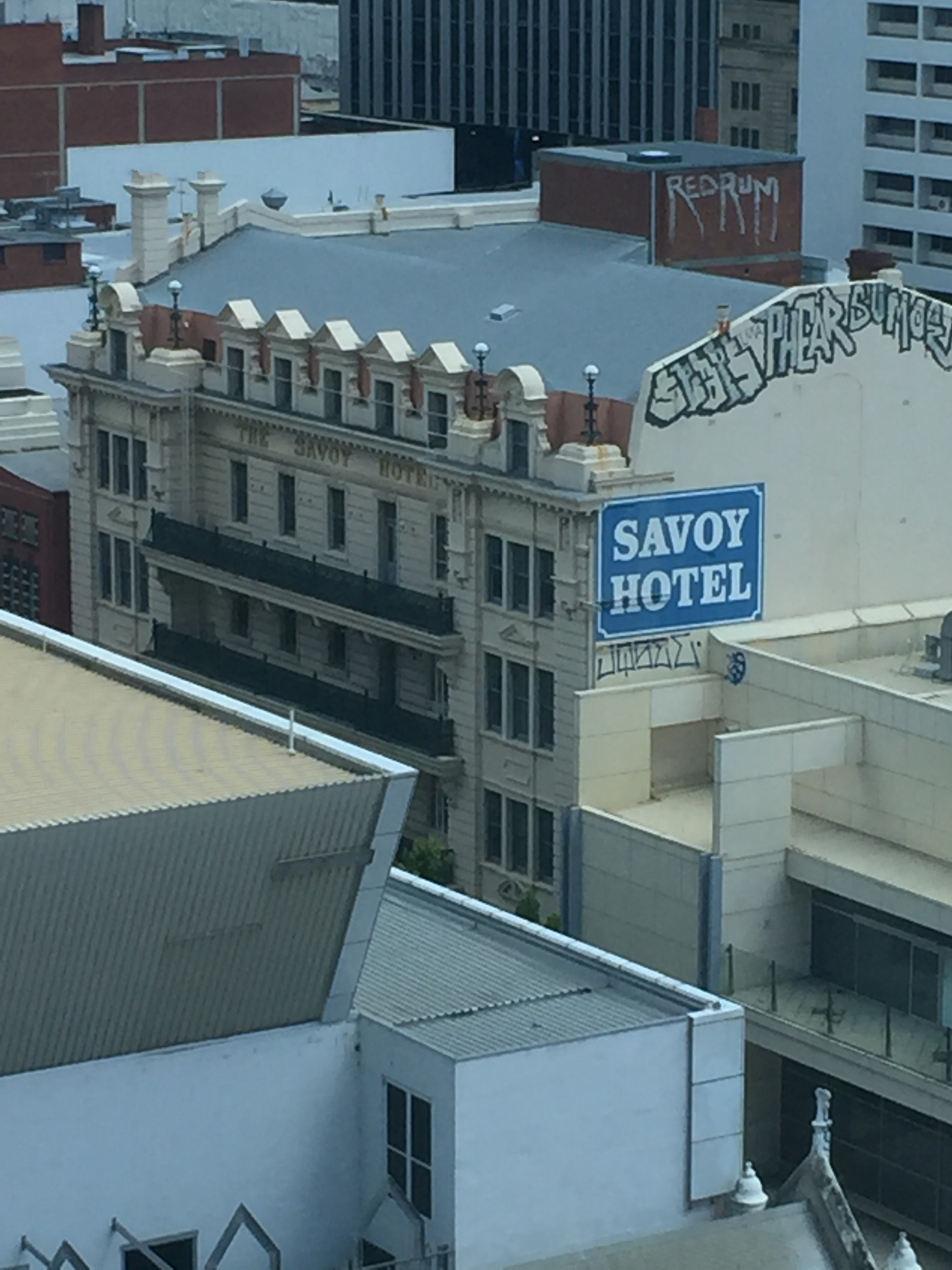
- Interactive map of the Savoy Hotel area
- Alternative names: Gresham Hotel; Savoy Plaza Hotel

General information
- Type: Hotel
- Architectural style: Federation Free Classical
- Location: 636–640 Hay Street, Perth, Western Australia
- Coordinates: 31°57′15″S 115°51′34″E
- Completed: 1914
- Owner: Starhill Global REIT

Height
- Height: Five storey

Design and construction
- Architect: Talbot Hobbs
- Architecture firm: Hobbs, Smith & Forbes
- Main contractor: C. W. Arnott

Renovating team
- Architect: William G. Bennett

Western Australia Heritage Register
- Type: State Registered Place
- Designated: 23 November 2001
- Reference no.: 3264

The Savoy Hotel is a heritage-listed former hotel in Hay Street, Perth, Western Australia. It was built in the 1910s and closed in 1991. It is listed on the State Register of Historic Places, has been classified by the National Trust of Australia, and was listed on the former Register of the National Estate.

== History ==
The site was originally occupied by a two-storey hotel, called the Shamrock Hotel, constructed in the 1840s. In 1845, the proprietor of the Shamrock Hotel Perth was Michael Henry Condron. In 1855, Condron invited Lomas Toovey to join him in ownership of the Shamrock Hotel and the following year the hotel was leased to Joseph Aloysius Lucas, who operated the hotel until his death in 1880. In 1883 Daniel Connor, a successful merchant and pastoralist (one of Perth's leading financiers and landholders), purchased the hotel from Lucas' widow, Jane Mary. Connor then leased it to Timothy Quinlan, who subsequently married Connor's daughter, Teresa. Connor died in 1898 and the hotel was transferred into the joint ownership of Quinlan, Michael O'Connor (Connor's eldest son and Quinlan's brother-in-law), Bernard Connor (Connor's third son) and Bernard's wife, Catherine. In 1891 Monica Haynes (Connor's third daughter) replaced Catherine as a joint tenant.

In November 1912, tenders were called for the development of a new Shamrock Hotel to the design of Perth architect, Talbot Hobbs of Hobbs, Smith & Forbes. The contract was let to prominent builder C. W. Arnott for £A 48,787, equivalent to A$6.7 million in 2022. The building was later described as the future Gresham Hotel. Hobbs' design was for a five-storey hotel, which is said to have been the largest in Australia for some time. The building was demolished in 1913. In 1914 the name of the hotel was officially changed to the Savoy Hotel. In 1916 the hotel was advertised as Ritz of Australia. The Savoy also had a theatre at the back, which seated 1,500 patrons.

The Savoy Hotel continued operations between World Wars I and II, and in the 1930s part of the bottom of the hotel was given to retail. In April 1930 a fire broke out at the Savoy Hotel, severely damaging the roof, ceiling and fittings of the kitchen.

In October 1931 the Betts & Betts shoe store moved into the ground floor shops fronting Hay Street, previously occupied by Fisher Beard & Co.

In February 1933 Thomas Davy, the MLA for West Perth (Attorney-General and Minister for Education), died unexpectedly of a heart attack while playing cards with his wife and friends at the hotel.

In 1936 William G. Bennett, was responsible for the remodelling of the interior of the Savoy Hotel.

During World War II, the Savoy Hotel was taken over by the Australian Army and used as an army club, for the accommodation of commissioned officers. Nearly 100 officers were billeted at the club at any one time.

In September 1959 Cecil Brothers purchased the building and adjacent properties from the Connor Estate and in 1961 Betts & Betts took over the whole of the ground floor and created an area that was said to be the largest shoe shop in the world. The hotel was leased and managed by Jack Sheedy, former East Fremantle Australian rules footballer and later player/coach of East Perth. Sheedy renamed the hotel Savoy Plaza Hotel on the basis that it would give the hotel a more Commonwealth flavour, in reference to the 1962 British Empire and Commonwealth Games, and tying it in with other nearby buildings, specifically the adjoining Plaza Theatre and Arcade.

The hotel closed in June 1991 with all the furniture and fitting sold by the lessee at auction. In 1997 the building was declared dangerous following a dilapidation survey by Wood and Grieve Engineers. In 1989 the Savoy Hotel, including the property to the rear extending to Murray Street, was offered for sale. The site was expected to fetch between A$40–47 million. It was again offered for sale in 1996 with an expected sale price of A$23 million.

In 2002 the exterior of the Savoy Hotel building was refurbished, in conjunction with the development of the adjoining David Jones site.

In 2009 the hotel site, together with the David Jones site was purchased by Starhill Global REIT for A$114.5 million from Centro Properties.

=== Savoy Cinema ===
In March 1954 Lionel Hart established Independent Film Distributors, which opened Perth's first newsreel theatrette, the Liberty in Barrack Street, with 450 seats on a single upper level; the theatrette initially specialised in Continental and other art films. Independent Film Distributors subsequently established a second theatrette on 23 December 1955, which was named the Savoy and located in the basement of the Savoy Hotel in Hay Street in what was previously a billiard saloon.

The 300 seat Savoy ran continuous "hour shows", that is, programmes of not less than an hour (though frequently slightly more), starting at 10 am and continuing without a break until approximately 11 pm, allowing patrons to enter and leave as they pleased, and to stay as long as they wished. Its appeal was particularly to shoppers and others with a short time to spare in the city, so it advertised nursery, powder rooms, free cloak and parcel depository.

The introduction of television brought this to an end, by providing similar programmes free in viewers' own lounge rooms. So, at the Savoy, continuous programming of re-runs of successful feature films replaced the newsreel format; for example in January 1964 seven sessions per day of a Three Stooges' film, in January 1965 eight sessions per day of East of Eden. Even this was difficult to sustain, and the cinema drifted more and more into sensational programming, after the success of films such as London in the Raw, presented in June 1965, to which children under 16 were not admitted. By the time of the "R" certificate legislation in 1972, the Savoy had a reputation for rather risqué programmes, and in 1975 was one of the first cinemas to convert to a policy of screening only R-rated movies, a policy with which it was very successful until the early 1980s.

It closed briefly in 1983, then reverted to more conventional programming when taken over by John Marsden later that year, re-opening on 17 November 1983. When Marsden had difficulties with film supply, he sold it to Ken Hill who installed video projection and in February 1987 began to run it as an adult cinema, with topless usherettes. The cinema closed in August 1991 and its equipment moved to Club X Cinema in the basement of the Club Emporium in Barrack Street.

In 1997, the building that housed the old Savoy was still there, but the cinema staircase and entrance had been demolished, and shops extended across these gaps; access was still possible from the laneway behind to the derelict interior, as it was with the rest of the Savoy Hotel.

== Heritage value ==
The Savoy Hotel was classified by the National Trust of Western Australia on 21 August 1978 and entered into the Register of the National Estate by the Australian Heritage Commission in September 1982.

The Savoy Hotel has also been placed on the State Heritage Register and is listed on the City of Perth's Municipal Inventory.
