= Mumballup, Western Australia =

Locality in Western Australia

Mumballup Western Australia
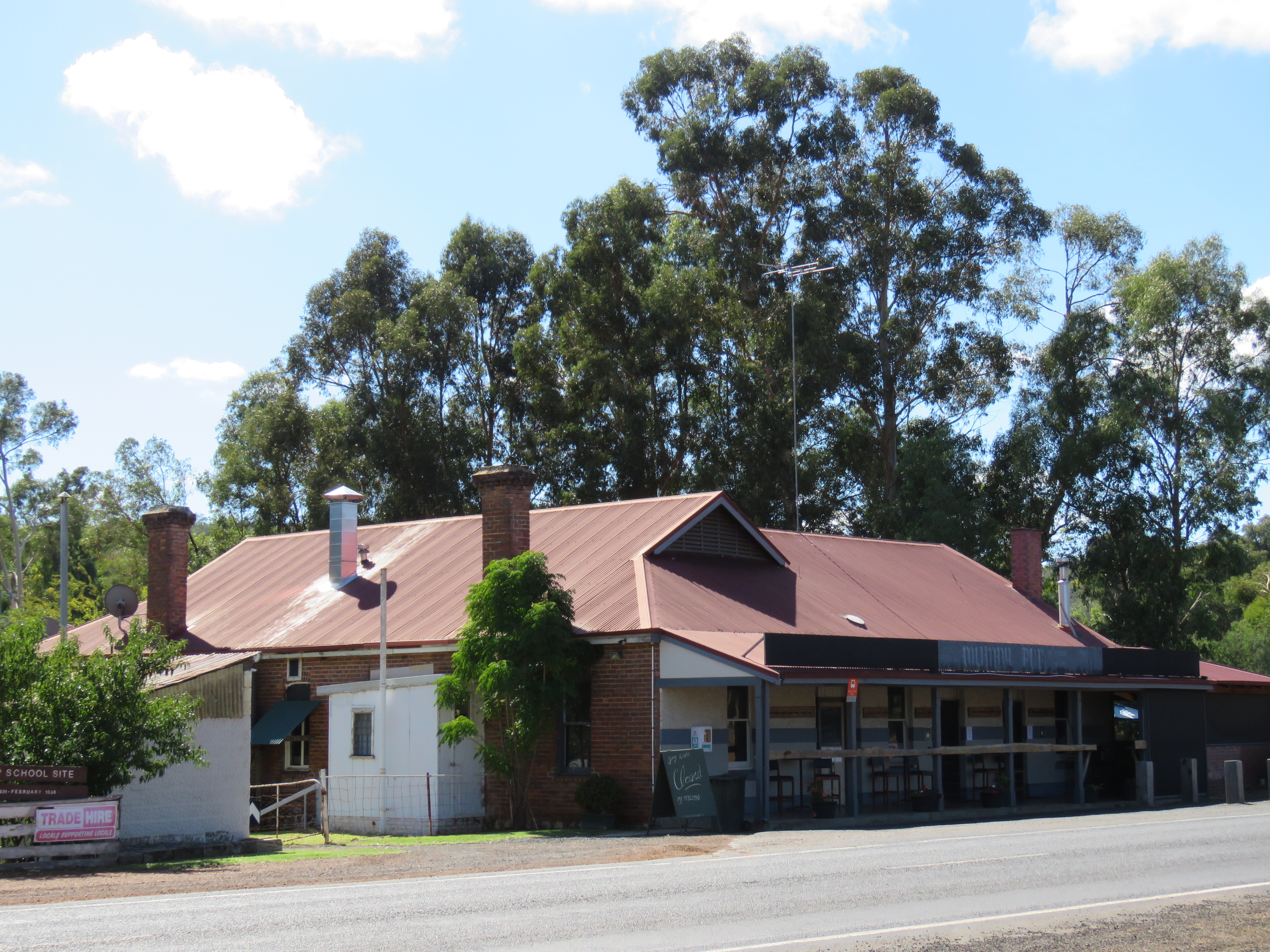
- The Mumby Pub, Mumballup, in April 2022

- Coordinates: 33.53°S 116.11°E
- Population: 100 (SAL 2021)
- Postcode(s): 6225
- Elevation: 133 m (436 ft)
- Location: 177 km (110 mi) south of Perth; 27 km (17 mi) east of Donnybrook; 42 km (26 mi) north west of Boyup Brook
- LGA(s): Shire of Donnybrook-Balingup
- State electorate(s): Warren-Blackwood
- Federal division(s): Forrest
Localities around Mumballup:
| Lyalls Mill | Lyalls Mill | Cardiff |
| Glen Mervyn | Mumballup | Cardiff |
| Noggerup | Noggerup | Noggerup |

Mumballup is a locality in the South West region of Western Australia, situated between Collie and Boyup Brook, 221 kilometres (137 mi) south of Perth. The town is in the Shire of Donnybrook-Balingup.

It was the location of the death of the former premier of Western Australia James Mitchell in 1951, on a train on the Donnybrook–Katanning railway line. Mumballup was once a siding on the Donnybrook–Katanning railway but the railway line ceased operation in 1982. The Mumballup siding, which opened in 1908, was closed in 1980.

It is a location on the Bibbulmun Track.

Mumballup and the Shire of Donnybrook–Balingup are located on the traditional land of the Wardandi people of the Noongar nation.
