= Yabberup, Western Australia =

Locality in the Shire of Donnybrook–Balingup, Western Australia

Yabberup
- other
- Coordinates: 33.53°S 116.01°E
- Country: Australia
- State: Western Australia
- LGA: Shire of Donnybrook–Balingup
- Location: 176 km (109 mi) from Perth; 43 km (27 mi) from Bunbury; 18 km (11 mi) from Donnybrook

Government
  - State electorate: Collie-Preston
  - Federal division: Forrest

Area
  - Total: 68.6 km^{2} (26.5 sq mi)

Population
  - Total: 162 (SAL 2021)
- Postcode: 6239
Localities around Yabberup
Wellington Forest	Mungalup	Lyalls Mill
Lowden	Yabberup	Glen Mervyn
Thomson Brook	Noggerup	Noggerup

Yabberup is a rural locality of the Shire of Donnybrook–Balingup in the South West region of Western Australia. The Preston River and the Donnybrook–Boyup Brook Road run through the centre of the locality from east to west. A small north-western corner of the Greater Preston National Park extends into the south-east of the locality.

The townsite of Preston is located within Yabberup, named after the river it is located on. Originally known as Upper Preston when land was first set aside for the town in 1892, the town was surveyed in 1899 and renamed to Preston.

Yabberup and the Shire of Donnybrook–Balingup are located on the traditional land of the Wardandi people of the Noongar nation.

The locality is home to the heritage listed Yabberup Hall, which dates back to 1894. The Flemish bond brickwork building was officially opened in August 1896, then as the Preston Agricultural Hall. The hall was added to in 1920 and 1973–74 and had tennis courts added in 1988.

Yabberup was once a siding on the Donnybrook–Katanning railway, with the railway line having ceased operation in 1982. The Yabberup siding, opened in 1908, was closed in 1961.
