= Bernard Quinlan =

Australian cricketer and doctor

Personal information
- Full name: Bernard Gerald Quinlan
- Born: August 1885; Perth, Western Australia
- Died: 11 September 1951 (aged 65–66); Heidelberg, Victoria
- Batting: Right-handed
- Bowling: Right-arm medium
- Role: Batsman
- Relatives: Timothy Quinlan (father); Patrick Quinlan (brother)

Domestic team information
- Years: Team
- 1911: Ireland
- Only First-class: 20 July 1911 Ireland v Scotland

Career statistics
Competition	First-class
Matches	1
Runs scored	–
Batting average	–
100s/50s	–
Top score	–
Balls bowled	84
Wickets	3
Bowling average	16.33
5 wickets in innings	0
10 wickets in match	0
Best bowling	2/36
Catches/stumpings	0/–
- Source: CricketArchive, 28 June 2012

Bernard Gerald Quinlan (August 1885 – 11 September 1951) was an Australian cricketer and doctor. The son of Timothy Quinlan and grandson of Daniel Connor, both Irish-born politicians, Quinlan was born in Perth, Western Australia, and educated at the University of Adelaide, later progressing to Trinity College Dublin, where he studied medicine. While in Ireland, Quinlan played for the university's cricket team against touring English county teams, and later represented the Irish cricket team in the traditional match against Scotland, in what was to be his only first-class match. With Ireland declaring their first innings with the loss of six wickets, Quinlan did not bat, but took a total of three wickets while bowling. After his graduation in 1913, Quinlan returned to Western Australia, where he practised medicine. During Australia's involvement in World War I, he was made an honorary captain in the Australian Army Medical Corps, later being made a captain in the Australian Army Reserve. Quinlan later moved to Malvern, Victoria, a suburb of Melbourne. He died at the Repatriation General Hospital in Heidelberg in September 1951, and was buried in the Roman Catholic section of the Springvale Cemetery. His younger brother, Patrick Francis Quinlan, also played cricket for Ireland, having studied alongside him at Dublin University.
