= Lyalls Mill, Western Australia =

Locality in the Shire of Collie, Western Australia

Lyalls Mill
- other
- Coordinates: 33.46°S 116.11°E
- Country: Australia
- State: Western Australia
- LGA: Shire of Collie
- Location: 170 km (110 mi) from Perth; 46 km (29 mi) from Bunbury; 12 km (7.5 mi) from Collie

Government
  - State electorate: Collie-Preston
  - Federal division: O'Connor

Area
  - Total: 38.1 km^{2} (14.7 sq mi)

Population
  - Total: 17 (SAL 2021)
- Postcode: 6225
Localities around Lyalls Mill
Mornington	Preston Settlement	Cardiff
Yabberup	Lyalls Mill	Cardiff
Glen Mervyn	Glen Mervyn	Mumballup

Lyalls Mill is a predominantly forested rural locality of the Shire of Collie in the South West region of Western Australia.

The timber mill at Lyalls Mill was destroyed by fire in February 1918, and again on 12 March 1936, but rebuilt on both occasions.

Lyalls Mill is located on the traditional land of the Kaniyang and Wiilman people of the Noongar nation.
