= Glen Mervyn, Western Australia =

Locality in the Shire of Donnybrook–Balingup, Western Australia

Glen Mervyn
- other
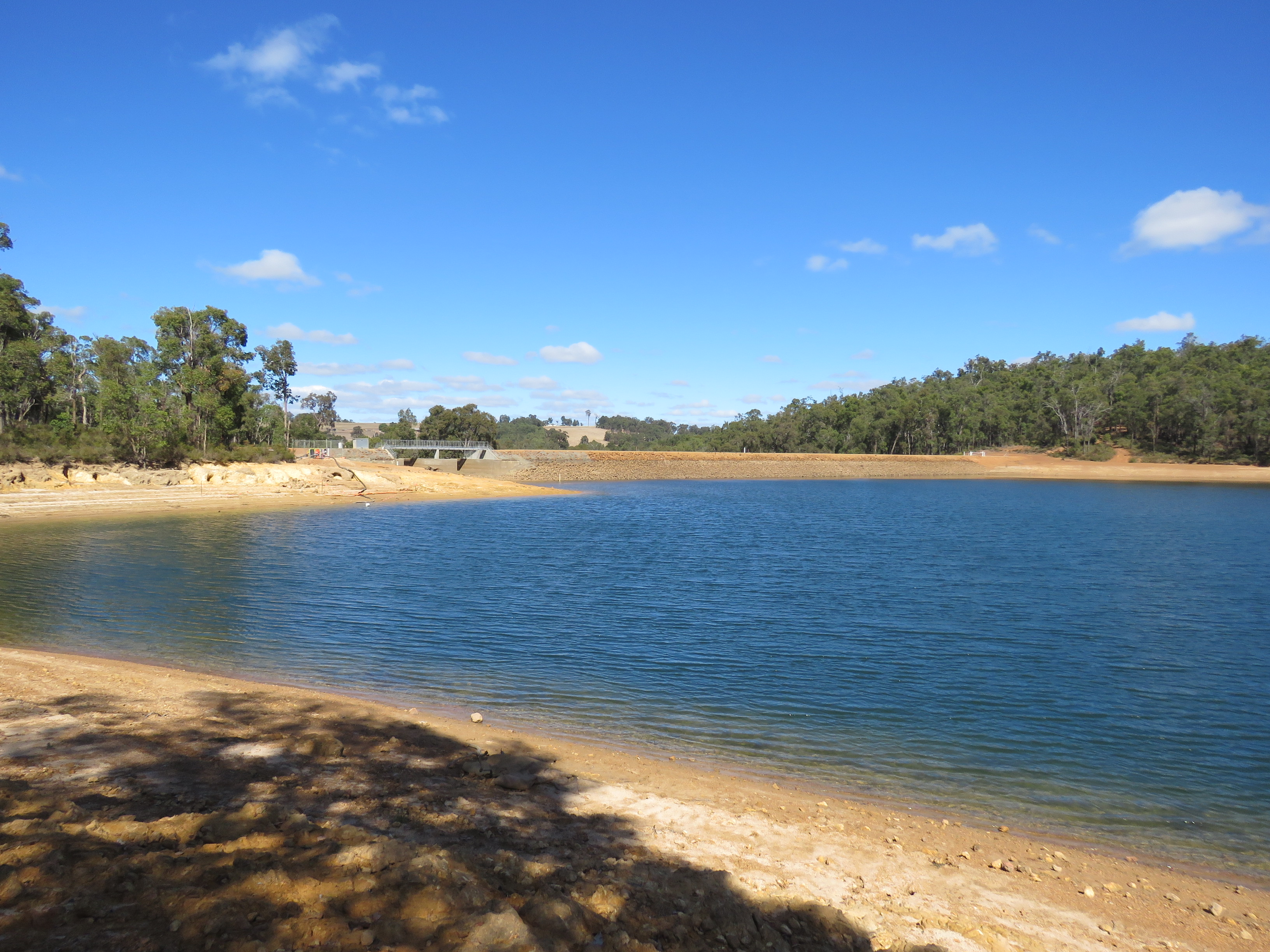
- The Glen Mervyn Dam in April 2022
- Coordinates: 33°31′48″S 116°04′13″E
- Country: Australia
- State: Western Australia
- LGA: Shire of Donnybrook–Balingup
- Location: 176 km (109 mi) from Perth; 46 km (29 mi) from Bunbury; 23 km (14 mi) from Donnybrook

Government
  - State electorate: Collie-Preston
  - Federal division: Forrest

Area
  - Total: 37.8 km^{2} (14.6 sq mi)

Population
  - Total: 47 (SAL 2021)
- Postcode: 6239
Localities around Glen Mervyn
Yabberup	Lyalls Mill	Lyalls Mill
Yabberup	Glen Mervyn	Mumballup
Yabberup	Noggerup	Noggerup

Glen Mervyn is a rural locality of the Shire of Donnybrook–Balingup in the South West region of Western Australia. The Preston River and the Donnybrook–Boyup Brook Road run through the centre of the locality from east to west. The Glen Mervyn Dam and reservoir is located on the north-eastern boundary of the locality, with the dam itself being located on the Mumballup side of the border.

Glen Mervyn and the Shire of Donnybrook–Balingup are located on the traditional land of the Wardandi people of the Noongar nation.

Glen Mervyn was once a siding on the Donnybrook–Katanning railway but the railway line ceased operation in 1982. The Glen Mervyn siding, which opened in 1909, was closed in 1975.

In 1951, state governor and former premier James Mitchell died in office at Glen Mervyn siding in his personal railway carriage.
