= Thomas Draper =

Australian politician (1864–1946)

The Honourable Thomas Draper CBE KC
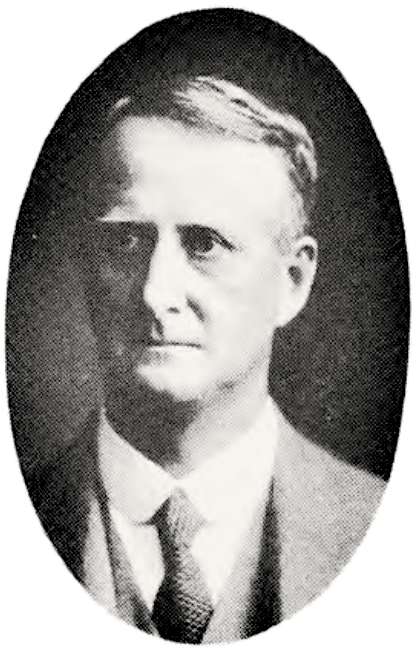

Justice of the Supreme Court of Western Australia
- In office April 1921 – July 1939
- Preceded by: John Rooth
- Succeeded by: Lawrence Jackson

Attorney-General of Western Australia
- In office 17 May 1919 – 12 March 1921
- Premier: Sir James Mitchell
- Preceded by: Robert Thomson Robinson
- Succeeded by: Thomas Davy

Member of the Legislative Assembly of Western Australia
- In office 2 September 1907 – 3 October 1911
- Preceded by: Frederick Illingworth
- Succeeded by: Eben Allen
- Constituency: West Perth
- In office 29 September 1917 – 12 March 1921
- Preceded by: Eben Allen
- Succeeded by: Edith Cowan
- Constituency: West Perth

Personal details
- Born: 29 December 1864 Warrington, Lancashire, England
- Died: 11 July 1946 (aged 81) West Perth, Western Australia
- Party: Nationalist (after 1917)
- Education: Clare College, Cambridge

Thomas Percy Draper CBE KC (29 December 1864 – 11 July 1946) was an Australian lawyer, politician, and judge. He was a member of the Legislative Assembly of Western Australia from 1907 to 1911 and again from 1917 to 1921, and was attorney-general in the first government of Sir James Mitchell. He later served on the Supreme Court of Western Australia from 1921 to 1939.

== Early life ==
Draper was born in Warrington, Lancashire, England, to Annie (née Webster) and Thomas Draper, his father being a tanner. He attended Tonbridge School before going on to Clare College, Cambridge, where he graduated in 1886. Draper was called to the bar in England in 1891, as a member of the Inner Temple, but left for Western Australia the following year. He taught for a term at The High School in Perth, and then spent a period as an associate to Alfred Hensman, a judge on the Supreme Court. Draper went into private practice in 1894, and eventually became a partner in the firm of Stephen Henry Parker. He was elected to the Perth City Council in 1899, defeating Frank Wilson (a future premier), but resigned his seat in 1901.

== Parliamentary career ==
Draper entered parliament at the 1907 by-election for the seat of West Perth as a Ministerialist. The by-election had been caused by the resignation of Frederick Illingworth. He was re-elected at the 1908 state election, but did not re-contest his seat at the 1911 election, instead choosing to focus on his legal practice. He had been made King's Counsel in 1910. During the war, Draper served as chairman of the state branch of the Australian Red Cross. He returned to parliament at the 1917 state election, winning his old seat of West Perth as a Nationalist candidate. In the 1918 New Year Honours, Draper was made a Member of the Order of the British Empire (MBE) for his wartime services. He was promoted to commander of the order (CBE) in October of the same year.

In May 1919, James Mitchell replaced Hal Colebatch as premier, and promoted Draper to his new ministry as attorney-general (replacing Robert Thomson Robinson). During his term in office, he introduced legislation that liberalised Western Australia's divorce laws, and also amended the state's electoral act to allow women to stand for parliament. At the 1921 state election, Draper was opposed in West Perth by two other Nationalist candidates – Eben Allen, who had held the seat between 1911 and 1917, and Edith Cowan, one of the first five female candidates for parliament in Western Australia. Allen was eliminated on first preferences, and Cowan went on to win the seat with 50.8 percent of the two-candidate-preferred vote against Draper. She became the first female parliamentarian in Australia, while Draper became the first sitting attorney-general to lose his seat at a general election. (Note: Frederick Moorhead, attorney-general in the short-lived government of Alf Morgans, was defeated in his seat while in the ministry, but this occurred at a ministerial by-election rather than a general election.)

== Judicial career and later life ==
In April 1921, just over a month after losing his seat in parliament, Draper was nominated to the Supreme Court as a puisne justice. He replaced John Rooth, who had retired due to ill health, and joined Sir Robert McMillan (the chief justice), Robert Burnside, and John Northmore on the bench. During his time on the court, Draper dealt mainly with arbitration cases, although he did preside over some criminal trials. He announced his intention to retire early from the court in December 1938, although his actual retirement did not take effect until July 1939. The premier at the time, Labor's John Willcock, announced that he would not immediately fill the vacancy left by Draper, due to a perceived lack of need. The vacancy was in fact not filled until 1949, when Lawrence Jackson was appointed as the new fourth justice.

Draper died in Perth in July 1946, aged 81. Outside of politics and the judiciary, he had a keen interest in cricket, serving as president of the Western Australian Cricket Association (WACA) from 1924 to 1939. He was married twice, firstly to Mabel Constance Parker in 1894, with whom he had four sons and two daughters. He was widowed in 1930, and remarried the following year to Bessie Melrose Barker (née Ferguson), but was widowed a second time in 1944. Draper was related by marriage to two other prominent legal identities in Western Australia – his first wife was the daughter of Sir Stephen Henry Parker, who was chief justice between 1906 and 1913, while her sister, Rose Elizabeth Parker, married Sir Norbert Keenan, who was attorney-general between 1906 and 1909.

== Notes ==
Parliament of Western Australia
Preceded by Frederick Illingworth; Eben Allen	Member for West Perth; 1907–1911; 1917–1921	Succeeded by Eben Allen; Edith Cowan
Political offices
Preceded by Robert Robinson	Attorney-General; 1919–1921	Succeeded by Thomas Davy
