= Joseph Totterdell =

Australian politician

Sir Joseph Totterdell

Lord Mayor of Perth
- In office 24 November 1945 – 30 November 1953
- Preceded by: Sir Thomas Meagher
- Succeeded by: James Murray

Member of the Legislative Assembly of Western Australia
- In office 25 March 1950 – 14 February 1953
- Preceded by: Ross McDonald
- Succeeded by: Stanley Heal
- Constituency: West Perth

Personal details
- Born: 4 August 1885 Marple, Cheshire, England
- Died: 26 December 1959 (aged 74) Subiaco, Western Australia, Australia
- Party: Liberal

Sir Joseph Totterdell (4 August 1885 – 26 December 1959) was an Australian politician who was the Lord Mayor of Perth from 1945 to 1953. He was also a Liberal Party member of the Legislative Assembly of Western Australia from 1950 to 1953, representing the seat of West Perth.

Totterdell was born in Marple, Cheshire, England. Apprenticed to a bricklayer after leaving school, he emigrated to Australia in 1903, eventually opening a building firm with his brothers. Totterdell was elected to the City of Perth council in 1931, and served as a councillor until 1945, when he was elected lord mayor. At the 1950 state election, while still remaining lord mayor, he successfully contested the seat of West Perth for the Liberal Party, replacing a former leader of the party, Robert Ross McDonald. However, Totterdell would serve only a single term in parliament, as at the 1953 election he was defeated by the high-profile Labor candidate, Stan Heal (a former Australian rules footballer). He retired as lord mayor at the end of the same year, having been knighted in the 1953 New Year Honours.

Parliament of Western Australia
| Preceded by Ross McDonald | Member for West Perth; 1950–1953 | Succeeded by Stanley Heal |
