= Stoneface Quinlan =

American actor, model, and professional wrestler (born 1974)

John J. Quinlan
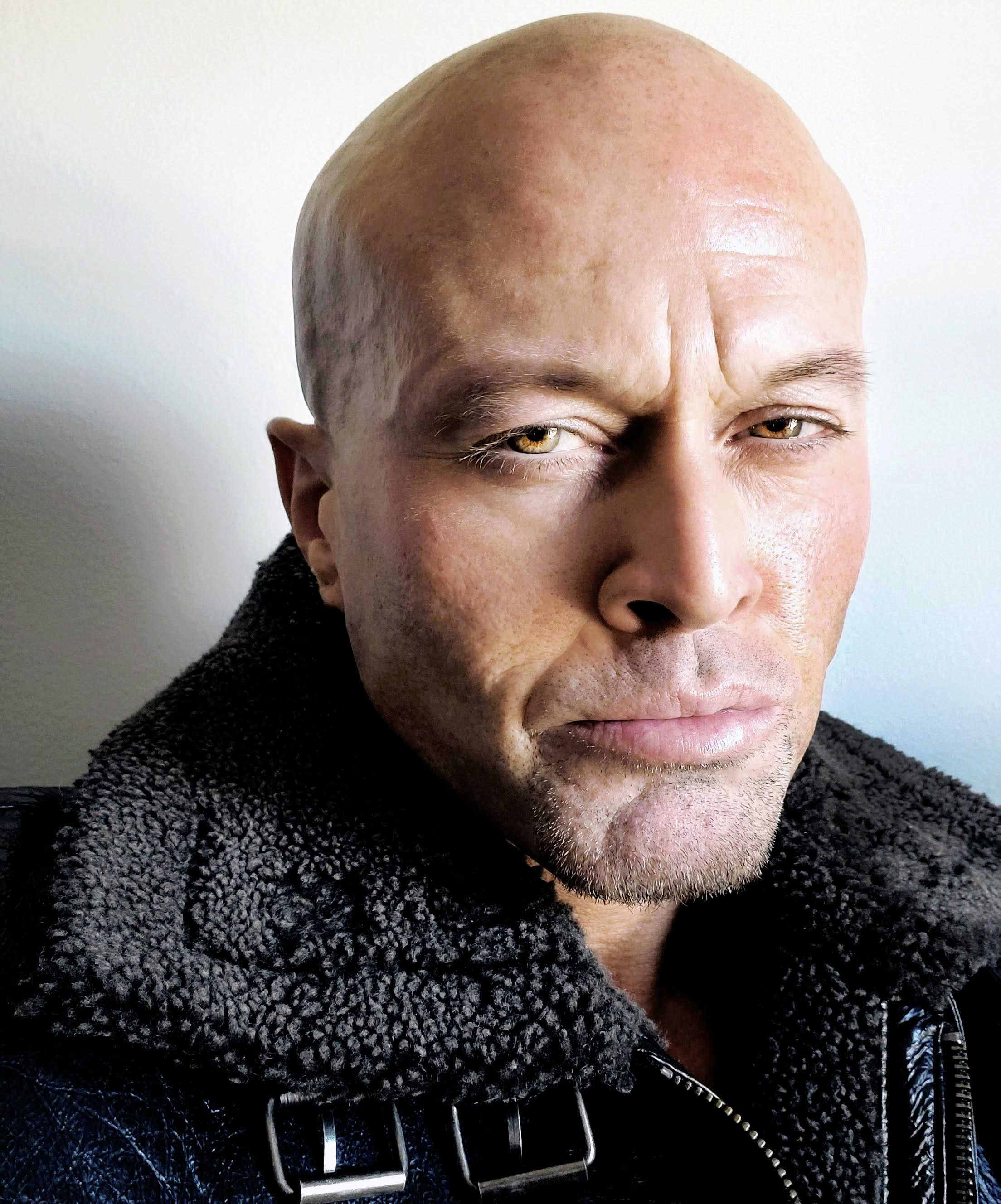
- Quinlan in 2019
- Born: October 30, 1974 (age 51); Winchester, Massachusetts, United States
- Education: Springfield College (B.Sc); Saint Leo University
- Occupations: Actor, model, professional wrestler
- Years active: 2013–present (actor); 1998–2024 (model); 1999–2002 (wrestler)
- Spouse: Jennifer MacMillan (m. 2004; div. 2017)
- Children: 3
- Professional wrestling career
- Ring name(s): Joseph Bagwell; Alex Bagwell; John Bagwell; Shane O'Kane; John Quinlan
- Billed height: 5 ft 10 in (178 cm)
- Billed weight: 230 lb (104 kg)
- Billed from: Athens, Georgia; Hell's Kitchen, New York
- Trained by: Killer Kowalski; Brutus Beefcake
- Debut: November 26, 1999
- Retired: March 1, 2002
- Website: www.johnjquinlan.com

John Joseph Quinlan (born October 30, 1974) known as Stoneface Quinlan, is an American actor. He is a former junior bodybuilder, professional wrestler, fitness model, fashion model, art model and romance cover model. In 2012 he was an official image model and brand ambassador for the supplement company Nutrabolics. Quinlan starred in the film, A Sense of Purpose: Fighting For Our Lives (2019) by producer Jillian Bullock. In 2020, he portrayed the villain role of Marvel's character Rhino for the TV/Web Series: Spider-Man And The Monsters of Manhattan. He is a born a born-again Christian.

== Career ==
Quinlan began weight training as a teenager to become stronger for sports. Shortly after graduating from Springfield College in 1997, he competed in bodybuilding, and fitness.

In 1998, Quinlan competed in the North American Bodybuilding Association (NABF). In October he placed first in the Junior Class and fourth in the Men's Open Light Heavyweight division at the NABF Tri-State Pro-Am. He won the Junior Class and earned a third-place finish in the Men's Open Light Heavyweight Division two weeks later at the NABF USA Junior Nationals. During this time Quinlan was coached by Jeff Walsh, Billy Conserva and Lawrence Cuzzi, with the assistance of Jim Cinelli, Manuel "Manny" Catalano Jr. and John Georgopolous. He was sponsored by Scott and Eric Kenworthy, owners of World Gym, Lynnfield, Massachusetts, and Pumphouse Nutrition. On November 7, 1998, at the NABF Pro-Am America Nationals and Fitness Expo held in the Veterans Memorial Auditorium in Providence, Rhode Island, Quinlan finished second overall in the Junior Class.

In February 1999, Quinlan entered the Killer Kowalski professional wrestling school in Malden, Massachusetts. During this time, Quinlan trained with April Hunter, Aaron Stevens, Wagner Brown, Christopher Nowinski and "The Boston Brawler" Jerry Bowser under the stage names John Bagwell, Joseph Bagwell, and Alex Bagwell. On November 26, 1999, in his first professional wrestling match for the World Wrestling Alliance, Quinlan teamed up with Aaron Stevens and Tre "The Smooth Operatin' Gangsta" under the name John Bagwell in a six-man tag team match in Farmington, New Hampshire.

In February 2000, Quinlan tag-teamed with bodybuilder Jerry Ward (Lucian Bagwell) for Yankee Pro Wrestling, which later became known as Top Rope Promotions. In the summer of 2000, Quinlan was briefly managed by Rocky Raymond while participating in hardcore wrestling throughout New England. On July 2, 2000, while wrestling at the Thompson International Speedway in Connecticut, Quinlan received a Powerbomb from his opponent through a table on concrete outside the ring, fracturing one of the vertebrae in his lower back. The injury took months to heal. During this time Quinlan participated in photo shoots for New England–based photographers and artists and worked as a fitness model and on one occasion modeled for the "Energy Bomb" sports drink. Quinlan often felt he was exploited by promoters who forced him to use the Alex Bagwell professional wrestling gimmick (kayfabe cousin of professional wrestler Buff Bagwell) because of his physical likeness to Buff Bagwell. Often he would receive less than half of his expected income, which would ultimately force him to drop that gimmick and wrestle under the names Shane O' Kane and John Quinlan.

In the fall of 2000, Quinlan was in contact with Joey Styles of Extreme Championship Wrestling (ECW) for a scheduled professional tryout, which never materialized. Quinlan began training at World Gym in Lynnfield, Massachusetts, with his manager, Peter Karalekas, that December.

Early in 2001, while wrestling for the National Wrestling Alliance of New England, he had a brief feud with Rick Fuller over a title shot against Fuller that ended in a loss. Shortly after, Quinlan went to Atlanta with Peter Karalekas and met with Ernest Miller, who was accompanied by Carmel Macklin and Michael Jai White about entering the World Championship Wrestling (WCW)'s Power Plant. Quinlan began using the Shane O'Kane gimmick, developed by Karalekas, at this time. The character was initially portrayed as an Irish thug from Hell's Kitchen, Manhattan, as a "heel" wearing black tights with knee-high engineer boots, but was transitioned to a masked wrestler as a "face". He began training with Edward Leslie in the summer of 2001. Quinlan and Leslie trained at World Gym in Somerville, Massachusetts and traveled together wrestling for multiple professional wrestling organizations throughout the Northeastern United States. In late August 2001 Quinlan and Leslie joined Jimmy Hart's newly founded Xcitement Wrestling Federation (XWF). Quinlan's last professional wrestling match was with an affiliation of Empire Pro Wrestling on the independent circuit in March 2002. He left the business as the result of accumulated sports related injuries he had sustained.

== Fitness and modeling competitions ==
Quinlan competed as a muscle model at the 2010 FAME World Championships "WNSO Muscle & FAME Model" and BodyProud Wellness Convention held at Bally's Las Vegas. He was sponsored by LMR Sports and Max Muscle Sports Nutrition of Saugus, Massachusetts for this event in cooperation with owner Michael Fauci, professional bodybuilder Craig Torres and Jim Castrucci. He modeled Ed Hardy and MMA Muay Thai brand apparel by Raja Boxing and Kombat Gear during this event. He was coached by Musclemania New England Bodybuilding Judge and BBPics Photography owner John Mitchell.

In June 2011, he competed as a sports model at the Musclemania Model Universe Championships as part of Musclemania's Universe Weekend in Miami. He modeled Tulio brand swimwear and clubwear by Sean John. His themewear consisted of black and gold Gladiator style Muay Thai trunks by Siamtops with Twins Special 12 oz. boxing gloves. He was one of the most tattooed models in the competition. Quinlan suffered a torn groin and grade three hamstring tear one month prior to this event.

In May 2012, Quinlan competed in two NPC Men's Physique contests. The first was the Jay Cutler Classic Men's Physique presented by GNC at John Hancock Hall in Boston. NPC coordinators measured his height as 5'9 ½", which meant he competed in the under six feet tall class. He wore Nike board shorts for this event. This show was followed by the MHP Mid Atlantic Classic Men's Physique in East Brunswick, New Jersey. This was a drug tested event, where the athletes were checked by polygraph, for performance-enhancing drugs, including diuretics, HGH, and Anabolic steroids. In June he competed in the Bev Francis Atlantic States Men's Physique at the Tribeca Theater in New York and the Rhode Island State Men's Physique at the Twin River Casino in Lincoln, Rhode Island. His best finish was a first place at the Rhode Island Championships. Quinlan was defeated by male model Anton Antipov for the title of Overall Men's Physique Champion in the judges' second call out shortly after in this contest.

In July 2012, he competed in three NPC National contests. The Team Universe Men's Physique National Championships in Teaneck, New Jersey, was followed by the MuscleTech NPC Masters Men's Physique National Championships at the Station Square Sheraton Hotel in Pittsburgh, Pennsylvania. His last contest was the NPC USA National Physique Championships held at the University of Nevada, Las Vegas. He was sponsored by Max Muscle of Saugus, Massachusetts, for this event. This was his seventh NPC contest of the year.

In April 2013, Quinlan competed at the NPC Vermont Bodybuilding Championships in the Men's Physique Division. He placed 1st in both the Men's Open and Men's Master's classes and went on to win the Overall Men's Physique Championship. He modeled trunks by Polo in this contest. In October 2013, Quinlan competed at the NPC Brooklyn Grand Prix in the Men's Physique Division. He competed in both the Men's Open and Men's Master's classes. Quinlan missed the competitor call out during the Master's Physique prejudging and was subsequently two minutes late getting on stage after the other competitors. He apologized to members of the judging panel, Matt Bristol and Mike Feulner.

In April 2014, he competed in three additional NPC Men's Physique contests with his best finish coming at the Vermont Bodybuilding Championships where he placed 2nd in the Master Physique class. In May 2014, Quinlan competed at the Jay Cutler Classic Bodybuilding Championships in Boston, Massachusetts in the Men's Physique Open and Master classes. In October 2014, Quinlan competed at the NPC Brooklyn Grand Prix for the second year in a row in both the Men's Open and Master Physique Divisions. In November 2014, he competed at the NPC New England Championships in the Men's Open and Master Physique Divisions.

In March 2015, Quinlan competed at the Ninth-Annual Arnold Classic Amateur NPC/IFBB International Bodybuilding, Fitness, Figure, Bikini and Men's Physique Championships held at the Greater Columbus Convention Center as part of the Arnold Sports Festival in the Open Men's Physique class. He also competed at the NPC Montanari Bros Powerhouse Classic in New Haven, Connecticut in both the Open and Master's Physique classes. In April 2015, he competed in four additional NPC contests. The Steve Stone Metropolitan Men's Physique Championships in Teaneck, New Jersey followed by the NPC John Kemper Classic in Elmwood Park, New Jersey and the NPC Vermont Championships. The last contest was the First-Annual NPC NY Capitol Championships in Albany, New York. His best finish came at the New York Capitol Championships where he placed first in the Master Physique division. He was sponsored by Max Muscle of Saugus, Massachusetts, for these events.

In May 2015, Quinlan competed at the Jay Cutler Classic Bodybuilding Championships in Boston, Massachusetts in the Men's Physique Open and Master classes. In June 2015, he competed in two additional NPC contests in the Men's Physique Open and Master classes. The Bev Francis Atlantic States Championships in New York, New York and the Connecticut Grand Prix. On July 4, 2015, Quinlan competed at the NPC Universe Championships in Teaneck, New Jersey in the Men's Physique Open and Master classes. On July 5, 2015, he officially announced his retirement as a physique competitor in the National Physique Committee.

== Modeling career ==
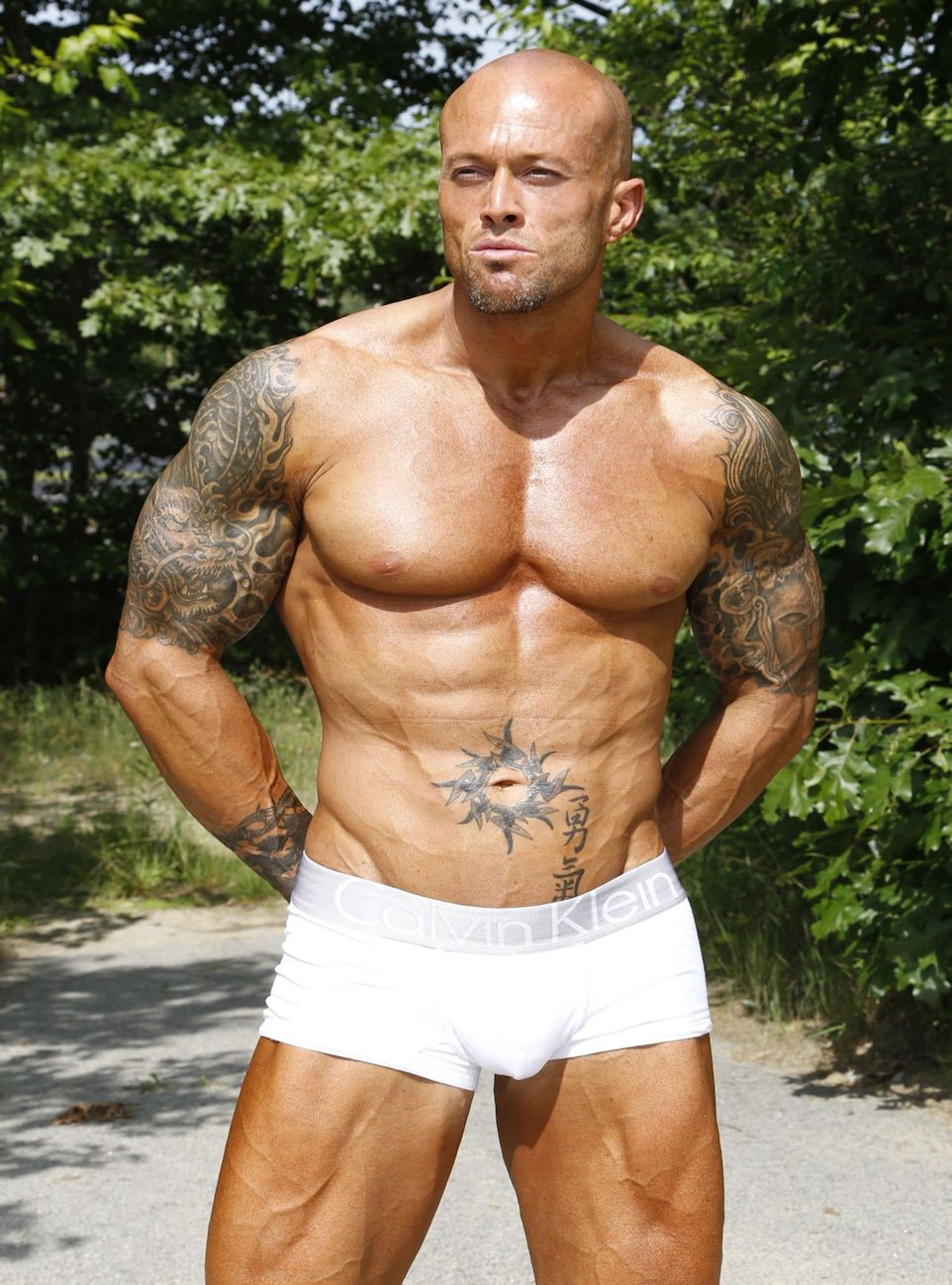
John Quinlan in 2012

Quinlan was used in 2000 as an art model by Brian Dow, an illustrator of children's books, book covers, advertising and editorial illustration for a self-promotion piece inspired by Harry Potter and author J.K. Rowling. Dow used Quinlan's physique in a digital painting and colored pencil illustration as the body of an evil troll. The image was also used on the cover of the paperback book "The War of Trolls" (Scream Shop Series #8) by Tracey West, illustrated by Dow. Quinlan modeled for Dow as a genie in a similar illustration later that year. Quinlan arm wrestled Chad Eaton, defensive tackle in the National Football League for the New England Patriots, in 2000 while working at the Boston nightclub The Rack as a bouncer. He also modeled for Sandra Kimball Photography for an outdoor professional wrestling themed photo shoot.

He has appeared and had his image used in many online publications, supplement and fitness articles, and magazines. In 2010, Quinlan was represented by Coach Models International Model Agency of New York.

In February 2011, Quinlan was named January fashion model of the month by HUF Magazine and he was interviewed by host Claudia Reid of Muscle Talk Radio 101 in New York.

He is an official ambassador of Diego Barberi brand apparel in the United States and a spokesmodel for Toot brand apparel in Japan and Asia. In September, Quinlan was selected to join VIP Exclusive Fashion Models Company by President Leslie M. Weston and CEO Terrance L. Shaw and appeared in Faith & Fitness Magazine with his son Troy. In October 2011, he signed as an associate to help promote BodHD, Inc., a nutrition company based in Vista, California.

In April 2012, Quinlan was named official image model of the year for No Limits Brand Underwear by Suzanne Carner.

In August 2012, Quinlan was used as the likeness for the character of Master Buck in the erotic romance story Master's Email by Tonya Kinzer. He has appeared on the cover of two fiction books, Captive Fantasy and Fierce in Fur.

In February 2013, Quinlan was the cover model for the book, Jessica's Obsession. In April 2013, Quinlan was named an Official Image Model of Alpha Male Underwear by Darrell MacDonald and Thanos Giagtzis and was the cover model for the book, "Groupie". In June 2013, Quinlan was signed by designer Claudia McKinney as an official Phatpuppy cover model. He was also nominated for Playgirl's Hunk of The Month. Quinlan has modeled products and brands of apparel for Perry Ellis, Energy Bomb Sports Drink, Truly Huge, JUSTUS Clothing Co., Joe Snyder, XWear, Teamm8, Male Basics, Muchachomalo (Netherlands), Croota, Tribe (Australia), Sweat Collection, DMK, 4Skins, Modus Vivendi by Christos Bibitsos (Greece), Xzytes, Toot (Tokyo, Japan), Ergowear (Santiago, Chile), Diego Barberi (Switzerland), Audace, Dietz, Way Funky Co., Men's Fit, Man by Peter Morrissey, Unapproved Clothing Co., Tiger Underwear, Boqari, BIG BOYS, Stunt Gear Inc., HOM, The Todd Sanfield Collection, Nutrabolics, No Limits Underwear, Athletic Xtreme Supplement Company, Swole Gym Gear, Ken Fron Jewelry and Tulalip Casino.

In 2014, Quinlan was a featured model in Duemila Magazine of Italy in January and November.

In June 2016, Quinlan was selected as the cover model for the Blushing Books Publications 'Hero To Obey' military book box set.

== Actor ==
He can be seen in the New England Sports Network documentary Ringmasters: Pro Wrestling in New England (2000) produced by Jim Carroll and in the MSNBC Investigates documentary Body of Work (2001), filmed while he was training at Killer Kowalski's Professional Wrestling School. In December 2001, Quinlan and Brutus "The Barber" Beefcake appeared in a TV commercial for World Gym of Lynnfield, Massachusetts.

Quinlan portrayed a mobster with a good heart in a video short included in Poughkeepsie Enhanced Collector's Edition released in Fall 2013.

In December 2015, Quinlan was signed on as an actor to play the role of United States Army Captain Jake Nixon for the 2019 movie production, A Sense of Purpose: Fighting For Our Lives by producer and director Jillian Bullock. Filming began in Philadelphia during September 2016.

In September 2017, Quinlan was the featured actor in the A Sense of Purpose: Fighting For Our Lives movie music video Calm Down by Antonia Marquee.

In December 2017, Quinlan was featured on a television interview for the show, Philly On The Rise.

In April 2018, Quinlan portrayed a mixed martial arts boxer in a television commercial for Tulalip Resort Casino.

On July 2, 2018, A Sense of Purpose: Fighting For Our Lives movie music video Fight of Your Life by Yashar was released. Quinlan portrayed the character of United States Army Captain Jake Nixon in the music video.

In September 2018, Quinlan received a Best Actor Award for his role as United States Army Captain Jake Nixon in the film A Sense of Purpose: Fighting For Our Lives at the Validate Yourself Film Festival in Brooklyn, NY.

On April 25, 2019, A Sense of Purpose: Fighting For Our Lives premiered at the Start Cinema & Cafe in Brooklyn, NY. Colonel Annette Tucker Osborne, President of The National Association of Black Military Women, Brooklyn Chapter awarded Quinlan the Challenge coin for his role in the film. During an interview with Conversations Radio Network President Cyrus Webb at the event, Quinlan credited Sylvester Stallone as his biggest inspiration as an actor.

In May 2019, during a Philly On The Rise television interview, host Michael Pleasant discussed the meaning behind Quinlan's nickname Stoneface which he earned the over the years from all the people who say he never smiles.

Quinlan was a Massachusetts State Trooper in the season 1 finale episode of City on a Hill, Mayor Curley and the Last Hurrah on Showtime.

Quinlan was an associate producer and played the role of CIA agent Harrison McConnell in the short film, Touch With Your Eyes (2019) directed and produced by Jillian Bullock.

On February 18, 2020, Quinlan was selected to play the villain role of Marvel Rhino aka Aleksei Sytsevich for the TV/Web Series: Spider-Man And The Monsters of Manhattan set to be released in 2024. Quinlan's version of Rhino was based on actor Paul Giamatti's portrayal of Aleksei Sytsevich in The Amazing Spider-Man 2 (2014). Fellow actor Jamie Costa depicts a villain role as well in the series as The Shocker (Herman Schultz).

On August 11, 2020, A Sense of Purpose: Fighting For Our Lives was released on Amazon Prime Video.

On September 21, 2020, he was chosen to play the role of an intimidating security guard in the short film, Quartette by Bianca Sanchez and director Jon Barden.

Quinlan was featured in the music video, Lookin’ Like My Wife by Brian Walker released in October 2022.

In November 2022, Quinlan was selected for the role as Detective Decker Monroe in Jillian Bullock's upcoming film, A Cup Full of Crazy. He is also an associate producer.

He appeared as a bouncer in the premiere episode of Boston Blue, “Faith and Family” on CBS.

== Other media ==
- On April 6, 2010, Quinlan was interviewed by Steve Shaw of Muscle and Strength.com. He was the first audio podcast athlete interview conducted on the site.
- Cover model for Issue 108 of 2BExposed Magazine in 2011
- Asia Chic 2011 GQ Profile calendar model
- Truly Huge apparel
- Inkubator Comics
- Quinlan was part of the PR team for the movie Hedda (Hedda Gabler), a 2012 film adaptation of the classic Henrik Ibsen stage play produced in the United Kingdom by British director Matthew John.
- On June 28, 2013, Quinlan appeared on Renegade Talk FM of Maui, Hawaii with Erotic Romance Author Leanna Harrow.

== Fiction ==
Quinlan is the inspiration for the character "Kennealy" in the science fiction short story Synaesthesia by AmyBeth Inverness. The story tells of human's early research and trials in time travel. Kennealy is a chrononaut who makes non-corporeal jaunts through time. Since the process causes disorientation and disturbance in the chrononaut's sensory inputs, the fact that Kennealy is a synaesthete is a great advantage. Quinlan's image, including his tattoos, is used to illustrate the story.

Quinlan was the inspiration for a short story published by Cassandra Carr titled "Birthday Boy". "Birthday Boy" was released December 7, 2012, through Ellora's Cave Publishing.

Quinlan was the cover model and inspiration for the character, Zane (A Dragon Shifter), in the Award Winning, Urban Fantasy/Norse Mythology Romance novel by Author Jennifer Sage titled, "The Last Valkyrie." The cover artist, Claudia McKinney with Phatpuppy Art Studios, did an impeccable job at capturing the features needed for "Zane" through Quinlan's physique, which was a perfect match. The full-length novel is book one in a trilogy and was released on February 14, 2016.

== Personal life ==
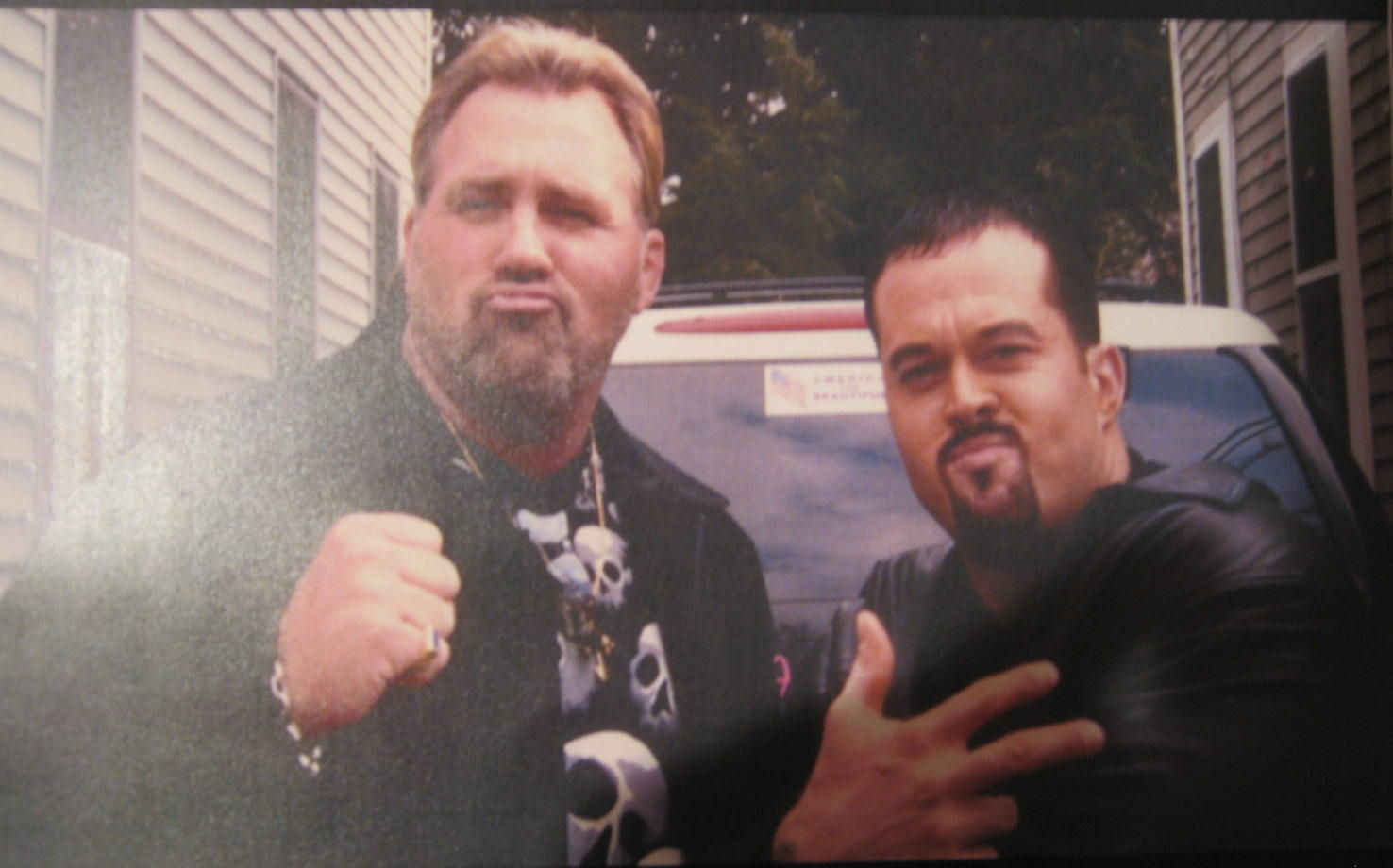
Quinlan and Brutus "The Barber" Beefcake in 2001

Quinlan has been referred to as the most tattooed male romance cover model in the world. Quinlan has numerous tattoos, most with an Oriental and Celtic cross theme. The tattoos include two half-sleeve tattoos, seven Kanji characters that are used in the modern Japanese logographic writing system and four nautical stars. A tribal shamrock tattoo was acquired after he obtained permission from retired mixed martial arts fighter Frank Shamrock. On July 13, 2013, Quinlan was tattooed by American artist Matt Myrdal with his fifth nautical star. A few months later in December, he was tattooed again by Myrdal which included an additional 4 nautical stars among others. In May 2014, Quinlan had 3 additional nautical stars tattooed on the back of his neck. In July 2016, American tattoo artist Jon Saulnier tattooed a cross on Quinlan's lower left abdomen. He currently sports twenty eight individual tattoos.

Quinlan used to be a vegan. He suffers from extreme migraine headaches.

Quinlan is friends with fellow professional wrestler Brutus "The Barber" Beefcake and former cruiserweight professional boxer Richie Lamontagne.

Quinlan's father, Shaun Quinlan, played for the Boston University Terriers men's ice hockey team during the 1964–1965 and 1965–1966 seasons wearing number 17. Quinlan's grandfather, William John Quinlan, played Irish football and was an amateur boxer trained by Johnny Buckley in the 1930s. Quinlan's second cousin, Kevin Quinlan, backed up tailback Marcel Shipp in 1998 and 1999 while playing football for the University of Massachusetts.

John "Stoneface" Quinlan became a born-again Christian at 50 years old, and his faith was strongly reinforced after the unexpected and tragic death of his 48-year-old younger brother, Brian, of a heart attack on May 17, 2025. This crushing loss led him to realize his need for God, his own vulnerability, and that life is fragile.

== Fitness competition history ==
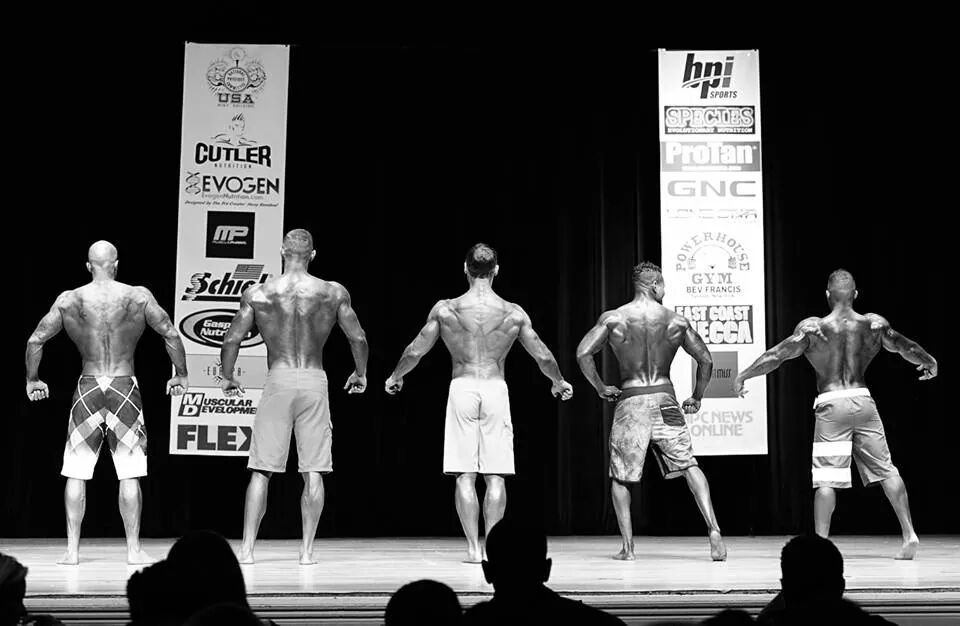
Top 5 Men's Physique Master competitors on stage at the 2014 NPC Jay Cutler Classic, John Quinlan #208 (far left)

- 1998 NABF Tri-State Pro-Am – Junior – 1st
- 1998 NABF Tri-State Pro-Am – Light Heavyweight – 4th
- 1998 NABF USA Junior Nationals – Junior – 1st
- 1998 NABF USA Junior Nationals – Light Heavyweight – 3rd
- 1998 NABF Pro-Am America Nationals – Junior – 2nd
- 2010 Fitness Star Model Search World Championship – Level 3 Muscular Fitness Model – —4th
- 2010 FAME Las Vegas World Championships – Open Muscle Model – 2nd
- 2011 Musclemania Model Universe Championships – Male Sports Model – 72nd
- 2012 NPC Jay Cutler Classic Men's Physique Championships – 4th^{*}
- 2012 NPC Mid Atlantic Classic Men's Physique Championships – 9th
- 2012 NPC Bev Francis Atlantic States Men's Physique Championships – 11th
- 2012 NPC Rhode Island State Men's Physique Championships – 1st^{†}
- 2012 NPC Team Universe Men's Physique National Championships – 16th
- 2012 NPC Masters Men's Physique National Championships – 11th
- 2012 NPC USA Men's Physique National Championships – 16th
- 2013 NPC Vermont Men's Physique Championships – 1st^{**}
- 2013 NPC Vermont Men's Physique Master's Championships – 1st
- 2013 NPC Vermont Men's Physique Overall Champion^{††}
- 2013 NPC Grand Prix of Brooklyn Men's Physique Championships – 13th
- 2013 NPC Grand Prix of Brooklyn Men's Physique Master's Championships – 7th
- 2014 NPC Montanari Bros Powerhouse Classic Men's Physique Championships – 9th
- 2014 NPC Montanari Bros Powerhouse Classic Men's Physique Master's Championships – 3rd
- 2014 NPC Steve Stone Metropolitans Men's Physique Championships – 15th
- 2014 NPC Steve Stone Metropolitans Men's Physique Master's Championships – 4th
- 2014 NPC Vermont Men's Physique Championships – 4th
- 2014 NPC Vermont Men's Physique Master's Championships – 2nd^{***}
- 2014 NPC Jay Cutler Classic Men's Physique Championships – 9th
- 2014 NPC Jay Cutler Classic Men's Physique Master's Championships – 5th
- 2014 NPC Grand Prix of Brooklyn Men's Physique Championships – 9th
- 2014 NPC Grand Prix of Brooklyn Men's Physique Master's Championships – 5th
- 2014 NPC New England Men's Physique Championships – 8th
- 2014 NPC New England Men's Physique Master's Championships – 3rd
- 2015 IFBB Arnold Classic Amateur Men's Physique Championships – 25th
- 2015 NPC Montanari Bros Powerhouse Classic Men's Physique Championships – 8th
- 2015 NPC Montanari Bros Powerhouse Classic Men's Physique Master's Championships – 5th
- 2015 NPC Steve Stone Metropolitans Men's Physique Championships – 8th
- 2015 NPC Steve Stone Metropolitans Men's Physique Master's Championships – 15th
- 2015 NPC John Kemper Classic Men's Physique Championships – 10th
- 2015 NPC John Kemper Classic Men's Physique Master's Championships – 4th
- 2015 NPC Vermont Men's Physique Championships – 2nd
- 2015 NPC Vermont Men's Physique Master's Championships – 2nd^{†††}
- 2015 NPC New York Capitol Men's Physique Championships – 6th
- 2015 NPC New York Capitol Men's Physique Master's Championships – 1st^{†††}
- 2015 NPC Jay Cutler Classic Men's Physique Championships – 6th
- 2015 NPC Jay Cutler Classic Men's Physique Master's Championships – 5th
- 2015 NPC Bev Francis Atlantic States Men's Physique Championships – 16th
- 2015 NPC Bev Francis Atlantic States Men's Physique Master's Championships – 11th
- 2015 NPC Grand Prix of Connecticut Men's Physique Championships – 10th
- 2015 NPC Grand Prix of Connecticut Men's Physique Master's Championships – 3rd
- 2015 NPC Universe Men's Physique Championships – 16th
- 2015 NPC Universe Men's Physique Master's Over 35 Championships – 10th
- 2015 NPC Universe Men's Physique Master's Over 40 Championships – 8th
- ^{*}Qualified for 2012 NPC Team Universe Men's Physique National Championships
- ^{†}Qualified for 2012 NPC USA Men's Physique National Championships
- ^{**}Qualified for 2013 NPC USA Men's Physique National Championships
- ^{††}Qualified for 2013 NPC Men's Physique National Championships
- ^{***}Qualified for 2014 NPC Men's Master Physique National Championships
- ^{†††}Qualified for 2015 NPC Men's Master Physique National Championships

== Championships and accomplishments ==
- IIXtreme
  - IIXtreme Hardcore Champion (2000)
  - IIXtreme Heavyweight Champion (2000)

== Filmography ==
=== Film ===
Denotes lead role

Title	Year	Role	Notes
A Sense Of Purpose: Fighting For Our Lives	2019	Jake Nixon	Army Captain

=== Television ===
Title	Year	Role	Network	Notes
Ringmasters	2000	Professional wrestler	NESN	Episode: "Pro Wrestling in New England"
MSNBC Investigates	2001	Professional wrestler	MSNBC	Episode: "Body of Work"
City on a Hill	2019	Massachusetts State Trooper (uncredited)	Showtime	S1, Ep10: "Mayor Curley and the Last Hurrah"
Marvel Adventures: Spider-Man and the Monsters of Manhattan	2021	Aleksei Sytsevich / Rhino		Fan TV-Series
Boston Blue	2025	Bouncer (uncredited)	CBS	S1, Ep1: "Faith and Family"
Widow's Bay	2026	Dock Worker (uncredited)	Apple TV	S1, Ep1: "Welcome to Widow's Bay"

=== Voice work ===
Title	Year	Role	Network / Platform	Notes
Scream	2024	Ghostface (voice)	Bentley University	Directed by Raul Morales Cestero

=== Short film ===
Title	Year	Role	Notes
Touch With Your Eyes	2019	Harrison McConnell	
Knockout Girls	2020	John Q.	Himself
Quartette	2021	Security Guard	
K.O.	2024	Hitman	
Jamboy	2026	Guard	

=== Other work ===
Title	Year	Type	Role
World Gym Lynnfield	2001	Commercial	Fitness model
Return To Poughkeepsie	2013	Web Series E-book	Beckett Taylor
Tulalip Casino	2018	Commercial	Fighter

=== Music videos ===
Title	Year	Role
Calm Down (Lullaby)	2017	Jake Nixon
Fight Of Your Life	2018	Jake Nixon
Red Flags	2023	Himself
Lookin' Like My Wife	2022	Himself
Before the Roof Caves In	2024	Henchman
Imma Get Mine	2025	Reporter
Pillars	2025	Funeral Attendee

== See also ==
- List of people from Boston
- List of male underwear models
- List of people from Massachusetts
- Springfield College Notable alumni and faculty
- List of Notable people with the surname Quinlan
- List of professional wrestlers trained by Killer Kowalski
