= Fanny Breckler =

Australian philanthropist and businesswoman

Fanny Sarah Breckler (1877 – 9 December 1946) was a philanthropist and founder of the Western Australian shoe retailer Betts & Betts.

== Early life ==
Breckler was the daughter of Joseph and Bella Masel. She was born in Minsk, Russian Empire, in 1877. She came to Western Australia in 1889, and married Yoel Breckler in 1897. Yoel, also a Russian immigrant, ran a shoe repair business in Fremantle. They had four children before Breckler was widowed in 1912.

== Business ==
Breckler and her sons, Cecil and Alec, took over Yoel's business, Breckler Brothers. They decided to expand into retailing, and opened a store, The Dainty Walk, on Hay Street in the Perth central business district.

Breckler was successful in business, developing a chain of stores that became one of the largest in Australia by the 1940s. The business has been known by the names Cecil Brothers, Betts & Betts, and most recently Betts.

== Personal life and other roles ==
Breckler was a long-time president of the National Council of Jewish Women in Western Australia, and involved with Jewish and patriotic charities.

The Brecklers became one of the richest families in Australia, and one of the few wealthy Jewish families not from Melbourne or Sydney.

Breckler had a mansion built in 1935. It included a ballroom with a stage, and was listed on the City of Stirling's Municipal Inventory on 11 June 1997.

Breckler died on 9 December 1946. A memorial service was held the next day at the Perth Hebrew Congregation synagogue, attended by approximately 600 people. That was followed by a funeral at the Jewish section of Karrakatta Cemetery – one of the largest ever held there at the time – where Breckler was buried.

== Legacy ==
Breckler's estate was valued at over £44,600. While most was left to her family and friends, bequests of £100 were made to the W.A. Jewish Philanthropic Society and the Children's Hospital, and the W.A. Institute for the Blind, W.A. Adult Deaf and Dumb Society, Parkerville Children's Home, Children's Protection Society, and Home of Peace each received £50.

Breckler was recognised as one of the most influential Western Australian businesspeople in The West Australian's 2013 list of the 100 most influential.
