= Thomas Davy (politician) =

Australian politician

Thomas Arthur Lewis "Tad" Davy (1 May 1890 – 18 February 1933) was an Australian lawyer and politician who served as Attorney-General and Minister for Education of Western Australia.

== Biography ==
Thomas Davy was born on 1 May 1890 in Auckland, New Zealand, the eldest son of a doctor, Thomas George Davy, and his wife Emily, née Gates. The family moved to London in 1894 before migrating to Western Australia in 1895. Dr Thomas Davy practised medicine firstly at Coolgardie, then Fremantle and West Perth.

Davy went to school at Coolgardie, then in Fremantle and at the High School, Perth (now Hale School), where in 1909 he received a Rhodes scholarship. He left to study law at Exeter College in Oxford, before being called to the bar at Gray's Inn in 1913. The following year he returned to Western Australia, practising law for a time.

In February 1915 Davy joined the Royal Field Artillery and served in France from May 1915 until he was wounded in action in September 1916. Davy continued his service in India until 1919. On 21 December 1915 Davy married Penelope Ethel, daughter of Horatio William Sholl, a Western Australian politician.

At the end of World War I he returned to Western Australia and resumed his law practice, subsequently becoming a partner in the legal firm of Northmore, Hale, Davy and Leake, and was appointed a King's Counsel in March 1932. Davy sat on the High School's Board of Governors from 1920 and as its chairman in 1929 instigated the change in the school's name to Hale School.

In 1924 Davy was endorsed by the Nationalist Party to contest the Legislative Assembly seat of West Perth, against the sitting member Edith Cowan, who was herself a Nationalist. It was not unusual at the time for the Nationalist Party to endorse more than one candidate for a seat, but in this case Cowan was seen as unreliable in her support for the "party line", and the party devoted most of its resources to the election of Davy. Davy narrowly won the seat. He was re-elected in 1927, again against Cowan, who contested the seat as a Women's Electoral League candidate, and again in 1930.

On 29 April 1930 Davy was appointed as Attorney-General and in October 1931 also took on the position of Minister for Education. In 1932 he was also made the Minister for the North-West. He was deputy leader of the Nationalist Party from 1927 to 1933, and was acting Premier on several occasions during the absence of Sir James Mitchell.

On 18 February 1933 Davy died unexpectedly of a heart attack while playing cards with close friends at the Savoy Hotel. His widow, two daughters and a son survived him. Davy was buried at Karrakatta Cemetery. Despite being a lawyer, King's Counsel and the attorney-general, Davy died intestate, leaving an estate worth £8,946.

== Legacy ==
A memorial aviary, designed by Harold Boas, was constructed at the Perth Zoo and named after him, and a street in Wembley Downs is named after him.
