= Betts Group =

Australian footwear retailer

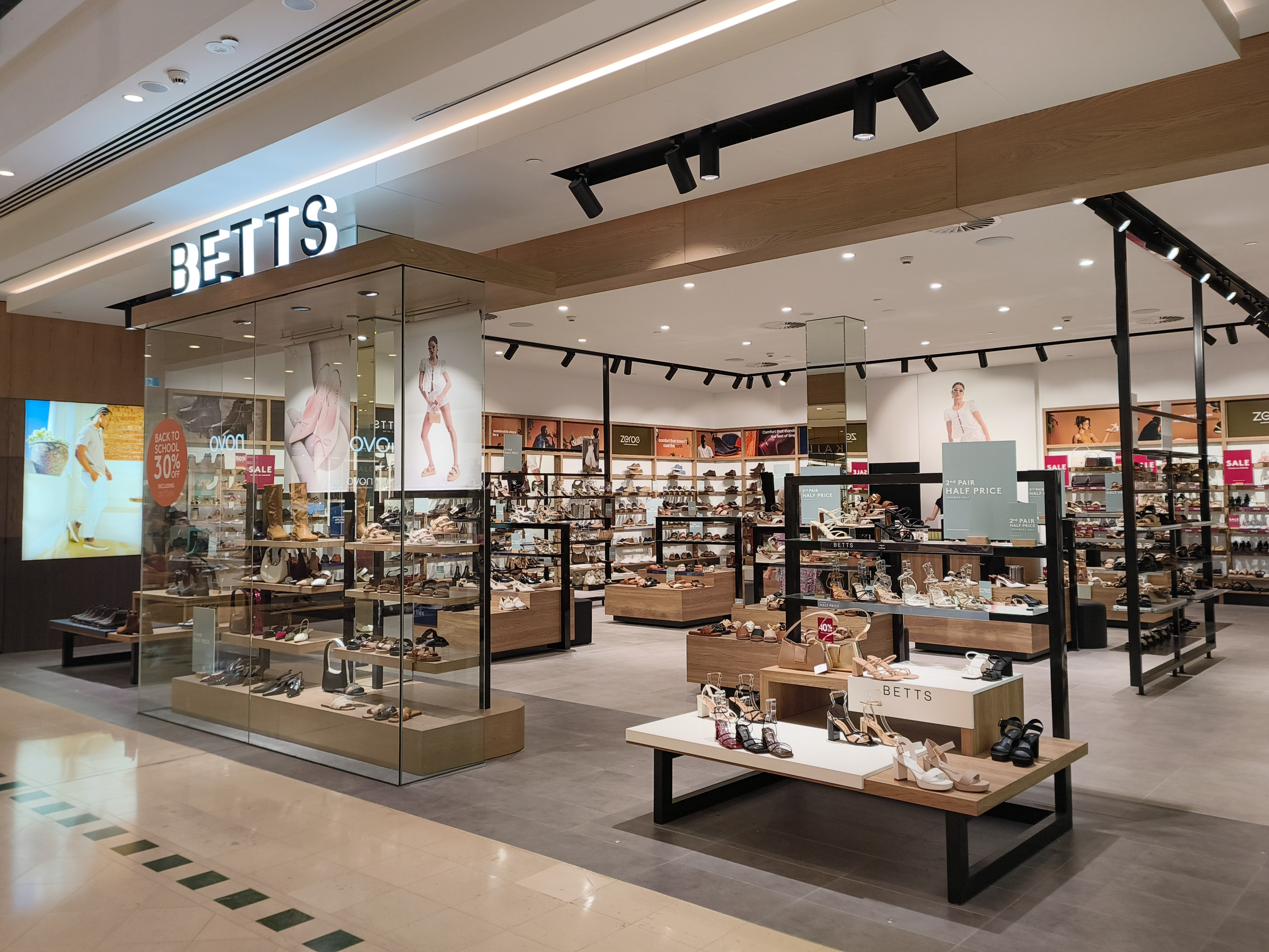
Betts store in Karrinyup Shopping Centre

Betts Group Pty Ltd, formerly Breckler Brothers and Cecil Bros Pty Ltd, is an Australian footwear retailer based in Perth. Founded in 1892, the Betts Group owns the brands Betts (formerly Betts & Betts), Betts Kids (formerly Betts & Betts Kids), ZU, Airflex, Zeroe, Betts Brand Direct, Betts for Her. As of June 2026, Betts had 35 stores across Australia.

== History ==
Yoel Breckler, a Russian immigrant, founded the boot repair store Breckler Brothers in Fremantle, Western Australia in 1892. This family business that he had established was continued by his wife Fanny Breckler (née Masel, 1877–1942) and two sons, Cecil and Alec, after his death in 1912. Fanny opened her first shoe store in Hay Street, Perth in the 1920s, named The Dainty Walk.

The company has since changed its name at various times in its long history, including Cecil Bros, and Betts. In 1985, Andrew and Danny Breckler took over the family's business. The recent introduction of major suburban retail shopping centres had brought in competition from both national and international players. This development had created a difficult situation for local retailers, and put pressure on sales and margins. To combat this, Andrew started to expand the operations into the states of Victoria, New South Wales and the Northern Territory, with the aid of numerous acquisitions the company had made in the 1980s and early 1990s. During this time, Andrew helped the company become the "largest privately owned footwear group in Australia". In the 1980s, the company opened dedicated children's footwear stores called Betts Kids.

At the beginning of the 21st century, Danny, who was faced with a second surge of increased competition, repositioned the Betts Group, thereby changing it into a "vertically integrated business that could design and source its own products". The brand Zu Shoes was established in March 2003, and Danny soon started designing and developing footwear products and accessories for manufacture in China. To reduce the level of third-party involvement in acquiring product from Chinese manufacturers, he also developed the Betts Group China Resource Centre, which handled quality control and transportation. In 2008, the company launched standalone Airflex stores followed by standalone Betts for Her stores in 2010.

In 2018, Betts Group announced it would close or sell 69 of its 170 stores. This included the closure of all Betts Kids stores and the sale of 22 Betts and Airflex locations to the Munro Footwear Group in March 2018.

In late 2025, Betts underwent a rebrand, shifting its focus to women's footwear and accessories only. In July 2026, Betts announced it had entered administration and would close 20 of its 35 stores. The company also said it would transition to eventually become an online-only business.

== Operations ==
The Betts Group is now run by the fifth generation of the family. The head office is located in Osborne Park, Western Australia. The two-storey, 1,500 m^{2} (16,000 sq ft) office was awarded the Best New Commercial project under $5 million in Western Australia for 2006 by the MBA.

Betts has stores in every Australian state and territory, offices in Western Australia, South Australia, Victoria and China, and a franchise store in the United Arab Emirates. The various brands reach a range of different demographics in society: children's shoes (Betts Kids), premium men and women's fashion footwear and accessories (Zu), and contemporary comfort/technological men's and women's fashion shoes (Airflex). Betts, which caters for people seeking contemporary affordable men and women's dress and casual footwear and accessories, has in some locations been replaced by Betts for Her, a variant of the Betts brand that stocks female-targeted products only. The Betts for Her debut store was at Westfield Burwood in 2012. Numerous international companies order Betts-designed shoes. Over 130 independent retailers in Australia now stock Airflex shoes. Many of the shoes are designed and manufactured by Betts themselves, and this is done to allow them to oversee the quality of the production throughout the entire process.

The business is built on a financial model based on 98% shoe and 2% handbag sales. The business, which is 100% retail, does not manufacture any of its products, and instead imports its footwear and other accessories from overseas suppliers.

Betts' website allows purchases online.

== See also ==
- List of oldest companies in Australia
