= Electoral district of West Perth =

Former state electoral district of Perth, Western Australia

West Perth Western Australia—Legislative Assembly
- State: Western Australia
- Dates current: 1890–1962
- Namesake: West Perth

The Electoral district of West Perth was a Legislative Assembly electorate in the state of Western Australia. The district was named for its location immediately to the west of the central business district of Perth.

West Perth was created as one of the initial 30 single-member districts, and one of only six in the Perth-Fremantle area, and its first member, elected in 1890, was Timothy Quinlan, a Perth city councillor and publican at the Shamrock Hotel. Quinlan became embroiled in a controversy regarding provision of state aid to private schools, which he and fellow Catholic MLAs Thomas Molloy and Alfred Canning supported. The Catholic Vicar General, Father Anselm Bourke, established the Education Defence League with their assistance. However, the issue became a major one in the 1894 election amongst the voting public, and all three MLAs lost their seats, Quinlan losing to former Fremantle mayor Barrington Wood.

George Leake defeated Wood in the 1901 election. Leake, a former opposition leader, was able to form government, and became the third Premier of Western Australia.

The seat was held by several other notable members, including the first female member of any Australian Parliament, Edith Cowan, from 1921. It was later held by Thomas Davy, Attorney General in the second Mitchell government, who was widely considered to be leadership material until his early death in 1933 (while playing cards at the Savoy Hotel). Between 1938 and 1946, it was held by Robert Ross McDonald, the leader of the Nationalist Party, one of the key architects of the Western Australian division of the Liberal Party, (established in 1945).

The seat was generally safe for non-Labor candidates and parties throughout its existence, although a redistribution following the abolition of the seat of Perth prior to the 1950 election, which extended the seat east to Barrack Street, enabled Labor to hold the seat for its final three terms. Its final member, Stanley Heal, successfully transferred to the recreated seat of Perth following West Perth's abolition in a redistribution in 1961 ahead of the 1962 election.

== Members for West Perth ==
Member	Party	Term
Timothy Quinlan	Non-aligned	1890–1894
Barrington Wood	Ministerialist	1894–1901
George Leake	Oppositionist	1901–1902
Charles Moran	Independent	1902–1905
Frederick Illingworth	Ministerialist	1905–1907
Thomas Draper	Ministerialist	1907–1911
Eben Allen	Liberal	1911–1917
Thomas Draper	Nationalist	1917–1921
Edith Cowan	Nationalist	1921–1924
Thomas Davy	Nationalist	1924–1933
Robert Ross McDonald	Nationalist	1933–1945
Robert Ross McDonald	Liberal	1945–1949
Robert Ross McDonald	Liberal Country League	1949–1950
Joseph Totterdell	Liberal Country League	1950–1953
Stanley Heal	Labor	1953–1962
