= Patrick Quinlan (cricketer) =

Australian cricketer and lawyer

Personal information
- Full name: Patrick Francis Quinlan
- Born: 17 March 1891; Perth, Western Australia
- Died: 15 August 1935 (aged 44); Perth, Western Australia
- Batting: Right-handed
- Bowling: Right-arm medium
- Role: Batsman
- Relatives: Timothy Quinlan (father); Bernard Quinlan (brother)

Domestic team information
- Years: Team
- 1912: Woodbrook C&G
- 1912–1914: Ireland
- 1925/26–1928/29: Western Australia

Career statistics
Competition	First-class
Matches	13
Runs scored	530
Batting average	26.50
100s/50s	0/4
Top score	80
Balls bowled	884
Wickets	10
Bowling average	53.00
5 wickets in innings	0
10 wickets in match	0
Best bowling	2/38
Catches/stumpings	8/–
- Source: CricketArchive, 26 October 2011

Patrick Francis Quinlan (17 March 1891 – 15 August 1935) was an Australian cricketer and lawyer. The son of Timothy Quinlan, an Irish-born politician, Quinlan was educated in Ireland where he played cricket for Dublin University and Ireland. He returned to Western Australia in 1920 to practise law, and also played several cricket matches for the Western Australia cricket team. He died in 1935 after a long illness.

== Career ==
Quinlan was born on 17 March 1891 in Perth, Western Australia, to Timothy Francis Quinlan and Teresa Connor. His father had served as Speaker of the Western Australian Legislative Assembly, while his maternal grandfather, Daniel Connor, was a noted businessman. Quinlan was sent to Ireland at age 15 to attend Clongowes Wood College, along with his older brother, Bernard Gerald Quinlan, who was studying medicine at Trinity College Dublin. He was accepted into Trinity College Dublin in 1910. His education was interrupted by the First World War, and he returned to Perth, but Quinlan returned to Dublin to finish his degree after the war, subsequently graduating with a Bachelor of Arts in 1920.

Quinlan took up playing cricket while in Ireland, making his debut for the Dublin University Cricket Club in 1911. He soon established himself in the first XI, and played for the club against a full Hampshire side in May 1911, alongside his brother. Playing mainly as an opening batsman, he was also a useful medium-pace bowler in his early days, with a best of 7/20 from 15.3 overs against a team from County Cork. Quinlan made his first-class debut for a Woodbrook Club and Ground side against the touring South Africans. Three days later, he was selected to make his debut for the Irish cricket team against the South Africans, scoring two runs and a duck in the first and second innings, respectively, playing as an opener. He also played for Ireland in the traditional match against Scotland in 1912, 1913 and 1914.

After graduating from Dublin in 1920, Quinlan returned to Western Australia, where he entered into a partnership with J. R. Maxwell in the legal firm of J. and R. Maxwell. He played WACA District cricket for the East Perth Cricket Club, and represented Western Australia on tours to the Eastern states in three seasons. He captained the side in one match against South Australia in March 1927. He carried his bat in the first innings, scoring 40 runs out of the side's innings of 131, to become the first Western Australian cricketer to do so. In addition to his cricketing activities, Quinlan was a member of the Western Australian Turf Club, and owned several racehorses.

In 1925, Quinlan married Ella Byrne, the daughter of Louis Byrne, who had previously served as the Dublin coroner, with whom he had one daughter. Quinlan died at his home on Mounts Bay Road in Perth on 15 August 1935, after a long illness which had prevented him from working for four years. He had spent time in several European countries before his death in an attempt to find good health. He was buried at Karrakatta Cemetery.
