= James Mitchell (Australian politician) =

Western Australian politician and Governor

Sir James Mitchell GCMG
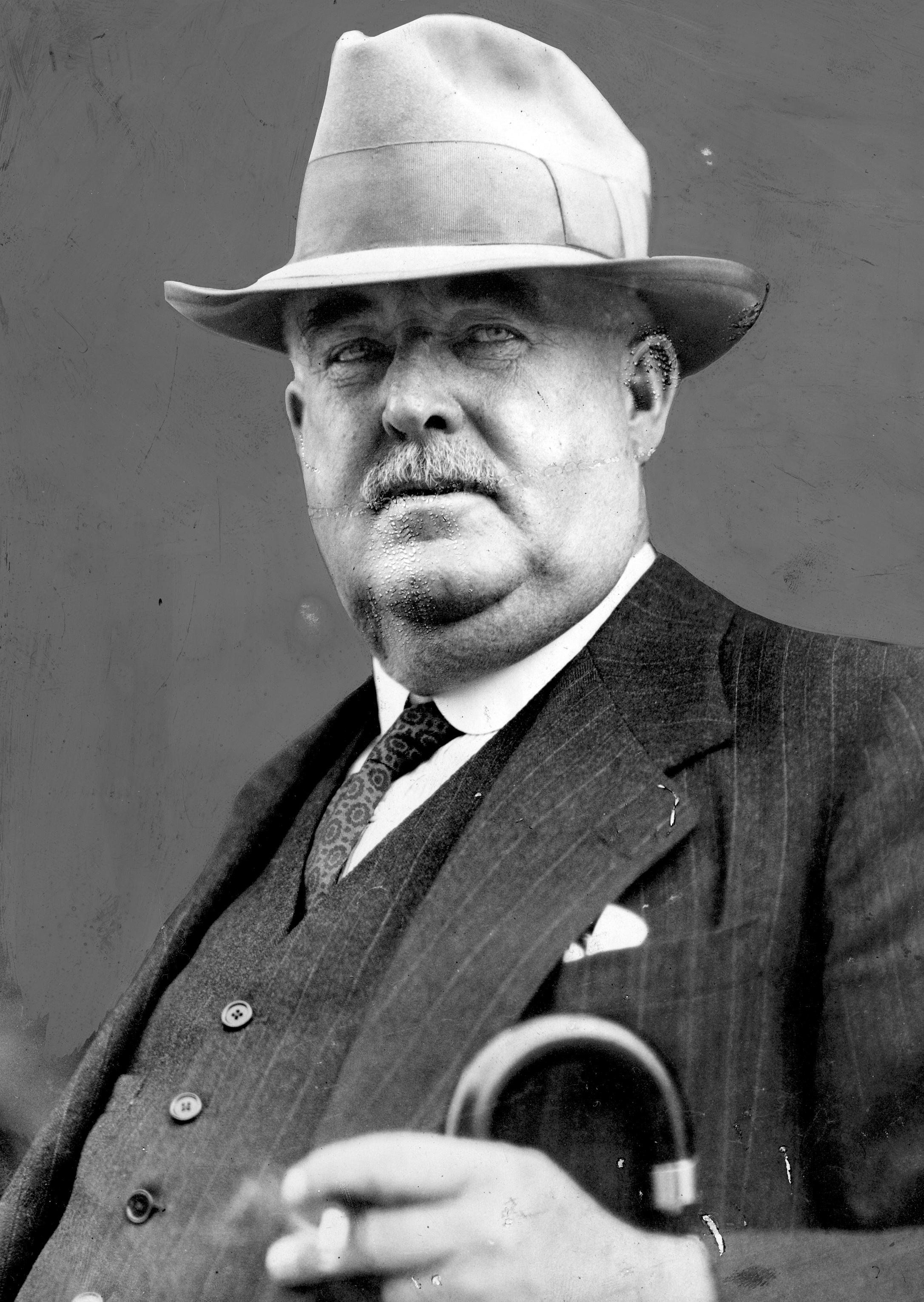

20th Governor of Western Australia
- In office 5 October 1948 – 30 June 1951; Acting governor: 11 July 1933 – 5 October 1948
- Monarch: George VI
- Premier: Sir Ross McLarty
- Preceded by: Sir William Campion
- Succeeded by: Sir Charles Gairdner

13th Premier of Western Australia
- In office 17 May 1919 – 16 April 1924
- Monarch: George V
- Governor: Sir William Ellison-Macartney; Sir Francis Newdegate
- Preceded by: Sir Hal Colebatch
- Succeeded by: Philip Collier
- In office 24 April 1930 – 24 April 1933
- Monarch: George V
- Governor: Sir William Campion; None
- Preceded by: Philip Collier
- Succeeded by: Philip Collier
- Constituency: Northam

Personal details
- Born: 27 April 1866 Dardanup, Western Australia, Australia
- Died: 26 July 1951 (aged 85) Glen Mervyn, Western Australia, Australia
- Party: Nationalist
- Spouse: Clara Robinson Spencer (m.1888–1949; her death)

Sir James Mitchell, GCMG (27 April 1866 – 26 July 1951) was an Australian politician. He served as premier of Western Australia from 1919 to 1924 and from 1930 to 1933, as leader of the Nationalist Party. He then held viceregal office from 1933 to 1951, as acting governor from 1933 to 1948 and governor of Western Australia from 1948 until his death in 1951.

Mitchell was born to a farming family in Dardanup, Western Australia. He became manager of the Western Australian Bank's Northam branch. He was first elected to the Parliament of Western Australia in 1905 and held the seat of Northam for nearly three decades. Mitchell rose quickly to ministerial office where he was a keen advocate of agricultural development. He favoured government support of primary industry and sought to use assisted migration and soldier settlement to supply the necessary labour.

Mitchell first became premier in 1919 after a period of instability in state politics, governing in coalition with the Country Party despite earlier conflict. His first term saw minor social reforms and development initiatives, but was primarily known for the Group Settlement Scheme which established the South West dairy industry. Mitchell won the 1921 state election but was defeated in 1924. He returned as premier in 1930 at the height of the Great Depression, but suffered a landslide defeat three years later and lost his own seat. He notably authorised a secession referendum in 1933.

After losing office, Mitchell was appointed lieutenant-governor by his successor Philip Collier. The office of governor was left vacant during the Great Depression as a cost-saving measure, with Mitchell serving as acting governor until being formally commissioned in the role in 1948. He died in office in 1951.

== Early life ==
Mitchell was born on 27 April 1866 in Dardanup, Western Australia. He was the oldest of thirteen children born to Caroline (née Morgan) and William Bedford Mitchell; his father was a farm manager and grazier.

Mitchell was educated in Bunbury and joined the Western Australian Bank in 1885. He was initially posted to Geraldton before becoming manager of the bank's Northam branch in 1890. Both he and the bank prospered during the Western Australian gold rushes, with Northam serving as a key staging point on the Eastern Goldfields Railway. Mitchell's success allowed him to take up farming and he remained keenly interested in agricultural development throughout his political career. He was appointed as a justice of the peace in 1897.

== Early political career ==
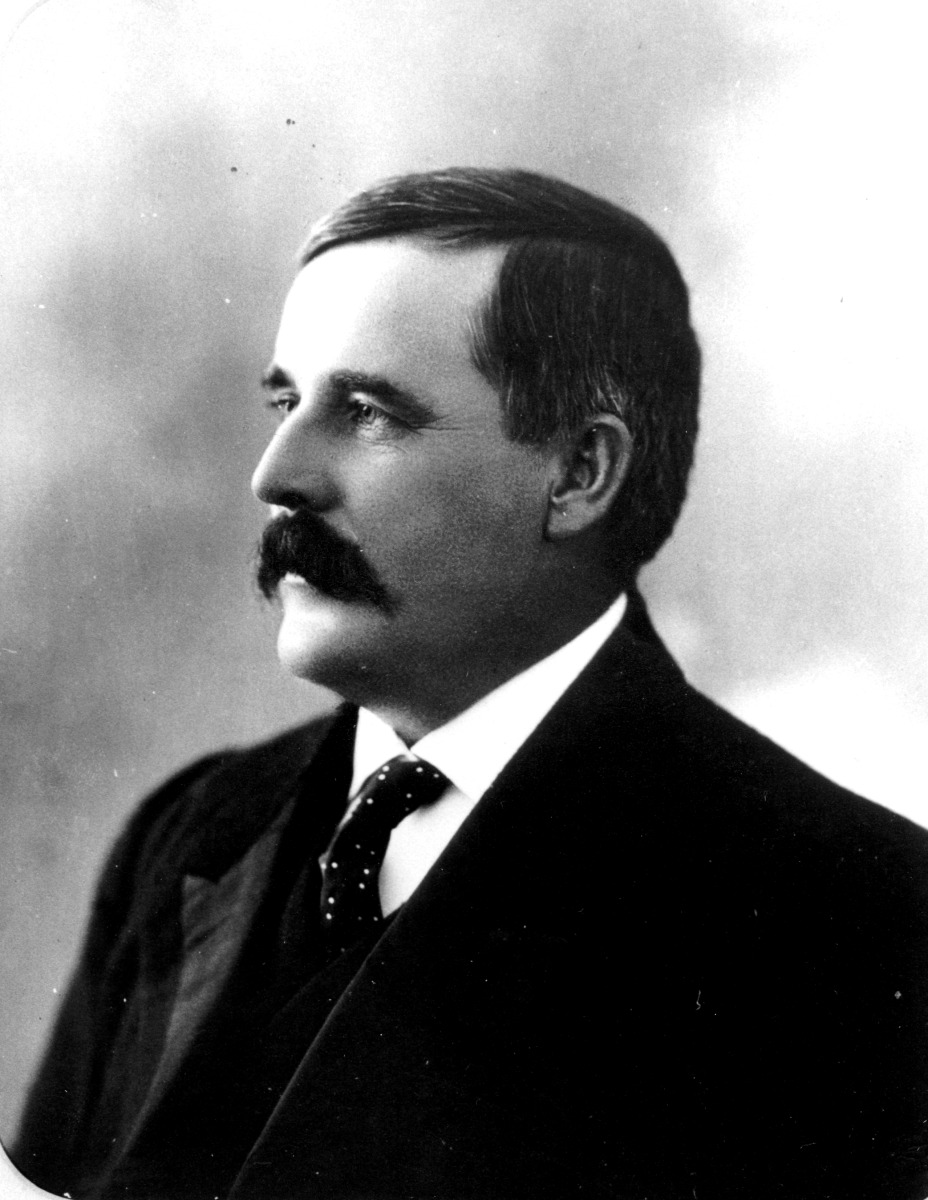
Mitchell in 1909

Mitchell was elected to the Western Australian Legislative Assembly at the 1905 Western Australian state election, winning the seat of Northam. In parliament he "earnestly advocated agricultural settlement and deplored Western Australia's dependence on imported produce, seeking to place families on the land, particularly as the goldfields declined and miners looked elsewhere". He was made a minister without portfolio in Newton Moore's government in 1906 and in 1909 was promoted to Minister for Agriculture and Lands. He added the Industries portfolio in 1910 when Frank Wilson replaced Moore as premier.

At the 1911 state election, Wilson's government was defeated by the Australian Labor Party (ALP) under John Scaddan. Mitchell as agriculture minister had presided over an expansion of the area of land under cultivation, with government support initiatives and the introduction of superphosphate pushing out the eastern boundaries of the Wheatbelt into the Yilgarn. However, unusually low rainfall in the early 1910s led to the failure of many farms. Mitchell "was blamed for his bland optimism in allegedly throwing new settlers into the bush with just an axe". He was targeted by the newly formed Farmers' and Settlers' Association, which evolved into the Country Party and won eight seats at the 1914 state election. Wilson returned as premier in 1916 in an alliance with the Country Party, which refused to allow Mitchell to return as agriculture minister. He was reappointed to the industries portfolio and also made Minister for Railways and Water Supply.

== Premier (1919–1924) ==
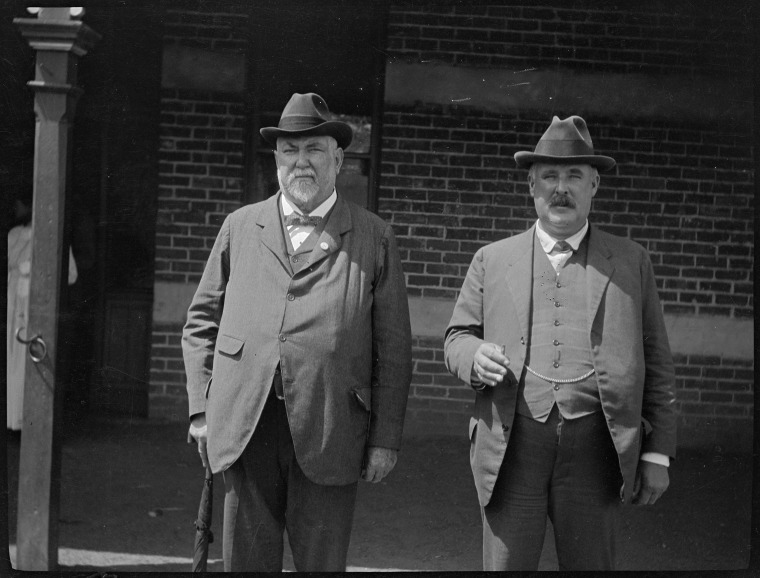
Mitchell in 1917 with John Forrest

On 17 May 1919, Premier Hal Colebatch resigned and Mitchell succeeded to the position. Mitchell won the 1921 election and remained premier until 1924. During this period he garnered much publicity for his strong support for the soldier settlement scheme in the south-west of Western Australia. As a result of his enthusiastic promotion of this scheme (which ultimately proved very costly in terms of money and resources) he was dubbed "Moo-Cow" Mitchell by the local press. Nonetheless, the establishment of a dairy industry in Western Australia can be largely credited to him. He also proved adept at dealing with the divisions between the Nationalist Party and the Country Party.

Mitchell took steps to develop the North-West, including the appoint of a resident commissioner to encourage cotton-growing and tropic agriculture. Together with his senior ministers Hal Colebatch, John Scaddan, and William George, Mitchell pursued interventionist economic policies, and thereby "antagonized conservative businessmen by their pragmatic willingness to maintain state-owned industries and state intervention in price-fixing and other industrial activities".

In his first term as premier, Mitchell's attorney-general Thomas Draper introduced legislation to allow women to stand for parliament and to liberalise the state's divorce laws. Draper was subsequently defeated by Edith Cowan at the 1921 state election, who became the first Australian woman elected to parliament. In 1922, Mitchell supported Cowan's successful private member's bill to allow mothers to inherit an equal share from their children who died intestate. He also supported her anti-sex discrimination bill to allow women to be admitted to the legal profession, although he opposed a clause eliminating the marriage bar.

Beginning with the 1919–20 summer, Perth faced a severe water shortage owing to a failure to expand the water supply in line with rapid growth in suburban areas. Mitchell's government introduced water restrictions in January 1920 and again in December 1920, including bans on sprinklers and street watering (widely used for dust suppression). In March 1923, Mitchell announced the Hills Water Supply Scheme, which provided for the creation of new reservoirs in the Perth Hills – including Canning Dam, Churchman Brook Dam, and Wungong Dam – but was estimated to take six years to complete. In the summer of 1923–24, elevated areas of Perth again experienced severe water shortages and had to rely on water carting. Mitchell and his government, who primarily represented rural electorates, were seen as unsympathetic and the crisis contributed to the government's defeat at the 1924 election.

== Premier (1930–1933) ==
Mitchell's election to a second term in office at the 1930 election coincided with the onset of the Great Depression. Facing substantial unemployment, his government provided sustenance work via irrigation schemes (notably the diversion of the Harvey River) and other public works, and also introduced an entertainment tax and the State Lotteries Commission to bring in additional revenue.

In November 1930, Mitchell declared his personal support for the secession of Western Australia. The movement for secession, led by the Dominion League of Western Australia, had accelerated following the Great Depression in response to perceived inaction by the federal government, with Mitchell describing himself as a "federalist who could not pay the price". In November 1931, his government introduced a bill for a secession referendum, which was ultimately passed as the Secession Referendum Act 1932. The referendum was held at the same time as the 1933 election and saw Western Australia vote to secede by nearly two-thirds, although it was ultimately unsuccessful.

Mitchell's government was defeated at the 1933 elections, in addition to which he became the first Western Australian premier to lose both a state election and his parliamentary seat (of Northam).

== Governor ==
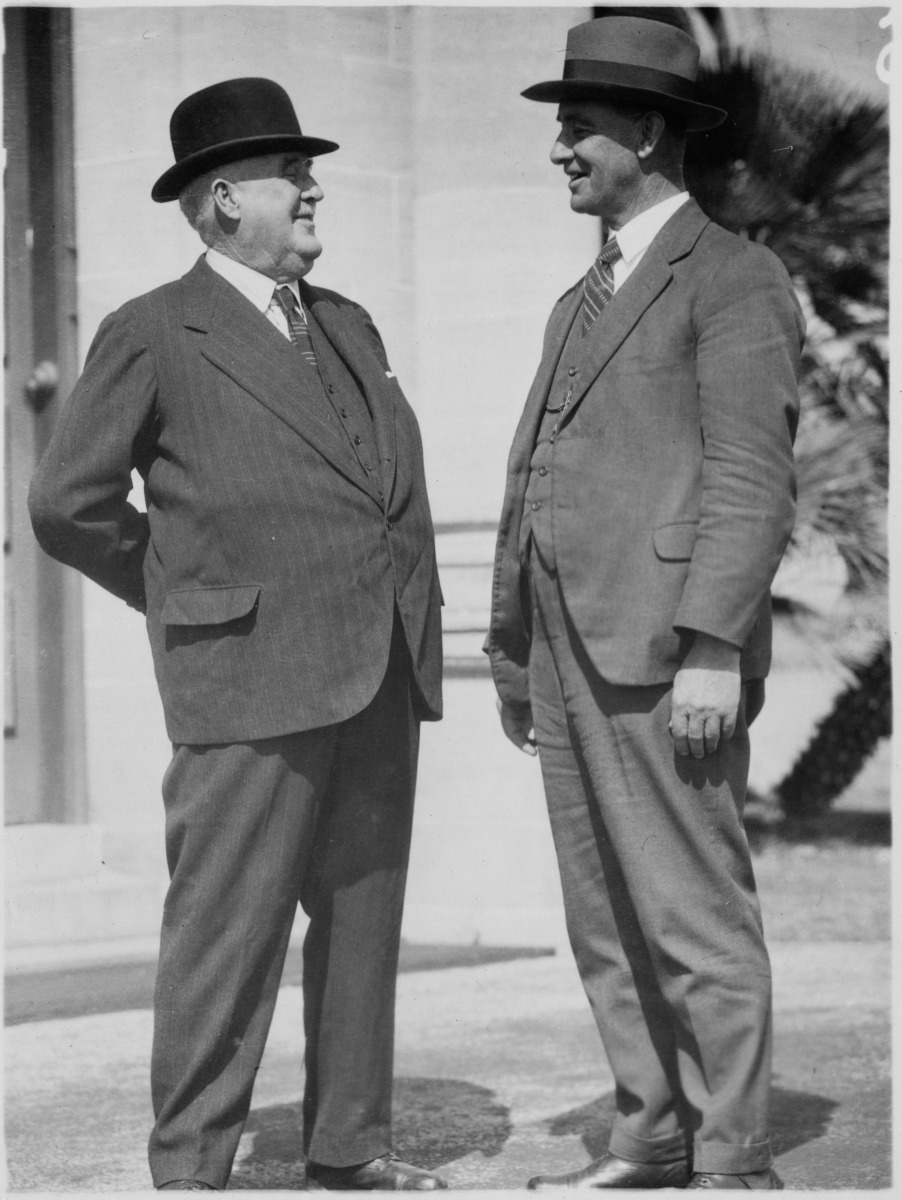
Mitchell c. 1944 with Country Party politician Charles Latham

As a result of financial difficulties during the Great Depression, Tasmania had appointed a lieutenant governor in the 1930s. With the approval of the major political parties, in July 1933 Mitchell was appointed Lieutenant-Governor of Western Australia. This meant that, although he resided in Government House, Perth, and was governor in all but name, he drew no salary, thus making a reduced demand on the public purse at a time when ordinary people were under severe restraint. He held the position until he was finally appointed Governor of Western Australia in 1948. Mitchell was the first Australian-born Governor of Western Australia; he remains the only person to have served as both premier and governor of the state. He retired from the post in June 1951.

== Personal life ==
In 1888, Mitchell married Clara Robinson Spencer, the daughter of Bunbury mayor William Spencer. The couple had three sons and a daughter; three of his children predeceased him and he was widowed in 1949.

== Death ==
Mitchell died on 26 July 1951, aged 85, in his personal railway carriage while stopped at the small siding at Glen Mervyn south of Collie, while on a tour of the southwest of the state. He was granted a state funeral and buried at Karrakatta Cemetery.

=== Legacy ===
The Mitchell Freeway was named in his honour, as was Sir James Mitchell Park in South Perth and Sir James Mitchell National Park. The botanist Charles Gardner named the rapier featherflower Verticordia mitchelliana in his honour.

Political offices
Preceded by Sir Hal Colebatch	Premier of Western Australia; 1919–1924	Succeeded by Philip Collier
Preceded by Philip Collier	Premier of Western Australia; 1930–1933	Succeeded by Philip Collier
Government offices
Vacant Title last held by Sir William Campion	Governor of Western Australia; 1948–1951	Succeeded by Sir Charles Gairdner
