= Eben Allen =

Australian politician (1868–1931)

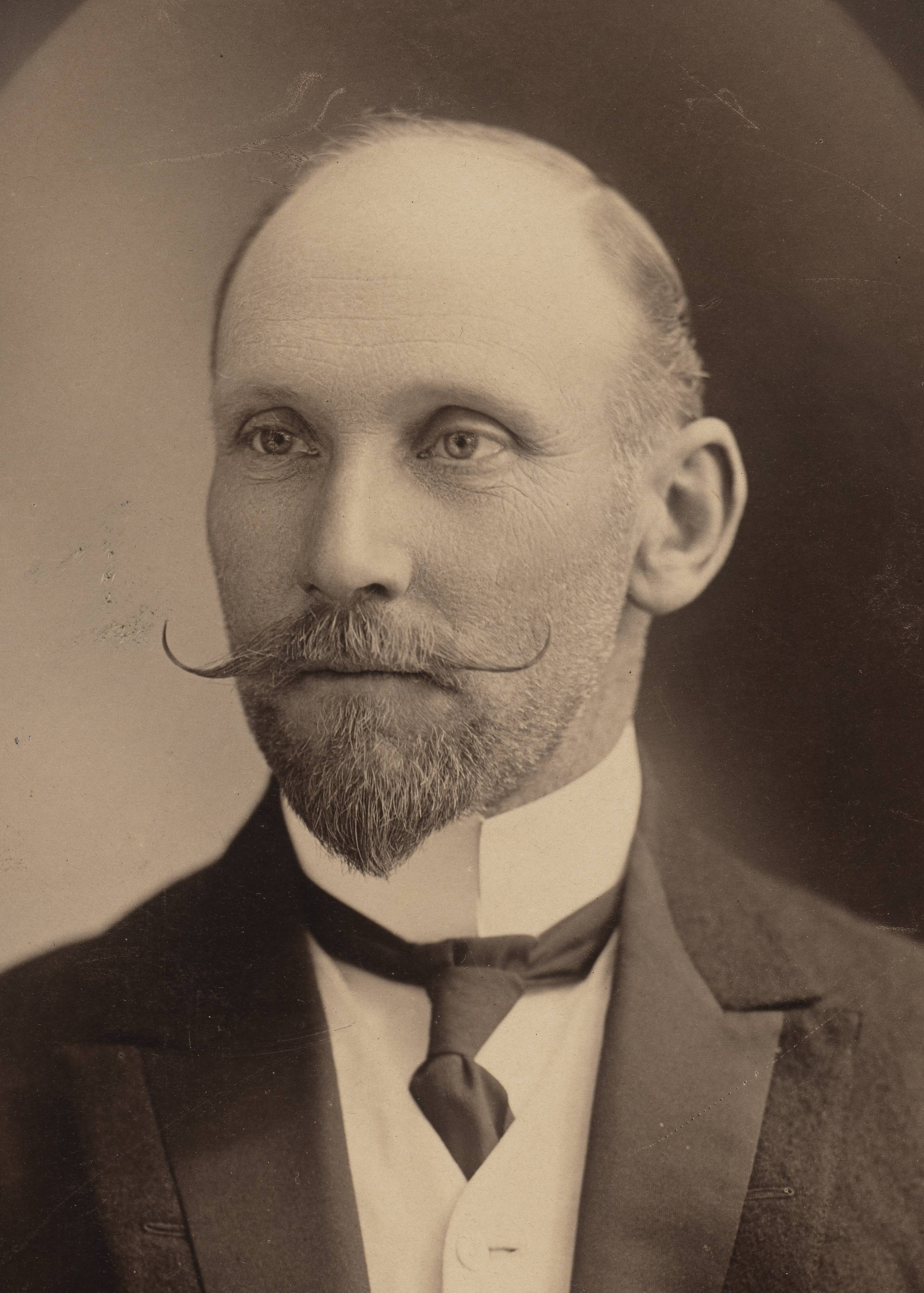
- Allen c. 1908

Member of the Legislative Assembly of Western Australia
- In office 3 October 1911 – 29 September 1917
- Preceded by: Thomas Draper
- Succeeded by: Thomas Draper
- Constituency: West Perth

Personal details
- Born: 15 November 1868 North Adelaide, South Australia, Australia
- Died: 20 May 1931 (aged 62) Perth, Western Australia, Australia
- Party: Liberal (to 1917); Nationalist (after 1917)

Ebenezer "Eben" Allen (15 November 1868 – 20 May 1931) was an Australian businessman and politician who was a member of the Legislative Assembly of Western Australia from 1911 to 1917, representing the seat of West Perth.

Allen was born in Adelaide, South Australia, to Mary Selina (née Cant) and Joseph Allen. He attended Glenelg Grammar School (run by F. I. Caterer), and after leaving school worked for various Adelaide firms. Allen married Effie Marian Conigrave in 1895 (with whom he later had two children), and in 1899 moved to Western Australia to work for her father, J. Fairfax Conigrave. He eventually went into business on his own, as an auctioneer, real estate agent, and shipping agent. He became secretary of the Perth Chamber of Commerce, and was also a director of a local building society. Allen served on the Perth City Council from 1904 to 1912 and again from 1915 to 1918. He first ran for parliament at the 1908 Legislative Council elections, but lost to Arthur Jenkins in Metropolitan Province.

At the 1911 state election, Allen was elected to parliament running for the newly formed Liberal Party. He replaced the retiring member in West Perth, Thomas Draper. Allen was re-elected at the 1914 election, but at the 1917 election was opposed by Draper, who had decided he wished to resume his parliamentary career. Both he and Draper stood for the Nationalist Party, which had been created earlier in the year, but Draper was more popular, winning back his former seat with 53.3 percent of the first-preference vote. Allen recontested West Perth at the 1921 election, but polled only the third-highest number of votes. Draper lost his seat regardless, with the winning candidate, Edith Cowan, becoming the first female member of parliament in Australia. Allen died in Perth in May 1931, aged 62. He killed himself with a gunshot to the head on the Perth Esplanade, having had business troubles and been in poor physical health.

Parliament of Western Australia
| Preceded by Thomas Draper | Member for West Perth; 1911–1917 | Succeeded by Thomas Draper |
