= Patrick Quinlan (author) =

American author, political activist, fundraiser and political candidate

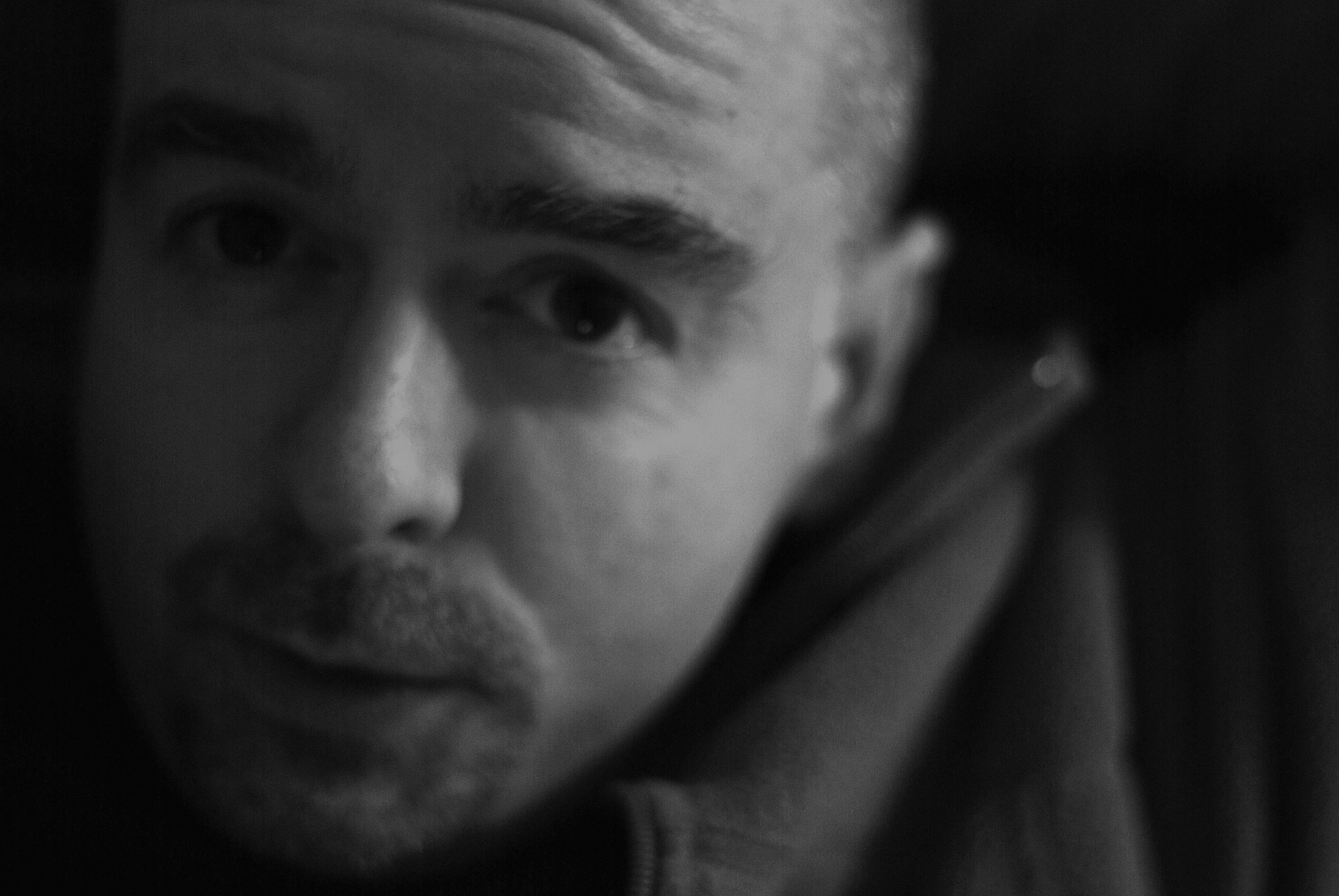
Patrick Quinlan

Patrick Quinlan is an American author, political activist, fundraiser, and briefly, a Green Independent candidate for Governor of Maine in the 2010 election. In the fall of 2009, he informed the Maine Ethics Commission that he was no longer seeking election.

== Biography ==
Quinlan was born in the Bronx and raised both there and in Yonkers, New York. He attended public elementary and middle schools, and Regis High School, a tuition-free Jesuit high school in Manhattan. As a teenager, he held numerous jobs, including working for years as a caddie. His father was an alcoholic, which had a profound effect on Quinlan's development as a child and young man.

Quinlan began his career writing grant proposals and press releases at Greyston Bakery and Greyston Foundation, where he worked for Bernie Glassman, helping raise millions of dollars to house homeless families and homeless people with AIDS. Later, Quinlan worked in public relations for the National Science Foundation.

Quinlan's crime thriller, Smoked, was published in the United States and Canada by St. Martin's Press in April 2006, and in the United Kingdom and many countries throughout the world by Hodder Headline in March 2006. It received worldwide critical acclaim, and has been translated into Portuguese, Italian, Spanish and Dutch. Film rights were optioned in 2007, and again in 2009. His second crime thriller, The Takedown (also published as The Falling Man), appeared in May and June 2007, from both St. Martin's and Headline. His third crime thriller, The Drop-Off appeared in July 2008, and his fourth, The Hit, appeared in June 2009. Quinlan has written numerous books under pen names and as a ghost author.

Quinlan's 2014 thriller Sexbot predicts a dystopian future where people have sex with, fall in love with, and download their awareness into robots. Quinlan himself has indicated he believes that in the near future, people (men especially) will easily fall in love with realistic sex robots, in a similar but deeper way than they fall in love with other inanimate objects, like cars and electronic gadgets. Much of this will have to do with the release of endorphins during sexual activity, but also with the ability of artificial intelligence to seem compassionate or supportive through simple techniques like rephrasing a person's statements back to them.

Quinlan is the co-author, with Blade Runner film star Rutger Hauer, of Hauer's memoir, All Those Moments, released by HarperCollins in May 2007, and which was a Los Angeles Times bestseller. He is also the co-author with Elena Nikitina of the 2017 memoir Girl, Taken, Nikitina's story of being abducted and surviving the First Chechen War. Girl, Taken is available in English and Russian. After the book came out, the BBC World Service covered the story on their Outlook (radio programme) program, which took the story global.

In 2016, Quinlan contributed a chapter, The Rise of the Portland Greens, to the political science book, Empowering Progressive Third Parties in the United States. The chapter recounts Quinlan's experiences as an early member of the Green Party affiliate in Portland, Maine, that achieved unexpected electoral successes from the early- to the mid-2000s, and launched the careers of progressive politicians John Eder and Ben Chipman, among numerous others.

Quinlan has been featured or favorably reviewed in many publications, including The Los Angeles Times, The Boston Globe, The Times of London, The Observer, The Guardian, The New York Times, and Entertainment Weekly. His writing has frequently been compared to that of Elmore Leonard, James Ellroy, and the movies of Quentin Tarantino.

Quinlan is known to be an avid traveler, and has visited dozens of countries around the world. His travel writing has appeared in Transitions Abroad, Travel Smart, International Living, and Maine Ahead, among others.

== Politics ==
In 2002, Quinlan served as campaign manager for John Eder, who as a result of the election became the second Green Party member elected to a state legislature in the United States. Quinlan also served as a consultant to Eder's 2004 campaign, and as Eder's legislative aide at the Maine State House during 2004 and 2005. In 2009, Quinlan established an exploratory committee and began raising funds for a run for governor of Maine. Later, he withdrew, citing his recent divorce and need for personal time. In 2010, he worked with Ben Chipman on his successful run for State Representative. In 2016, he served as campaign manager during Chipman's successful primary race for the Maine State Senate.

== Selected works ==
- Quinlan, Patrick (2005). Meil, Ari (ed.). The Way Life Should Be: stories by contemporary Maine writers. Warren. OCLC 62711262.
- Quinlan, Patrick (2006). Smoked. St. Martin's Press, Headline Books. OCLC 61240767.
- Quinlan, Patrick (2007). The Takedown. St. Martin's Press, Headline Books. OCLC 122526859.
- Hauer, Rutger; Quinlan, Patrick (2007). All Those Moments: stories of heroes, villains, replicants, and Blade Runners. Harper Entertainment. OCLC 80461426.
- Quinlan, Patrick (2008). The Drop Off. Headline Books. OCLC 271166567.
- Quinlan, Patrick (2009). The Hit. Headline Books. OCLC 315077949.
- Quinlan, Patrick (2014). Sexbot. Strawberry Books. OCLC 895568118.
- Quinlan, Patrick (2016). Martin, Jonathan (ed.). Empowering Progressive Third Parties in the United States. Routledge.
- Whitney, Brian (2017). Subversive: Interviews with Radicals. Quinlan, Patrick (interview). Headpress. ISBN 9781909394544.
- Nikitina, Elena; Quinlan, Patrick (2017). Girl, Taken: a true story of abduction, captivity and survival. Iliad Books.
