= Daniel Connor =

Australian politician

Daniel Connor (1831 – 12 January 1898) was an Irish convict transported to colonial Western Australia, who would go on to become one of the wealthiest, and most successful men in the region.

Daniel Connor was born in County Kerry, Ireland in 1831. Nothing is known of his early life, but on 20 June 1850, he was sentenced to seven years' transportation for sheep stealing. He arrived in Western Australia on Phoebe Dunbar on 30 August 1853. During his time as a convict he went by the surname Connors "to confuse researchers of his history in later years". Connor received his ticket of leave on 11 August 1854 and his conditional pardon on 17 November 1855. In 1859, he married Catherine Conway (1835–1916).

Connor worked as a hawker until 1861, then bought land in Newcastle (now Toodyay), upon which he built a small store. He later purchased a number of other town lots and built upon a number of them. In 1870, he had a steam mill built, and over the next decade gained control over a number of large rural estates by lending money to the owners. He purchased the Freemason's Hotel in 1873.

Connor became active in public affairs; he was a member (and chairman in 1880) of the Toodyay Road Board from 1871 until his death in 1898. He was also a member of the Newcastle Municipal Council and served on the Toodyay Education Board.

During the 1880s, Connor sold many of his Newcastle properties and invested in land at Perth and Fremantle. In 1883, he bought the Shamrock Hotel. Later that year, his daughter Teresa married Timothy Quinlan, and Connor and Quinlan went into partnership. By the 1890s, Connor was one of the largest landowners in central Perth. When he died at his home on 12 January 1898, his estate was valued at over £76,000.

Connor's eldest son, Michael, who took the surname O'Connor, presumably to obscure his convict parentage, became a Member of the Western Australian Legislative Assembly.

== Family ==
Daniel Connor and his wife Catherine, née Conway, had three sons – the eldest, Michael, became a politician – and four daughters, the eldest of whom, Teresa, married the businessman and politician Timothy Quinlan.

== General references ==
- Stevenson, Robert (1983). "Daniel Connor". In Erickson, Rica (ed.). The Brand on his Coat: Biographies of some Western Australian Convicts. Nedlands: UWA Publishing. p. 157–223, 239–245. ISBN 0-85564-223-8. LCCN 84145691. OCLC 12051617. OL 2914148M. Wikidata Q133820754.
