= Timothy Quinlan =

Australian politician

The Honourable Timothy Quinlan CMG KSS
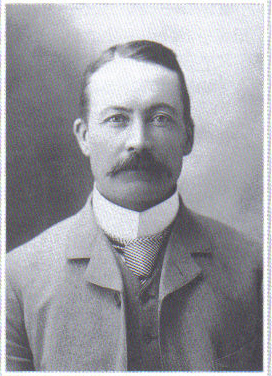

4th Speaker of the Western Australian Legislative Assembly
- In office 23 November 1905 – 8 October 1911
- Premier: Newton Moore
- Preceded by: Mathieson Jacoby
- Succeeded by: Frank Troy

Minister for Works of Western Australia
- In office 21 November 1901 – 23 December 1901
- Premier: Alf Morgans
- Preceded by: Walter Kingsmill
- Succeeded by: Hector Rason

Member of the Western Australian Parliament for West Perth
- In office 10 December 1890 – 1894
- Preceded by: Constituency created
- Succeeded by: Barrington Wood

Member of the Western Australian Parliament for Toodyay
- In office 1897–1911
- Preceded by: Bernard Clarkson
- Succeeded by: Alfred Piesse

Personal details
- Born: 18 February 1861 Borrisokane, County Tipperary, Ireland
- Died: 8 July 1927 Perth, Western Australia, Australia
- Party: Independent (nominally Ministerial)

Timothy Francis Quinlan CMG KSS (18 February 1861 – 8 July 1927) was an Irish-born Australian politician who represented the electorates of West Perth and Toodyay in the Western Australian Legislative Assembly between 1890 and 1894, and 1897 and 1911, respectively. Quinlan was also Speaker of the Assembly for a period of time between 1905 and 1911.

Born in Borrisokane, County Tipperary, Ireland on 18 February 1861, Timothy Quinlan emigrated to Western Australia with his parents in 1863. Orphaned in 1865, he was raised by Joseph Thomas Reilly, and educated at the Cathedral Boys School in Perth. He worked for John Monger at York from 1875, and then for Alexander McRae at Roebourne. He was also involved in the pearling industry for about two years.

In 1882, Quinlan leased the Shamrock Hotel in Perth from Daniel Connor, an expiree convict who had become one of the wealthiest men in the colony. In 1883, Quinlan married Teresa Connor (1863–1904), Daniel Connor's daughter, with whom he later had eight children. Bernard Gerald and Patrick Francis Quinlan both played first-class cricket in Ireland, while his oldest daughter, Teresa Gertrude Quinlan, married politician John Kirwan, who served in both State and Federal Parliament. Quinlan's brother-in-law, Michael O'Connor, also served a term in the Legislative Assembly, where he represented the seat of Moore.

From 1890, Quinlan became increasingly involved in public affairs. He was a member of the Perth City Council from 1890 to 1902, unsuccessfully contesting the mayoralty in 1900; and he became a Justice of the Peace in 1893. At the 1890 colonial election, he was elected to the Western Australian Legislative Assembly seat of West Perth. Quinlan became embroiled in a controversy regarding provision of state aid to private schools, which he and fellow Catholic MLAs Thomas Molloy and Alfred Canning supported. The Catholic Vicar General, Father Anselm Bourke, established the Education Defence League with their assistance. However, the issue became a major one in the 1894 election, and all three MLAs lost their seats to opponents of state aid—Quinlan was defeated by Barrington Wood.

In the election of 1897, he won the Legislative Assembly seat of Toodyay, which he would hold for nearly 14 years. From 21 November to 23 December 1901, he was Minister for Works in the short-lived Morgans ministry. He served as Chairman of Committees from 18 July to 23 November 1905, and Speaker of the Legislative Assembly from 23 November 1905 to 3 October 1911. Quinlan lost his seat in the election of 1911. In 1918, he contested a Metropolitan Province seat in the Legislative Council, but was unsuccessful.

Quinlan was a member of the Perth Hospital Board for many years, and its chairman from 1905 to 1913. He was a director of the South British Insurance Company, and of the Perth Building Society from 1901 to 1927, serving as its chairman after 1924. He was a trustee of the University Endowment Act, and a member of the Board of Management for the Deaf and Dumb, and the Institute for the Blind. He was created CMG in 1913. He died in Perth on 8 July 1927, and was buried at Karrakatta Cemetery.

== General references ==
- Black, David; Bolton, Geoffrey (2001a). Biographical Register of Members of the Parliament of Western Australia. Vol. One: 1870–1930 (Revised ed.). Parliament House: Parliament of Western Australia. ISBN 0730738140.
- Kimberly, Warren Burt, ed. (1897). History of West Australia: A Narrative of her Past together with Biographies of her Leading Men. Melbourne: F. W. Niven. OCLC 36942961. Wikidata Q5867187.
- De Garis, Brian (1 December 1981). "Self-government and the evolution of party politics". In C. T. Stannage (ed.). A New History of Western Australia. Nedlands: UWA Publishing. pp. 342–343. ISBN 0-85564-181-9. LCCN 82101009. OCLC 963830667. OL 3517729M. Wikidata Q125995168.
