= Stan Heal =

Australian rules footballer and coach

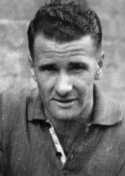

Personal information
- Full name: Stanley Heal
- Nickname: Pops
- Born: 30 July 1920; West Leederville, Western Australia
- Died: 15 December 2010 (aged 90); Nedlands, Western Australia
- Height: 170 cm (5 ft 7 in)
- Weight: 70 kg (154 lb)
- Positions: Wing, rover

Playing career^{1}
Years	Club	Games (Goals)
1939–1953	West Perth	180
1941	Melbourne	8 (5)

Representative team honours
Years	Team	Games (Goals)
1946–1951	Western Australia	18

Coaching career
Years	Club	Games (W–L–D)
1947–1952	West Perth	133 (95–38–0)
- ^{1} Playing statistics correct to the end of 1953.

Career highlights
- Three premierships for West Perth; One premiership for Melbourne; Two premierships in one season: 1941; Six successive finals series as coach of West Perth

Stanley "Pops" Heal (30 July 1920 – 15 December 2010) was an Australian rules footballer who played for Melbourne in the Victorian Football League (VFL) as well as West Perth in the West Australian National Football League (WANFL) during the 1940s and early 1950s.

Heal played his best football as a wingman but was also used on occasions as a rover. The Western Australian spent just one season at Melbourne, who had acquired his services while he was temporarily stationed in Victoria. Despite playing just eight games he was a member of Melbourne's 1941 premiership team. The following week he played in another premiership, back home in Western Australia with West Perth.

He was also regular interstate representative for Western Australia, winning a Simpson Medal for his performance in a game against South Australia in 1949 and captaining his state at the 1950 Brisbane Carnival.

As coach of West Perth from 1947 to 1952 he steered his club to two premierships, in 1949 and 1951.

From 1953 to 1965 he was a Labor member of the Western Australian Legislative Assembly, representing the seat of West Perth until 1962 and Perth thereafter.

Heal was inducted into the Australian Football Hall of Fame in 2010. He died on 15 December 2010.
