= Jacksonia velveta =

Conservation status
- Declared rare (DEC)

Scientific classification
- Kingdom: Plantae
- Clade: Tracheophytes
- Clade: Angiosperms
- Clade: Eudicots
- Clade: Rosids
- Order: Fabales
- Family: Fabaceae
- Subfamily: Faboideae
- Genus: Jacksonia
- Species: J. velveta

Binomial name
- Jacksonia velveta Chappill

Species of legume

Jacksonia velveta is a species of flowering plant in the family Fabaceae and is endemic to the south-west Western Australia. It is an erect, upright, sometimes sprawling shrub with greyish-green branches, the end branches phylloclades, the leaves broadly egg-shaped and toothed but that fall off as they mature, flowers yellow-orange with red marking arranged singly at the base of the phylloclades, and woody, flattened elliptic pods.

== Description ==
Jacksonia velveta is an open, erect, sometimes sprawling shrub that typically grows up to 0.5–2 m (1 ft 8 in – 6 ft 7 in) high, 0.5–1 m (1 ft 8 in – 3 ft 3 in) wide and has many branches. The end branches are phylloclades, its leaves erect, reddish brown, broadly egg-shaped , 1.5–4 mm (0.059–0.157 in) long and 1.4–1.8 mm (0.055–0.071 in) wide but that fall off as they mature. The flowers are arranged singly at the base of the phylloclades on pedicels 3–4 mm (0.12–0.16 in) long, with egg-shaped bracteoles 1.5–2.5 mm (0.059–0.098 in) long and 1.3–1.7 mm (0.051–0.067 in) wide with toothed edges. The floral tube is 1.2–2 mm (0.047–0.079 in) long and not ribbed, and the sepals are membranous, becoming brittle and straw-coloured, with lobes 12.7–18 mm (0.50–0.71 in) long, 5–9.3 mm (0.20–0.37 in) wide and fused for 1.6–2.2 mm (0.063–0.087 in). The standard petal is yellow-orange with red markings on the inner surface, 13.7–14.6 mm (0.54–0.57 in) long and 10.7 mm (0.42 in) deep, the wings yellow-orange without markings, 9.8–10.5 mm (0.39–0.41 in) long, and the keel is pale apricot to yellowish green, 9.5–9.8 mm (0.37–0.39 in) long. The stamens have green filaments, 9–12.1 mm (0.35–0.48 in) long. Flowering occurs in November and December, and the fruit is a woody, densely hairy, flattened elliptic pod 7.5–8.5 mm (0.30–0.33 in) long and 4.8–6 mm (0.19–0.24 in) wide.

== Taxonomy ==
Jacksonia velveta was first formally described in 2007 by Jennifer Anne Chappill in Australian Systematic Botany from specimens collected east of Collie in 1997. The specific epithet (velveta) refers to the velvety hairs on the sepals.

== Distribution and habitat ==
This species of Jacksonia grows in jarra forest in sand over laterite in scattered locaions south of Muja Power Station, Dardadine, west of Woodanilling and west of Wagin in the Avon Wheatbelt and Jarrah Forest bioregions of south-western Western Australia.

== Conservation status ==
Jacksonia velveta is listed as "Threatened Flora (Declared Rare Flora — Extant)" by the Government of Western Australia Department of Biodiversity, Conservation and Attractions, meaning that it is likely to become extinct or is rare, or otherwise in need of special protection.
