= Buckingham, Western Australia =

Locality in the Shire of Collie, Western Australia

Buckingham
- other
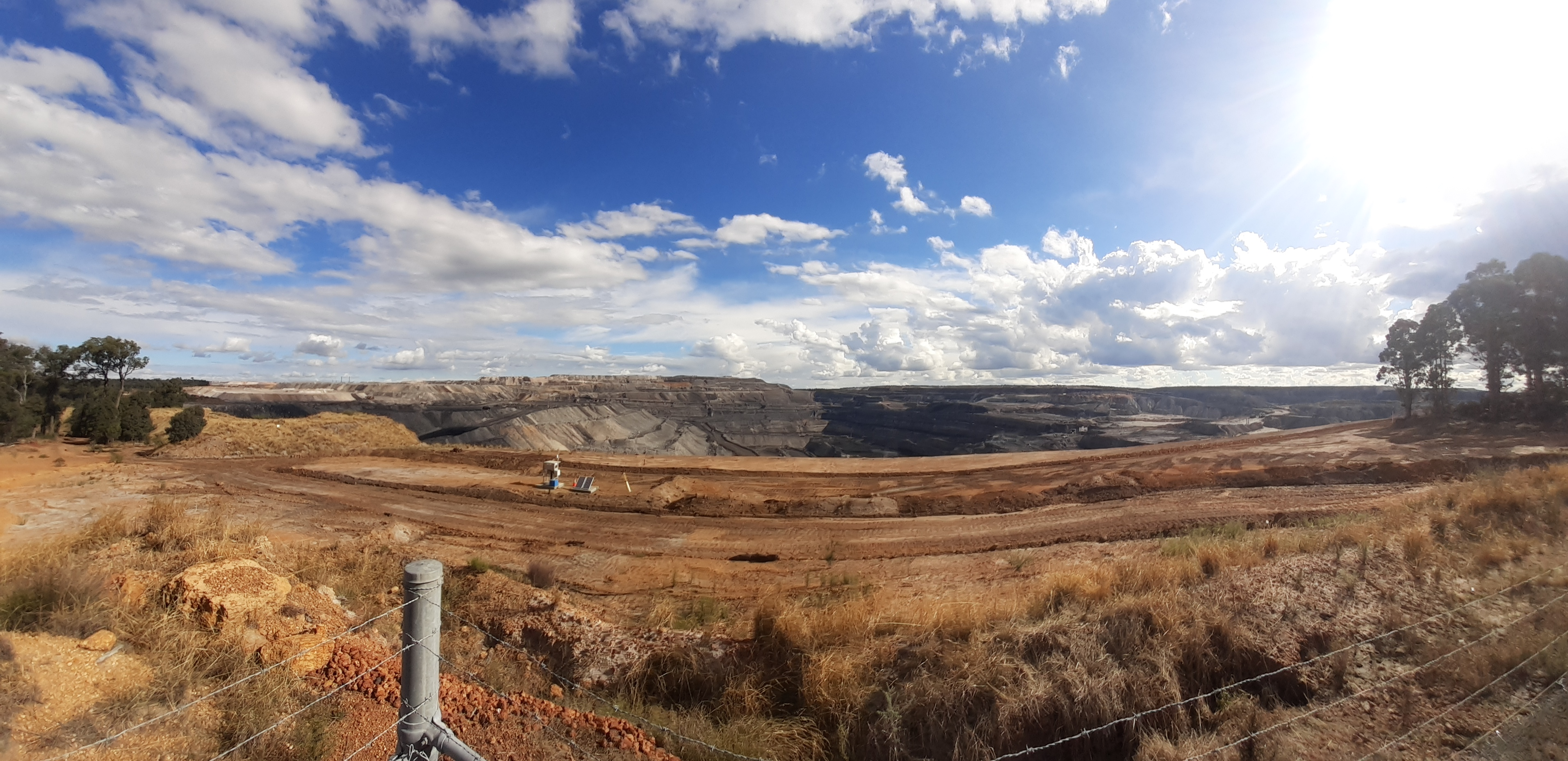
- Panorama of the Premier coal mine from the Coalfields mine lookout
- Coordinates: 33.35°S 116.34°E
- Country: Australia
- State: Western Australia
- LGA: Shire of Collie
- Location: 155 km (96 mi) from Perth; 45 km (28 mi) from Bunbury; 15 km (9.3 mi) from Collie

Government
  - State electorate: Collie-Preston
  - Federal division: O'Connor

Area
  - Total: 70.6 km^{2} (27.3 sq mi)

Population
  - Total: 27 (SAL 2021)
- Postcode: 6225
Localities around Buckingham
Palmer	Yourdamung Lake	Williams
Shotts	Buckingham	Williams
Shotts	Muja	Bowelling

Buckingham is a rural locality of the Shire of Collie in the South West region of Western Australia. At the south-western edge of the locality, south of the Coalfields Highway, it borders the large coal mines of the Collie area while the remainder of the locality is predominantly forested.

Buckingham is located on the traditional land of the Wiilman people of the Noongar nation.

The locality is home to eight heritage-listed locations, among them the former Buckingham Mill, the Muja open cut coal mine, the Buckingham Memorial Church and the Buckingham Family Residence. The former mill and the Buckingham Family Residence date back to 1911, both belonging to the brothers Ernest and James Buckingham, who settled in the area that year.
