= Yourdamung Lake, Western Australia =

Locality in the Shire of Collie, Western Australia

Yourdamung Lake
- other
- Coordinates: 33.09°S 116.33°E
- Country: Australia
- State: Western Australia
- LGA: Shire of Collie
- Location: 130 km (81 mi) from Perth; 50 km (31 mi) from Bunbury; 25 km (16 mi) from Collie

Government
  - State electorate: Collie-Preston
  - Federal division: O'Connor

Area
  - Total: 558.3 km^{2} (215.6 sq mi)

Population
  - Total: 14 (SAL 2021)
- Postcode: 6225
Localities around Yourdamung Lake
Hoffman	Upper Murray	Lower Hotham
Harris River	Yourdamung Lake	Quindanning
Palmer	Buckingham	Williams

Yourdamung Lake is a predominantly forested rural locality of the Shire of Collie in the South West region of Western Australia. Except for the Collie to Williams Road in the very south of Yourdamung Lake, no major roads lead through the locality.

Yourdamung Lake is located on the traditional land of the Wiilman people of the Noongar nation.
