= Muja, Western Australia =

Locality in the Shire of Collie, Western Australia

Muja
- Town
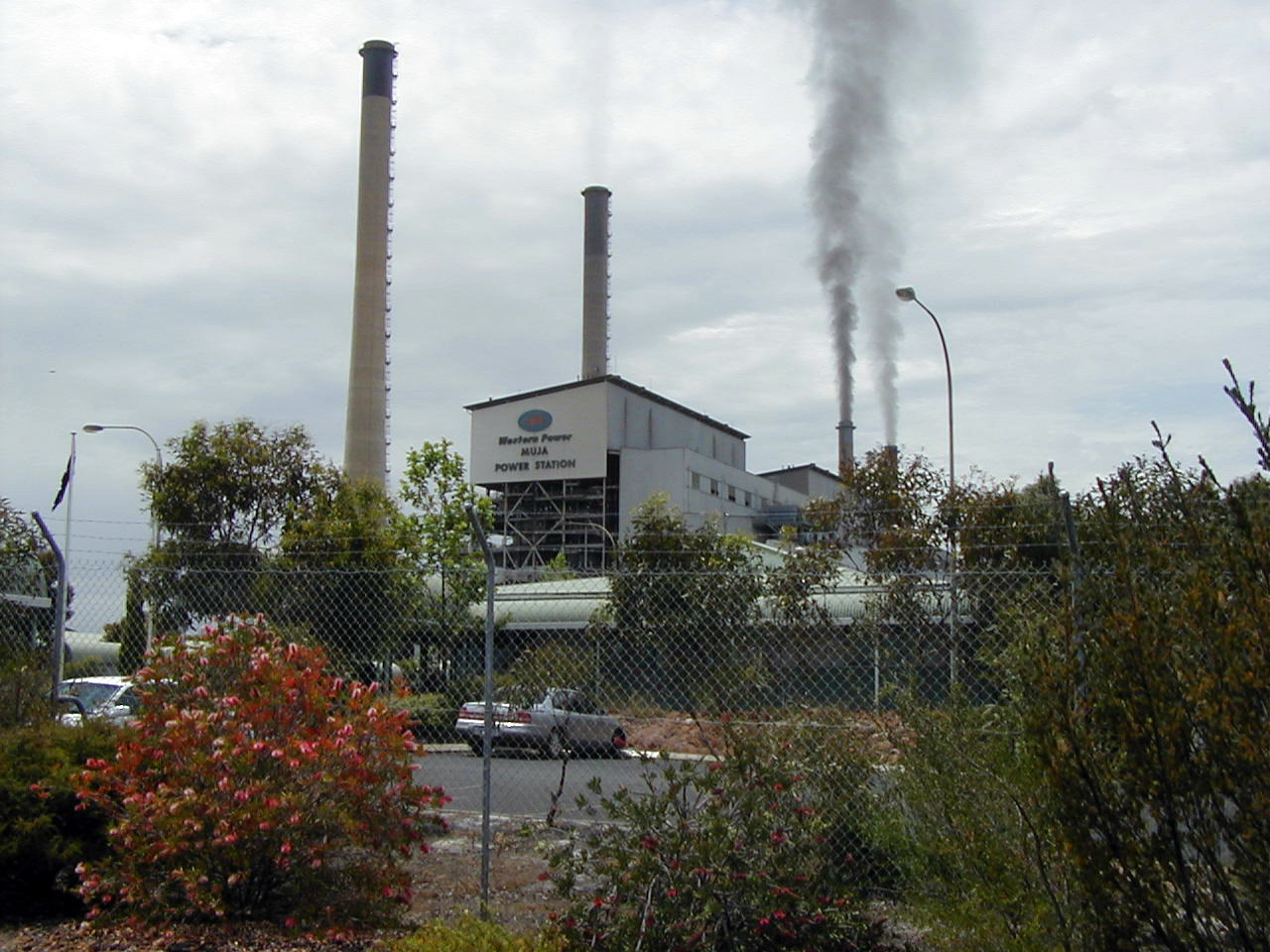
- The Muja Power Station in 2001
- Interactive map of Muja
- Coordinates: 33.42°S 116.35°E
- Country: Australia
- State: Western Australia
- LGA: Shire of Collie
- Location: 170 km (110 mi) from Perth; 65 km (40 mi) from Bunbury; 18 km (11 mi) from Collie

Government
  - State electorate: Collie-Preston
  - Federal division: O'Connor

Area
  - Total: 57.1 km^{2} (22.0 sq mi)

Population
  - Total: 18 (SAL 2016)
- Postcode: 6225
Localities around Muja
Buckingham	Buckingham	Bowelling
Shotts	Muja	Bowelling
Cardiff	Bowelling	Bowelling

Muja is a rural town and locality of the Shire of Collie in the South West region of Western Australia. The western part of the locality is dominated by coal mining and the coal-fired Muja Power Station while the eastern part is rural and forested.

The townsite of Muja, located in the north-west of the locality, was set aside for a townsite reserve at the Cabbage Trees railway siding in 1907. Cabbage Trees was located on the Collie-Darkan Railway and opened in 1907. In November 1907, the siding was renamed to Muja but townsite reserve was not formally made a townsite until 1973. The name Muja results from the Aboriginal word for the Western Australian Christmas tree, the Nuytsia floribunda, also known as the cabbage tree.

The heritage listed Buckingham Mill Precinct is located in Muja, where timber was historically milled for the Collie coalfields. Little remains now of the former mill, cottages and church.

Muja is located on the traditional land of the Kaniyang and Wiilman people of the Noongar nation.
