= 2008 Western Australian gas crisis =

Major disruption to natural gas supply in Western Australia

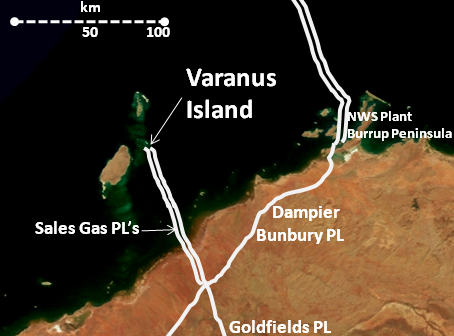
Location of facilities related to the 2008 WA gas crisis

The Western Australian gas crisis was a major disruption to natural gas supply in Western Australia, caused by the rupture of a corroded pipeline and subsequent explosion at a processing plant on Varanus Island, off the state's north west coast on 3 June 2008. The plant, operated by Apache Energy, which normally supplied a third of the state's gas, was shut down for almost two months while a detailed engineering investigation and major repairs were carried out. Gas supply from the plant partially resumed in late August. By mid-October, gas production was running at two-thirds of normal capacity, with 85% of full output restored by December 2008.

In a state heavily reliant on continuous supply of gas for industrial processing, manufacturing, residential use and electricity generation, the sudden loss of almost 35% of gas supply had immediate social impacts, and significant short and long-term economic effects. Many businesses were forced to curtail or cease operations, resulting in workers being stood down or forced to take annual leave, and the government requested that businesses and householders conserve energy usage. An emergency coordination committee of government and industry representatives rationed and redirected remaining gas supply sources. When many large gas users switched to diesel for power generation, the risk of a shortfall in transport fuel led to the federal government authorising the release of emergency fuel reserves stored at the Garden Island naval facility.

The incident raised significant public and political issues related to energy security, adequacy of existing infrastructure, contingency planning, and the role of regulatory agencies. The plant took three months to repair, although partial supplies were restored within six weeks of the explosion. A major investigation was launched by the National Offshore Petroleum Safety Authority (NOPSA), with separate investigations conducted by the plant operator and several other government agencies. NOPSA's report was published on 10 October 2008, and confirmed early suggestions that the explosion was caused by structural failure of the export pipeline due to significant corrosion. A Senate Committee inquiry was established to investigate the economic impacts and the state government's response to the crisis. The committee's report was handed down on 3 December 2008.

== Background ==
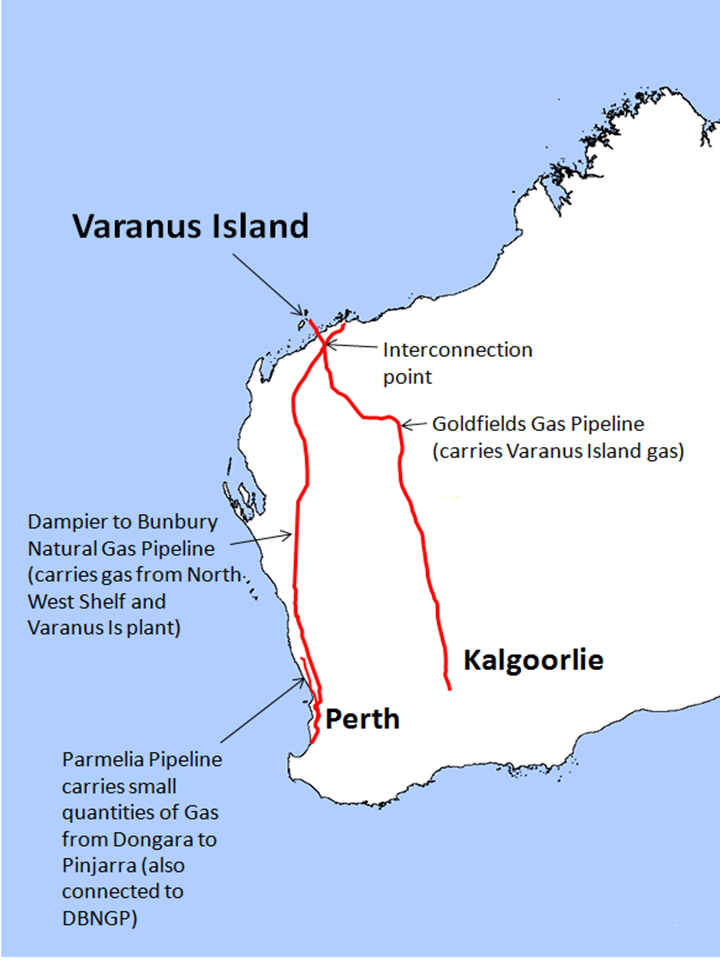
Location of Varanus Island and related gas infrastructure

Since 1996, Varanus Island, 70 kilometres (43 mi) from the Western Australian coast, has operated as a hub for oil, condensate and gas gathering infrastructure belonging to several petroleum joint ventures, including Harriet JV and John Brookes JV. The island's facilities include large tanks where condensate is stored prior to being offloaded onto tankers, and five gas plants. Condensate, water and other impurities are removed from the gas arriving from the offshore platforms connected to the island. Most of the carbon dioxide is removed so the gas can meet the specifications of the onshore pipelines and end users. Gas from the plant is sent via two subsea pipelines to the mainland, where the pipelines connect to the Goldfields Gas Pipeline and the Dampier to Bunbury Natural Gas Pipeline. Before the incident, the plant produced 365 terajoules of gas per day for the state market.

The gas plant is licensed under the WA Petroleum Pipelines Act 1969. Safety and health regulation under this Act is the responsibility of the Department of Mines and Petroleum (DMP), which engaged National Offshore Petroleum Safety Authority (NOPSA) to provide inspections and reporting.

== Incident ==
At 13:40 on 3 June 2008, an export gas pipeline ruptured near the gas plant, causing a fire in a large section of the plant. No one was injured and all employees on the island were moved to a safety point within 20 minutes of the explosion. One hundred and fifty-three staff were evacuated later that day, with 13 staff staying on the island to monitor the situation. Chief Executive Officer G. Steven Farris said, "Our priorities are the safety of our personnel, securing the facilities, assuring that the environmental impact is limited to the island and resuming throughput of oil and gas production...No-one was injured, all personnel are safe, and the rupture and fire appear to be contained on the island."

The explosion and resulting fire caused a full plant shutdown, reducing Western Australia's supply of energy by up to 35%. Apache's managing director, Tim Wall, said, "It's pretty easy to say there is a lot of damage here and we are looking at alternatives to try to get gas to market as soon as possible but it will be at least several months before we have partial sales." He estimated it would be at least three months until the plant was at least partially operational, when the less-damaged processing plants for John Brookes and East Spar are brought back online. The John Brookes and East Spar plants produced 150-200 terajoules of gas daily, compared to 370 terajoules when all plants, including the significantly damaged Harriet plant, were fully operational. Approximately 80-90% of the island's gas is used by industrial customers, with small amounts provided to Synergy, the state's largest electricity retailer.

== Political response ==
The explosion was investigated separately by Apache Energy, the National Offshore Petroleum Safety Authority (NOPSA) and other agencies. The WA State Opposition called for a royal commission, with Energy Spokesperson John Day saying, "It's a matter of making sure that this major disaster, which is now facing WA, does not happen again". Western Australian Premier Alan Carpenter said this was unnecessary because the National Offshore Petroleum Safety Authority was investigating and it could compromise their inquiry. Carpenter said their investigation will take 10–12 weeks to complete and its findings will be released to the public. State Opposition Leader, Troy Buswell, said that NOPSA had a conflict of interest as it helped perform safety inspections on the island, and therefore "are conducting an investigation which will in part be an investigation into themselves".

Premier Carpenter held a meeting on 8 June with key stakeholders in WA's gas industry and announced that gas would be sourced from alternative suppliers, and a coal-fired power station, which was shut down for maintenance, would be brought back online. He also asked domestic users to save energy where possible, as the saved energy could be used by industries in need.

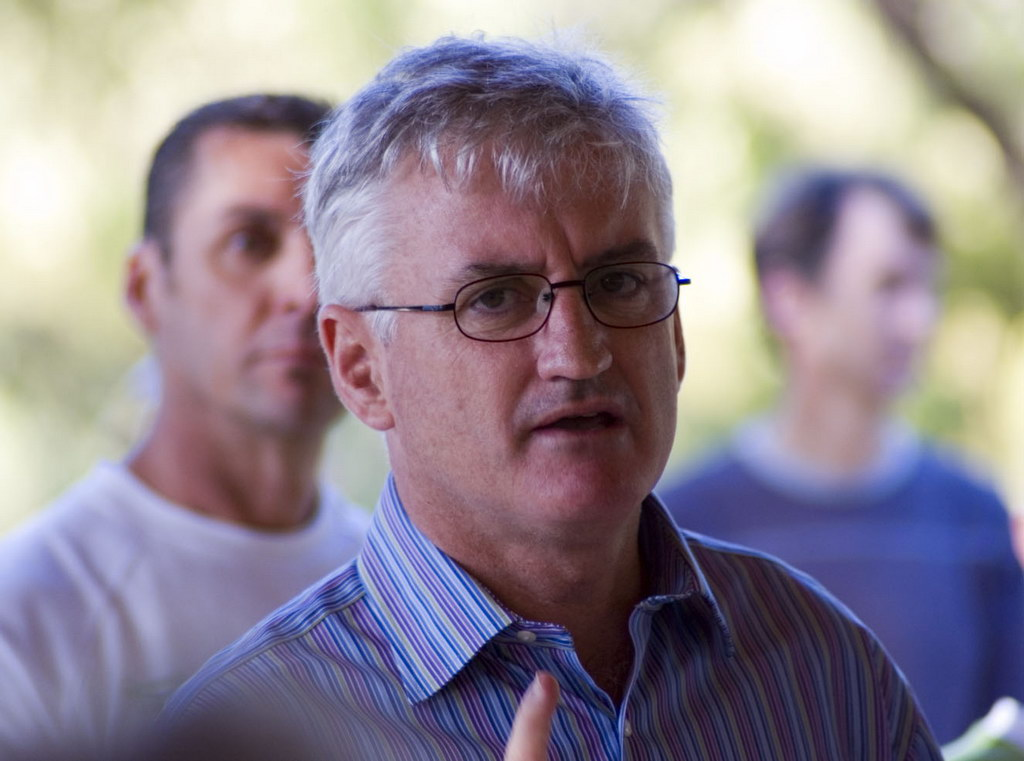
Premier Alan Carpenter

On 11 June, Carpenter warned he might need to invoke emergency powers and take control of all of WA's gas and electricity supplies, which would result in rolling stoppages, blackouts and brownouts. He also said he had discussed accessing emergency diesel supplies stored by the Department of Defence at Garden Island with Acting Prime Minister Julia Gillard. The state's Energy Minister, Fran Logan, said the decommissioned Muja AB coal-fired power station at Collie would be returned to service to supply 25 terajoules to industry. He estimated it would take up to six weeks before the plant was operational, and said, "These units are old and not as environmentally friendly as new generators. However, the state is facing a significant gas shortage and we need to look at all avenues".

Power consumption will be reduced from 22 megawatts to four megawatts a day at the State Government's water desalination plant in Kwinana, announced Carpenter on 12 June. He said this "will save around about five to six terajoules of energy a day which can be redirected to where it's needed...The decision will not jeopardise water supplies. We are able to switch the desalination plant back on to full production within a few hours ... four to five hours."

On 17 June, two weeks after the explosion, Carpenter made an unprecedented public address on television and radio.

"Gas is not only a direct fuel source for industry, we use it in our homes and it's used to generate a large proportion of our electricity. While the State Government has the power to guarantee gas supplies to essential services and households, some industries and business have been hit hard. A number of them are being forced to scale back operations and others have temporarily closed.... We need your help. By continuing to work together we can lessen the impact of the gas shortage on our state, on our businesses and our families." – Carpenter, 17 June 2008

David Black, a political analyst, said Carpenter's address shows that the situation is serious: "Probably in terms of the total amount of gas and electricity being used, the community is a relatively small player...But politically, it is so important that they share the burden and that they be aware of the fact that they should be sharing the burden." Opposition Leader Buswell called for daily publication of a gas supply allocation for businesses. After Carpenter's address, power consumption fell 2% the next morning, on the coldest day since September 2007. Carpenter said, "The saved consumption was very, very significant, enough to power the city of Geraldton".

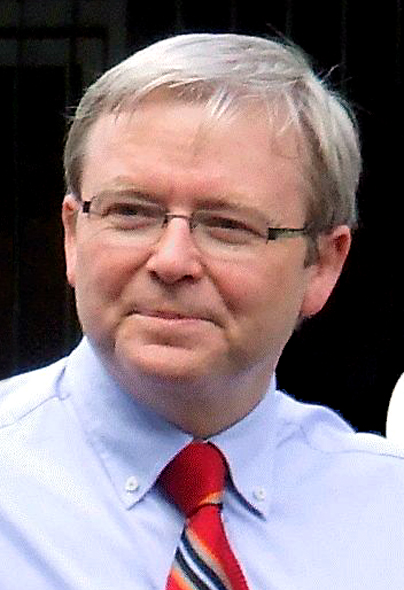
Prime Minister Kevin Rudd

On 18 June, Prime Minister Kevin Rudd told Federal Parliament that Premier Carpenter had established a Gas Supply Coordination Group, involving government agencies and industry representatives. Rudd said the Royal Australian Navy was supplying six megalitres of diesel fuel to WA, and the Federal Government would consider invoking the Liquid Fuel Emergency Act if necessary, enabling federal Minister for Resources and Energy, Martin Ferguson, to control production, transfer and stock levels of crude oil and other liquid fuel.

"This is a serious matter for Western Australia therefore it is a serious matter for all Australians... We believe that is an appropriate level of coordination between the two governments... I think people in the east have not quite caught up with the severity of the impact which this is having across the WA economy. It is huge... If there is a significant impact on WA economic activity and growth and on exports from that state, given the significance to the overall Australian economy, there will be wash through from us all on this over time." – Rudd, 18 June 2008

On 21 June, it was revealed that the state-owned electricity generator Verve Energy continued to use hundreds of terajoules of gas each week, despite having access to diesel fuel. A spokesperson said the company had not been instructed to cut back its gas usage, and there was "no intention to use very expensive diesel instead of gas, especially when supplies and deliveries of diesel are stretched and Verve Energy continues to receive its supplies of gas from the North West Shelf". Opposition Leader Troy Buswell said, "This is arrogance and hypocrisy of the highest order... They should be substituting gas for diesel, given the fact their plants can run on diesel. Gas could be re-directed to businesses which don't have choice about using gas or diesel." The State Government had also delayed approval of a new gas processing plant for Apache Energy by over six months, only allowing Apache to proceed after the gas crisis commenced and worsened.

The lack of a State Government contingency plan was criticised by Robert Amin, Curtin University's chair of Petroleum Engineering and chair of the Woodside Research Foundation, who said the Government should have stored enough gas in underground reservoirs to power the state for at least one month, to mitigate a potential crisis. Amin said gas could be stored in parts of the Perth Basin depleted of gas, like Dongara, and companies could be offered tax incentives. Federal Opposition spokesperson for trade, Ian Macfarlane, called for a national audit of all gas pipelines, and highlighted the vulnerability of the single pipeline that carries WA's gas from the North West Shelf. Macfarlane said, "At the very least this event comes as a wake-up call for the construction of a second pipeline from the North West shelf to supply gas to industry especially in the south-western part of Western Australia." Professor Dong-ke Zhang, Director of the Centre for Petroleum, Fuels and Energy at the University of Western Australia, said, "I would have thought it was quite silly for a very advanced state like WA that we are not able to cope with an incident like this by not having the ability to divert gas from an LNG plant to the domestic pipeline. At a policy level, the infrastructure needs to be longer term and the Government should encourage major players like Woodside and Chevron to invest in the infrastructure and give the incentives for the industry to come to the party because they get much bigger margins by selling LNG overseas."

== Restoration of supply ==
A statement released by Apache Energy on 13 June 2008 said the company had sourced pipe and valves needed to repair the pipeline. Apache said it was increasing the number of staff on the island conducting integrity checks, with over 140 staff expected on site the following week. On 18 June, Apache Energy said it had commenced demolition and restoration of the damaged pipeline and expected this to be finished by the end of the following week. The pipe was already in Karratha and valves and fittings from the United Kingdom were expected to arrive in early July. Gas supply from the plant partially resumed in late August. By mid-October, gas production was running at two-thirds of normal capacity, with 85% of full output restored by December 2008.

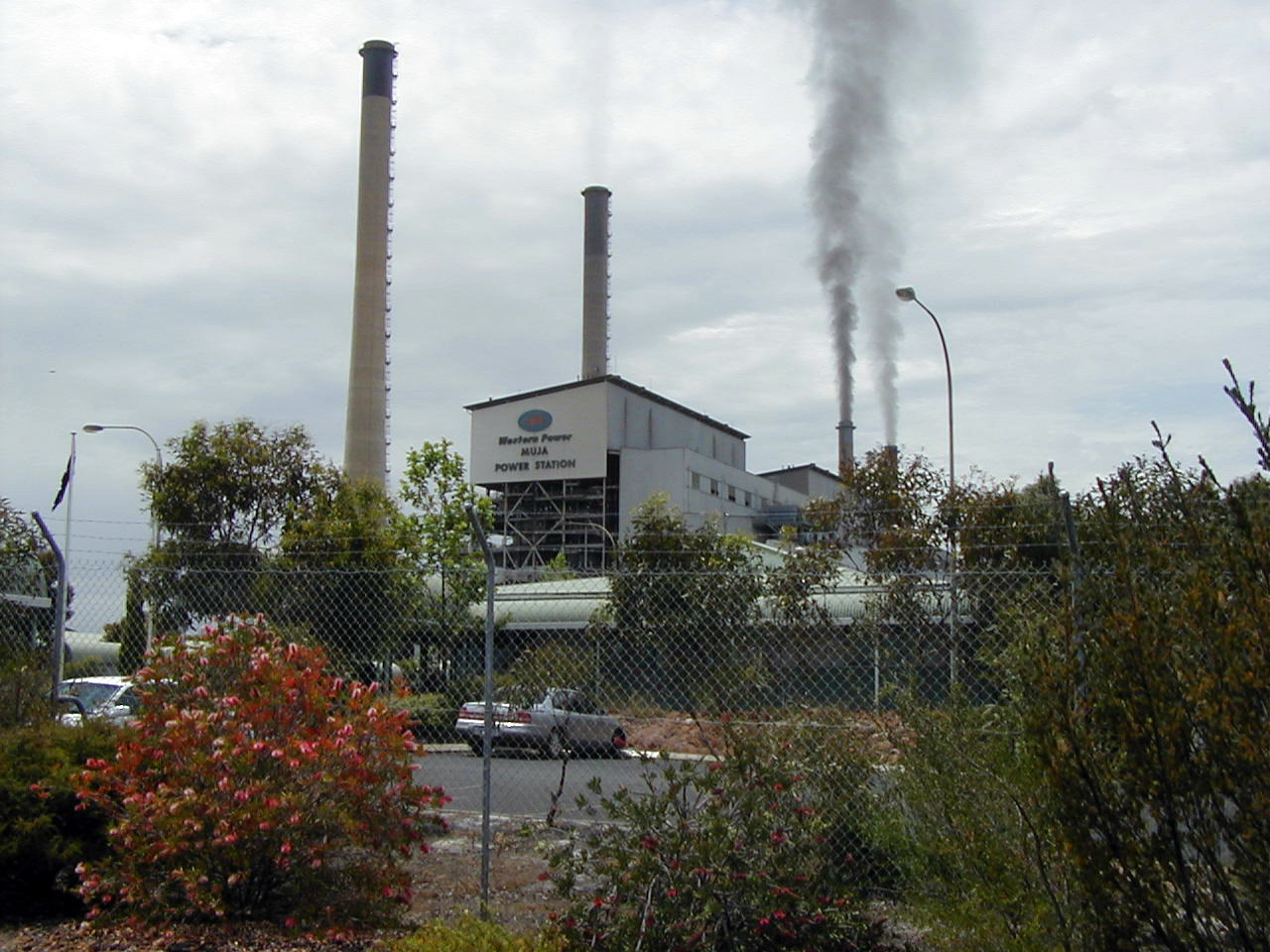
Muja Power Station

On 23 June 2008, Apache Energy released a statement that said limited production of 200 terajoules of gas from the East Spar Joint Venture would start by 15 August, with full production expected by December. Also on 23 June, the Muja power station came back online. Western Power spokesperson Ken Brown said the plant will provide "very minimal megawatts because it has been out for many months, not just for pure maintenance, it's had a complete overhaul of the machine and the control, and it's going to take quite a while to commission that, but by next week it will be producing some significant coal megawatts and that's really good." Kwinana Unit 1, a power station located at Kwinana closed for maintenance before the explosion, was reactivated on 8 July. The 110 megawatt station operated at 60% capacity for the first few days before running at full capacity. Kwinana Unit 1 is expected to free up to five terajoules of gas daily.

== Impact ==
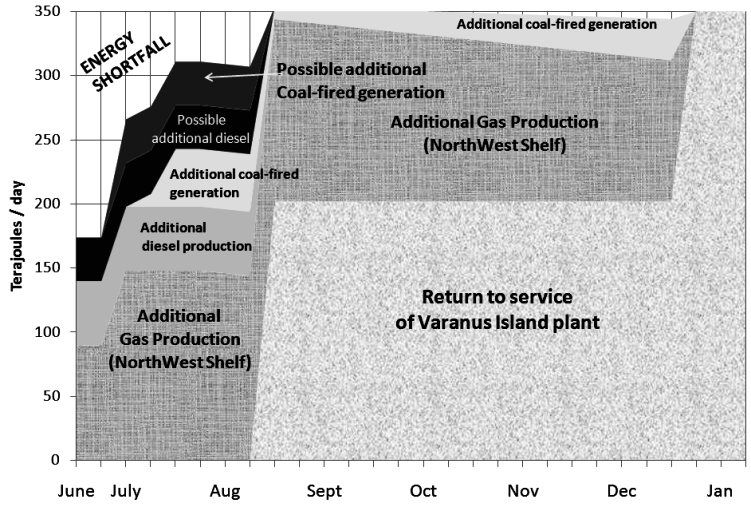
The WA Government's July 2008 projection of how the energy shortfall would be filled

While household gas supplies were largely unaffected, some businesses faced higher energy prices, most notably in the manufacturing and mining sectors. The supply disruption was partially mitigated by the availability of alternative fuel sources such as diesel (for power generation), additional supplies of gas from the North West Shelf plant, and the return to service of coal-fired power generation units.

Overall, the gas shortage had a large impact on Western Australian industries, particularly mining, construction, and hospitality. Some affected companies declared force majeure, and others are expected to make large insurance claims. If Apache Energy was found responsible for the pipeline explosion, compensation claims could be made against the company. State Premier Alan Carpenter said the Government will not offer compensation to businesses affected by the energy shortage, because "I don't think that the ordinary West Australian taxpayer would take too kindly to the State Government taking on a massive compensation bill for an interruption to a supply contract between commercial partners".

A survey of 301 businesses conducted by the Chamber of Commerce and Industry showed on 18 June 2008 that nearly 630 employees had already been, or could be, stood down or made redundant - nearly 1% of the workforce surveyed. Almost 50% were affected by the gas shortage, with 11 companies already completely shut down. Up to 15% of companies surveyed could potentially close after three months of energy shortages. Chief Economist John Nicolaou said "To the extent that WA represents about 20 percent of the growth in the national economy over the past year, then that means it is going to have broader implications for the national economy. So it's important people around Australia understand the issue is significant from a national perspective, not just WA's perspective."

Macquarie Group economists estimated the energy crisis could reduce gross domestic product growth by 0.25 percentage points in the third quarter, as gas prices increased and the percentage of gas production allocated to export reduced. Natural gas sales were worth $5.2 billion in the 2006/2007 financial year, and its five-year trend growth rate is 16.8%. Chief Macquarie economist Richard Gibbs said, "WA supplies the lion's share of the gas exports. The effect on exports is that as there is a shortage of gas in the system, the capability to export will be diminished because the gas that there is will be directed towards domestic use... The gas exports have been pretty healthy. In the next couple of quarters that will be moderated dramatically if not stalled altogether. I think this will have an impact on the broader commodities side and the trade gap could widen".

Modelling undertaken by the WA Department of Treasury and Finance estimated that the gas crisis would affect Western Australia's exports of chemicals, metal products, textiles, clothing, footwear and rubber and plastic products. Treasurer Eric Ripper said, "In the long term, the disruption is estimated to reduce WA's economic value by $1.8 billion between 2007 – 08 and 2011-12... this $1.8 billion figure (estimated at 2008–09 values), only equates to 0.2 percent of the economy over the same five-year period." The WA Chamber of Commerce and Industry (CCI) released its quarterly report on 10 July, which said, "The gas crisis has already cost the Western Australian economy in the vicinity of $2.4 billion... With gas supply expected to be restricted until December 2008, CCI estimates the overall cost to be around $6.7 billion".

The Reserve Bank reported in September that "the disruption is expected to result in a temporary reduction in national GDP growth of around 0.25%, with the impact spread across the June and September quarters".

=== Mining industry ===
Western Australian-based mining companies could have potentially lost hundreds of millions of dollars, because the state is the world's largest producer of iron ore and one of the largest producers of gold and nickel, exporting $48.4 billion of minerals and energy in 2006. Three days after the blast, the world's largest mining company, BHP Billiton, said it was assessing the gas shortage's impact, but its iron ore mines at Mount Newman and Nickel West were running normally. On 13 June, BHP Billiton brought forward the closure of its nickel smelter in Kalgoorlie by four months, which increased its gas supplies for its Worsley Alumina refinery. A spokesperson for Rio Tinto, the world's third-largest mining company, said the company was prioritising its power usage and using diesel and other alternative fuels for its mines, shipping terminals and railways. The world's third-biggest gold producer, Newmont, said it was "investigating alternative gas and energy sources", and Iluka Resources, the largest zircon producer, shut down its Western Australian operations on 5 June and said it was awaiting advice from power supplier Alinta. Oxiana Limited, soon to be the world's second-largest zinc producer, used standby diesel power at its Golden Grove mine until 6 June, when they obtained an alternative source. Newcrest, a gold mining company located at Telfer, switched to its limited stockpile of diesel fuel. Fonterra also switched to diesel power. Minara Resources, the country's second-largest nickel producer, was "using the time opportunistically on plant maintenance", as natural gas was its Murrin Murrin Mine's only energy source. Minara Resources predicted that its full-year production would be reduced by 8%. Alcoa, which operates bauxite mines and alumina refineries with Alumina, declared force majeure as a precaution on 11 June. A spokesperson said, "We are continuing production, which is down a bit, and we are fuelling our energy needs with diesel supply... we have enough diesel to last us for weeks, but not months". Alcoa's United States parent company said it expects the company's second-quarter earnings to be reduced by $12–17 million due to the extra cost of gas and diesel.

Woodside Petroleum's North West Shelf Venture increased production of natural gas to meet Apache Energy's shortfall. Apache's managing director Tim Wall said it was a small quantity of relief; Premier Carpenter said Woodside was providing an extra 50 terajoules of gas per day for the domestic energy grid.

=== Other industries, businesses and domestic customers ===
The construction and hospitality industries were strongly affected by the energy shortage. Brick producers Midland Brick and Austral closed their kilns within the first week after the blast, and on 11 June, the Chamber of Commerce and Industry warned that 14% of local businesses could close. UnionsWA said thousands of workers were being stood down or made to take annual leave, and the secretary Dave Robinson said mining, timber, beef, pork, laundries and transport industries workers were worst affected. Supplies of gas and electricity to residential customers are protected by state government legislation introduced in 2006.

The impact of the crisis on Wesfarmers' subsidiaries caused a slump in the company's share prices. Wesfarmers managing director, Richard Goyder, said, "At this stage, our best estimate is that the pre-tax impact on group profit will be up to $20 million per month at the current level of gas supply. A portion of that loss is expected to be recovered from insurance". The subsidiaries affected are CSBP, which can no longer produce ammonium nitrate, Wesfarmers LPG, which has delayed commissioning of a new liquid natural gas plant in WA, and Premier Coal, whose sales have been reduced due to the closure of some of its customers, such as Iluka Resources.

There was speculation in the media on whether the AFL football game at Subiaco Oval on 21 June between the West Coast Eagles and Geelong Football Club should be moved from night to daytime, to avoid using the oval's lights. According to Western Power, the electricity used by the oval's lights for four hours of operation could power more than 1,300 homes, but a spokesperson from the Office of Energy said, "Effectively the amount of energy used to light a game at night is less than what would be used if those thousands of people were at home with lights and other services operating". Western Australian Trotting Association chief executive, Rob Bovell, said if they were forced to move races at Gloucester Park from night to day, they would "probably lose half a million dollars in turnover and our customers would drop by 70 percent. Clearly this would cause major damage to us financially because our business is set up to race at night time. However if we are using energy that is affecting emergency services we will close down tomorrow."

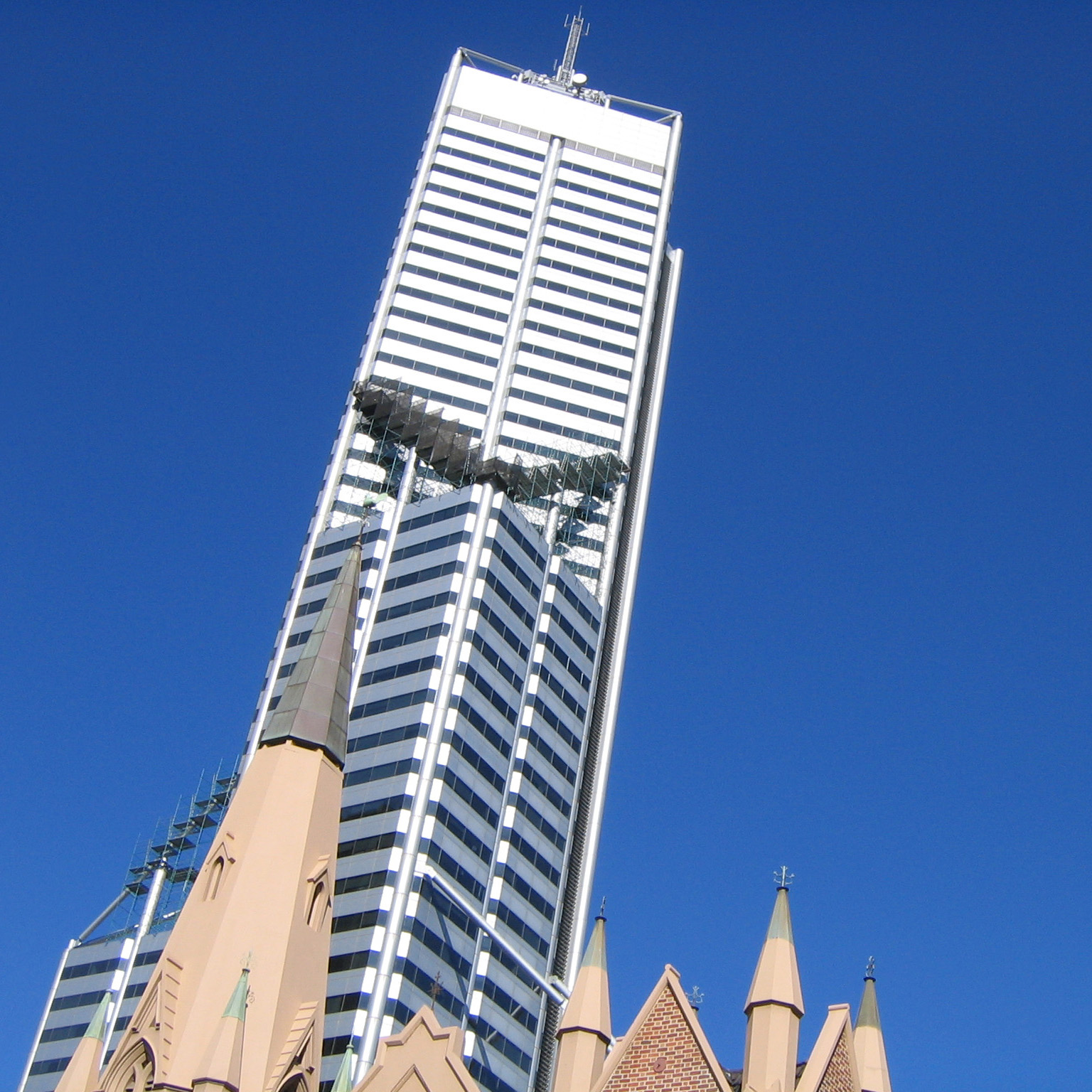
Central Park

Fifty representatives from shopping centres and office towers met on 16 June to discuss energy-saving ideas. The WA Property Council said "Non essential power including decorative lighting in shopping centres will be switched off. We'll also be looking at chillers and heating systems to ensure they use less power. At the moment we are in winter mode and they are running to heat the buildings so we will have to lower them, while main buildings will look at switching off non essential lifts". Perth's tallest building, Central Park, turned off its heating on 17 June, with General Manager Tim Ward saying, "We're not expecting anyone to be anything but compliant".

Royal Perth Hospital's plans for coping with decreased gas supplies were leaked to the media at the end of June, which showed a 30% reduction in gas would cause phase 1, changing linen "only when soiled" and having "one towel per patient". Phase 2, a further 20% decrease, would result in "reductions in elective surgical procedures", "prioritisation of equipment for sterilisation", sourcing oxygen supplies from interstate and restricting patients' showers to "four minutes, second daily". Further reductions could lead to cancellations in elective surgery, rationing food and transporting "infectious linen" interstate for laundering.

Industrial gas provider BOC reduced its supply of carbon dioxide to pubs for draft beer, whilst the shortage also threatened WA's wineries, who use carbon dioxide for bottling. BOC gave priority to the health industry, which uses carbon dioxide to sterilise equipment and in anaesthesia. The state's other major carbon dioxide supplier, Air Liquide, also shut down production, leading to fears that WA's largest pork abattoir would close.

Westpac offered help to personal customers affected by the gas crisis, by allowing customers to defer home loan repayments for up to three months and restructure loans at no fee, increasing credit card limits and speeding up insurance assessments. Other banks and credit-lenders offered similar assistance to their customers.

== Official inquiries ==
=== Technical investigation by NOPSA ===
Following a four-month investigation, the National Offshore Petroleum Safety Authority (NOPSA) handed down its report into the causes of the incident on 10 October 2008. Numbered copies of the 92-page report were made available to members of the public upon request to the Department of Mines & Petroleum.

According to the report, the plant was operating normally up until the incident. The immediate cause was the rupture of the 12" Sales Gas Pipeline at the NNE beach crossing, and that "the gas released from the ruptured pipeline ignited very soon after the rupture". The rupture of the pipeline was caused by corrosion of the external surface of the pipe "resulting in excessive stresses of the pipe wall". The report provides the likely sequence of events following the initial rupture, including the failures of other pipelines located near the 12" Sales Gas line, contributing to the intensity of the fire and damage to the gas plant. According to evidence available to NOPSA, the main causal factors in the incident were:

- ineffective anti-corrosion coating at the beach crossing section of the sales gas pipeline
- ineffective cathodic protection of the wet-dry transition zone of the beach crossing section of the pipeline, and
- ineffective inspection and monitoring by Apache Energy of the beach crossing and shallow water section of the pipeline.

A section of the report titled "Impediments to the Investigation" refers to the investigation team's frustrated attempts to interview staff of Apache Energy in relation to pipeline inspection, monitoring, and the company's maintenance and repair regime. The company declined to make its key personnel available for questioning by NOPSA. The investigators' efforts were also hampered by Apache's delays in releasing the results of laboratory analysis of pipeline materials related to the incident. Apache produced a comprehensive "corporate response" to a set of written questions provided by NOPSA, seven weeks after receiving the request. The report notes that "these matters directly impacted on the ability of the investigation team to develop its findings within the agreed time period and resulted in aspects of some lines of inquiry not being fully settled".

The report identified that Apache and its co-licensees may have committed offences under the Petroleum Pipelines Act and associated regulations, and that there may have been non-compliance with pipeline license conditions.

=== Senate inquiry ===
On 28 August 2008, the Senate referred a number of matters relating to the gas crisis to its Standing Committee on Economics. The inquiry focussed on the economic impact of the crisis (losses faced by business and industry; relevance of contractual arrangements) and government responses (crisis management; emergency measures; alternative energy sources). Written submissions were made by numerous business and industry bodies, and six days of public hearings in Perth, Bunbury and Canberra were held during October. Written submissions to the inquiry included claims of unfair allocations of gas, inadequate communication of important information during the crisis, and the scale of the impact on individual businesses and industries. The committee was initially expected to report by 13 November 2008. The Committee tabled its 84-page report on 3 December 2008, listing six key recommendations to minimise the impacts and risks of future supply disruption, including developing a comprehensive energy security plan, and changing the methods of allocating remaining supplies during a major disruption.

In terms of the macroeconomic impact of the gas crisis, the Committee relied heavily upon State Treasury forecasts provided during its inquiry, including that "the June 2008 disruption in gas supplies... is expected to cost the Western Australian economy around $2 billion in Gross State Product (GSP) terms, with roughly half of this impact in each of the June and September quarters of 2008. This translates to approximately a 0.5 percentage point reduction in estimated GSP growth in 2007-08, from 7.5% at budget-time to 7.0%." The report refers to the Reserve Bank's modelling of the national impact of the crisis, "that the disruption is expected to result in a temporary reduction in national GDP growth of around 0.25 percentage point, spread across the June and September quarters... as national GDP is around a trillion dollars, a 0.25 percentage point represents about $2½ billion, so the Reserve Bank estimate is broadly consistent with that of the Western Australian Treasury."

In assessing the state government's response to the crisis, the report recommended that the newly elected state government honour the Carpenter government's pledge on 6 August 2008 to develop an energy security plan. The plan should include possible contingency options, but warned any contingency option that would be of sufficient scope to mitigate significantly the impact of a gas shortage on the scale of that experience after the Varanus Island incident would be very expensive and could present significant technical and environmental challenges."

The inquiry examined the mechanisms and emergency supply protocols established by the WA government to mitigate the effects of the crisis. According to the committee, the protocols were appropriate, and the residential supply "was crucial to ensure that negative health impacts were minimised, particularly as the incident occurred in winter." The Committee said it received submissions that the campaign to reduce household gas consumption "was misplaced as (households) only directly account for around three to five per cent of overall gas consumption." However, the Committee concluded that the campaign was appropriate under the circumstances.

The document contained a 15-page dissenting report written by the five Coalition members of the committee. This report directly criticised the Labor government's lack of a contingency gas supply plan, despite two previous supply disruptions in 2006 and early 2008. The government "ignored these precedents, as well as industry advice, to develop an appropriate contingency response plan to deal with such a crisis and accordingly deserves strong criticism". The government's communication with industry and customers was "sporadic at best", and it should have declared a state of emergency to control gas distribution, rather than leaving distribution to market forces and a bulletin board system.

=== Joint Commonwealth-State inquiry ===
On 23 December 2008, the State Government formally announced a joint inquiry (funded by the Commonwealth) into the Varanus Island gas disaster. To be set up as a 2-person expert panel inquiry and expected to conclude by April 2009, it will "focus on the effectiveness of the regulatory system and the regulators for upstream petroleum operations and recommend improvements to the existing system." According to the new WA Premier, Colin Barnett, the original inquiry focussed solely on the cause of the explosion, rather than considering surrounding issues. The Premier said that any recommendations arising from the report would ultimately be referred to the Ministerial Council on Mineral and Petroleum Resources (MCMPR) for implementation.

== 2012 report release ==
On 24 May 2012, the Western Australian government's minister for Mines and Petroleum Norman Moore tabled in parliament the Bills-Agostini Report, and further public comment has come from lawyers representing Apache in response.
