= Preston Settlement, Western Australia =

Locality in the Shire of Collie, Western Australia

Preston Settlement
- other
- Coordinates: 33.41°S 116.16°E
- Country: Australia
- State: Western Australia
- LGA: Shire of Collie
- Location: 164 km (102 mi) from Perth; 50 km (31 mi) from Bunbury; 6 km (3.7 mi) from Collie

Government
  - State electorate: Collie-Preston
  - Federal division: O'Connor

Area
  - Total: 42.6 km^{2} (16.4 sq mi)

Population
  - Total: 125 (SAL 2021)
- Postcode: 6225
Localities around Preston Settlement
Collie	Collie	Collie Burn
Mungalup	Preston Settlement	Cardiff
Lyalls Mill	Lyalls Mill	Cardiff

Preston Settlement is a rural locality of the Shire of Collie in the South West region of Western Australia.

Preston Settlement is located on the traditional land of the Kaniyang and Wiilman people of the Noongar nation.
