= Collie Burn, Western Australia =

Locality in the Shire of Collie, Western Australia

Collie Burn
- Town
- Coordinates: 33.40°S 116.19°E
- Country: Australia
- State: Western Australia
- LGA: Shire of Collie
- Location: 160 km (99 mi) from Perth; 50 km (31 mi) from Bunbury; 6 km (3.7 mi) from Collie

Government
  - State electorate: Collie-Preston
  - Federal division: O'Connor

Area
  - Total: 13.6 km^{2} (5.3 sq mi)

Population
  - Total: 55 (SAL 2016)
- Postcode: 6225
Localities around Collie Burn
Collie	Shotts	Shotts
Preston Settlement	Collie Burn	Shotts
Preston Settlement	Cardiff	Cardiff

Collie Burn is a rural town in the Shire of Collie in the South West region of Western Australia.

The requirement for a townsite in the area to service Collie Burn and Collie Cardiff coal mines was identified in 1902. The original townsite of Collieburn, midway between the two mines, was gazetted in 1907. The name Collieburn was chosen as another Cardiff already existed in Australia. By 1915 the main requirement for land had shifted to the Cardiff end of the townsite of Collieburn. Subsequently, the Cardiff Progress Association sought to rename the town of Collieburn to Cardiff. This name change was approved, but only of the southern portion of the townsite, and the name for this part was officially changed to Cardiff in 1916. The name of the remaining townsite was subsequently spelled as Collie-Burn, but the hyphen was dropped in 1944. The name results from the Collie River while Burn is supposed to derive from the old English word for a stream or river.

Collie Burn is located on the traditional land of the Kaniyang and Wiilman people of the Noongar nation.
