= Cardiff, Western Australia =

Locality in the Shire of Collie, Western Australia

Cardiff
- Town
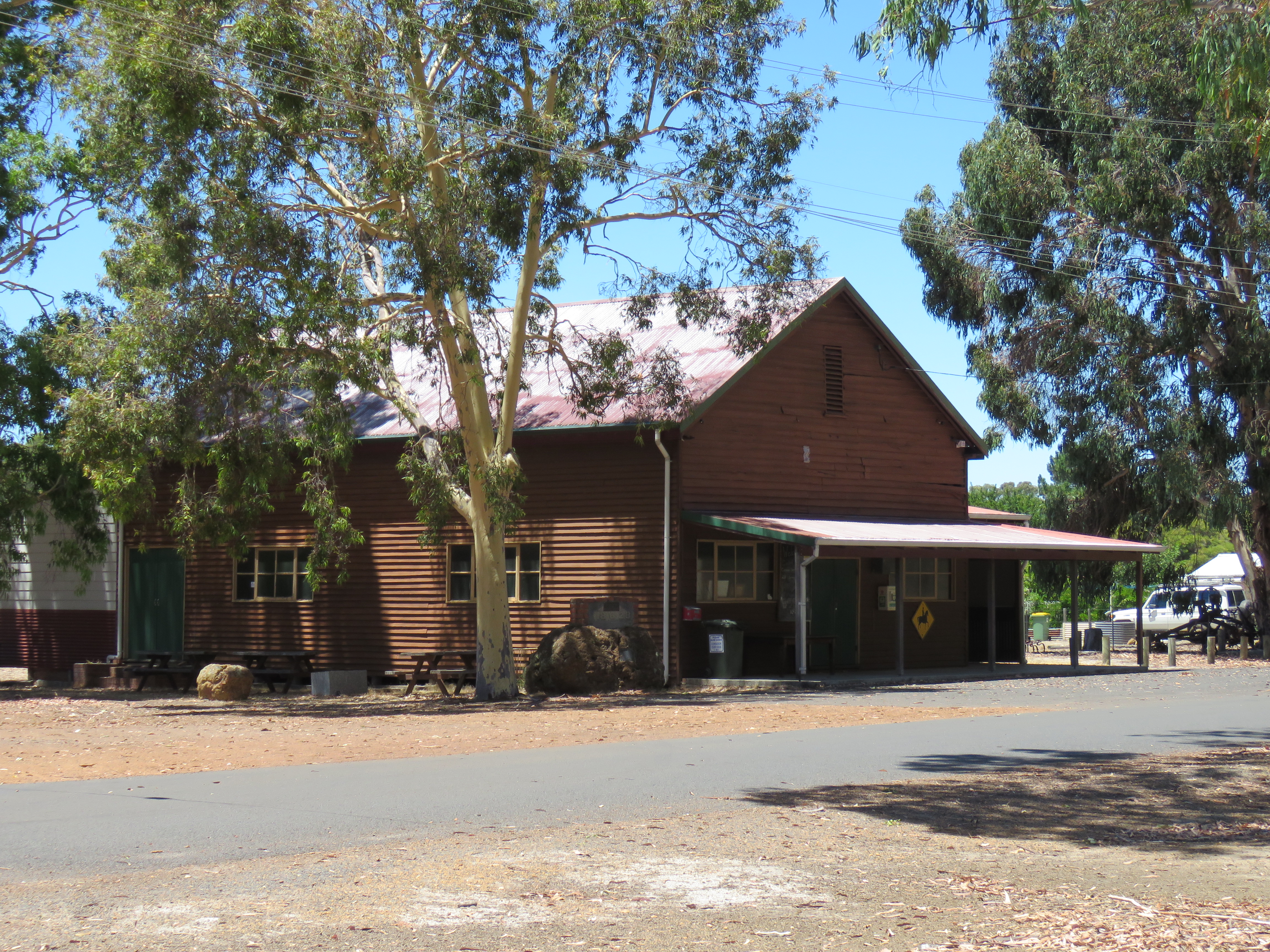
- Cardiff Public Hall in January 2026
- Interactive map of Cardiff
- Coordinates: 33.47°S 116.30°E
- Country: Australia
- State: Western Australia
- LGA: Shire of Collie
- Location: 170 km (110 mi) from Perth; 55 km (34 mi) from Bunbury; 10 km (6.2 mi) from Collie

Government
  - State electorate: Collie-Preston
  - Federal division: O'Connor

Area
  - Total: 171 km^{2} (66 sq mi)

Population
  - Total: 118 (SAL 2021)
- Postcode: 6225
Localities around Cardiff
Preston Settlement	Collie Burn	Shotts
Lyalls Mill	Cardiff	Muja
Mumballup	McAlinden	Bowelling

Cardiff is a rural town in the Shire of Collie in the South West region of Western Australia.

== History ==
The requirement for a townsite in the area was identified in 1902, and the original townsite of Collieburn gazetted in 1907, halfway between Collie and the current locality of Cardiff. By 1915 the main requirement for land had shifted to the Cardiff end of the townsite of Collieburn. Subsequently, the Cardiff Progress Association sought to rename the town to Cardiff. This name change was approved, but only of the southern portion of the townsite, and the name was officially changed in 1916. It was originally declared as Collie-Cardiff, but the hyphen was dropped in 1944. The name results from being located in the Collie coalfields, with the original Cardiff being the name of the coal mining city in Wales.

The town is home to 17 heritage-listed sites, among them the former Cardiff Mine Site, the Cardiff Public Hall and 14 heritage listed houses.

The mining operations at the Cardiff colliery lasted from 1900 to 1960, were located south of the current townsite and connected by railway to Collie as a branch line of the South Western railway line. The former mine open pits subsequently filled with water from the Collie River and the largest one now forms Lake Kepwari.

Cardiff is located on the traditional land of the Kaniyang and Wiilman people of the Noongar nation.
