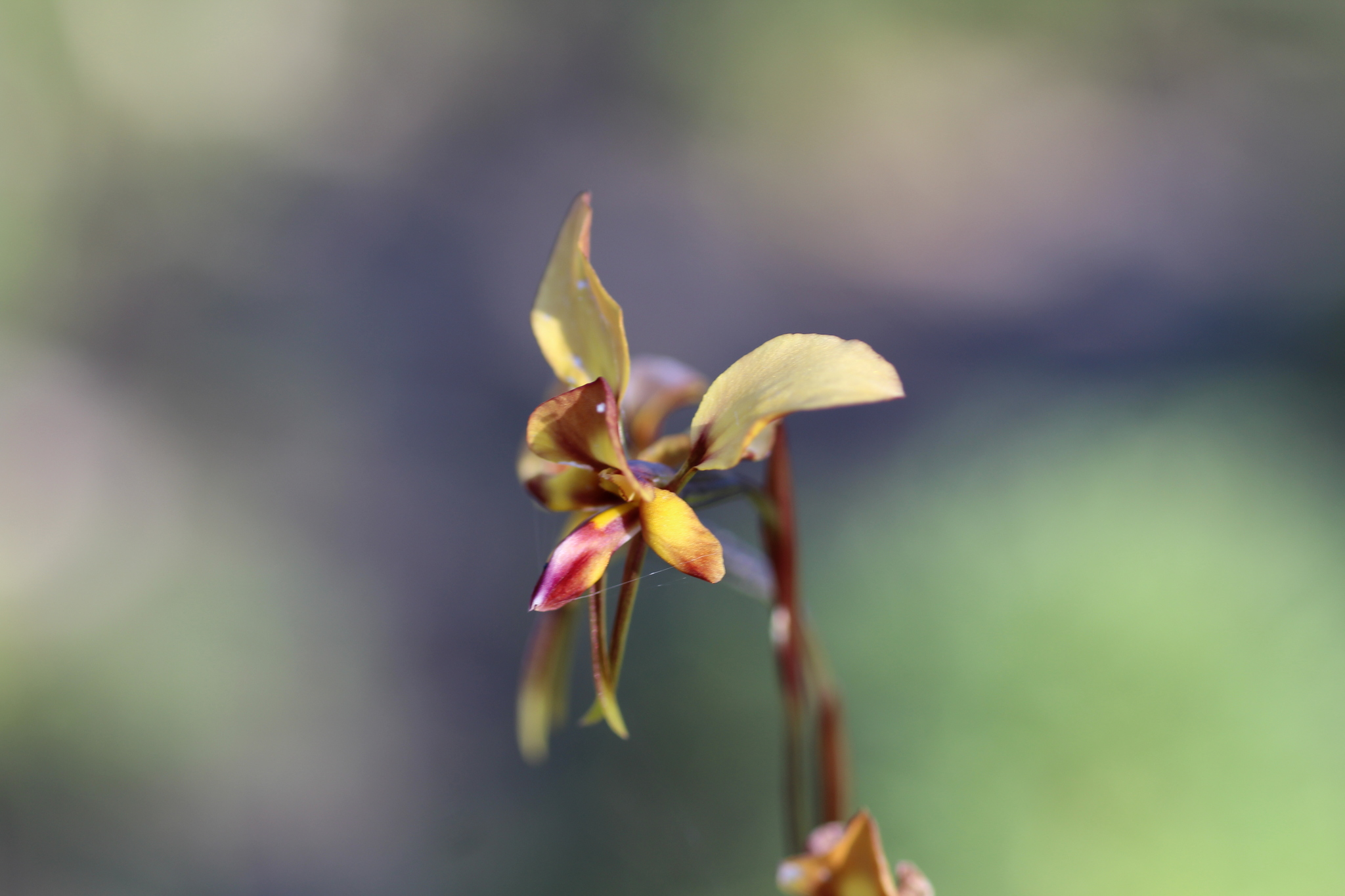
- In Yalgorup National Park

Scientific classification
- Kingdom: Plantae
- Clade: Tracheophytes
- Clade: Angiosperms
- Clade: Monocots
- Order: Asparagales
- Family: Orchidaceae
- Subfamily: Orchidoideae
- Tribe: Diurideae
- Genus: Diuris
- Species: D. porphyrochila

Binomial name
- Diuris porphyrochila D.L.Jones & C.J.French

= Diuris porphyrochila =

Yalgorup donkey orchid

Species of orchid

Diuris porphyrochila, commonly known as Yalgorup donkey orchid, is a species of orchid that is endemic to the south-west of Western Australia. It has two or three linear to lance-shaped leaves and a flowering stem with up to eight yellow flowers with brown to reddish-brown and purple markings.

== Description ==
Diuris porphyrochila is a tuberous, perennial herb, with two or three linear to lance-shaped leaves 100–200 mm (3.9–7.9 in) long and 6–10 mm (0.24–0.39 in) wide. Up to eight yellow flowers with brown to reddish-brown and purple markings are borne on a flowering stem 150–600 mm (5.9–23.6 in) high. The dorsal sepal is egg-shaped, 8–12 mm (0.31–0.47 in) long, 12–16 mm (0.47–0.63 in) wide and heavily stained reddish-brown. The lateral sepals are narrowly oblong, crossed with curved tips, 14–22 mm (0.55–0.87 in) long and 2–3 mm (0.079–0.118 in) wide. The petals are elliptic to broadly elliptic, 12–17 mm (0.47–0.67 in) long, 8–13 mm (0.31–0.51 in) wide on a stalk 3–5 mm (0.12–0.20 in) long and stained with brown. The labellum is 7–13 mm (0.28–0.51 in) long with three lobes - the centre lobe broadly wedge-shaped, 7–13 mm (0.28–0.51 in) long and 8–11 mm (0.31–0.43 in) wide, the side lobes oblong to egg-shaped, 9–12 mm (0.35–0.47 in) long and 5–7 mm (0.20–0.28 in) wide. There is a single smooth, yellow callus ridge 4–5 mm (0.16–0.20 in) long, along the mid-line of the labellum. Flowering occurs from late August to early October.

== Taxonomy and naming ==
Diuris porphyrochila was first formally described in 2016 by David Jones and Christopher French in Australian Orchid Review from specimens collected near Wellington Dam in 1997. The specific epithet (porphyrochila) means "purple lip", referring to the colour of the labellum.

== Distribution and habitat ==
Yalgorup donkey orchid grows in forest in sand in near-coastal areas from south of Mandurah to Busselton, possibly as far south as Margaret River in the Jarrah Forest and Swan Coastal Plain bioregions of south-western Western Australia.

== Conservation ==
Diuris porphyrochila is listed as "not threatened" by the Western Australian Government Department of Biodiversity, Conservation and Attractions.
