= Griffin Coal =

Coal mine near Collie, Western Australia

- Interactive map of Griffin Coal
- Location: Shire of Collie, Western Australia, Australia; 33°25′37″S 116°18′59″E
- Products: Coal
- Opened: 1923; 103 years ago
- Company: Griffin Coal Mining, a subsidiary of Lanco Infratech
- Website: www.griffincoal.com.au
- Acquired: 2011; 15 years ago

Western Australia Heritage Register
- Official name: Bucryus Erie Dragline
- Type: Municipal Inventory
- Designated: 30 Apr 1996
- Reference no.: 6345
- Municipality: Shire of Collie

Griffin Coal is a large coal mine near the town of Collie in Western Australia, producing about 2.5 million tonnes (5.5 billion pounds) of coal annually. In September 2022 its current owner, the Griffin Coal Mining Company, a subsidiary of Lanco Infratech, entered receivership. In December 2022 the Government of Western Australia announced a grant – effectively a loan – to the receivers and managers of the insolvent mine to enable it to continue supplying the privately-owned Bluewaters Power Station over the Western Australian summer.

== History ==
The mine was in operation in the 1930s and was a supplier of coal to the Western Australian Government Railways, in competition with Newcastle Coal.

In January 2011, the owner defaulted on debts of $475 million, and sought outside buyers. Two months later, it was acquired by the Indian firm Lanco Infratech for $730 million. The logic of the purchase has been questioned in the business media, as the company has faced difficulties and has been forced to defer pension and other payments to suppliers.

Since the purchase in 2011, major concerns have been raised about the financial viability of the mine. In 2016, workers went on strike following paycuts of 43% to 70 maintenance workers. In 2019, it was estimated that the mine was losing $6 million a month, with total losses since 2011 running up to $1.3 billion. In 2021, Griffin Coal invoked force majeure in response to large-scale rainfall affecting coal pit operations. State politicians raised concerns that the force majeure declaration was indicative of the poor financial state of the company. Later in the year, the company was fined for a failure to pay former mine manager Carna Civil and Engineering, who ran the mine for a 9 month period between March and December 2014. In November 2021, the Australian Securities & Investments Commission (ASIC) filed criminal charges against the owner, alleging that the company had failed to lodge audited financial accounts for the 2019 and 2020 financial years. The case was later expanded to include charges over the company's failure to have an Australian director.

Concern has been expressed over the possibility of bankruptcy, as the Griffin mine acts as the sole supplier of coal to the Bluewaters Power Station, responsible for generating approximately 15% of Western Australia's electricity. Griffin also acts as a supplier to South32's Worsley alumina refinery.
