= Mungalup, Western Australia =

Locality in the Shire of Collie, Western Australia

Mungalup
- Town
- Coordinates: 33.40°S 116.10°E
- Country: Australia
- State: Western Australia
- LGA: Shire of Collie
- Location: 162 km (101 mi) from Perth; 44 km (27 mi) from Bunbury; 7 km (4.3 mi) from Collie

Government
  - State electorate: Collie-Preston
  - Federal division: O'Connor

Area
  - Total: 74.3 km^{2} (28.7 sq mi)

Population
  - Total: 53 (SAL 2021)
- Postcode: 6225
Localities around Mungalup
| Wellington Forest | Allanson | Collie |
| Wellington Forest | Mungalup | Preston Settlement |
| Wellington Forest | Yabberup | Lyalls Mill |

Mungalup is a rural town and locality of the Shire of Collie in the South West region of Western Australia.

The town of Mungalup is located within the eastern part of the locality and in a state forest, with a reserve in this state forest being used to cut sleepers for the railway lines in the early 1900s. Sleepers were transported by tram line to Collie and the local sleeper cutters lived in basic huts in the area. The area was surveyed and gazetted in 1906, with a number of names suggested for the new townsite, among them Lucknow, used locally, and Hearnshawville, after a local politician. Eventually, the name Mungalupp, of unknown origin, was chosen, and was changed to Mungalup in 1925.

Mungalup is located on the traditional land of the Kaniyang and Wiilman people of the Noongar nation.

Mungalup is the location of Mungalup Dam, opened in November 1934 by the Deputy Premier of Western Australia, Alick McCallum, as a water supply for Collie.
