= Shire of Collie =

Coordinates: 33°21′47″S 116°09′22″E

- Local government area
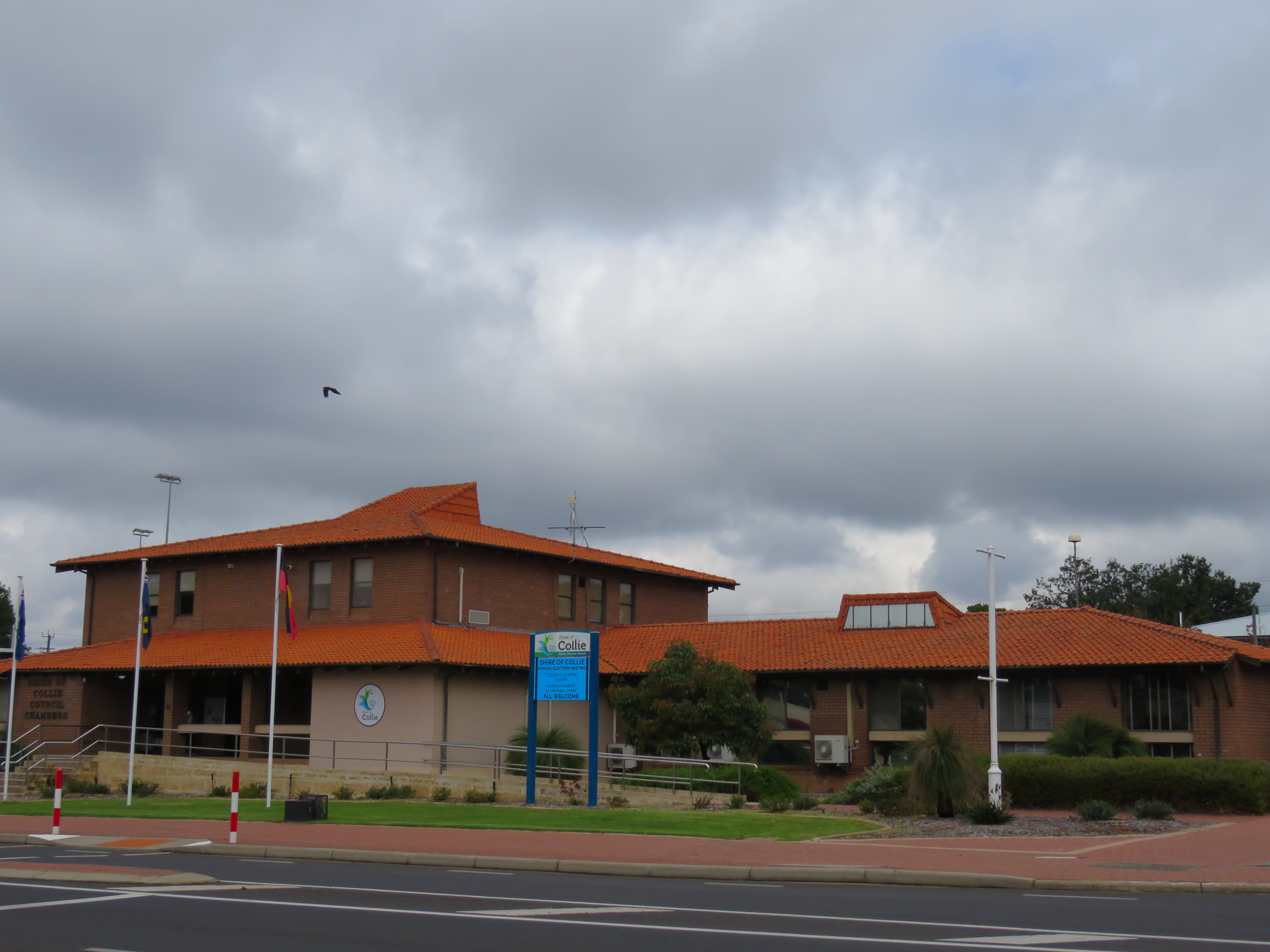
- The Collie shire offices in April 2022

- Interactive map of Shire of Collie
- Country: Australia
- State: Western Australia
- Region: South West
- Established: 1900
- Council seat: Collie

Government
  - Shire President: Ian Miffling
  - State electorate: Collie-Preston
  - Federal division: O'Connor

Area
  - Total: 1,710.9 km^{2} (660.6 sq mi)

Population
  - Total: 8,812 (LGA 2021)
- Website: Shire of Collie
LGAs around Shire of Collie
Harvey	Boddington	Williams
Harvey	Shire of Collie	West Arthur
Dardanup	Donnybrook-Balingup	Boyup Brook

The Shire of Collie is a local government area in the South West region of Western Australia, about 60 kilometres (37 mi) east of Bunbury and about 200 kilometres (124 mi) south of the state capital, Perth. The Shire covers an area of 1,711 square kilometres (661 sq mi), and its seat of government is the town of Collie.

== History ==
The Shire of Collie originated in the amalgamation of the Municipality of Collie (1901) and the Collie Road District (1900) to form the Collie Coalfields Road District on 2 March 1951. It was declared a shire and named the Shire of Collie with effect from 1 July 1961 following the passage of the Local Government Act 1960, which reformed all remaining road districts into shires.

== Indigenous people ==
The Shire of Collie is located on the traditional land of the Kaniyang and Wiilman people of the Noongar nation.

== Wards ==
The shire is no longer divided into wards and the eleven councillors sit at large.

== Towns and localities ==
The towns and localities of the Shire of Collie with population and size figures based on the most recent Australian census:

Locality	Population	Area	Map
Allanson	591 (SAL 2021)	24.2 km^{2} (9.3 sq mi)	
Buckingham	27 (SAL 2021)	70.6 km^{2} (27.3 sq mi)	
Cardiff	118 (SAL 2021)	171 km^{2} (66 sq mi)	
Collie	7,599 (SAL 2021)	53.4 km^{2} (20.6 sq mi)	
Collie Burn	55 (SAL 2016)	13.6 km^{2} (5.3 sq mi)	
Harris River	98 (SAL 2021)	152.1 km^{2} (58.7 sq mi)	
Lyalls Mill	17 (SAL 2021)	38.1 km^{2} (14.7 sq mi)	
Muja	18 (SAL 2016)	57.1 km^{2} (22.0 sq mi)	
Mungalup	53 (SAL 2021)	74.3 km^{2} (28.7 sq mi)	
Palmer	50 (SAL 2021)	157.6 km^{2} (60.8 sq mi)	
Preston Settlement	125 (SAL 2021)	42.6 km^{2} (16.4 sq mi)	
Shotts	9 (SAL 2021)	75.1 km^{2} (29.0 sq mi)	
Worsley	39 (SAL 2021)	212.9 km^{2} (82.2 sq mi)	
Yourdamung Lake	14 (SAL 2021)	558.3 km^{2} (215.6 sq mi)	

== Notable councillors ==
- John Ewing, Collie Roads Board chairman 1905; also a state MP
- Herbert Wells, mayor of Collie 1908–1909, 1911–1913; later a state MP
- Bob Pike, Collie Shire Council 1957–1970, shire president 1962–1970; later a state MP

== Heritage-listed places ==
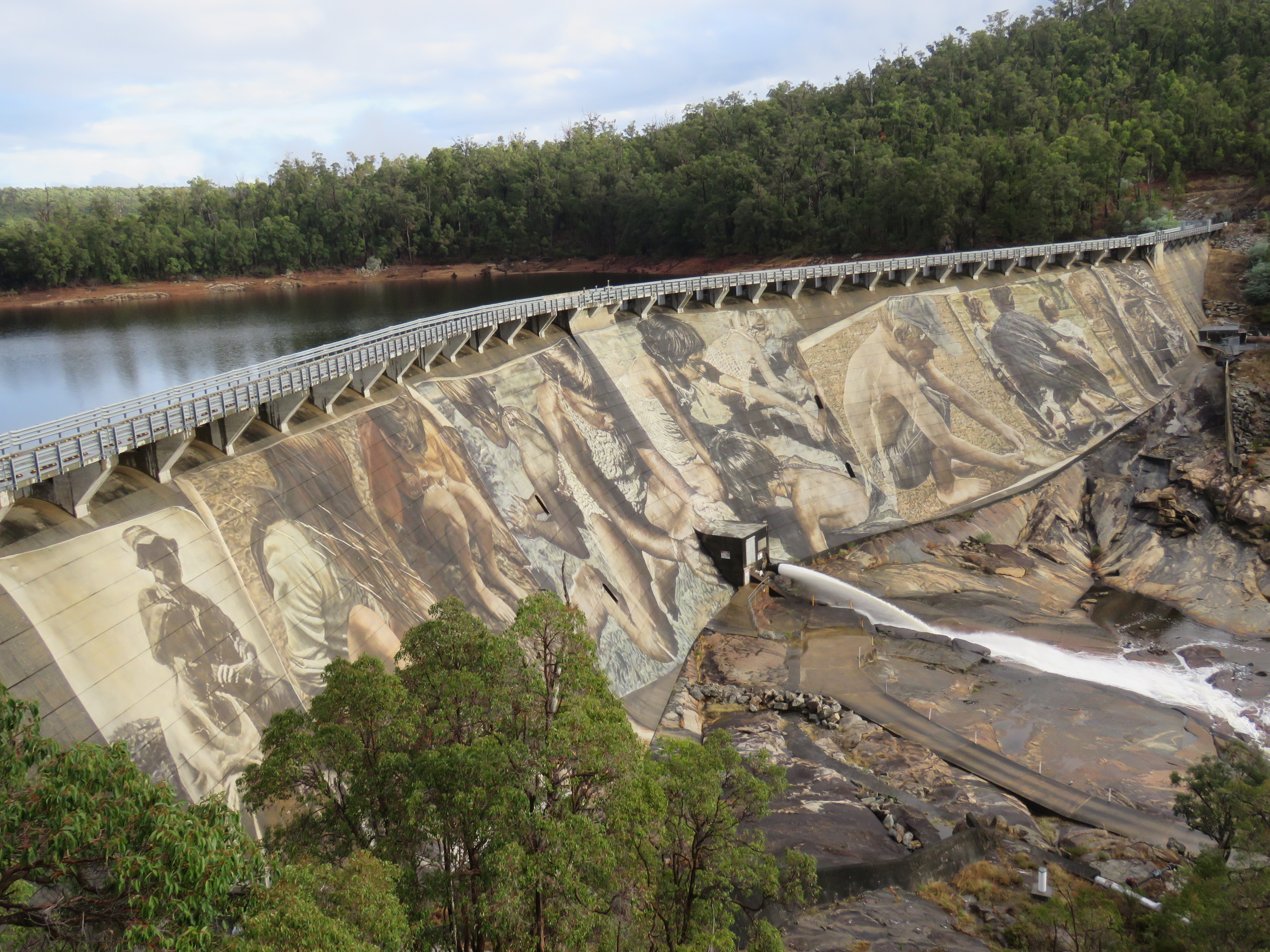
Heritage-listed Wellington Dam

As of 2023, 198 places are heritage-listed in the Shire of Collie, of which eight are on the State Register of Heritage Places, among them Wellington Dam.
