= Harris River, Western Australia =

Locality in the Shire of Collie, Western Australia

Harris River
- other
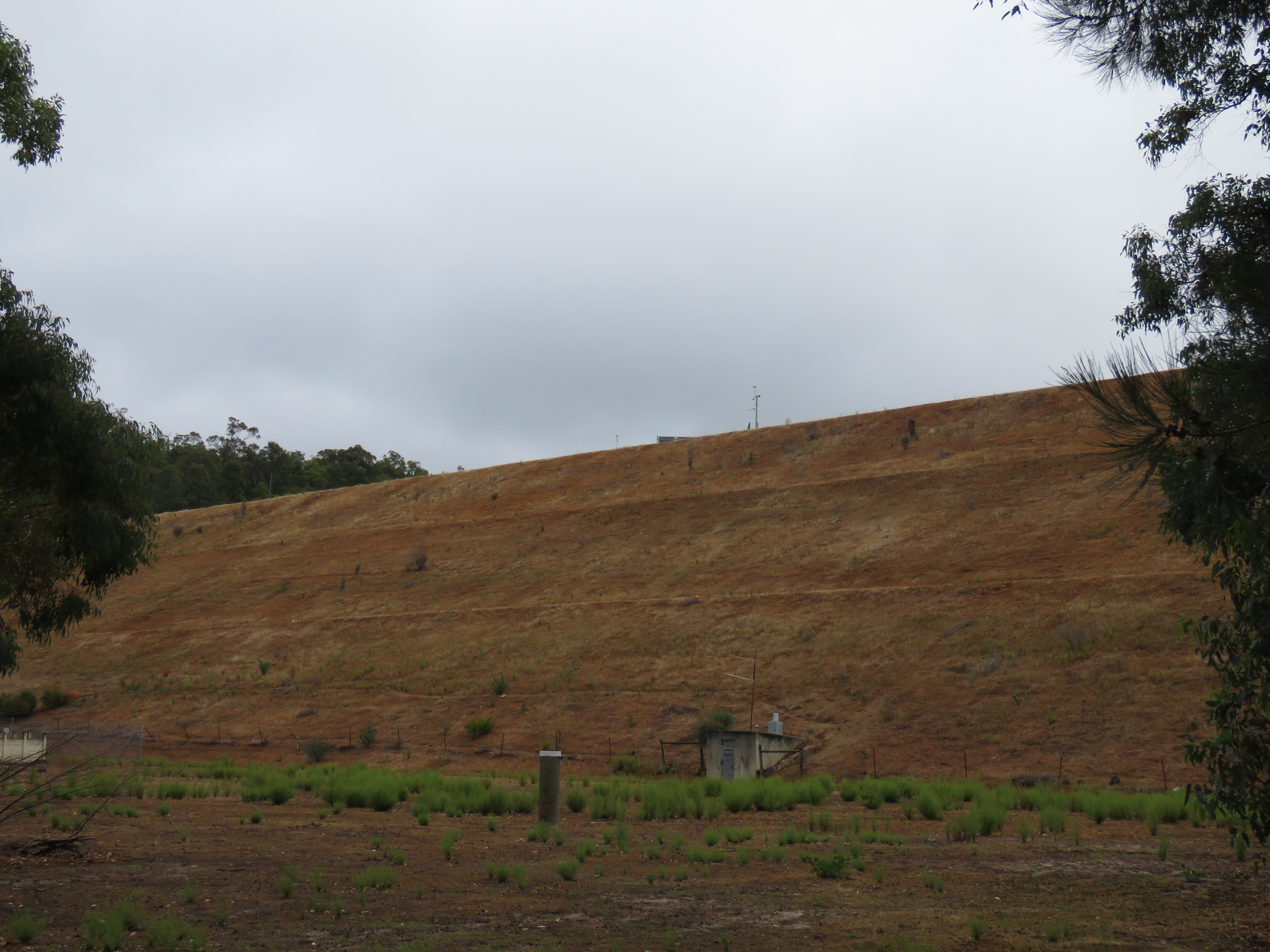
- Harris Dam in April 2022
- Coordinates: 33.28°S 116.12°E
- Country: Australia
- State: Western Australia
- LGA: Shire of Collie
- Location: 150 km (93 mi) from Perth; 46 km (29 mi) from Bunbury; 5 km (3.1 mi) from Collie

Government
  - State electorate: Collie-Preston
  - Federal division: O'Connor

Area
  - Total: 152.1 km^{2} (58.7 sq mi)

Population
  - Total: 98 (SAL 2021)
- Postcode: 6225
Localities around Harris River
Mornington	Yourdamung Lake	Yourdamung Lake
Worsley	Harris River	Palmer
Allanson	Collie	Palmer

Harris River is a predominantly forested rural locality of the Shire of Collie in the South West region of Western Australia.

Harris River is located on the traditional land of the Wiilman people of the Noongar nation.
