= Palmer, Western Australia =

Locality in the Shire of Collie, Western Australia

Palmer
- other
- Coordinates: 33.30°S 116.21°E
- Country: Australia
- State: Western Australia
- LGA: Shire of Collie
- Location: 155 km (96 mi) from Perth; 56 km (35 mi) from Bunbury; 10 km (6.2 mi) from Collie

Government
  - State electorate: Collie-Preston
  - Federal division: O'Connor

Area
  - Total: 157.6 km^{2} (60.8 sq mi)

Population
  - Total: 50 (SAL 2021)
- Postcode: 6225
Localities around Palmer
Harris River	Yourdamung Lake	Yourdamung Lake
Harris River	Palmer	Yourdamung Lake
Collie	Shotts	Buckingham

Palmer is a rural locality of the Shire of Collie in the South West region of Western Australia. The southern part of the locality, south of the Collie–Williams Road, is dominated by coal mining and the Collie Power Station, while the remainder is split between state forest and farm land.

Palmer is located on the traditional land of the Kaniyang and Wiilman people of the Noongar nation.
