= Allanson, Western Australia =

Allanson
- Town
- Interactive map of Allanson
- Coordinates: 33.33°S 116.1°E
- Country: Australia
- State: Western Australia
- LGA: Shire of Collie
- Location: 195 km (121 mi) south of Perth; 6 km (3.7 mi) west of Collie; 26 km (16 mi) east of Brunswick Junction
- Established: 1912

Government
  - State electorate: Collie-Preston
  - Federal division: O'Connor

Area
  - Total: 24.2 km^{2} (9.3 sq mi)
- Elevation: 190 m (620 ft)

Population
  - Total: 515 (UCL 2021)
- Postcode: 6225
Localities around Allanson
Worsley	Harris River	Harris River
Worsley	Allanson	Collie
Wellington Forest	Mungalup	Collie

Allanson is a town on the banks of the Collie River in the South West region of Western Australia, 8 kilometres (5.0 mi) by road west-northwest of Collie. The Coalfields Highway passes through the town.

The land is located within the boundaries of Nyoongar boodja, the land of the Nyoongar people, who lived in the area prior to forced colonisation.

Land was originally set aside for coal miners so that they could live close to the mines in 1898. A railway station named West Collie opened in the same year. The original townsite, also called West Collie, was gazetted in 1906. The original townsite was later discovered to be placed over commercially viable coal seams so a new townsite was founded in 1911 located a short distance from the original.

The new town was gazetted in 1912 and its name was changed in 1916 to Allanson. The town was named after an MLA for the seat of Collie, Arthur Alan Wilson, who was in office from 1908 to 1947.

Allanson restored its original bush school in 2002 after it operated in the town from 1911 to 1989 before being closed. A book A History of Allanson: Our Little Bush School has been written about people's memories of the school and community.
