= Statutory body =

Entity set up by a legislature to implement its reforms

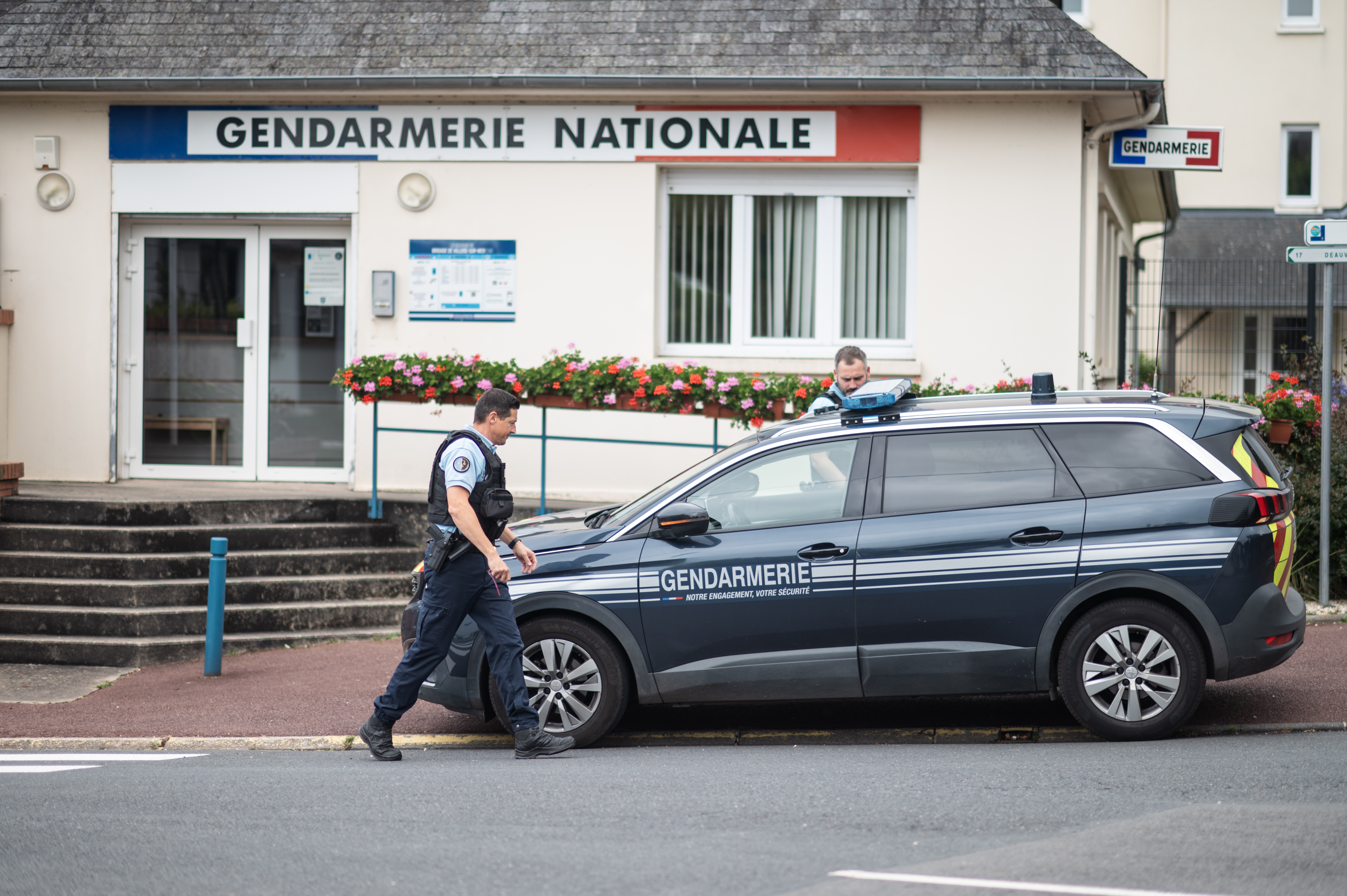
National Gendarmerie, France, a state police force in front of a Gendarmerie station

A statutory body or statutory authority is a body set up by law (statute) that is authorised to implement certain legislation on behalf of the relevant country or state, sometimes by being empowered or delegated to set rules (for example regulations or statutory instruments) in their field. They are typically found in countries which are governed by a British style of parliamentary democracy such as the United Kingdom and the Commonwealth countries like Australia, Canada, India and New Zealand. They are also found in Hong Kong, Israel and elsewhere. Statutory authorities may also be statutory corporations, if created as a body corporate.

== Australia ==
=== Definitions ===
Federal statutory authorities are established under the Public Governance, Performance and Accountability Act 2013. "A statutory authority is a generic term for an authorisation by Parliament given to a person or group of people to exercise specific powers. A statutory authority can be established as a corporate Commonwealth entity or a non-corporate Commonwealth entity. A statutory authority may also be a body within a Commonwealth entity, exercising the powers given by Parliament but administratively part of the entity."

A statutory corporation is defined in the government glossary as a "statutory body that is a body corporate, including an entity created under section 87 of the PGPA Act" (i.e. a statutory authority may be a statutory corporation). An earlier definition describes a statutory corporation as "a statutory authority that is a body corporate", and the New South Wales Government's Land Registry Services defines a state-owned corporation as "a statutory authority that has corporate status".

Statutory authorities at the State or Territory level are established under corresponding State or Territory laws. Each statutory authority tends to have its own enabling legislation, or originating act, even if it was established before the relevant over-riding legislation. For example, the Commonwealth Scientific and Industrial Research Organisation (CSIRO) was established in 1949 by the Science and Industry Research Act, but it has since come under the jurisdiction of the Commonwealth Authorities and Companies Act 1997 in the past, and now Public Governance, Performance and Accountability Act 2013 (Cth) as legislation covering statutory authorities has evolved.

Laws made by statutory authorities are usually referred to as regulations. They are not cited in the same fashion as an act of parliament, but usually with specific initials (depending on the authority) and a number.

Just as with laws enacted by Parliament, all laws made by a statutory authority must be published in the Government Gazette.

=== Rationale ===
The Parliament of Australia, or a State or Territory Parliament, will delegate its authority to a statutory authority for several reasons;

- Efficiency – State and Federal Parliaments do not have the time nor resources to investigate, analyse, draft, enact and monitor laws for every area of our increasingly complex society. By delegation of legislative power to a statutory authority, a specialist body may subrogate parliament and use its authority in a more efficient manner
- Bipartisanship – Statutory authorities are usually responsible for areas of legislation where there is a common goal or direction desirable within the community. Delegation of authority away from parliament prevents these areas of law from becoming partisan issues.
- Transparency – The disclosure requirements placed upon statutory authorities are generally stricter than that of State and Federal Parliaments; statutory authorities cannot rely upon the same government secrets provisions as can State and Federal governments.
- Accountability – The jurisdiction of a statutory authority is expressly set out in its corresponding act (i.e. the Act of Parliament which created the statutory authority). This, therefore, makes switching, sharing or evasion of responsibility in the instance of a scandal more difficult for officers of the statutory authority.

=== Statutory authorities in Australia ===
The power to enact legislation has been delegated by Australian Parliaments (State and/or Federal) in the following areas;

- Consumer affairs – Where authority is delegated to the Australian Competition & Consumer Commission
- Road and traffic safety – Where authority is delegated to various bodies by state, for example, VicRoads in Victoria
- Public transport – Where authority is delegated to various bodies by state, for example, Public Transport Authority in Western Australia.
- Collection of taxes – Where authority is delegated to the Australian Taxation Office
- Corporate law – Where authority is delegated to the Australian Securities & Investments Commission
- Prudential regulation – Where authority is delegated to the Australian Prudential Regulation Authority
- Monetary policy – Where authority is delegated to the Reserve Bank of Australia established by an Act of Parliament, the Reserve Bank Act 1959, which gives it specific powers and obligations.
- Workplace health and safety – Where authority is delegated to Safe Work Australia and to various bodies by state, for example, WorkSafe in Victoria and subsidiaries such as the Accident Compensation Conciliation Service
- Communications and media – For example, Australian Communications & Media Authority is responsible for the regulation of broadcasting, the internet, radiocommunications and telecommunications.
- Offshore petroleum activities – Where authority is delegated to the NOPSEMA.

== See also ==
- Deregulation
- Government-owned corporation
- Public administration
- QUANGO
- Regulatory agency
- Statutory corporation
