= Muja Power Station =

Power station in Western Australia

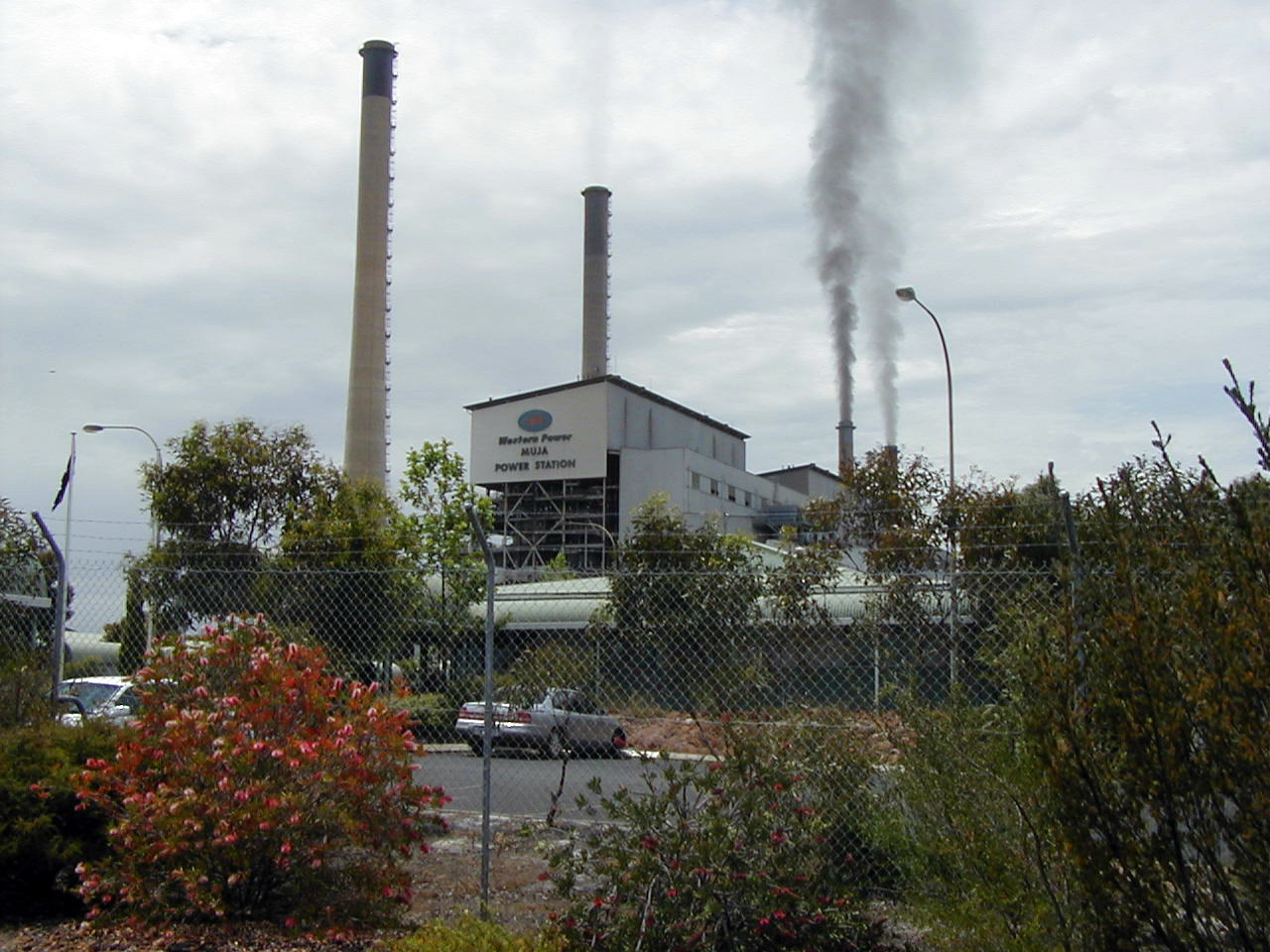
- Country: Australia
- Location: Collie, Western Australia
- Coordinates: 33°26′47″S 116°18′25″E
- Status: Operational
- Commission date: 21 April 1966
- Owner: Synergy

Thermal power station
- Primary fuel: Coal

Power generation
- Units operational: Stage C, Stage D
- Units decommissioned: Stage A, Stage B
- Nameplate capacity: 1094 MW

External links
- Website: www.synergy.net.au
- Commons: Related media on Commons

Muja Power Station is a power station in Muja, 15 kilometres (9.3 mi) southeast of Collie, Western Australia. It has eight steam turbines served by coal-fired boilers that together generate a total capacity of 854 megawatts of electricity. It is the largest power station in the South West Interconnected System, accounting for roughly 15 percent of capacity. The coal is mined in the nearby Collie Sub-basin. In June 2022 the Government of Western Australia announced that the power station would close by 2029.

Construction on the power station by Clough for the State Energy Commission of Western Australia commenced in April 1962. The station was commissioned on 21 April 1966. Currently four of the eight turbines are running (units 5 through to 8). Muja has four 60 megawatts units (stages A and B), two 200 megawatts units (stage C) and two 227 megawatts units (stage D).

According to the National Pollutant Inventory (NPI), Muja Power Station is one of the biggest emitters of air pollution in Australia, including high emissions of beryllium, fluoride and particulate matter. Carbon Monitoring for Action estimates that, in 2009, Muja Power Station emitted 5.75 million tonnes (12.7 billion pounds) of CO_{2} to generate 5.05 terawatt-hours (18.2 petajoules) of electricity.

In household consumer terms, this equates to 1.14 kilograms (2.5 lb) of CO_{2} emitted for each one kilowatt-hour (kWh), or 3.6 megajoules, of electricity produced and fed into the electricity grid. That is, Muja Power Station emits slightly more CO_{2} per kilowatt-hour of electricity produced than nearby Collie Power Station (1.13 kilograms or 2.5 pounds) and much more than Bluewaters Power Station (0.825 kilograms or 1.82 pounds) based on estimates for the same year.

== Refurbishment ==
The four smallest and least efficient units (each of 60 megawatts), stages A and B, were closed in April 2007. In June 2008 it was announced that these older generator units would be recommissioned, due to a statewide natural gas shortage. Verve Energy entered into a joint venture with engineering firm Kempe of Geelong to refurbish four mothballed generating units of Muja. In 2010, a $150 million loan was taken by Kempe subsidiary Inalco with a guarantee from Verve Energy.

== 2012 explosion ==
In 2012 during the attempted recommissioning of stages A and B, an explosion occurred in unit 3 at the refurbished A B area due to corroded piping. A man was burnt, though the station continued to operate (stage C, D) during the incident. Australian Manufacturing Workers Union state secretary Steve McCartney hailed the lack of casualties as a miracle. The joint venture collapsed amid massive cost overruns and an explosion caused by corroded boiler tubes that were not properly inspected before the refurbishment plan was approved. Kempe ran into financial difficulty and has been trying to exit the joint venture for a year. Before Verve's decision on refurbishment, a number of private companies which were offered to buy the power station concluded it would be too risky.

== Stages A-C unit mothballing ==
On 25 June 2013, after spending $250 million on the planned recommissioning of units A and B, Premier Colin Barnett shelved the project. Barnett told Parliament that no further work would be done on the generators for the time being, saying "The government has made a decision with respect to Muja A and B units; three and four continue to operate, units one and two are basically mothballed."

However, the government pressed ahead in September claiming the cost of refurbishment can be recouped over the 15-year expected life of the plant even though it has ballooned to $308 million. In a report by KPMG, to continue the project would cost a further $46 million, and return $54 million in value over ten years, assuming the $290 million spent was written off. In the following months the work was completed quietly and as of 2014 the Muja A and B units are used intermittently, primarily during summer peak times.

In November 2014, part of the wall surrounding water cooling tower of Unit 7 collapsed.

In September 2017, Synergy announced imminent closure of Muja A and B because the necessary repair of cooling towers deemed it commercially unviable. The 2018/19 state budget allocated $48.1 million to work at Muja Stages C and D. This work included $6 million on the refurbishment of the Stage C Turbine and replacement of associated components and $4.2 million on an upgrade to electrical switchboards for Stages C and D.

In August 2019, Synergy announced that Stage C would close by 2024. Stage C Unit 5 was turned off on 29 September 2022 and Stage C Unit 6 was retired in April 2025. The two units in Stage D will remain operational until 2029.
