= Shotts, Western Australia =

Shotts
- Town
- Coordinates: 33.383°S 116.267°E
- Country: Australia
- State: Western Australia
- LGA(s): Shire of Collie
- Location: 214 km (133 mi) SSE of Perth; 12 km (7.5 mi) SSE of Collie
- Established: 1917

Government
  - State electorate(s): Collie-Preston
  - Federal division(s): O'Connor

Area
  - Total: 75.1 km^{2} (29.0 sq mi)
- Elevation: 233 m (764 ft)

Population
  - Total(s): 9 (SAL 2021)
- Postcode: 6225
Localities around Shotts
| Collie | Palmer | Buckingham |
| Collie Burn | Shotts | Buckingham |
| Cardiff | Cardiff | Muja |

Shotts is a rural locality of the Shire of Collie in the South West region of Western Australia, just off the Coalfields Highway between Collie and Darkan.

The town originated as a railway siding named Benelaking on the Collie to Narrogin line in 1911. Later the same year the town was renamed as Shotts in honour of the coal mining town of the same name in North Lanarkshire, Scotland. The Premier Coal Mining Company operated a coal mine near to the siding and in 1913 the Company asked for a town to be established there and were supported by the Collie Road Board. The town was gazetted in 1917.
