= National Offshore Petroleum Safety and Environmental Management Authority =

Statutory Agency overview
- Formed: 1 January 2012
- Preceding Statutory Agency: National Offshore Petroleum Safety Authority
- Jurisdiction: Commonwealth of Australia
- Headquarters: Perth, Western Australia
- Employees: 125 (at 30 June 2020)
- Minister responsible: The Honourable Madeleine King, Minister for Resources
- Statutory Agency executives: Ken Fitzpatrick, Chair; Stuart Smith, CEO
- Parent department: Department of Industry, Science and Resources
- Website: www.nopsema.gov.au

Map
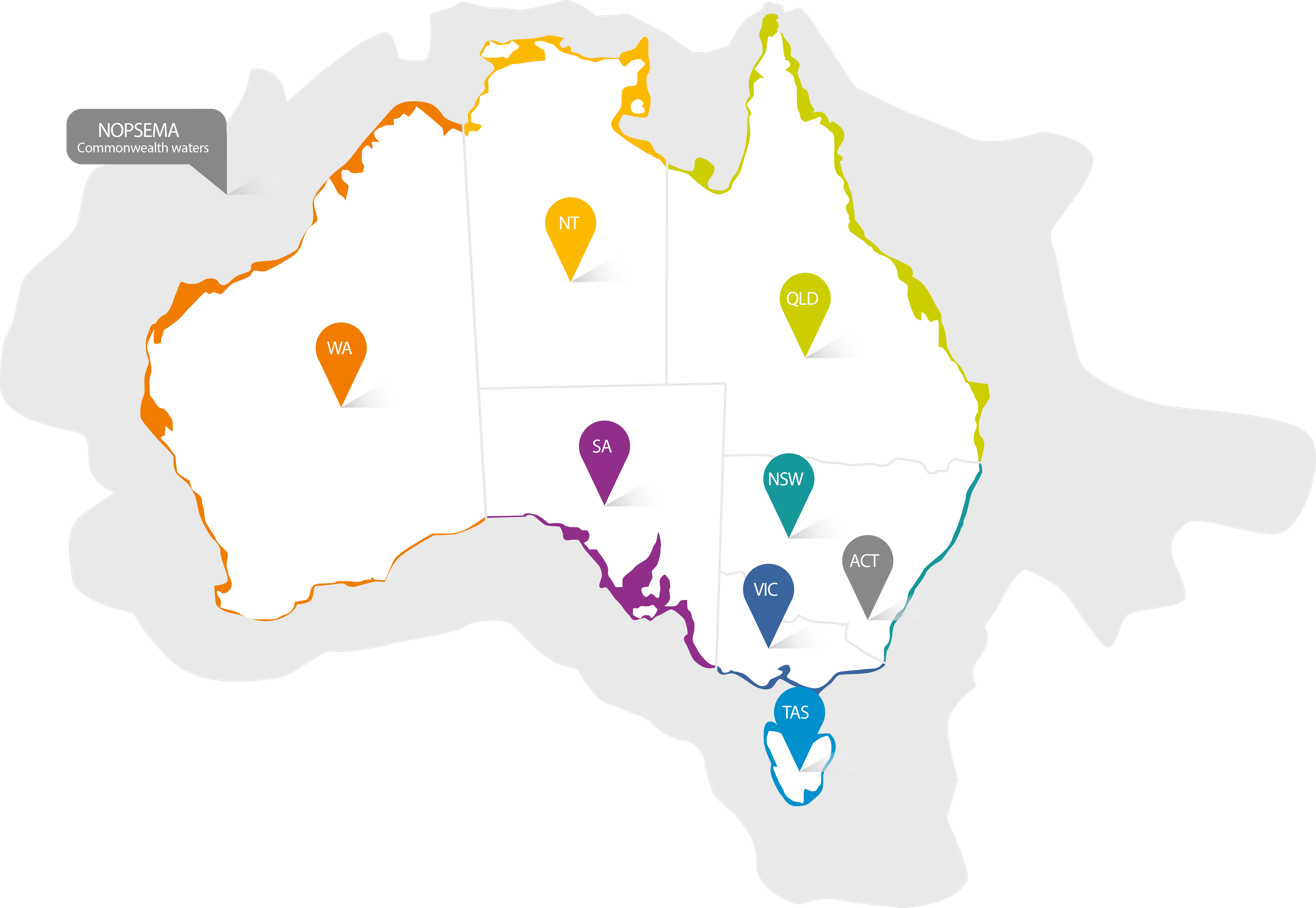
- Map of NOPSEMA jurisdiction in Australian Commonwealth Waters

The National Offshore Petroleum Safety and Environmental Management Authority (NOPSEMA) is the Australian Government offshore energy regulator responsible for the health and safety, well integrity and environmental management aspects of offshore oil and gas operations in Australian Commonwealth waters; and in coastal waters where regulatory powers and functions have been conferred by state governments.

NOPSEMA was established under the Offshore Petroleum and Greenhouse Gas Storage Act 2006 (OPGGS Act). It is a corporate Commonwealth entity under the Public Governance, Performance and Accountability Act 2013, and an independent statutory agency under the Public Service Act 1999. NOPSEMA is part of the Industry, Science, Energy and Resources portfolio.

Under NOPSEMA's corporate structure, its chief executive officer is accountable to the Federal Minister for Resources, Water and Northern Australia. Mr Stuart Smith was appointed chief executive officer of NOPSEMA in September 2014.
