= Bluewaters Power Station =

Coal-fired power station in Western Australia

- Location of Bluewaters Power Station in Western Australia
- Country: Australia
- Location: Collie, Western Australia
- Coordinates: 33°19′50″S 116°13′40″E
- Status: Operational
- Construction began: 2006
- Commission date: 2009
- Owners: Sumitomo Group, Kansai Electric

Thermal power station
- Primary fuel: Bituminous coal

Power generation
- Units operational: 2 x 208 MW
- Nameplate capacity: 416 MW

External links
- Website: www.bluewatersps.com.au

Bluewaters Power Station was the first privately owned, coal-fired power station in Western Australia. It was built by Griffin Energy in 2009 and is the newest coal-fired power station in Australia. The site is 4.5 km (2.8 mi) northeast of Collie.

The plant consists of two 208 megawatts units, running on sub-bituminous coal. The boilers were constructed by IHI while the turbines and generators were supplied by Alstom. EPC contractors were Mitsui and Hitachi Plant Technologies. Construction began in 2006.

Griffin Coal appointed administrators KordaMentha after financial difficulty in 2009, however the power station continued to operate until its purchase by Sumitomo Group and Kansai Electric in 2013. As of 2022, the power station "supplies about 15 per cent of the electricity used in" the South West Interconnected System, Western Australia's main power grid. In December 2022 the Government of Western Australia announced a grant to the receivers and managers of the insolvent coal mine Griffin Coal to enable it to continue supplying the power station over the Western Australian summer.

Community consultation commenced in 2009 for a proposed expansion and the Government of Western Australia approved it in 2010. The proposal was to add two identical units and bring the capacity of the plant to 830 megawatts. In 2018 it remained on hold, with two years remaining until they are required to re-apply for approvals. In 2020, the owners wrote "down the value of" their asset "to zero, wiping out a $1.2 billion investment in the face of an onslaught of renewable energy."
