= Wellington Dam Hydro Power Station =

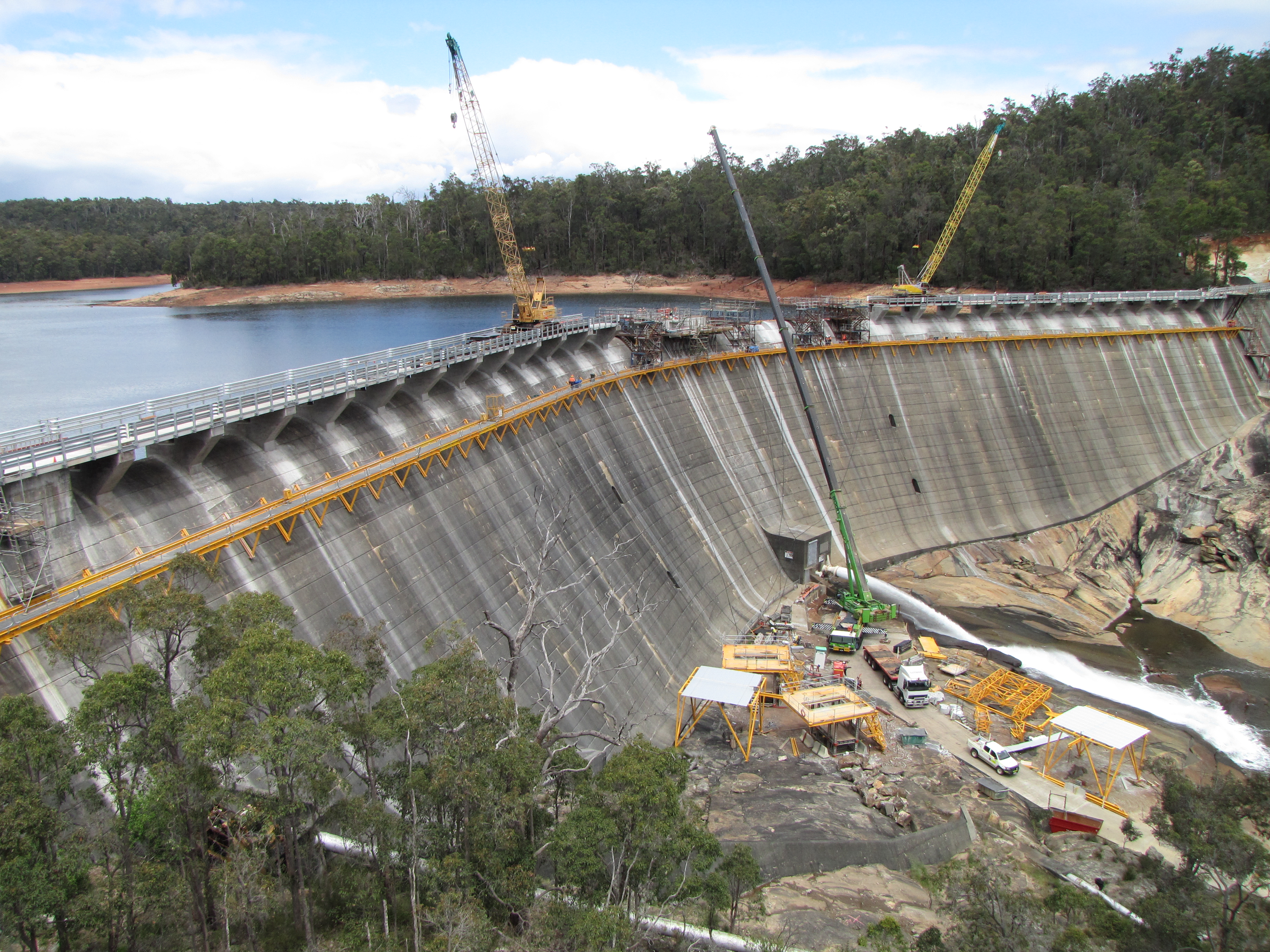
- Wellington Dam during the upgrade in October 2010

- Location within Western Australia
- Interactive map of Wellington Dam Hydro Power Station
- Country: Australia
- Location: Collie, Western Australia
- Coordinates: 33°23′52″S 115°59′27″E

Western Australia Heritage Register
- Designated: 3 February 2009
- Reference no.: 6344

Wellington Dam Hydro Power Station is a hydroelectric power station near Collie, Western Australia. It has one water turbine with a generating capacity of 2 megawatts (2,700 hp) of electricity. The Wellington Dam Hydro Power Station was one of three hydro power stations in Western Australia, with only the Ord River hydro still in operation. The dam was constructed in 1933 and enlarged in 1956, and the power station was built from 1954 to 1956 and commissioned on 3 July 1956. It was placed into care and maintenance in 2007.

Wellington Dam is the largest dam in the South West and the second largest in Western Australia, and is fed by the Collie River.

== History ==
Wellington Dam was built in the early 1900s to supply water to the Great Southern Towns Water Supply system – the pipeline system that supplies water to the Wheatbelt towns in southern Western Australia, as far north as Northam, east to Lake Grace, south to Katanning. The line basically runs parallel to the Goldfields Water Supply Scheme (from Mundaring Weir to Kalgoorlie), and the two lines even join somewhere. It gets its water from the Collie River catchment, which started going salty during the 1960s and 1970s. Much re-afforestation work has been happening since the 1980s to slow down the trend of rising salinity. A new dam on nearby Harris River was commissioned in the 1990s to supply fresh water until such time as Wellington Dam is fresh again sometime in the future.

Wellington Dam was originally built in 1935 with a storage capacity of 35 gigalitres (1.2 billion cubic feet) as a source of irrigation on the coastal plains. The dam was raised over the years and reached its current capacity is 185 gigalitres (6.5 billion cubic feet) in 1960.

In December 2009 the Water Corporation started a $41 million project to strengthen the dam wall.

== Mural ==
In 2021, an 8,000 square metre mural was painted on the dam wall. The mural, titled "Reflections", was done by artist Guido van Helten. It is the largest mural painted on a dam in the world. In March 2025, Seymour Whyte commenced work on a new bridge to the mural. It opened in October 2026.
