= Collie, Western Australia =

Collie
- Town
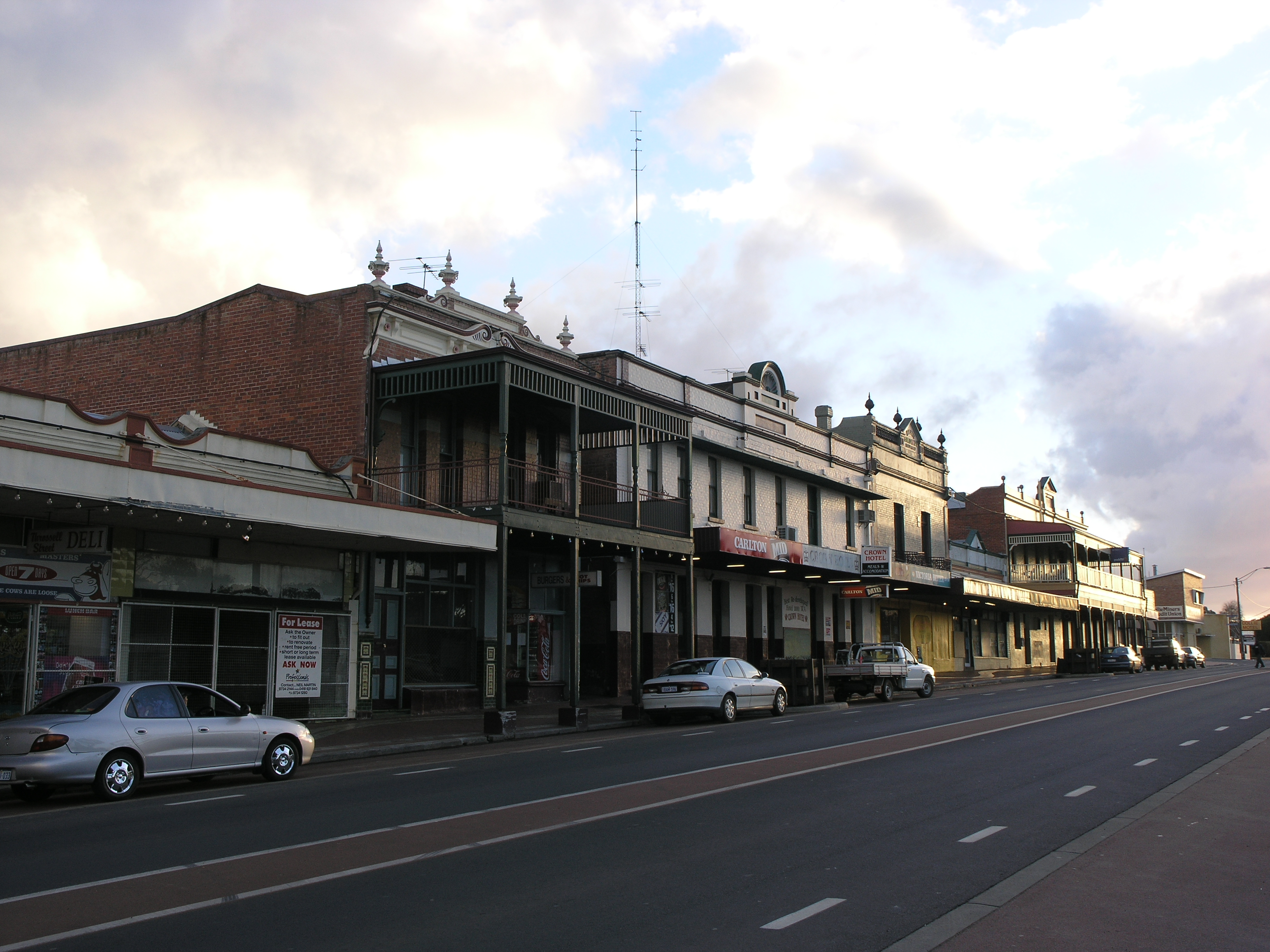
- Main street of Collie

- Interactive map of Collie
- Coordinates: 33.363°S 116.156°E
- Country: Australia
- State: Western Australia
- LGA: Shire of Collie
- Location: 213 km (132 mi) S of Perth; 59 km (37 mi) E of Bunbury
- Established: 1897

Government
  - State electorate: Collie-Preston
  - Federal division: O'Connor

Area
  - Total: 53.4 km^{2} (20.6 sq mi)
- Elevation: 204 m (669 ft)

Population
  - Total: 7,184 (UCL 2021)
- Postcode: 6225
- Mean max temp: 23.2 °C (73.8 °F)
- Mean min temp: 8.5 °C (47.3 °F)
- Annual rainfall: 703.6 mm (27.70 in)
Localities around Collie
Allanson	Harris River	Palmer
Mungalup	Collie	Shotts
Mungalup	Preston Settlement	Collie Burn

Collie is a town in the South West region of Western Australia, 213 kilometres (132 mi) south of the state capital, Perth, and 59 kilometres (37 mi) inland from the regional city and port of Bunbury. It is near the junction of the Collie and Harris Rivers, in the middle of dense jarrah forest and the only coalfields in Western Australia. At the 2021 census, Collie had a population of 7,599.

Collie is mainly known as a coal-producing centre, but also offers industrial, agricultural and aquaculture tourism industries. Muja Power Station is located 15 kilometres (9 mi) south-east, Collie Power Station is 5 kilometres (3 mi) east, and Bluewaters Power Station is 4 kilometres (2.5 mi) northeast of the town. To its west is the Wellington Dam, a popular location for fishing, swimming and boating.

== History ==
The town is named after the river on which it is situated. James Stirling named the Collie River, which in turn is named after Alexander Collie. He and William Preston were the first Europeans to explore the area, in 1829.

It has been reported that coal was discovered in the area by a shepherd named George Marsh in the early 1880s. The townsite was surveyed and gazetted in 1897. Coal production began in 1898 when the Brunswick Junction to Narrogin railway line was extended to Collie.

Collie was once referred to as a "dirty mining town", but on 8 April 2006 it won the Australian Tidy Towns Competition from finalists from six states and the Northern Territory. Collie was named the top Tidy Town because of the commitment of the community to recycling, waste management, beautification and community projects.

== Population ==
According to the 2021 census, there were 7,599 people in Collie.

- Aboriginal and Torres Strait Islander people made up 4.8% of the population.
- 81.0% of people were born in Australia. The next most common countries of birth were England 3.9% and New Zealand 2.1%.
- 89.0% of people spoke only English at home.
- The most common responses for religion were No Religion 51.5%, Catholic 16.3% and Anglican 12.5%.

== Industry and economy ==
Collie has a significant role in the provision of electricity for Western Australia. The state's two coal mines are in the town, and there are the three coal-fired power stations (Muja due to close by 2029, Collie due to close by 2027, and Bluewaters written off in 2020 by owners as zero valued). The Government of Western Australia will soon commission a new base load power station, for which a number of Collie base proposals have been made including nuclear.

In 2014 Western Collieries, the Premier Coal mining operation, reported a production capacity of 5 million tonnes (11 billion pounds) of coal per year for 30 years. The Griffin Coal mine is owned by the Indian company Lanco Infratech.

== Education ==
Collie has five primary schools (Allanson Primary School, Fairview Primary School, Amaroo Primary School, Saint Brigid's Catholic College and Wilson Park Primary School) and one high school, Collie Senior High School.

== Tourism and facilities ==
Tourist attractions at Collie include the Steam Locomotive Museum, Collie Art Gallery, Minninup Pool and Wellington Dam. Parks include Soldier's Memorial Park and natural features include the Collie River. Stockton Lake, Lake Kepwari, Harris River Dam and Wellington Dam are man-made reservoirs and lakes available for leisure and recreation. Sporting facilities include the Roche Park Recreation Centre, Collie Hockey Grounds and the Collie Eagles Oval.

Collie also hosts the Collie Motorplex, one of Western Australia's few permanent motorsport venues outside the Perth metropolitan area.

The Coalfields Museum and Historical Research Centre provides a glimpse of the history and development of the mining town of Collie.

== Geography ==
=== Climate ===
Collie experiences a Mediterranean climate with warm, dry summers and cool, wet winters (Köppen climate classification Csb). The town was lashed with unseasonal storms on 12 December 2012 resulting in some flooding in the town. The town received 126 millimetres (5 in) of rain in a 12-hour period; several houses were evacuated.

Climate data for Collie East (2002–2024 averages and extremes)
Month	Jan	Feb	Mar	Apr	May	Jun	Jul	Aug	Sep	Oct	Nov	Dec	Year
Record high °C (°F)	42.3 (108.1)	42.4 (108.3)	40.0 (104.0)	36.4 (97.5)	28.7 (83.7)	24.5 (76.1)	22.4 (72.3)	27.2 (81.0)	30.6 (87.1)	33.7 (92.7)	38.4 (101.1)	40.7 (105.3)	42.4 (108.3)
Mean daily maximum °C (°F)	31.1 (88.0)	30.8 (87.4)	28.2 (82.8)	23.9 (75.0)	20.2 (68.4)	17.3 (63.1)	16.4 (61.5)	17.2 (63.0)	18.7 (65.7)	21.8 (71.2)	25.5 (77.9)	29.0 (84.2)	23.3 (73.9)
Mean daily minimum °C (°F)	13.5 (56.3)	14.0 (57.2)	12.3 (54.1)	8.9 (48.0)	6.1 (43.0)	4.5 (40.1)	4.3 (39.7)	4.8 (40.6)	5.7 (42.3)	7.5 (45.5)	9.9 (49.8)	11.7 (53.1)	8.6 (47.5)
Record low °C (°F)	2.8 (37.0)	4.2 (39.6)	1.0 (33.8)	0.4 (32.7)	−3.1 (26.4)	−6.0 (21.2)	−4.0 (24.8)	−2.7 (27.1)	−2.7 (27.1)	−0.7 (30.7)	−0.4 (31.3)	2.6 (36.7)	−6.0 (21.2)
Average precipitation mm (inches)	15.9 (0.63)	11.1 (0.44)	18.4 (0.72)	39.7 (1.56)	92.1 (3.63)	97.7 (3.85)	134.0 (5.28)	116.0 (4.57)	86.1 (3.39)	39.7 (1.56)	24.3 (0.96)	17.5 (0.69)	686.0 (27.01)
Average rainy days (≥ 0.2mm)	2.8	3.5	4.8	8.9	12.9	15.0	20.2	18.6	15.5	11.3	6.9	4.9	125.3

== Sport ==
Collie Speedway is a motorcycle speedway venue on the eastern edge of Collie, on Clifford Street. The venue, which opened in 1971 has hosted important motorcycle speedway events, including qualifying rounds of the Speedway World Championship (starting in 1992) and the final of the Western Australian Individual Speedway Championship on two occasions.

== Gallery ==
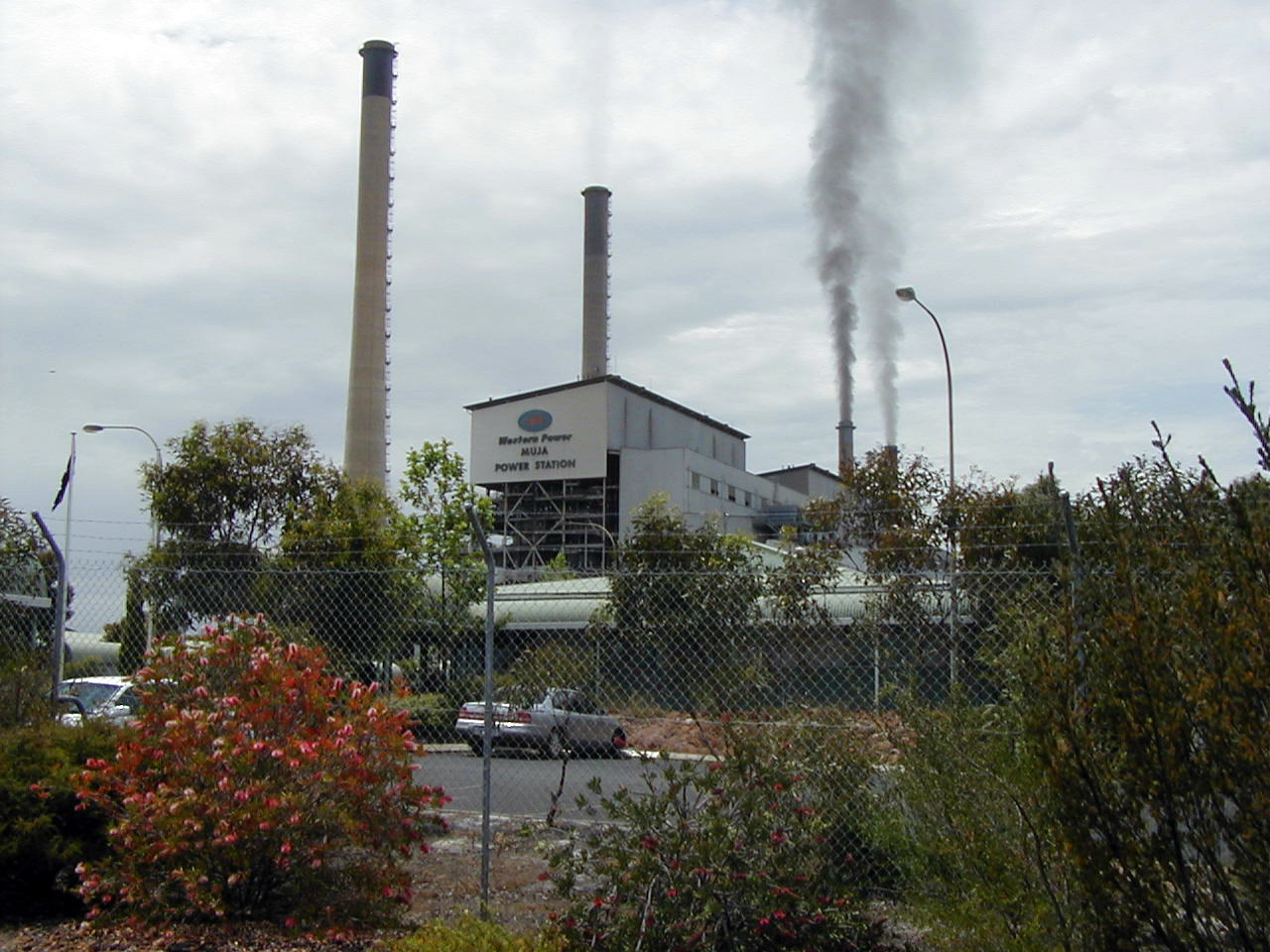
Muja Power Station, situated 15 kilometres (9.3 mi) south-east of Collie beyond Cardiff

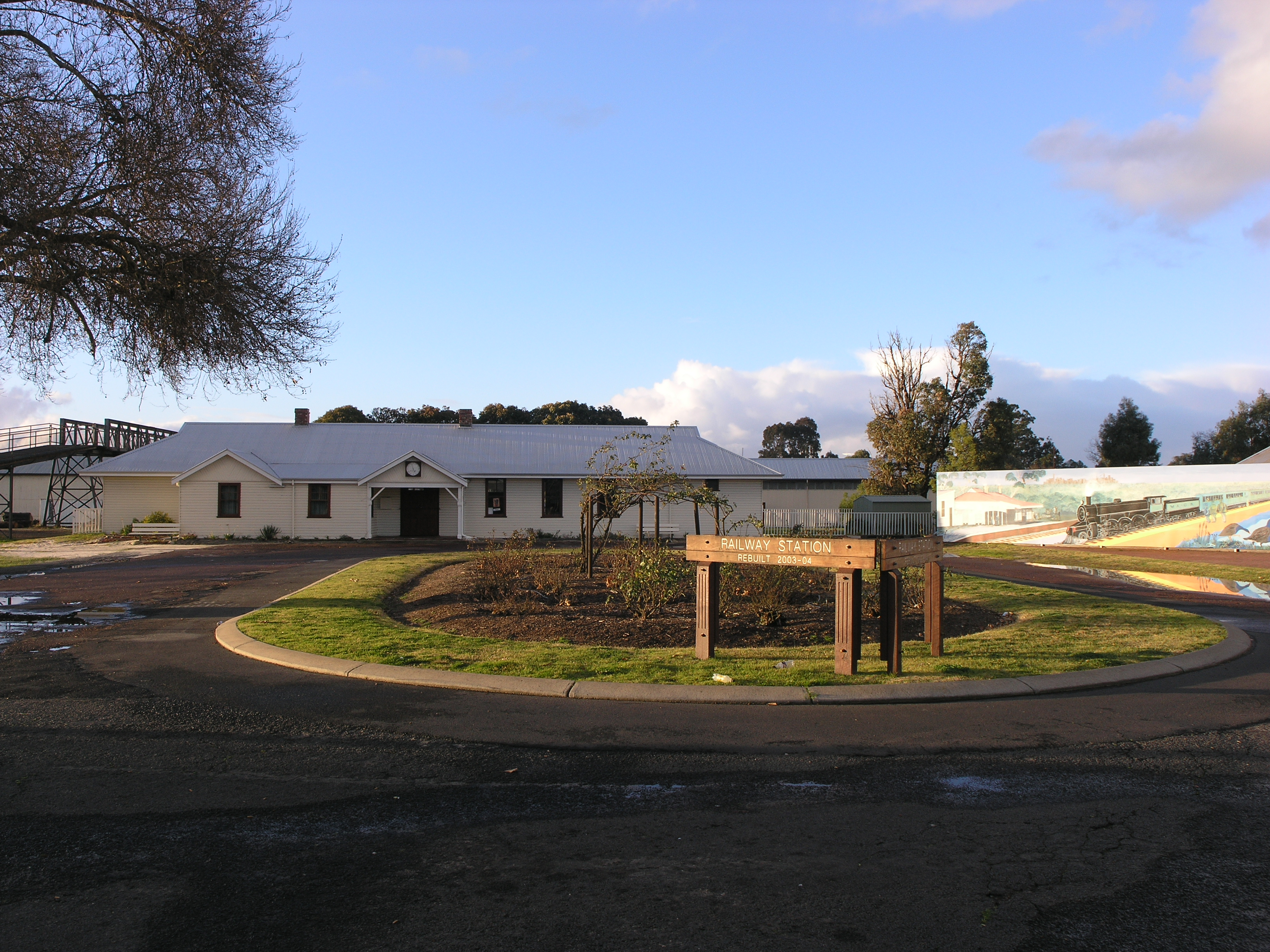
Collie railway station

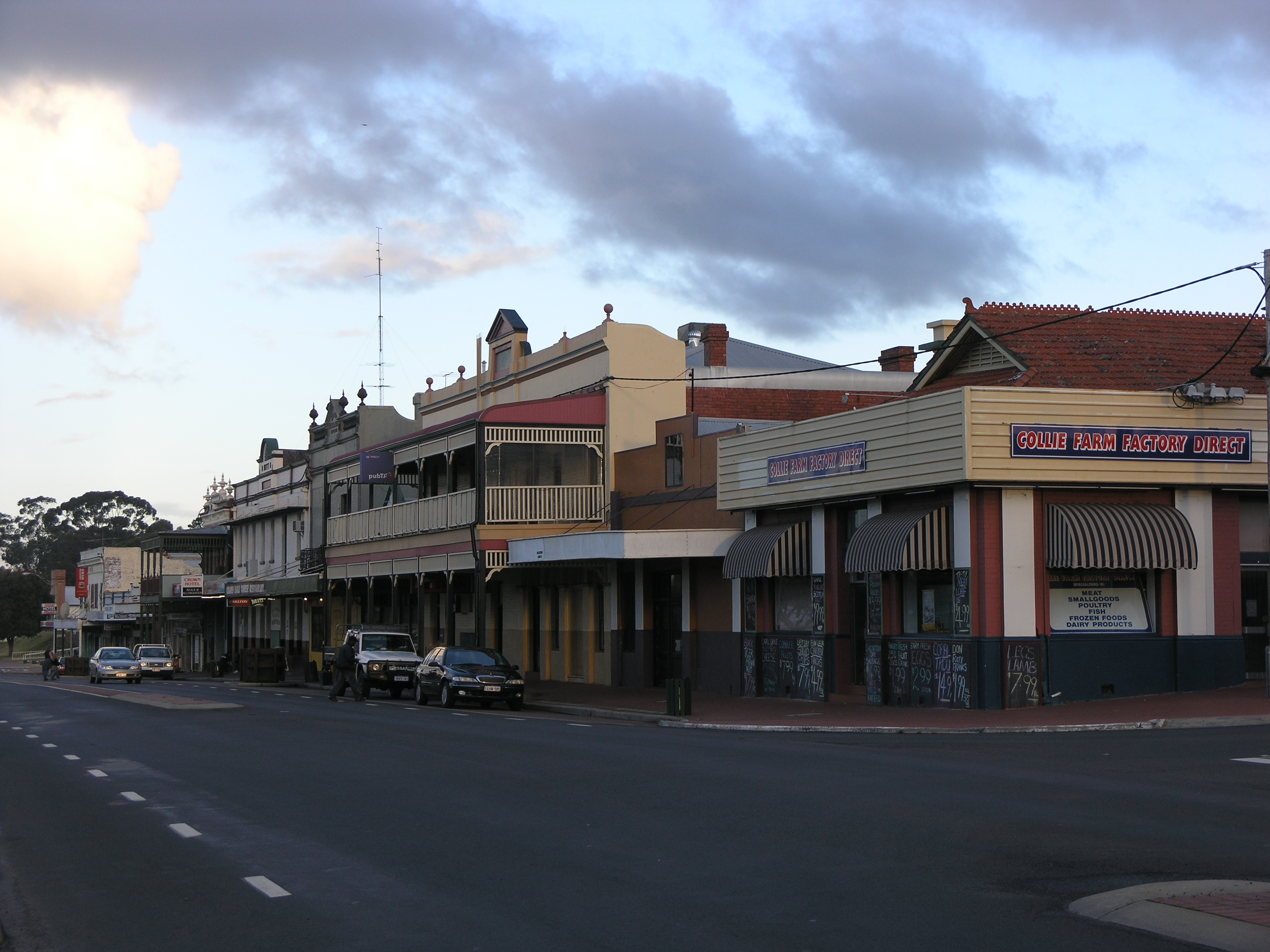
The main street of Collie
