= Wiilman =

Indigenous people in Western Australia

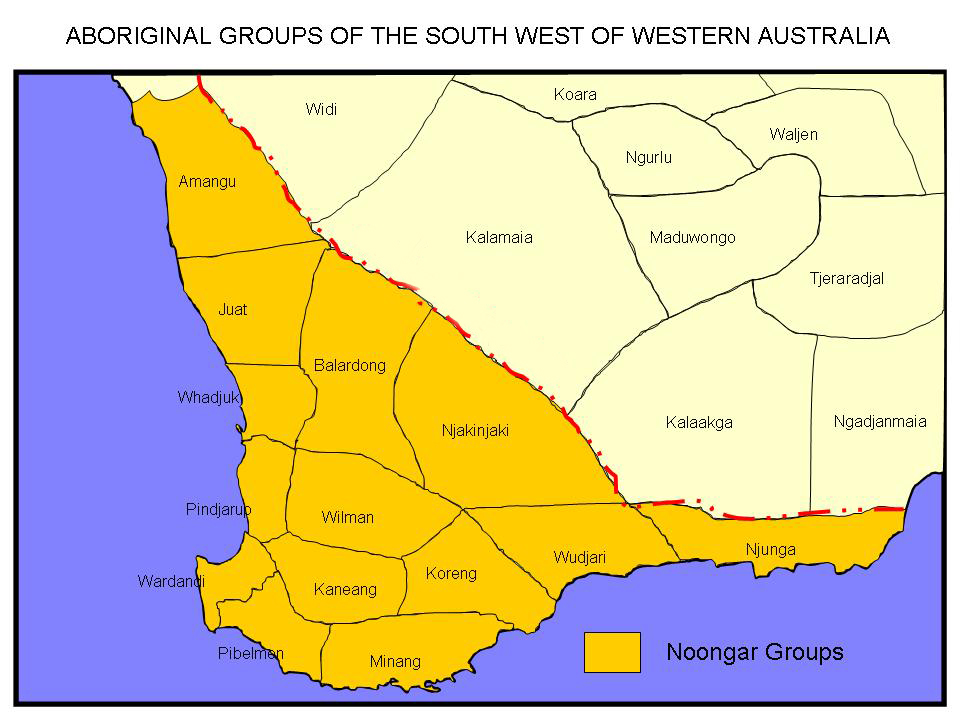
Noongar language groups

The Wiilman people are an Aboriginal Australian people of the Noongar group, from the Wheatbelt, Great Southern and South West regions of Western Australia. Variant spellings of the name include Wilman, Wirlomin, Wilmen and Wheelman. Wiilman is the endonym.

== Language ==
Their original language, also known as Wiilman, is extinct and poorly documented, but is generally believed to have been part of the Nyungar subgroup.

== Country ==
The Wiilman originally occupied an estimated 6,700 square miles (17,000 km^{2}) of territory, taking in the future sites of Collie, Boddington, Pingelly, Wickepin, Narrogin, Williams, Lake Grace, Wagin, and Katanning.

The northern boundary of the Wiilmen is from around Wuraming, through Gnowing (north of Wandering) and Dattening to Pingelly. The eastern boundary included Wickepin, Dudinin and Lake Grace. In the south, the boundary of Wiilmen country included Nyabing (originally Nampup), Katanning, Woodanilling and Duranillin.

== Mythology ==
Ethel Hassell wrote extensively on the "Wheelman tribe", her term for the Wiilman, but her manuscript was neglected until the American anthropologist Daniel Sutherland Davidson came across it while researching Australian archives in 1930. Davidson arranged for Hassell's work to be published in instalments in the journal Folklore (1934-1935).

According to Norman Tindale, much of the material ascribed to the Wiilman was gathered from their southern neighbours, the Koreng and actually reflects Koreng culture.

== Alternative names ==
The neighbouring Koreng people referred to the Wiilman by the exonym Jaburu, meaning "northerners/north-westerners".

Some early colonial sources referred to them as "the Williams tribe".

Abbreviated forms of Wiilman have sometimes been used, including Weal, Weel.

== Sources ==
- "AIATSIS map of Indigenous Australia". AIATSIS.
- Bates, Daisy (1914). "Social Organization of some Western Australian Tribes". Australian Association for the Advancement of Science. 14: 387–400.
- "Boodjar Nyungar Placenames in the South-West of Western Australia: Wiilman Tribal Region". University of Western Australia. n.d.
- Curr, Edward Micklethwaite (1886). Curr, Edward Micklethwaite (ed.). The Australian race: its origin, languages, customs, place of landing in Australia and the routes by which it spread itself over the continent (PDF). Vol. 1. Melbourne: J. Ferres.
- Davidson, D. S.; McCarthy, Frederick D. (1957). "The Distribution and Chronology of Some Important Types of Stone Implements inWestern Australia". Anthropos. 52 (3/4): 387–400. JSTOR 40454078.
- Hassell, Edith (September 1934a). Davidson, D. S. (ed.). "Myths and Folktales of the Wheelman Tribe of South-Western Australia". Folklore. 45 (3): 232–248. doi:10.1080/0015587X.1934.9718560. JSTOR 1256168.
- Hassell, Edith (December 1934b). Davidson, D. S. (ed.). "Myths and Folktales of the Wheelman Tribe of South-Western Australia. 11". Folklore. 45 (4): 317–341. doi:10.1080/0015587X.1934.9718572. JSTOR 1257857.
- Hassell, Edith (June 1935a). Davidson, D. S. (ed.). "Myths and Folk-Tales of the Wheelman Tribe of South-Western Australia. III". Folklore. 46 (2): 122–147. doi:10.1080/0015587X.1935.9718592. JSTOR 1257649.
- Hassell, Edith (September 1935b). Davidson, D. S. (ed.). "Myths and Folk-Tales of the Wheelman Tribe of South-Western Australia: IV". Folklore. 46 (3): 268–281. doi:10.1080/0015587X.1935.9718605. JSTOR 1257385.
- Nind, Scott (1831). "Description of the Natives of King George's Sound (Swan River Colony) and Adjoining Country". Journal of the Royal Geographical Society of London. 1: 21–51. doi:10.2307/1797657. JSTOR 1797657.
- Thieberger, Nicholas (1993). Handbook of Western Australian Aboriginal Languages South of the Kimberley Region. Pacific Linguistics. ISBN 978-0-858-83418-7.
- "Tindale Tribal Boundaries" (PDF). Department of Aboriginal Affairs, Western Australia. September 2016. Archived from the original (PDF) on 8 March 2016.
- Tindale, Norman Barnett (1974). "Wiilman (WA)". Aboriginal Tribes of Australia: Their Terrain, Environmental Controls, Distribution, Limits, and Proper Names. Australian National University. Archived from the original on 20 March 2020.
