= List of State Register of Heritage Places in the Shire of Donnybrook-Balingup =

List of heritage sites in Western Australia

The State Register of Heritage Places is maintained by the Heritage Council of Western Australia. As of 2026, 114 places are heritage-listed in the Shire of Donnybrook-Balingup, of which twelve are on the State Register of Heritage Places.

== List ==
The Western Australian State Register of Heritage Places, as of 2026, lists the following twelve state registered places within the Shire of Donnybrook-Balingup:

Place name	Place #	Street number	Street name	Suburb or town	Co-ordinates	Notes & former names	Photo
Ferndale	702	626	Balingup-Nannup Road	Southampton	33.812758°S 115.942545°E		
Brooklands	705	113	Airstrip Road	Balingup	33.783435°S 115.952704°E	Brooklands Homestead, Padbury's Brook	
Golden Valley	707		Old Padbury Road	Balingup	33.799068°S 115.993143°E		
Southampton homestead	710		Southampton Road	Balingup	33.888°S 115.972°E		
Brookhampton Hall	713	460	Brookhampton Road	Brookhampton	33.606837°S 115.900934°E		
All Saints' Anglican Church	723	126-128	South Western Highway	Donnybrook	33.578055°S 115.827546°E		
Donnybrook Post Office	727	54	South Western Highway	Donnybrook	33.572053°S 115.824112°E		
Blackwood Inn	734	21064	South Western Highway	Mullalyup	33.74777°S 115.949868°E	Old Mullalyup Inn and Barns	
Brookhampton War Memorial	3702	460	Brookhampton Road	Brookhampton	33.607012°S 115.901315°E		
Lewana	5006	1435	Balingup-Nannup Road	Southampton	33.869387°S 115.904368°E	Lewana Park	
Railway Precinct, Donnybrook	5012		South Western Highway	Donnybrook	33.573385°S 115.823629°E	Donnybrook Railway Precinct	
A.T. Brine's Donnybrook Sandstone Quarries (former)	23664	Lot 3124	Grist Road	Donnybrook	33.544893°S 115.832544°E	No.3 Quarry, Donnybrook Sandstone Quarry No.3	
