= Kirup, Western Australia =

Kirup
- Town
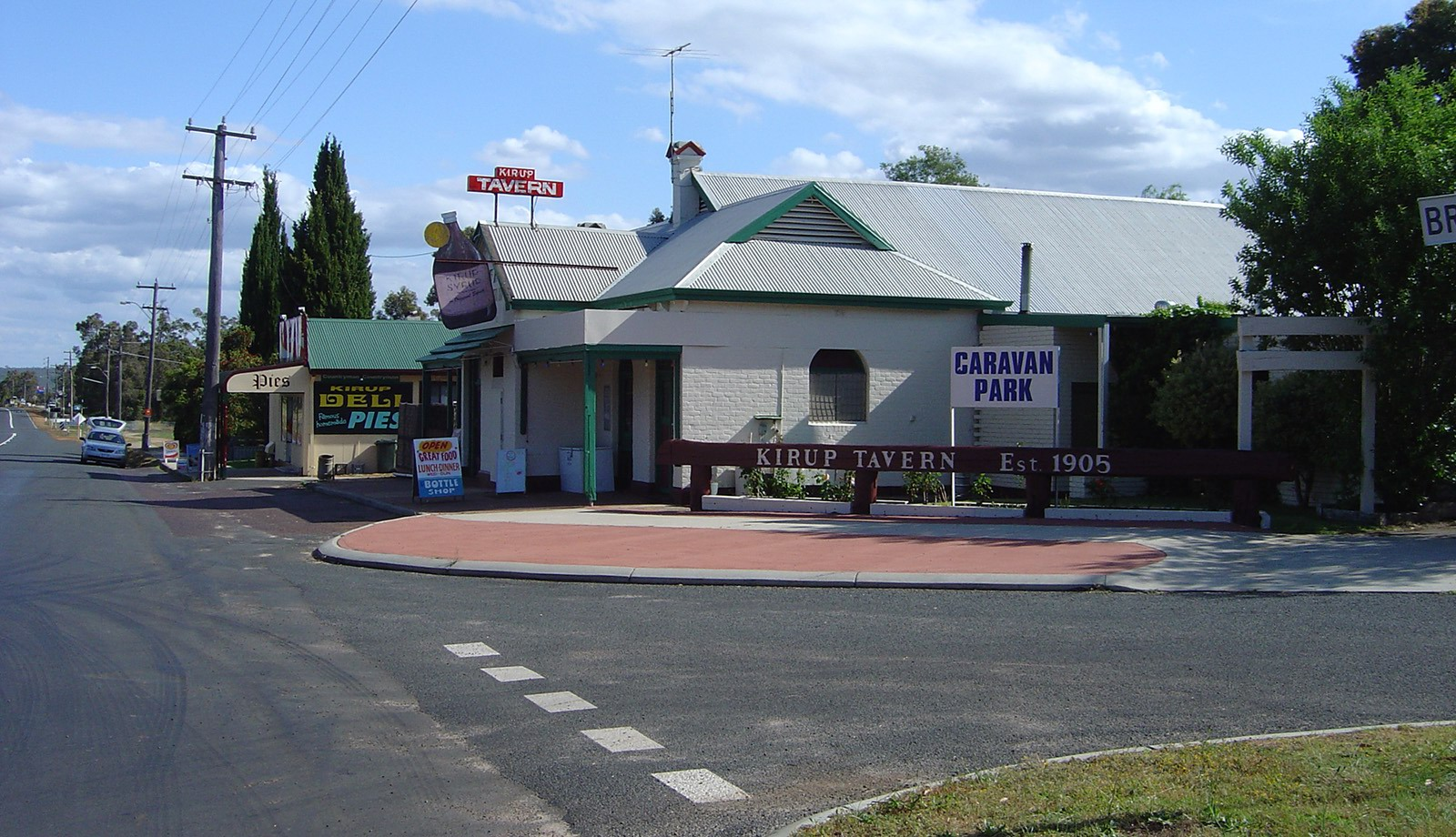
- Kirup Tavern and Deli

- Coordinates: 33.708°S 115.894°E
- Country: Australia
- State: Western Australia
- LGA(s): Shire of Donnybrook-Balingup
- Location: 228 km (142 mi) south west of Perth; 13 km (8.1 mi) north of Balingup
- Established: 1901

Government
  - State electorate(s): Collie-Preston
  - Federal division(s): Forrest

Area
  - Total: 76.9 km^{2} (29.7 sq mi)
- Elevation: 194 m (636 ft)

Population
  - Total(s): 156 (SAL 2021)
- Postcode: 6251
Localities around Kirup
Newlands	Brookhampton	Thomson Brook
Brazier	Kirup	Grimwade
Brazier	Mullalyup	Mullalyup

Kirup, originally named Upper Capel, then Kirupp, is situated between Donnybrook and Balingup on the South Western Highway, 228 kilometres (142 mi) south of Perth, Western Australia in the upper reaches of the Capel River valley.

Kirup is one of the three main town sites within the Shire of Donnybrook-Balingup.

== History ==
Kirup and the Shire of Donnybrook–Balingup are located on the traditional land of the Wardandi people of the Noongar nation.

European settlement at Upper Capel (south-east of the current locality of Upper Capel) began in the 1870s with Joseph Cookworthy's Rockfield cattle station, managed by John Moore. At that time all supplies were transported from Bunbury by bullock wagon, or horseback. By 1890 Upper Capel could field a cricket team, which played teams from Ferguson, Upper Preston and Greenbushes.

In 1897 gold was discovered 12 miles to the north at Donnybrook, and by 1898 prospecting had extended to the Upper Capel, where three prospecting areas were staked.

The Upper Capel railway siding was constructed in late 1897 as part of the new Donnybrook to Bridgetown railway line. Later extended and known as the Northcliffe railway line, passenger services ceased in the late 20th century. The new line allowed George Baxter to develop a 15,000-acre (6,100 ha) timber concession. Baxter established Preston Jarrah Sawmills, with a 5-mile (8.0 km) long woodline spur into his concession from Upper Capel siding. The mill produced timber for export through Bunbury, sleepers for the Menzies-Leonora railway, the New Zealand government and for the South African and New South Wales railways, and timber for new harbour works at Fremantle.

In 1901 a townsite was surveyed and gazetted, adjacent to the Upper Capel railway station. The Upper Capel Roads Board (headquartered at Balingup) proposed that the town be called "Keerup", the Noongar name for the area, thought to mean "place of the summer flies". (Note: The suffix -up, as used in Kirup, is commonly found in place names in south-western Western Australia and is of Noongar origin, meaning "place of".)

Following World War I Kirup and East Kirup (now called Grimwade) were part of the Soldier Settlement Scheme, in which larger historical landholdings such as the Ravenscliffe Estate (2,311 acres), Brazier Estate (1,350 acres) and Ryall Estate (900 acres) were repurchased by the government and subdivided for settlement by returned servicemen.

== Economy ==
Kirup's major industries are organic horticulture, apple, pear and cherry orcharding, fruit packing and cattle breeding. It is famed for Kirup Syrup, a red wine originally made by Alberto Vinci at his local vineyard.

== Notable residents ==
- Lieutenant Colonel Noel Brazier (1866–1947), second owner of Rockfield, founder and Commanding Officer of the 10th Light Horse Regiment
