= Newlands, Western Australia =

Locality in the Shire of Donnybrook–Balingup, Western Australia

Newlands
- Town
- Interactive map of Newlands
- Coordinates: 33.67°S 115.88°E
- Country: Australia
- State: Western Australia
- LGA: Shire of Donnybrook–Balingup
- Location: 190 km (120 mi) from Perth; 45 km (28 mi) from Bunbury; 12 km (7.5 mi) from Donnybrook
- Established: 1907

Government
  - State electorate: Collie-Preston
  - Federal division: Forrest

Area
  - Total: 23.4 km^{2} (9.0 sq mi)

Population
  - Total: 112 (SAL 2021)
- Postcode: 6251
Localities around Newlands
Upper Capel	Upper Capel	Brookhampton
Upper Capel	Newlands	Brookhampton
Brazier	Brazier	Kirup

Newlands is a rural town and locality of the Shire of Donnybrook–Balingup in the South West region of Western Australia. The South Western Highway runs through the eastern part of the locality from north to south.

Newlands started out as a siding on the Donnybrook to Bridgetown section of the Northcliffe branch railway and was first mentioned in 1899. The Imperial Jarrah Company built a public hall at Newlands in 1901, which was also used as a school at the time. At the request of the local residents, the Western Australian Government declared a townsite at Newlands, which was gazetted in 1907.

Newlands and the Shire of Donnybrook–Balingup are located on the traditional land of the Wardandi people of the Noongar nation.
