= Brazier, Western Australia =

Locality in the Shire of Donnybrook–Balingup, Western Australia

Brazier
- other
- Coordinates: 33.77°S 115.83°E
- Country: Australia
- State: Western Australia
- LGA: Shire of Donnybrook–Balingup
- Location: 197 km (122 mi) from Perth; 49 km (30 mi) from Bunbury; 17 km (11 mi) from Donnybrook

Government
  - State electorate: Collie-Preston
  - Federal division: Forrest

Area
  - Total: 79 km^{2} (31 sq mi)

Population
  - Total: 40 (SAL 2021)
- Postcode: 6251
Localities around Brazier
Yoganup	Upper Capel	Newlands
Yoganup	Brazier	Kirup
Cundinup	Cundinup	Mullalyup

Brazier is a rural locality of the Shire of Donnybrook–Balingup in the South West region of Western Australia.

Brazier and the Shire of Donnybrook–Balingup are located on the traditional land of the Wardandi people of the Noongar nation.
