= Thomson Brook, Western Australia =

Locality in the Shire of Donnybrook–Balingup, Western Australia

Thomson Brook
- other
- Coordinates: 33.62°S 115.97°E
- Country: Australia
- State: Western Australia
- LGA: Shire of Donnybrook–Balingup
- Location: 186 km (116 mi) from Perth; 46 km (29 mi) from Bunbury; 14 km (8.7 mi) from Donnybrook

Government
  - State electorate: Collie-Preston
  - Federal division: Forrest

Area
  - Total: 86.5 km^{2} (33.4 sq mi)

Population
  - Total: 89 (SAL 2021)
- Postcode: 6239
Localities around Thomson Brook
Charley Creek	Lowden	Yabberup
Brookhampton	Thomson Brook	Noggerup
Brookhampton	Kirup	Grimwade

Thomson Brook is a rural locality of the Shire of Donnybrook–Balingup in the South West region of Western Australia.

Thomson Brook and the Shire of Donnybrook–Balingup are located on the traditional land of the Wardandi people of the Noongar nation.

The locality is home to three heritage listed sites: St Thomas' Anglican church, the Woodperry homestead, and a group of nine eucalyptus marri. St Thomas' Anglican church was privately built for the Thompson family in 1908, a rarity in Western Australia, and consecrated by the Anglican Bishop of Bunbury the following year, on 17 March 1909. Despite its private origins, it has since been widely used by the local community. The nine marri or red gum trees were planted in 1986 from seeds and, unusually, continue to have red flowers despite the fact that these usually revert to white flowers. Woodperry is a mud brick house, a rarity in the district, dating back to 1901. At the time of its assessment, it was in very poor condition.
