= Lowden, Western Australia =

Locality in the Shire of Donnybrook–Balingup, Western Australia

Lowden
- other
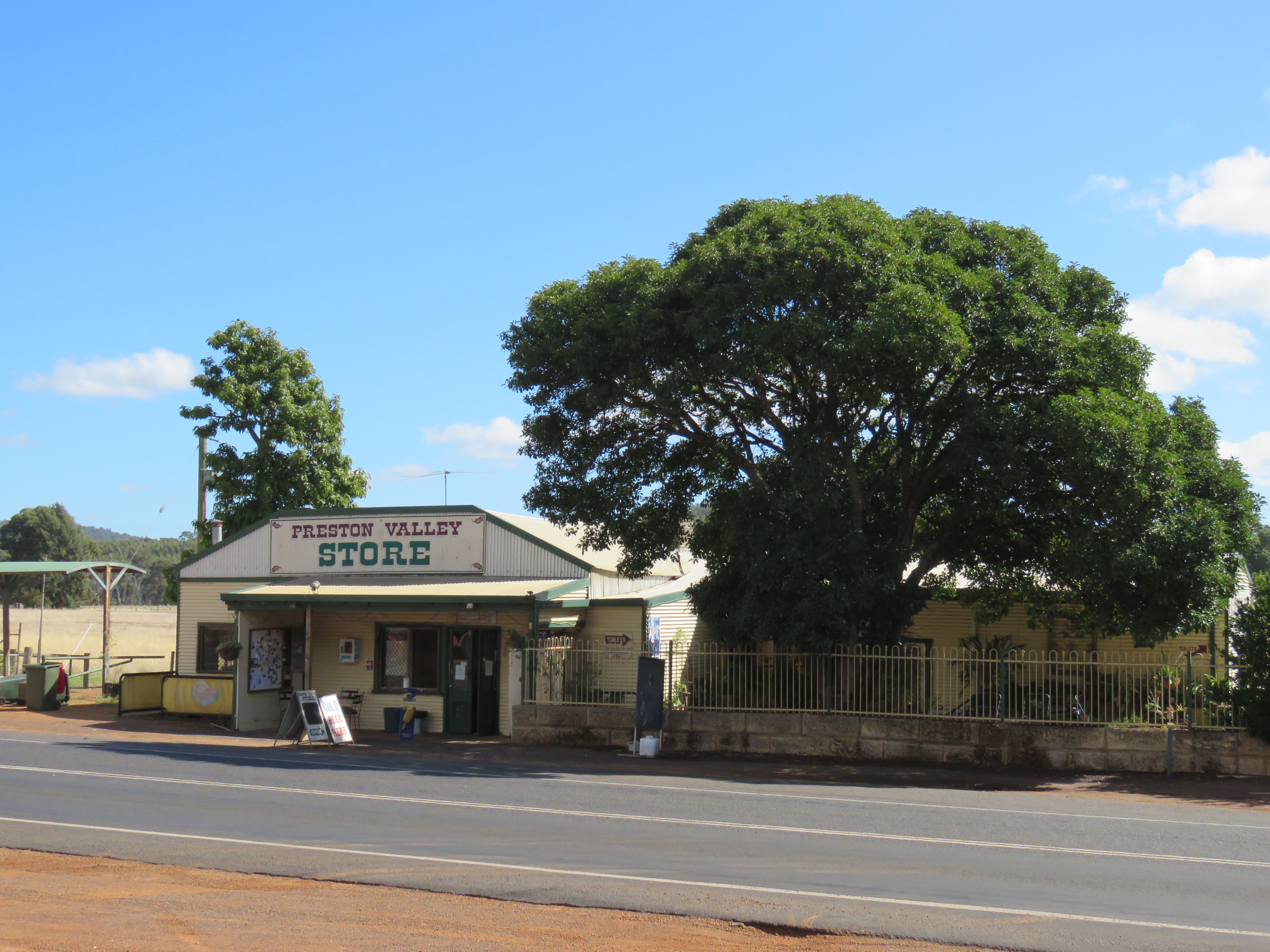
- The Preston Valley Store at Lowden in April 2022
- Coordinates: 33.53°S 115.98°E
- Country: Australia
- State: Western Australia
- LGA: Shire of Donnybrook–Balingup
- Location: 176 km (109 mi) from Perth; 39 km (24 mi) from Bunbury; 14 km (8.7 mi) from Donnybrook

Government
  - State electorate: Collie-Preston
  - Federal division: Forrest

Area
  - Total: 44.7 km^{2} (17.3 sq mi)

Population
  - Total: 165 (SAL 2021)
- Postcode: 6240
Localities around Lowden
Wellington Forest	Wellington Forest	Yabberup
Queenwood	Lowden	Yabberup
Charley Creek	Thomson Brook	Thomson Brook

Lowden is a rural locality of the Shire of Donnybrook–Balingup in the South West region of Western Australia. The Preston River and the Donnybrook–Boyup Brook Road run through the centre of the locality from east to west.

Lowden and the Shire of Donnybrook–Balingup are located on the traditional land of the Wardandi people of the Noongar nation.

The locality is home to four heritage listed sites: the Preston Valley Store, the Diverbrook Homestead, the Woodlands Homestead and Sunnyvale. The Sunnyvale homestead and farm were established at Lowden in the early 1880s, while the Woodlands Homestead dates back to 1892.

Lowden was once a siding on the Donnybrook–Katanning railway, of which remnants can still be seen south of the Donnybrook–Boyup Brook Road at the Preston Valley Store. The railway line ceased operation in 1982. The Lowden siding, which opened in 1908, was closed in 1985.

Lowden is home to "Frogs Hollow", a collection of frog statues, similar to "Gnomesville", which lies 10 kilometres (6.2 mi) further north on Ferguson Road.
