= Beelerup, Western Australia =

Locality in the Shire of Donnybrook–Balingup, Western Australia

Beelerup
- other
- Coordinates: 33.58°S 115.85°E
- Country: Australia
- State: Western Australia
- LGA: Shire of Donnybrook–Balingup
- Location: 180 km (110 mi) from Perth; 34 km (21 mi) from Bunbury; 2 km (1.2 mi) from Donnybrook

Government
  - State electorate: Collie-Preston
  - Federal division: Forrest

Area
  - Total: 27 km^{2} (10 sq mi)

Population
  - Total: 126 (SAL 2021)
- Postcode: 6239
Localities around Beelerup
| Crooked Brook | Wellington Forest | Crooked Brook |
| Donnybrook | Beelerup | Queenwood |
| Donnybrook | Brookhampton | Charley Creek |

Beelerup is a rural locality of the Shire of Donnybrook–Balingup in the South West region of Western Australia, along the Preston River.

Beelerup and the Shire of Donnybrook–Balingup are located on the traditional land of the Wardandi people of the Noongar nation.

The locality is home to three heritage listed sites: the Hale Mauka or Round House, and two locations in the Donnybrook Sandstone Quarry. The Hale Mauka homestead was designed and built by its original owner, Augustus Sharp, in 1905. Sharp was the first settler in the area to pump water for irrigation from the near-by Preston River and became a prominent fruit grower and member of the Preston Road District.

Beelerup was once a siding on the Donnybrook–Katanning railway but the railway line ceased operation in 1982. The original Beelerup siding opened in 1909, was relocated in 1912 and closed in 1961.
