= Grimwade, Western Australia =

Locality in the Shire of Donnybrook–Balingup, Western Australia

Grimwade
- other
- Coordinates: 33.70°S 115.04°E
- Country: Australia
- State: Western Australia
- LGA: Shire of Donnybrook–Balingup
- Location: 194 km (121 mi) from Perth; 57 km (35 mi) from Bunbury; 25 km (16 mi) from Donnybrook

Government
  - State electorate: Collie-Preston
  - Federal division: Forrest

Area
  - Total: 50 km^{2} (19 sq mi)

Population
  - Total: 0 (SAL 2016)
- Postcode: 6253
Localities around Grimwade
Thomson Brook	Noggerup	Noggerup
Kirup	Grimwade	Wilga West
Mullalyup	Balingup	Wilga West

Grimwade is a heavily forested locality of the Shire of Donnybrook–Balingup in the South West region of Western Australia. The Bibbulmun Track passes through Grimwade.

Grimwade and the Shire of Donnybrook–Balingup are located on the traditional land of the Wardandi people of the Noongar nation.

== History ==
The locality was originally known as East Kirupp, then East Kirup and, finally, Grimwade from around 1949, in honour of Russell Grimwade. It was the site of the East Kirup Mill, which operated from around 1910 to October 1929, also there was a period of inactivity during World War I. Milling operations at East Kirup recommenced at a small scale in 1950, with six employees, and some new houses constructed at the mill at the time. The people settling in the locality at the time were what the local newspaper described as "New Australians".

No evidence of the former mill or the dwellings the mill workers lived in now exists, with the last houses having been relocated to Kirup in the 1990s. During the operational period of the mill, East Kirup had a population of almost 500 people.
