= Mullalyup, Western Australia =

Mullalyup
- Town
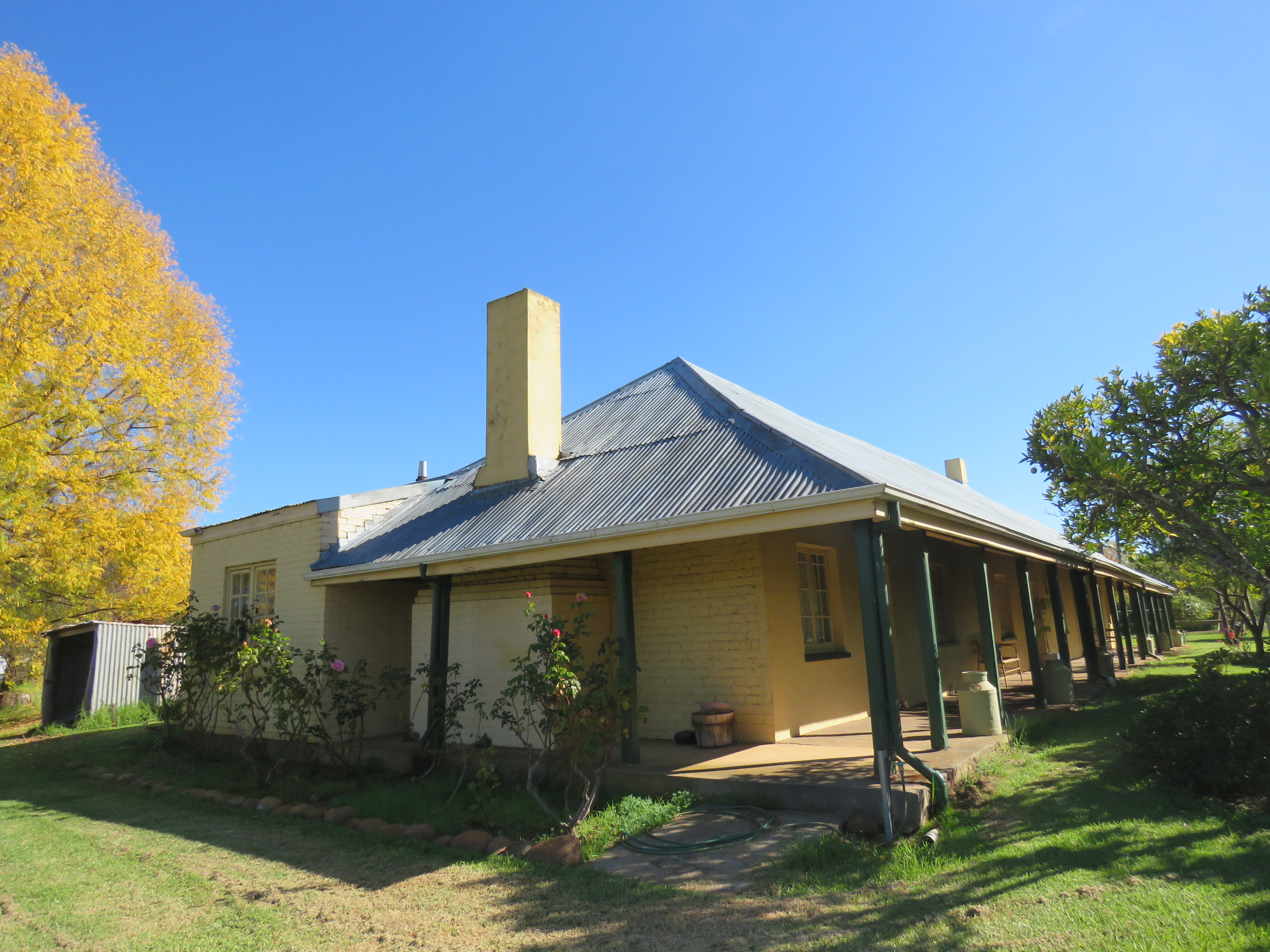
- The state heritage listed Blackwood Inn in Mullalyup

- Coordinates: 33.74°S 115.95°E
- Country: Australia
- State: Western Australia
- LGA(s): Shire of Donnybrook-Balingup
- Location: 231 km (144 mi) south of Perth; 15 km (9.3 mi) north west of Greenbushes; 23 km (14 mi) south east of Donnybrook
- Established: 1901

Government
  - State electorate(s): Warren-Blackwood
  - Federal division(s): Forrest

Area
  - Total: 82.7 km^{2} (31.9 sq mi)
- Elevation: 133 m (436 ft)

Population
  - Total(s): 149 (SAL 2021)
- Postcode: 6252
Localities around Mullalyup
Kirup	Kirup	Grimwade
Brazier	Mullalyup	Balingup
Cundinup	Southampton	Balingup

Mullalyup is a town in the South West region of Western Australia, situated between Kirup and Balingup on the South Western Highway, 231 kilometres (144 mi) south of Perth. The town is in the shire of Donnybrook-Balingup, known for its scenic Blackwood River Valley and agricultural industries.

The name is taken from the nearby Mullalyup Brook, and was first noted by John Forrest in 1866. It is Noongar in origin, and apparently means "nose place", as the place where nose-piercing was performed as part of the initiation cycle of young men. (Note: The suffix -up is commonly found in place names in south-western Western Australia and is of Noongar origin, meaning "place of".) Mullalyup and the Shire of Donnybrook–Balingup are located on the traditional land of the Wardandi people of the Noongar nation.

The first Europeans to settle in the area were the Coverley family who took land close to the town and named their farm "Elm Grove". The first major building in the town was the Blackwood Inn, built in 1882 by John Coverley for Thomas Maslin.

During the 1890s the town was included as a siding in the construction of the railway line from Donnybrook to Bridgetown. Later extended and known as the Northcliffe railway line, passenger services ceased in the late 20th century.

The town site was gazetted in 1901.

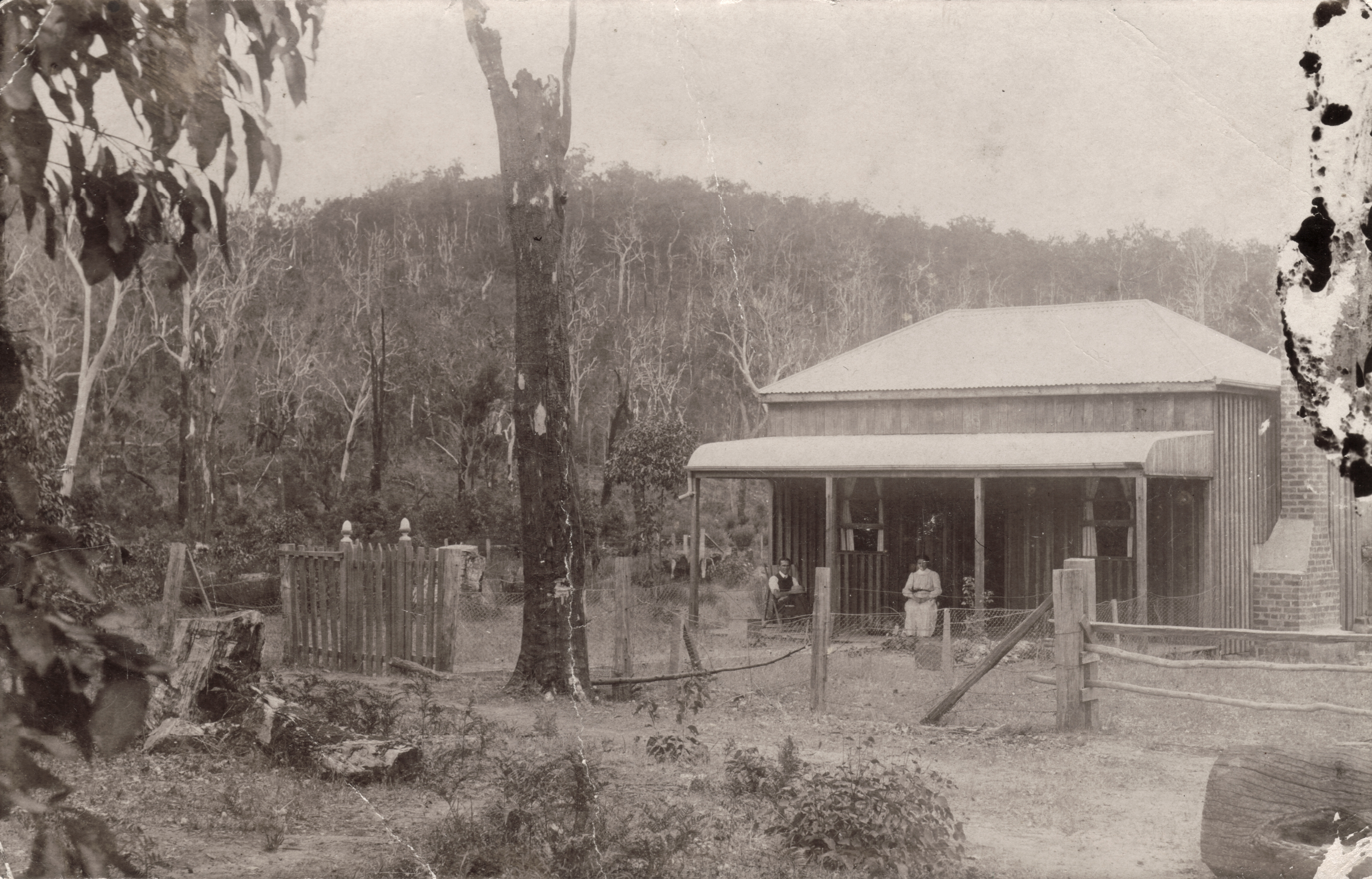
Mullalyup House, c. 1911
