= Queenwood, Western Australia =

Locality in the Shire of Donnybrook–Balingup, Western Australia

Queenwood
- other
- Coordinates: 33.54°S 115.90°E
- Country: Australia
- State: Western Australia
- LGA: Shire of Donnybrook–Balingup
- Location: 176 km (109 mi) from Perth; 36 km (22 mi) from Bunbury; 10 km (6.2 mi) from Donnybrook

Government
  - State electorate: Collie-Preston
  - Federal division: Forrest

Area
  - Total: 34.3 km^{2} (13.2 sq mi)

Population
  - Total: 79 (SAL 2021)
- Postcode: 6239
Localities around Queenwood
Wellington Forest	Wellington Forest	Lowden
Beelerup	Queenwood	Lowden
Beelerup	Charley Creek	Lowden

Queenwood is a rural locality of the Shire of Donnybrook–Balingup in the South West region of Western Australia. The Preston River and the Donnybrook–Boyup Brook Road run through the locality from east to west.

Queenwood and the Shire of Donnybrook–Balingup are located on the traditional land of the Wardandi people of the Noongar nation.

The locality is home to the heritage listed Queenwood Homestead, which dates back to 1890. At the time of its construction, it was part of a 10,000-acre (40 km^{2}) lease on the Preston River, with a substantial part of the land used for fruit growing.

Queenwood was once a siding on the Donnybrook–Katanning railway, but the railway line ceased operation in 1982. Queenwood's siding had a loading platform for fruit produced in the area. The location of the siding at Queenwood however was not seen as ideal by local settlers, who would have preferred a location at Charley Creek instead and petitioned for constructing one there in the 1920s, even being willing to cover some of the cost themselves. The main reason for the request was travel distances as it was claimed that the location of the siding at Queenwood only benefitted one farmer while it disadvantaged many others. Despite this, the Queenwood siding – which opened in 1913 – remained until 1977, when it was closed.
