= Wilga West, Western Australia =

Locality in the Shire of Donnybrook–Balingup, Western Australia

Wilga West
- other
- Coordinates: 33.72°S 116.16°E
- Country: Australia
- State: Western Australia
- LGA: Shire of Donnybrook–Balingup
- Location: 196 km (122 mi) from Perth; 64 km (40 mi) from Bunbury; 32 km (20 mi) from Donnybrook

Government
  - State electorate: Collie-Preston
  - Federal division: Forrest

Area
  - Total: 178 km^{2} (69 sq mi)

Population
  - Total: 18 (SAL 2021)
- Postcode: 6243
Localities around Wilga West
Noggerup	Noggerup	Wilga
Grimwade	Wilga West	Wilga
Balingup	Catterick	Benjinup

Wilga West is a rural, heavily forested locality of the Shire of Donnybrook–Balingup in the South West region of Western Australia.

The town of Wilga, located east of the locality, was established as a railway siding in 1909 and gazetted as a town in 1915. The name Wilga is of Aboriginal origin and may come from the near-by Wilgee Spring. Wilgee is the name for the red ochre worn for ceremonies.

Wilga West and the Shire of Donnybrook–Balingup are located on the traditional land of the Wardandi people of the Noongar nation.
