= Charley Creek, Western Australia =

Locality in the Shire of Donnybrook–Balingup, Western Australia

Charley Creek
- other
- Coordinates: 33.58°S 115.91°E
- Country: Australia
- State: Western Australia
- LGA: Shire of Donnybrook–Balingup
- Location: 180 km (110 mi) from Perth; 39 km (24 mi) from Bunbury; 9 km (5.6 mi) from Donnybrook

Government
  - State electorate: Collie-Preston
  - Federal division: Forrest

Area
  - Total: 21.7 km^{2} (8.4 sq mi)

Population
  - Total: 68 (SAL 2021)
- Postcode: 6239
Localities around Charley Creek
Beelerup	Queenwood	Lowden
Brookhampton	Charley Creek	Thomson Brook
Brookhampton	Thomson Brook	Thomson Brook

Charley Creek is a rural locality of the Shire of Donnybrook–Balingup in the South West region of Western Australia.

Charley Creek and the Shire of Donnybrook–Balingup are located on the traditional land of the Wardandi people of the Noongar nation.

Queenwood, adjacent to the north-west, was once a siding on the Donnybrook–Katanning railway, but the railway line ceased operation in 1982. Queenwood's siding had a loading platform for fruit produced in the area, but the location of the siding at Queenwood was not seen as ideal by local settlers, who would have preferred a location at Charley Creek instead and petitioned for constructing one there in the 1920s, even being willing to cover some of the cost themselves. The main reason for the request was travel distances as it was claimed that the location of the siding at Queenwood only benefitted one farmer while it disadvantaged many others.
