= Cundinup, Western Australia =

Locality in the Shire of Nannup, Western Australia

Cundinup
- other
- Coordinates: 33.85°S 115.77°E
- Country: Australia
- State: Western Australia
- LGA: Shire of Nannup
- Location: 210 km (130 mi) from Perth; 62 km (39 mi) from Bunbury; 15 km (9.3 mi) from Nannup

Government
  - State electorate: Warren-Blackwood
  - Federal division: O'Connor

Area
  - Total: 156.5 km^{2} (60.4 sq mi)

Population
  - Total: 62 (SAL 2021)
- Postcode: 6275
Localities around Cundinup
Yoganup	Brazier	Mullalyup
Barrabup	Cundinup	Southampton
Barrabup	Nannup	Nannup

Cundinup is a rural locality of the Shire of Nannup in the South West region of Western Australia. A small section in the far east of the locality is located in the Shire of Donnybrook–Balingup. The western boundary of the locality is formed by the Vasse Highway while, in the east, the border runs along the Blackwood River in places. Much of the locality is covered by state forest.

It is located on the traditional land of the Noongar nation.
