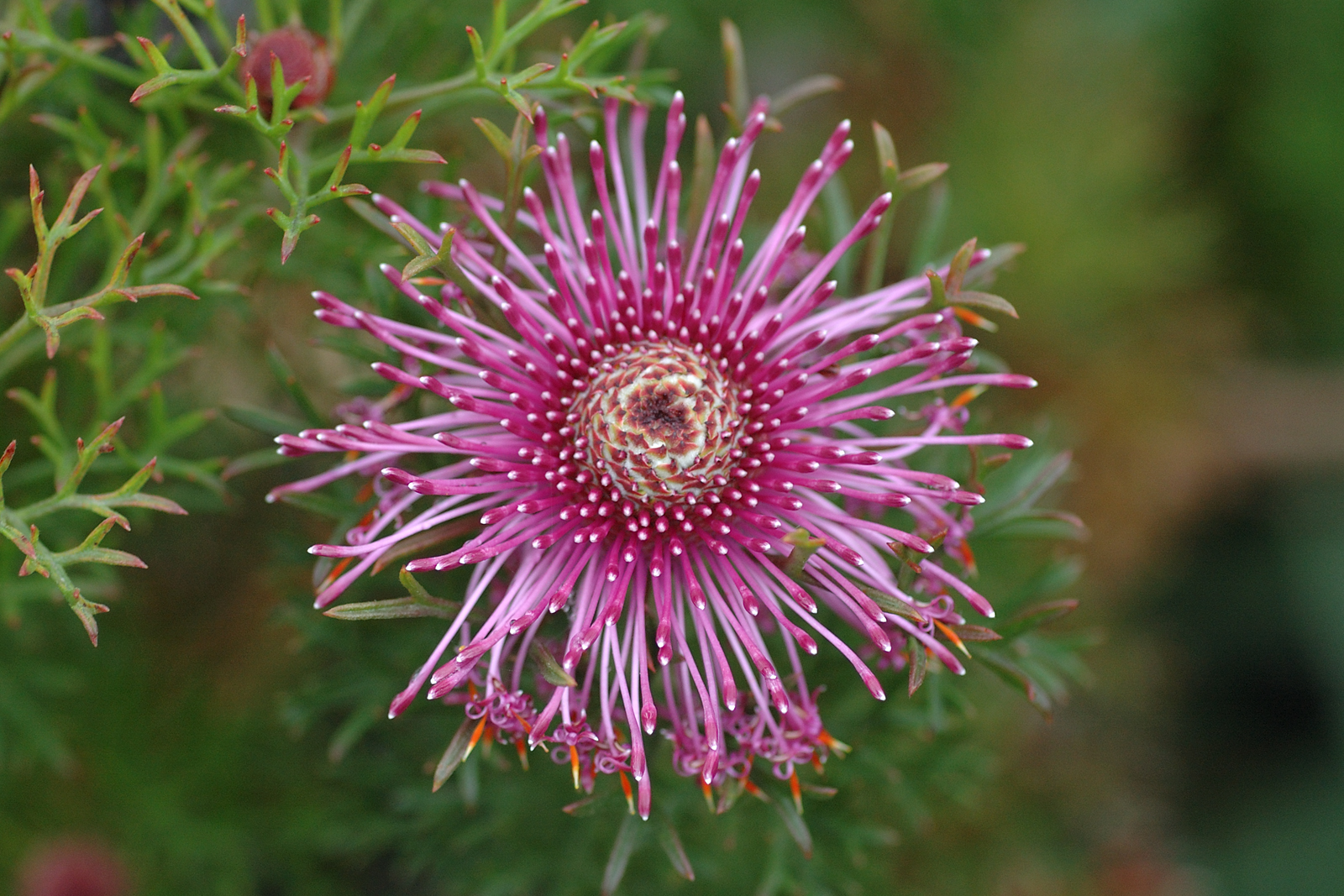
- Isopogon formosus at San Francisco Botanical Garden

Conservation status
- Least Concern (IUCN 3.1)

Scientific classification
- Kingdom: Plantae
- Clade: Tracheophytes
- Clade: Angiosperms
- Clade: Eudicots
- Order: Proteales
- Family: Proteaceae
- Genus: Isopogon
- Species: I. formosus

Binomial name
- Isopogon formosus R.Br.
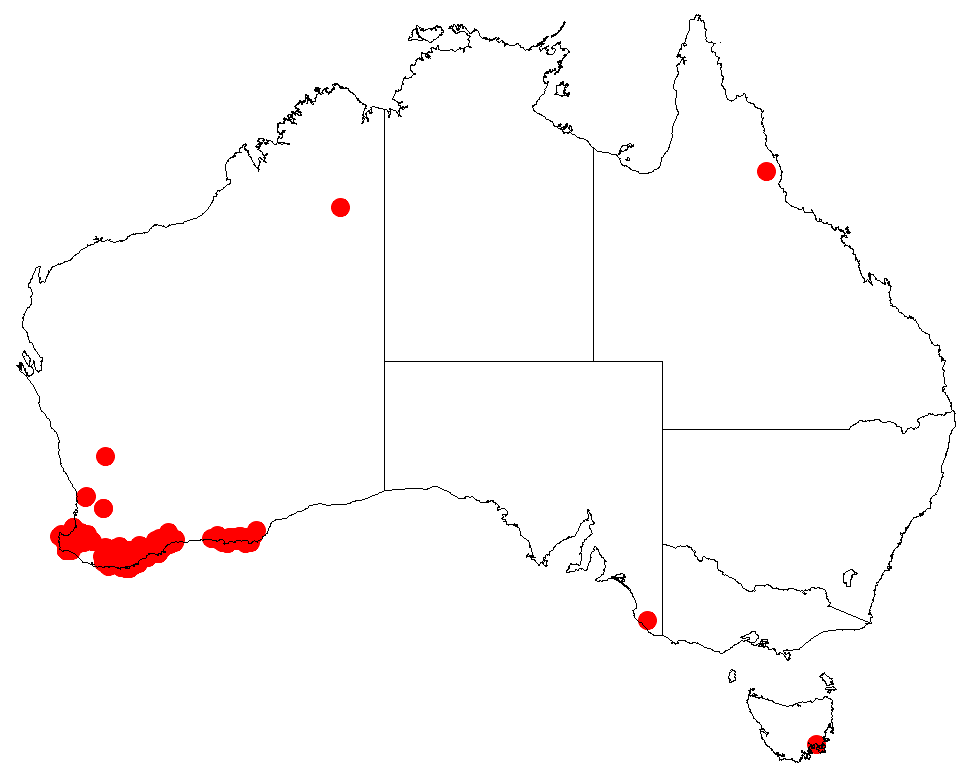
- Occurrence data from Australasian Virtual Herbarium

Synonyms
- Atylus formosus (R.Br.) Kuntze; Isopogon formosus var. eriolepis Meisn.

= Isopogon formosus =

Rose coneflower

Species of shrub endemic to Western Australia

Isopogon formosus, commonly known as rose coneflower, is a species of flowering plant in the family Proteaceae and is endemic to the south-west of Western Australia. It is a shrub with divided leaves with cylindrical segments, and spherical to oval heads of pink or red flowers.

== Description ==
Isopogon formosus is an erect or spreading shrub that typically grows to a height of 1.5–2 m (4 ft 11 in – 6 ft 7 in) with pale to reddish brown young branchlets. The leaves are up to 35 mm (1.4 in) long on a petiole up to 25 mm (0.98 in) long, and divided with grooved cylindrical segments that have a sharply-pointed tip. The flowers are arranged on the ends of branchlets or in upper leaf axils, in sessile, spherical to oval heads about 60 mm (2.4 in) in diameter with egg-shaped to lance-shaped involucral bracts at the base. The flowers are red or mauve-pink and more or less glabrous, and the fruit is a hairy nut fused with others in a spherical or oval head up to 20 mm (0.79 in) long in diameter.

== Taxonomy ==
Isopogon formosus was first formally described in 1810 by Robert Brown and the description was published in Transactions of the Linnean Society. The specific epithet (formosus) is a Latin word meaning "beautifully-formed" or "handsome".

In 1995, Donald Bruce Foreman described two subspecies of I. formosus in the Flora of Australia, and the names are accepted by the Australian Plant Census:

- Isopogon formosus subsp. dasylepis (Meisn.) Foreman that has generally hairier stems, leaves and involucral bracts than the autonym and flowers mainly from June to December;
- Isopogon formosus R.Br. subsp. formosus is more or less glabrous and mainly flowers from May to November.

Subspecies dasylepis was originally described in 1856 by Carl Meissner as I. formosus var. dasylepis in de Candolle's Prodromus Systematis Naturalis Regni Vegetabilis.

In a 2017 paper in the journal Nuytsia, Rye and Hislop reduced I. heterophyllus to a synonym of I. formosus subsp. formosus, but the change has not been accepted by the Australian Plant Census as at November 2020.

== Distribution and habitat ==
Rose coneflower grows in a range of soils in swampy places, rocky outcrops and on sandplains mainly between Bunbury and Esperance in the Esperance Plains and Jarrah Forest biogeographic regions. Subspecies dasylepis occurs between Busselton, Noggerup and the Scott River and subsp. formosus in near-coastal areas between Walpole and Hopetoun and from Dalyup to Cape Arid National Park.

== Conservation status ==
Subspecies formosus is classified as not threatened but subsp. dasylepis is classified as priority three by the Government of Western Australia Department of Parks and Wildlife meaning that it is poorly known and known from only a few locations but is not under imminent threat.

== Use in horticulture ==
Isopogon formosus requires excellent drainage and full sun. It will not tolerate long periods of dryness or heavy frost.
