= Upper Capel, Western Australia =

Locality in the Shire of Donnybrook–Balingup, Western Australia

Upper Capel
- Interactive map of Upper Capel
- Coordinates: 33.65°S 115.82°E
- Country: Australia
- State: Western Australia
- LGA: Shire of Donnybrook–Balingup
- Location: 183 km (114 mi) from Perth; 36 km (22 mi) from Bunbury; 3 km (1.9 mi) from Donnybrook

Government
  - State electorate: Collie-Preston
  - Federal division: Forrest

Area
  - Total: 107.9 km^{2} (41.7 sq mi)

Population
  - Total: 177 (SAL 2021)
- Postcode: 6239
Localities around Upper Capel
Paynedale	Donnybrook	Brookhampton
Yoganup	Upper Capel	Brookhampton
Yoganup	Brazier	Newlands

Upper Capel is a rural locality of the Shire of Donnybrook–Balingup in the South West region of Western Australia. The locality borders the South Western Highway at the north-east while the Capel River flows through it in the south-west.

Upper Capel was the original name for the railway siding established in 1898 that eventually became the town of Kirup. When a town was gazetted there in 1900, it was named Kirupp and then Kirup from 1931. The current locality of Upper Capel is north-west of the town of Kirup and not directly related.

Upper Capel and the Shire of Donnybrook–Balingup are located on the traditional land of the Wardandi people of the Noongar nation.

The locality is home to five heritage listed sites:

- Donnybrook Sandstone Quarry Pink (Pink Quarry)
- Donnybrook Sandstone Quarry Goldfield's (Goldfield's Quarry)
- Torridon Homestead
- Crendon Homestead
- Careydale

The Torridon Homestead dates back to 1873, while the Careydale and Crendon homesteads date to the 1880s.
