= Shire of Balingup =

Former local government area in Western Australia

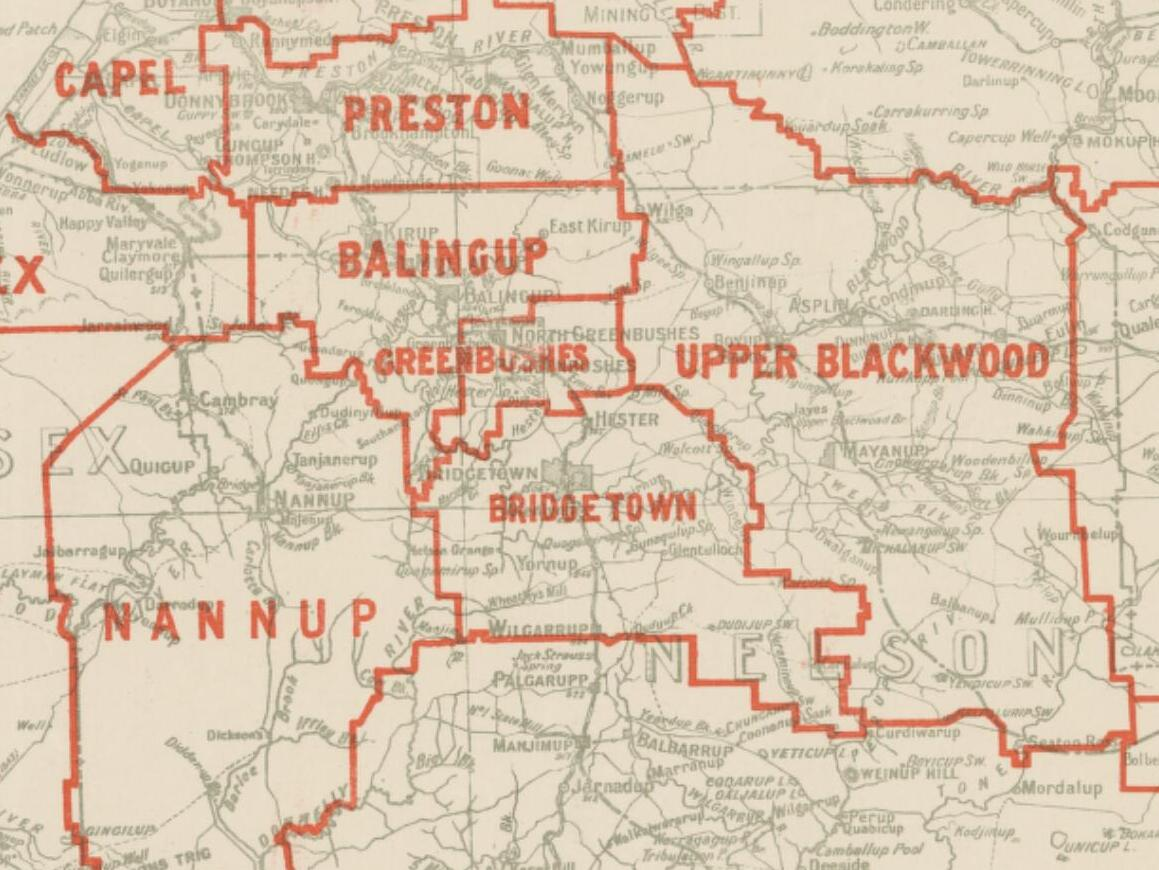
Balingup and surrounding road districts, 1935

The Shire of Balingup was a local government area in Western Australia. It was based in the town of Balingup. It was established as the Upper Capel Road District on 9 June 1899. It was renamed the Balingup Road District on 12 May 1905.

It was declared a shire and named the Shire of Balingup with effect from 1 July 1961 following the passage of the Local Government Act 1960, which reformed all remaining road districts into shires.

It amalgamated with the Shire of Donnybrook on 26 March 1970 to form the Shire of Donnybrook-Balingup, though for the first three months the amalgamated shire was also known as the "Shire of Donnybrook".
