= List of acts of the Parliament of Western Australia from 1892 =

This is a list of acts of the Parliament of Western Australia for the year 1892.

== 1892 ==
=== Public acts ===
Short title, or popular name	Citation	Royal assent
Long title
	55 Vict. No. 1	23 January 1892
An Act to apply out of the Consolidated Revenue Fund the sum of Eighty Thousand Pounds (Note: £80,000 in 1892 is equivalent to A$13,000,000 in 2022.) to the Service of the Year 1892.
Boyanup–Busselton Railway Act 1892	55 Vict. No. 2	1 February 1892
An Act to authorise the construction of a Railway from Boyanup to Busselton.
Mineral Lands Act 1892	55 Vict. No. 3	
Boyanup–Minninup Railway Act 1892	55 Vict. No. 4	1 February 1892
An Act to authorise the construction of a Railway from Boyanup to Minninup Bridge.
General Loan and Inscribed Stock Act Amendment Act 1892	55 Vict. No. 5	
Probation of First Offenders Act 1892	55 Vict. No. 6	
Bills of Sale Act 1879 Amendment Act 1892	55 Vict. No. 7	16 February 1892
An Act to amend "The Bills of Sale Act, 1879," (Note: Bills of Sale Act 1879 (43 Vict. No. 19)) and to extend the Security on future and after acquired Property.
	55 Vict. No. 8	18 March 1892
An Act to apply a sum out of the Consolidated Revenue to the Service of the year ending the last day of December, One thousand eight hundred and ninety-two, and to appropriate the Supplies granted in this Session of Parliament.
Sharks Bay Pearl Shell Fishery Act 1892	55 Vict. No. 9	
Settled Land Act 1892	55 Vict. No. 10	
Supreme Court Act (Amendment) 1892	55 Vict. No. 11	
Yilgarn Railway Act 1892	55 Vict. No. 12	18 March 1892
An Act to authorise the construction of a Railway from Northam to Southern Cross.
Public Offices and Officers Designation Act 1892	55 Vict. No. 13	
Affirmations Act 1892	55 Vict. No. 14	
Patent Act (Amendment) Act 1892	55 Vict. No. 15	
Municipal Institutions Act Amendment Act 1892	55 Vict. No. 16	
	55 Vict. No. 17	18 March 1892
An Act to apply out of the Consolidated Revenue Fund the annual Sum of Nine Hundred Pounds (Note: £900 in 1892 is equivalent to A$146,000 in 2022.) for the Salary of an additional Judge of the Supreme Court.
Aboriginal Offenders Act (Amendment) 1892	55 Vict. No. 18	18 March 1892
An Act to amend "The Aboriginal Offenders Act, 1883," and to authorise the Whipping of Aboriginal Native Offenders.
Geraldton–Mullewa Railway Act 1892	55 Vict. No. 19	18 March 1892
An Act to authorise the construction of a Railway from Geraldton to Mullewa.
Married Women's Property Act 1892	55 Vict. No. 20	
Goldfields Act Amendment Act 1892	55 Vict. No. 21	
Public Health Act 1886 Amendment Act 1892	55 Vict. No. 22	
	55 Vict. No. 23	18 March 1892
An Act to apply out of the Consolidated Revenue Fund the Annual Sum of One thousand pounds (Note: £1,000 in 1892 is equivalent to A$160,000 in 2022.) in augmentation of Ministerial Salaries.
Criminal Law Amendment Act 1892	55 Vict. No. 24	
Aborigines Protection Act (Amendment) 1892	55 Vict. No. 25	
	55 Vict. No. 26	18 March 1892
An Act to authorise the closing of certain Roads in the Township of Wonnerup.
Police Act 1892	55 Vict. No. 27	18 March 1892
An Act to consolidate and amend the Law relating to the Police in Western Australia.
Masters and Servants Act 1892	55 Vict. No. 28	
Governors of High School Appointment Act 1892	55 Vict. No. 29	18 March 1892
An Act to make better provision for the Appointment of Governors of the High School, Perth, and for other purposes.
South-Western Railway Act 1891 Amendment Act 1892	55 Vict. No. 30	18 March 1892
An Act to amend "The South-Western Railway Act, 1891." (Note: South-Western Railway Act 1891 (54 Vict. No. 14))
Customs Consolidation Act 1892	55 Vict. No. 31	
Bankruptcy Act 1892	55 Vict. No. 32	
Electric Lighting Act 1892	55 Vict. No. 33	18 March 1892
An Act to authorise Municipal Corporations to supply or to grant Licenses or make Contracts for the supply of Electricity for Lighting and other purposes.
	55 Vict. No. 34	18 March 1892
An Act to further amend "The Railways Act, 1878." (Note: Railways Act 1878 (42 Vict. No. 31))
Hawkers and Pedlars Act 1892	55 Vict. No. 35	
Game Act 1892	55 Vict. No. 36	
Municipal Water Supply Preservation Act 1892 or the Local Government Water Supply Preservation Act 1892 (repealed)	55 Vict. No. 37	18 March 1892
An Act for Preventing Pollution of the Waters within the Catchment Basins and Reservoirs of ~~Municipal~~ Local Government Water Supply Areas. (Repealed by Statute Law Revision Act 2006 (No. 37))

=== Private acts ===
Short title, or popular name	Citation	Royal assent
Long title
Western Australian Turf Club Act 1892	55 Vict. Private Act	18 March 1892
An Act to enable the Members of "The Western Australian Turf Club" to sue and be sued in the name of the Chairman for the time being of the Committee of the said Club and for other purposes.

== Sources ==
- "legislation.wa.gov.au".
