= Shire of Donnybrook =

Former local government area in Western Australia

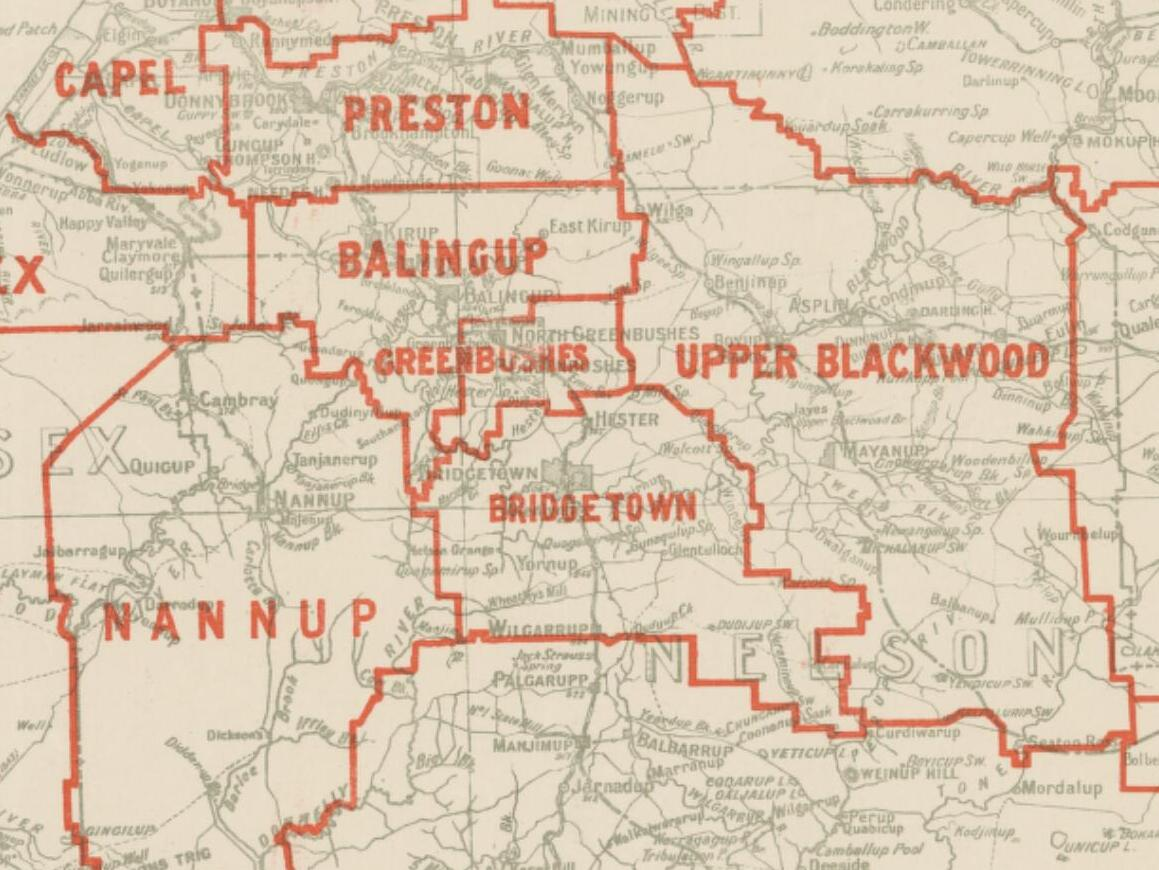
Preston (later Donnybrook) and surrounding road districts, 1935

The Shire of Donnybrook was a local government area in Western Australia. It was based in the town of Donnybrook. It was established as the Preston Road District on 10 July 1896.

It was declared a shire and named the Shire of Donnybrook with effect from 1 July 1961 following the passage of the Local Government Act 1960, which reformed all remaining road districts into shires.

It amalgamated with the Shire of Balingup to form the modern Shire of Donnybrook-Balingup on 26 March 1970, although the amalgamated shire retained the "Shire of Donnybrook" name until adopting its current name on 17 July 1970.
