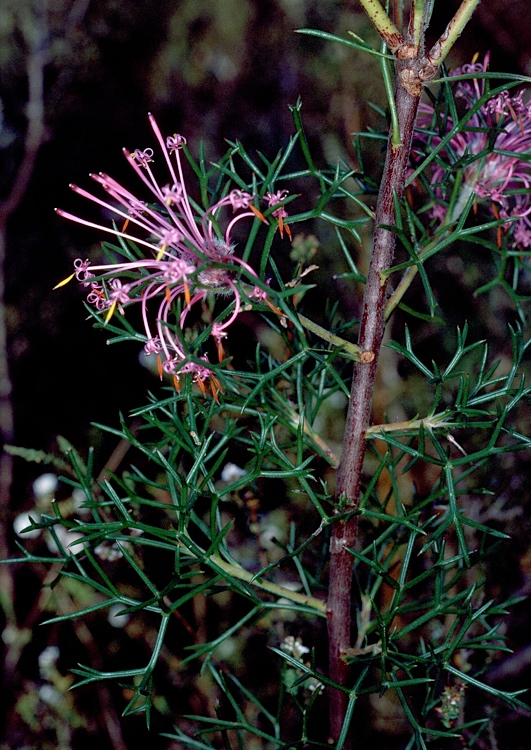
- Near Narrikup

Scientific classification
- Kingdom: Plantae
- Clade: Tracheophytes
- Clade: Angiosperms
- Clade: Eudicots
- Order: Proteales
- Family: Proteaceae
- Genus: Isopogon
- Species: I. heterophyllus

Binomial name
- Isopogon heterophyllus Meisn.

Synonyms
- Atylus heterophyllus (Meisn.) Kuntze; Isopogon occidentalis D.A.Herb.

= Isopogon heterophyllus =

Species of shrub

Isopogon heterophyllus is a plant in the family Proteaceae and is endemic to the southwest of Western Australia. It is a shrub with simple or pinnate, cylindrical leaves and hairy, usually pink flowers.

== Description ==
Isopogon heterophyllus is a shrub that typically grows to a height of 1.2 m (3 ft 11 in) with smooth brown or reddish brown branchlets. The leaves are up to about 80 mm (3.1 in) long, prickly, variably simple, pinnate or bipinnate, the segments up to 45 mm (1.8 in) long. The flowers are arranged in spherical, sessile heads about 60 mm (2.4 in) long in diameter on the ends of branchlets, each head with usually pink, sometimes lilac to mauve flowers up to about 30 mm (1.2 in) long, the heads with egg-shaped involucral bracts at the base. Flowering occurs from August to November and the fruit is a hairy nut up to 3 mm (0.12 in) long, fused in a cone-shaped to spherical head 15–20 mm (0.59–0.79 in) in diameter.

== Taxonomy and naming ==
Isopogon heterophyllus was first formally described in 1845 by Carl Meissner in Johann Georg Christian Lehmann's book Plantae Preissianae.

In 2017, Rye and Hislop proposed that I. heteropyllus is a synonym of Isopogon formosus subsp. formosus but their claim has not been assessed by the Australian Plant Census as at November 2020.

== Distribution and habitat ==
This isopogon grows in open woodland and shrubland and is common and widespread between Cranbrook, Albany, the Stirling Range National Park and Esperance.
