= Brookhampton, Western Australia =

Brookhampton
- other
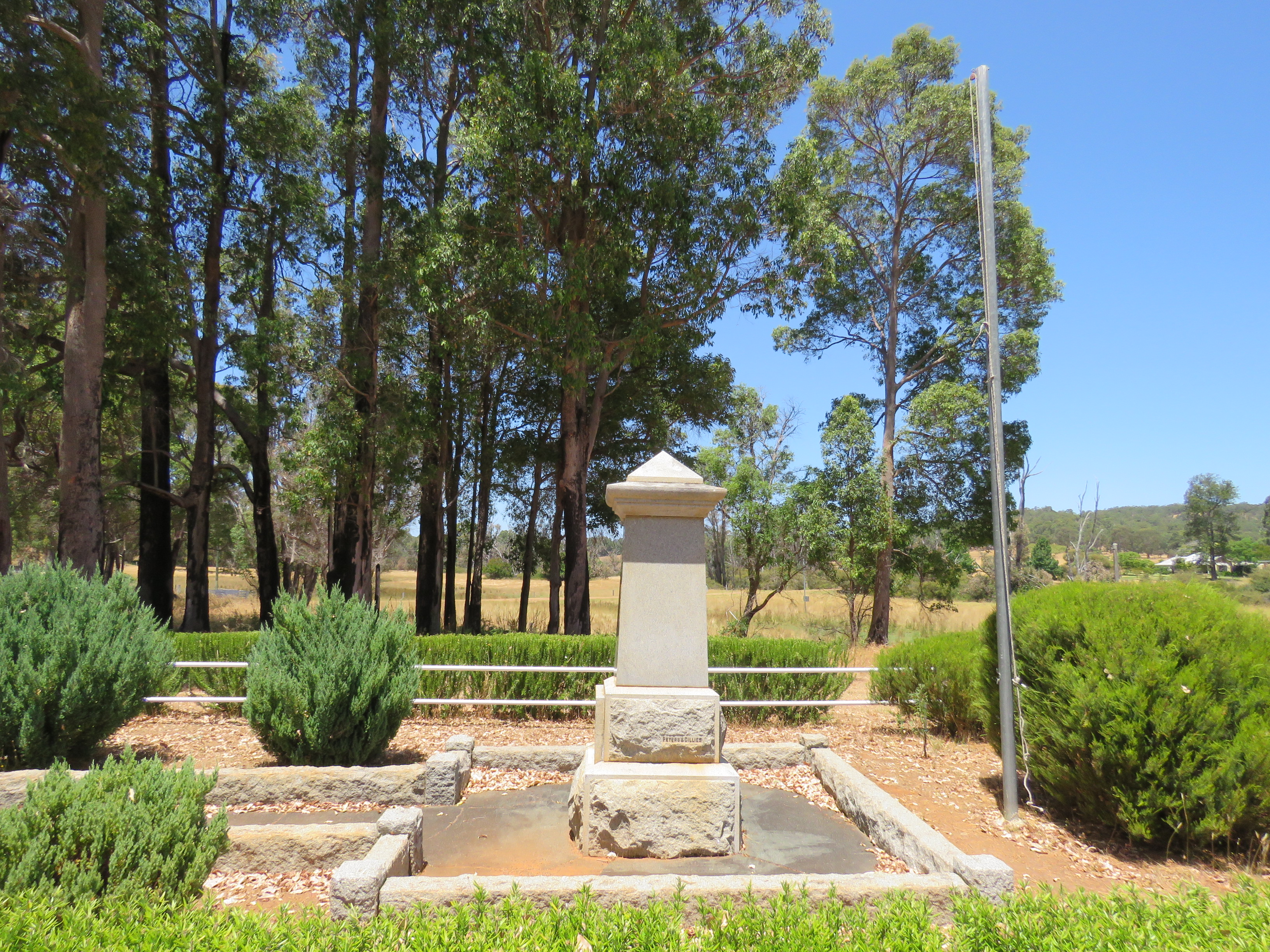
- The state heritage listed Brookhampton War Memorial in January 2022

- Coordinates: 33°36′32″S 115°52′19″E
- Country: Australia
- State: Western Australia
- LGA(s): Shire of Donnybrook-Balingup

Government
  - State electorate(s): Collie-Preston
  - Federal division(s): Forrest

Area
  - Total: 54.3 km^{2} (21.0 sq mi)

Population
  - Total(s): 249 (SAL 2021)
- Postcode: 6239
Localities around Brookhampton
Beelerup	Beelerup	Charley Creek
Upper Capel	Brookhampton	Thomson Brook
Newlands	Kirup	Kirup

Brookhampton is a locality in the Shire of Donnybrook-Balingup in the South West region of Western Australia.

It was first established as a railway station on the Donnybrook to Bridgetown railway line, which was completed in 1898. Later extended and known as the Northcliffe railway line, passenger services ceased in the late 20th century.

A primary school operated in the town from 1899 until 1940. The local hall was an important community event location in the 1920s. A woodchip mill was proposed for the locality in the early 2000s.
