= Shire of Donnybrook–Balingup =

Local government area in the South West region of Western Australia

Coordinates: 33°34′37″S 115°49′16″E

Shire of Donnybrook Balingup
- Local government area
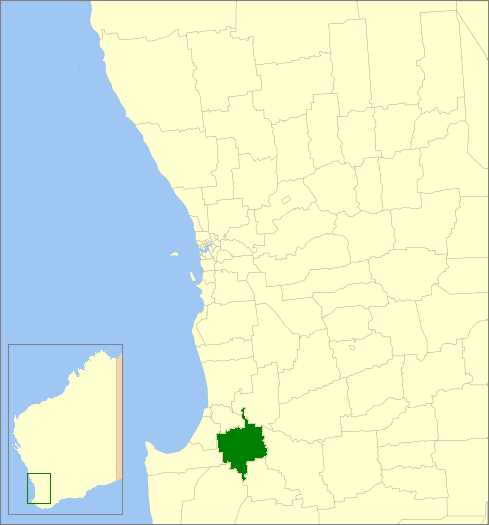
- Location in Western Australia

- Interactive map of Shire of Donnybrook Balingup
- Country: Australia
- State: Western Australia
- Region: South West
- Established: 1970
- Council seat: Donnybrook

Government
  - Shire President: Vivienne MacCarthy
  - State electorate: Collie-Preston Warren-Blackwood
  - Federal division: Forrest

Area
  - Total: 1,560.3 km^{2} (602.4 sq mi)

Population
  - Total: 6,155 (LGA 2021)
- Website: Shire of Donnybrook Balingup
LGAs around Shire of Donnybrook Balingup
Dardanup	Collie	Collie
Capel, Busselton	Shire of Donnybrook Balingup	Boyup Brook
Nannup	Bridgetown Greenbushes	Boyup Brook

The Shire of Donnybrook Balingup is a local government area in the South West region of Western Australia, about 35 kilometres (22 mi) southeast of Bunbury and about 220 kilometres (137 mi) south of the state capital, Perth. The Shire covers an area of about 1,560 square kilometres (602 sq mi), and its seat of government is the town of Donnybrook.

== History ==
The Shire of Donnybrook–Balingup was established on 26 March 1970 with the amalgamation of the Shire of Donnybrook and the Shire of Balingup. The merged shire initially retained the Donnybrook name, but adopted the Donnybrook-Balingup name on 17 July 1970. The new council was administered from Donnybrook.

The Shire of Donnybrook–Balingup is also home to a number of heritage-listed historic properties including Ferndale Homestead and Southampton homestead.

== Indigenous people ==
The Shire of Donnybrook–Balingup is located on the traditional land of the Wardandi people of the Noongar nation.

== Wards ==
In 2001 the Shire abolished wards and all nine councillors represent the entire shire.

Prior to this, four wards made up the council:

- Donnybrook (including Argyle, Irishtown and Beelerup)
- Preston (area east of Donnybrook including Lowden, Mumballup and Noggerup)
- Central (including Kirup, Upper Capel, Brazier, Newlands, Brookhampton and Thompsons Brook)
- Balingup (including Mullalyup, Grimwade, Upper Balingup, Southampton and Ferndale[Lower Balingup])

== Towns and localities ==
The towns and localities of the Shire of Donnybrook-Balingup with population and size figures based on the most recent Australian census:

Locality	Population	Area	Map
Argyle	575 (SAL 2021)	13.8 km^{2} (5.3 sq mi)	
Balingup	565 (SAL 2021)	88.5 km^{2} (34.2 sq mi)	
Beelerup	126 (SAL 2021)	27 km^{2} (10 sq mi)	
Brazier	40 (SAL 2021)	79 km^{2} (31 sq mi)	
Brookhampton	249 (SAL 2021)	54.3 km^{2} (21.0 sq mi)	
Charley Creek	68 (SAL 2021)	21.7 km^{2} (8.4 sq mi)	
Cundinup *	62 (SAL 2021)	156.5 km^{2} (60.4 sq mi)	
Donnybrook	3,035 (SAL 2021)	25 km^{2} (9.7 sq mi)	
Glen Mervyn	47 (SAL 2021)	37.8 km^{2} (14.6 sq mi)	
Grimwade	0 (SAL 2016)	50 km^{2} (19 sq mi)	
Kirup	156 (SAL 2021)	76.9 km^{2} (29.7 sq mi)	
Lowden	165 (SAL 2021)	44.7 km^{2} (17.3 sq mi)	
Mullalyup	149 (SAL 2021)	82.7 km^{2} (31.9 sq mi)	
Mumballup	100 (SAL 2021)	40.6 km^{2} (15.7 sq mi)	
Newlands	112 (SAL 2021)	23.4 km^{2} (9.0 sq mi)	
Noggerup	99 (SAL 2021)	194.9 km^{2} (75.3 sq mi)	
Paynedale	60 (SAL 2021)	76.5 km^{2} (29.5 sq mi)	
Queenwood	79 (SAL 2021)	34.3 km^{2} (13.2 sq mi)	
Southampton	84 (SAL 2021)	126.1 km^{2} (48.7 sq mi)	
Thomson Brook	89 (SAL 2021)	86.5 km^{2} (33.4 sq mi)	
Upper Capel	177 (SAL 2021)	107.9 km^{2} (41.7 sq mi)	
Wilga West	18 (SAL 2021)	178 km^{2} (69 sq mi)	
Yabberup	162 (SAL 2021)	68.6 km^{2} (26.5 sq mi)	

- (* indicates locality is only partially located within this shire)

== Heritage-listed places ==
As of 2023, 113 places are heritage-listed in the Shire of Donnybrook–Balingup, of which twelve are on the State Register of Heritage Places, among them the Southampton homestead.
