= Southampton homestead =

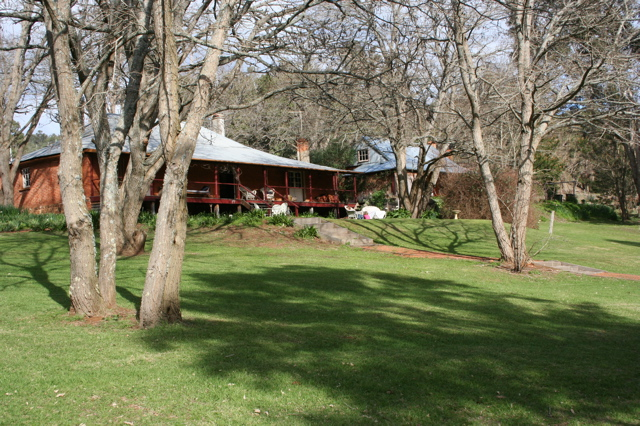
- Southampton Homestead in 2006

- Location within Western Australia

General information
- Type: Station
- Location: Balingup, Western Australia
- Coordinates: 33.888°S 115.972°E

Western Australia Heritage Register
- Reference no.: 710

Southampton homestead is a Victorian-Georgian historical homestead located on the banks of the Blackwood River in the south west of Western Australia.

It was constructed in 1862 by Richard Jones (1795-1876) and his two sons Richard and William with mud-bricks fired on the site and took two years to construct. The heritage property sits beside the Bibbulmun Track, and located some 12 km (7.5 mi) south of Balingup in the Shire of Donnybrook-Balingup.

At the height of the settlement's prosperity, the Jones family managed some 27,500 acres (111 km^{2}) of land. The family and workers produced wine, wheat, fruit and ran 600 head of cattle. Infrastructure included the Homestead proper, kitchen/bakery, flour mill, Dairy, workshops, brick kilns, jetty, boat shed and workers cottages.

The homestead was destroyed by a bushfire in February 2013.

== History ==
Southampton Homestead was so named after the United Kingdom Port of Southampton near which settlers Richard Jones and his wife Louisa and their five children sailed on the Lotus from Portsmouth in 1829 to pursue opportunities in the new Swan River colony of Perth, Western Australia. Arriving in 1829, the Joneses originally purchased a property on the corner of St Georges Terrace and Barrack Street in the city of Perth.

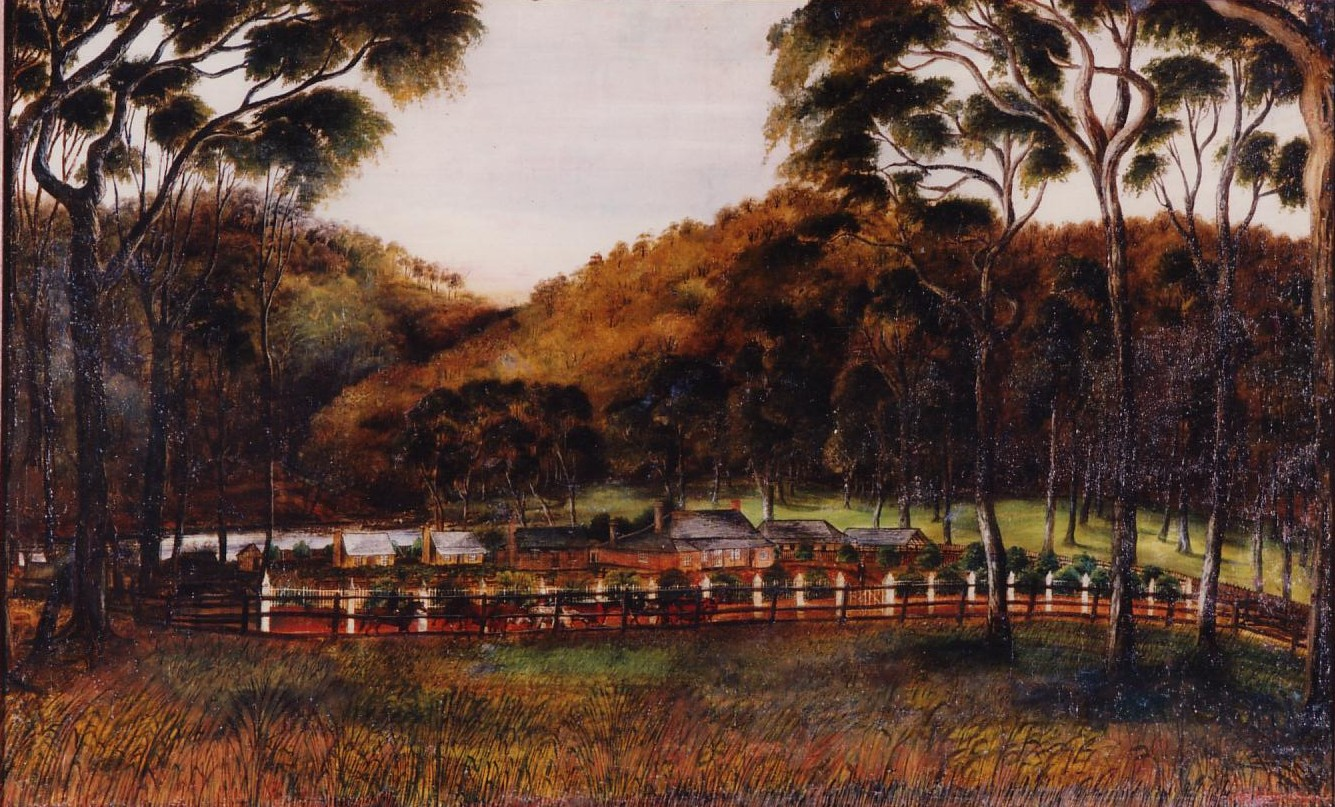
Southampton Homestead as painted by W.B. Benson in 1864

Tragedy struck in 1830 when Louisa became the first European woman to die in the new colony, succumbing during childbirth at the age of 29. The baby boy, Joseph, died 3 months after his mother. They are both buried in the historic East Perth Cemetery. This left Richard Jones a widower with five children. He subsequently engaged the services of a housekeeper, a Malaysian man John Allum, who remained in the service of the family for the next 40 years. John Allum died at the age of 83 and is buried on the hill behind the homestead overlooking the Blackwood Valley.

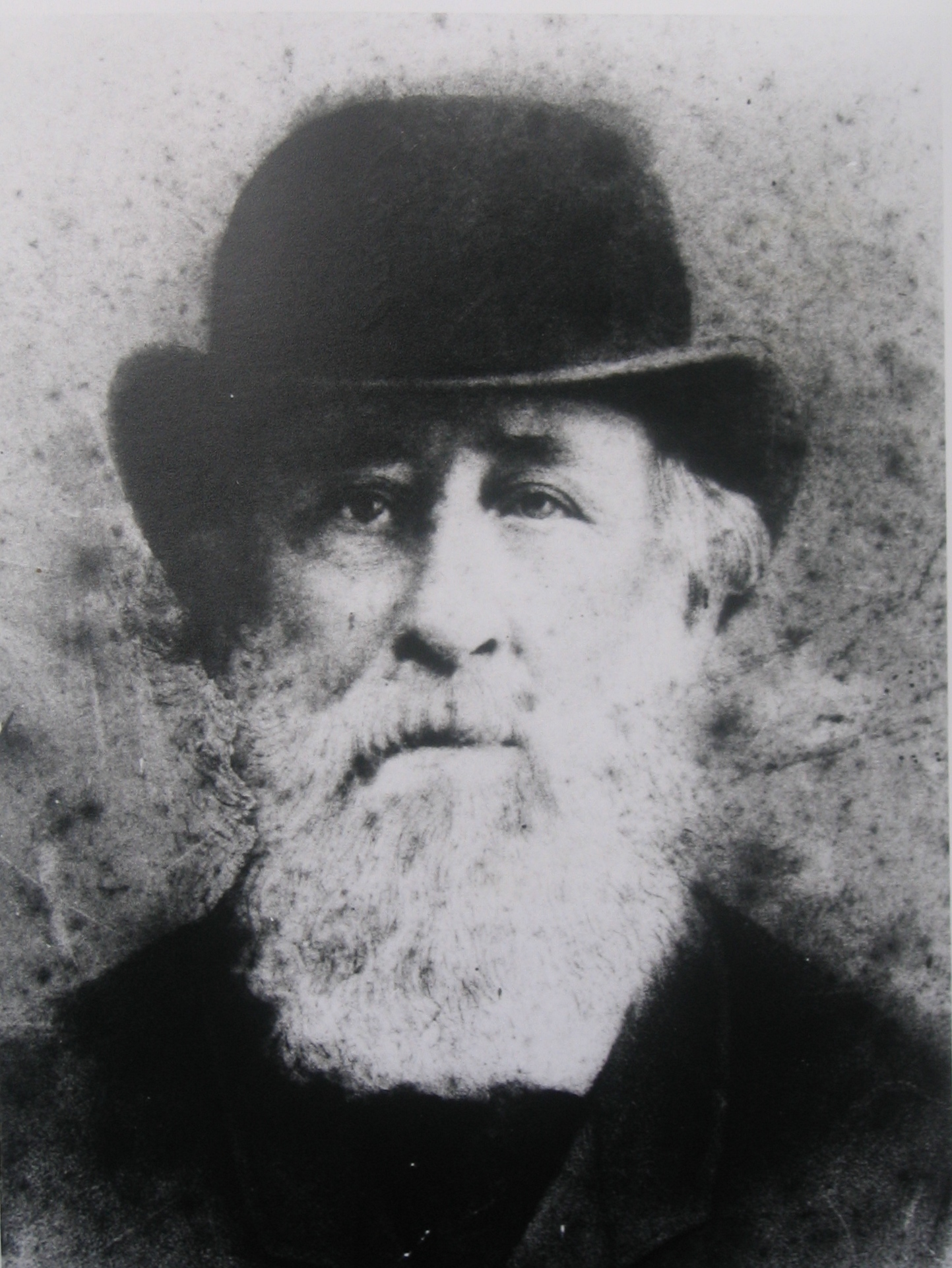
Richard Thomas Jones 1822-1903

Richard sold his city-central piece of real estate for 8,000 pounds in 1855 to purchase 10 acres (40,000 m^{2}) of newly released land on the Blackwood River South of Balingup with his two sons Richard and William on which they built a wattle and daub homestead. This first homestead was dramatically flooded by the Blackwood River the next winter in 1860. Its location was only recently discovered during archaeological investigations in June 2007.

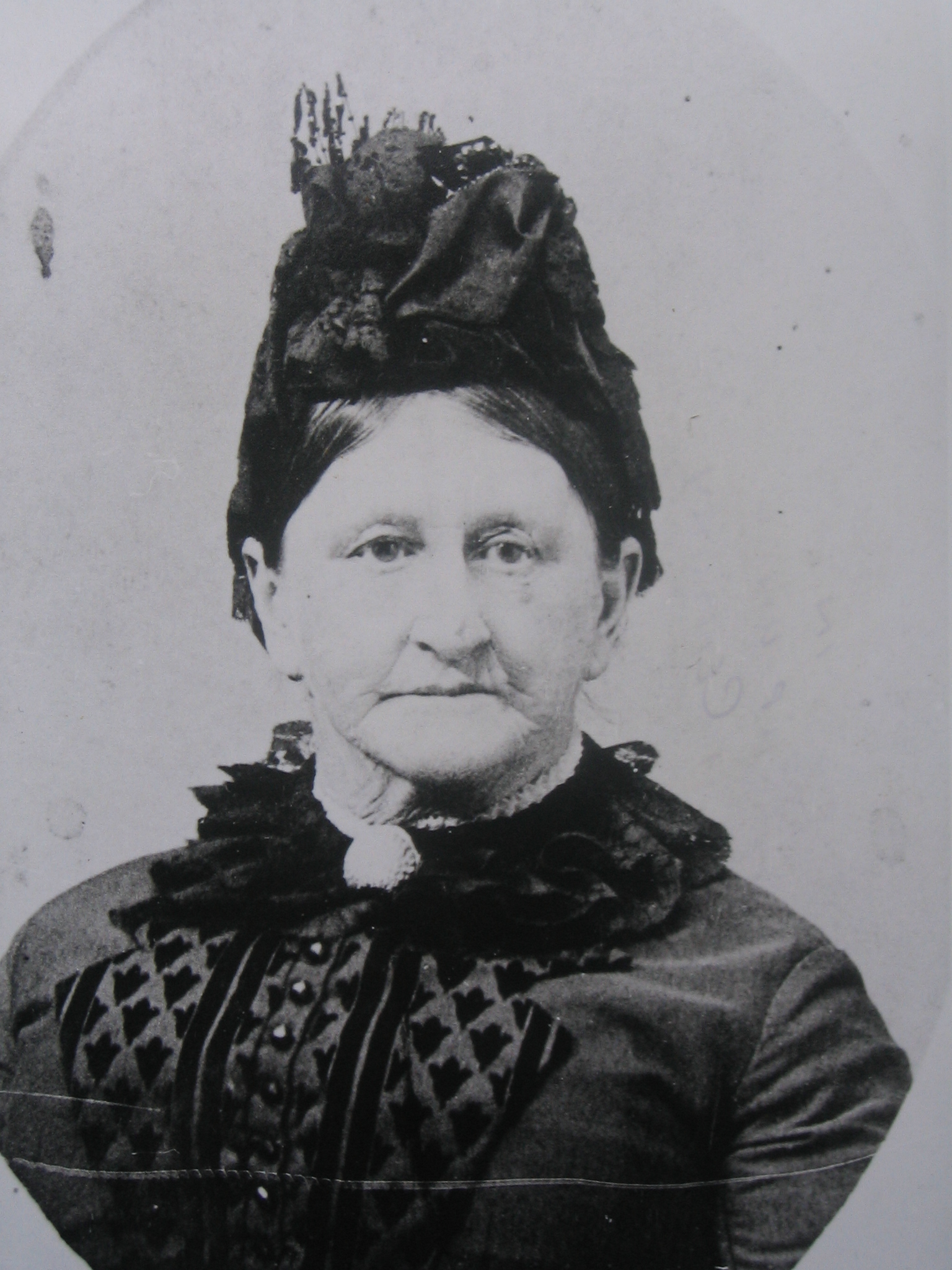
Richard and Louisa Jones' daughter Mary Ann c.1880

Richard and Louisa's Daughter Mary McHard (1826-1912) was widowed when her husband was killed in an industrial accident in Perth in 1864. Mary brought her four daughters with her to live on the property in 1864. Her four daughters produced the only direct descendants, who live in the Perth and the Southwest region of Western Australia.

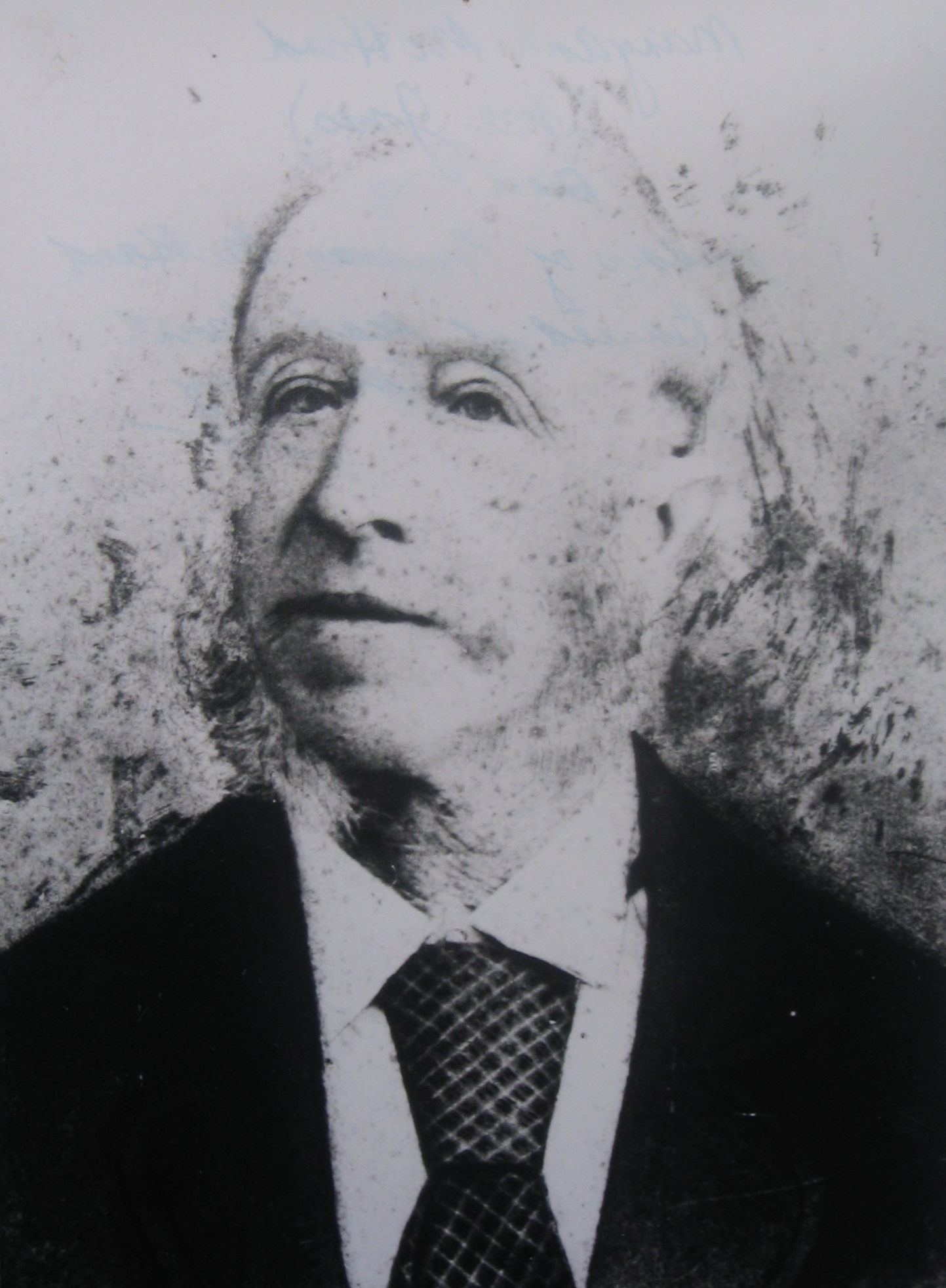
William James Jones 1823-1906

Richard Jones spent the remainder of his life at the Homestead with his two sons (William and Richard) and daughter Mary and her children. Neither of his sons married and hence there was no heir. He died aged 81 in 1876 and the sons and daughter continued working on the property. William, Richard Jr, and Mary remained on the property until as late as 1903. It was in this year that, on suffering depression from his failing health and eyesight, William took his own life.

Ownership of Southampton Homestead changed hands a number of times in the next 50 years, falling into disrepair and being procured by the Forest's Department in 1960. Extensive pine plantations of Pinus radiata were then established. The property was largely forgotten for the next 30 years until its heritage qualities were identified and the site slated for restoration in the late 1990s.

During a storm in February 2013, lightning strikes started a severe bushfire in the area. Driven by strong SW winds, the fire swept through the valley in which the homestead was situated and - despite firefighters' best efforts - razed it.

== Archaeology ==
A team of 15 archaeologists from the University of Western Australia and University of Notre Dame Australia and the Archaeological Society of WA surveyed the site as part of Phase 2 of the Conservation Plan commissioned by the Western Australian Heritage Council. Excavations in June 2007 began an historical and forensic investigation of the Heritage site. Outcomes of the investigation were the identification of the site of the original 1860 Homestead and the site of the Mill, approximately 2.7 kilometres south of the homestead. Of the seven buildings originally on the site, the archaeological survey goals are to identify the location, role and fabric of some of these buildings. There still remains only rudimentary evidence of most of them.

== Heritage ==
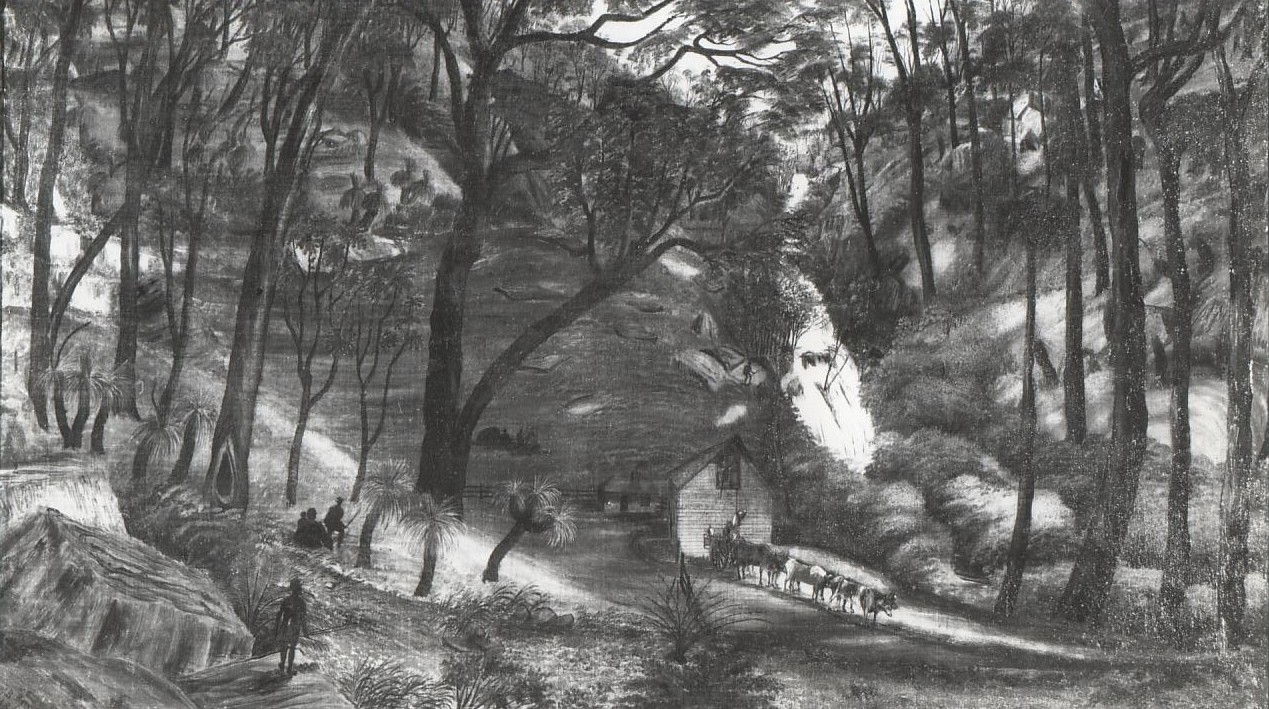
Southampton Mill as painted by W.B. Benson in 1864

The property is highly valued by the local community and the government. It was recently awarded a triple-heritage listing with Local, State and Federal Australian government. The Conservation Plan outlines a three-phase program. Phase 1 focused on the salvage and restoration of Southampton Homestead and adjacent Bakery Cottage. This work was largely complete by 2002. The homestead is typical of mid-19th century constructions and no early restoration work appears to have been attempted. This would have damaged or altered the building's fabric, as was typical in this region in the latter half of the 20th century. The building's fabric is preserved as a result of this.

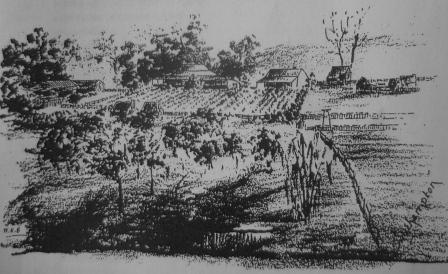
Southampton circa 1895. "Western Australia; The Garden of the Colony. Bunbury, Busselton, Bridgetown & c"
