= Noggerup, Western Australia =

Locality in the Shire of Donnybrook–Balingup, Western Australia

Noggerup
- Town
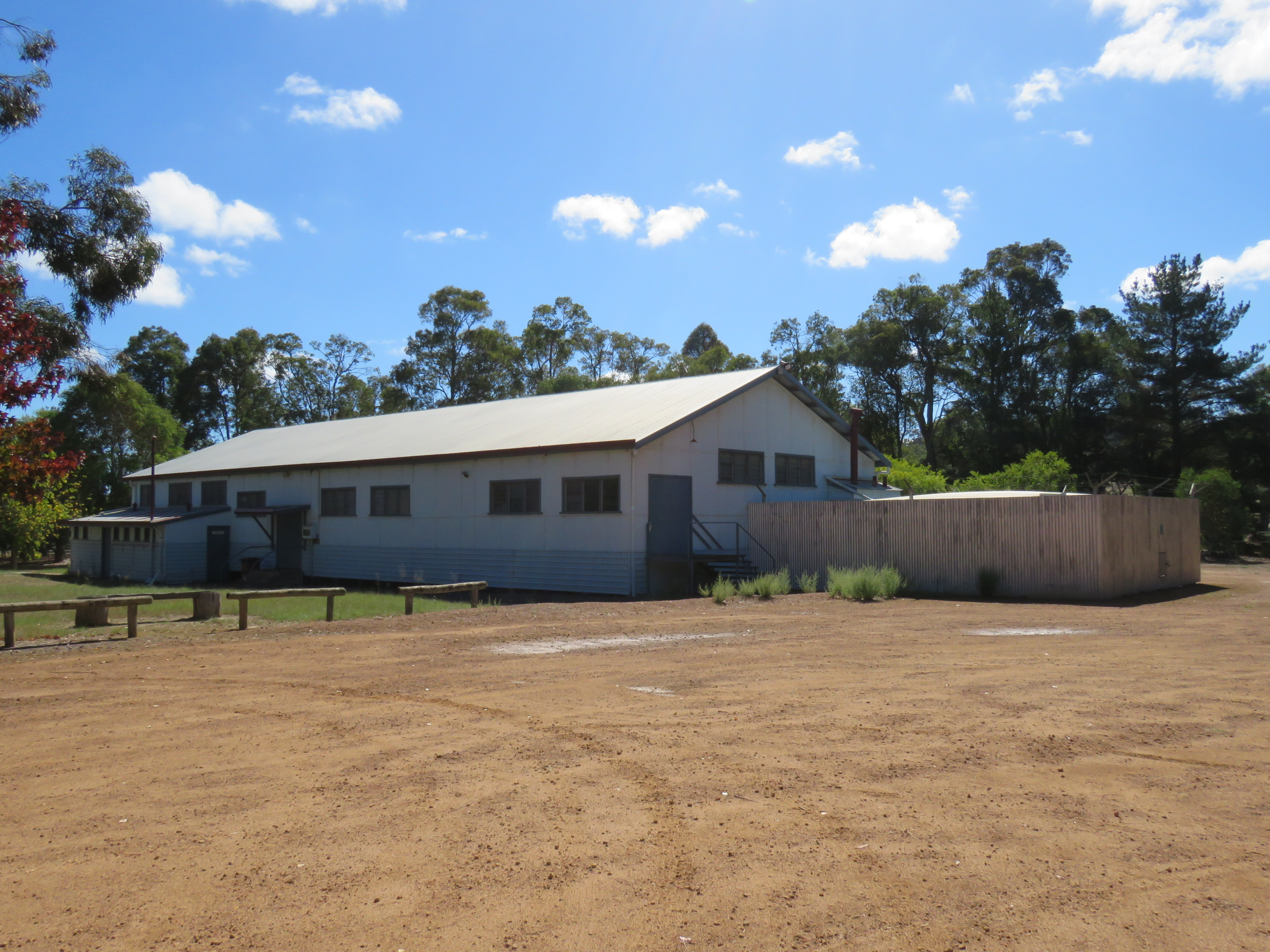
- Noggerup Hall in April 2022
- Coordinates: 33.58°S 116.16°E
- Country: Australia
- State: Western Australia
- LGA: Shire of Donnybrook–Balingup
- Location: 183 km (114 mi) from Perth; 57 km (35 mi) from Bunbury; 30 km (19 mi) from Donnybrook
- Established: 1909

Government
  - State electorate: Collie-Preston
  - Federal division: Forrest

Area
  - Total: 194.9 km^{2} (75.3 sq mi)

Population
  - Total: 99 (SAL 2021)
- Postcode: 6225
Localities around Noggerup
Yabberup	Mumballup	Cardiff
Thomson Brook	Noggerup	McAlinden
Grimwade	Wilga West	Wilga

Noggerup is a rural town and locality of the Shire of Donnybrook–Balingup in the South West region of Western Australia. A large portion of the Greater Preston National Park is located within Noggerup.

Noggerup was once a siding on the Donnybrook–Katanning railway, but the railway line ceased operation in 1982. The Noggerup siding, which opened in 1908 as the Preston Valley siding, was soon renamed and eventually closed in 1985.

The origin of the townsite of Noggerup dates back to the arrival of the railway, when a request for a terminus at the Sexton & Drysdale's Mill was made in 1907. Noggerup's location was fixed and surveyed the following year and gazetted in 1909. Initially, the town was spelled Noggerupp, in accordance with spelling requirements for Aboriginal place names in the state. The second p at the end of the name was omitted in 1915, but the meaning of the name is not known.

Noggerup and the Shire of Donnybrook–Balingup are located on the traditional land of the Wardandi people of the Noongar nation.
