= Southampton, Western Australia =

Locality in the Shire of Donnybrook–Balingup, Western Australia

Southampton
- other
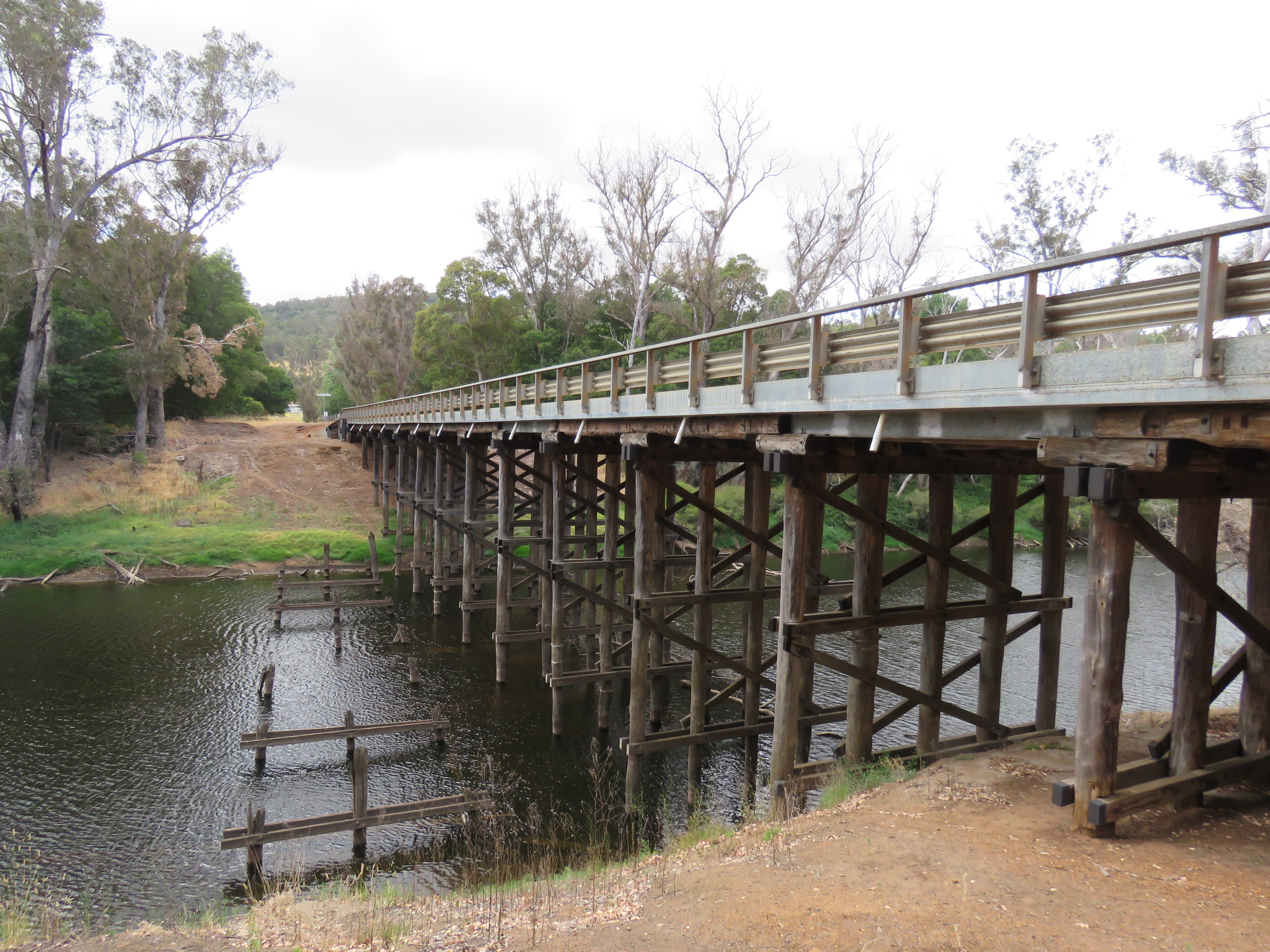
- Wright's Bridge over the Blackwood River in Southampton
- Coordinates: 33.85°S 115.95°E
- Country: Australia
- State: Western Australia
- LGA: Shire of Donnybrook–Balingup
- Location: 210 km (130 mi) from Perth; 65 km (40 mi) from Bunbury; 30 km (19 mi) from Donnybrook

Government
  - State electorate: Warren-Blackwood
  - Federal division: Forrest

Area
  - Total: 126.1 km^{2} (48.7 sq mi)

Population
  - Total: 84 (SAL 2021)
- Postcode: 6253
Localities around Southampton
| Mullalyup | Balingup | Greenbushes |
| Nannup | Southampton | Greenbushes |
| Nannup | Maranup | Maranup |

Southampton is a rural locality of the Shire of Donnybrook–Balingup in the South West region of Western Australia. The Blackwood River runs through the locality from its south-eastern corner to the north-west.

Southampton and the Shire of Donnybrook–Balingup are located on the traditional land of the Wardandi people of the Noongar nation.

The locality is home to three heritage listed sites: two of which are on the State Register of Heritage Places, Ferndale and Lewana, while the third one, Bridge Cottage, is on the municipal register. Ferndale, a single-storey mud brick and corrugated iron building and one of the earliest homesteads in the area, dates back to 1859, built by the earliest white settlers in the Balingup district. Lewana, meaning wind in the local indigenous language, dates back to 1931, and consists of a homestead, a barn, five forestry cottages, a cabin, a workshop and seven single garages. All buildings are constructed from jarrah and weatherboard, with corrugated iron roofs.
