= Balingup, Western Australia =

Balingup
- Town
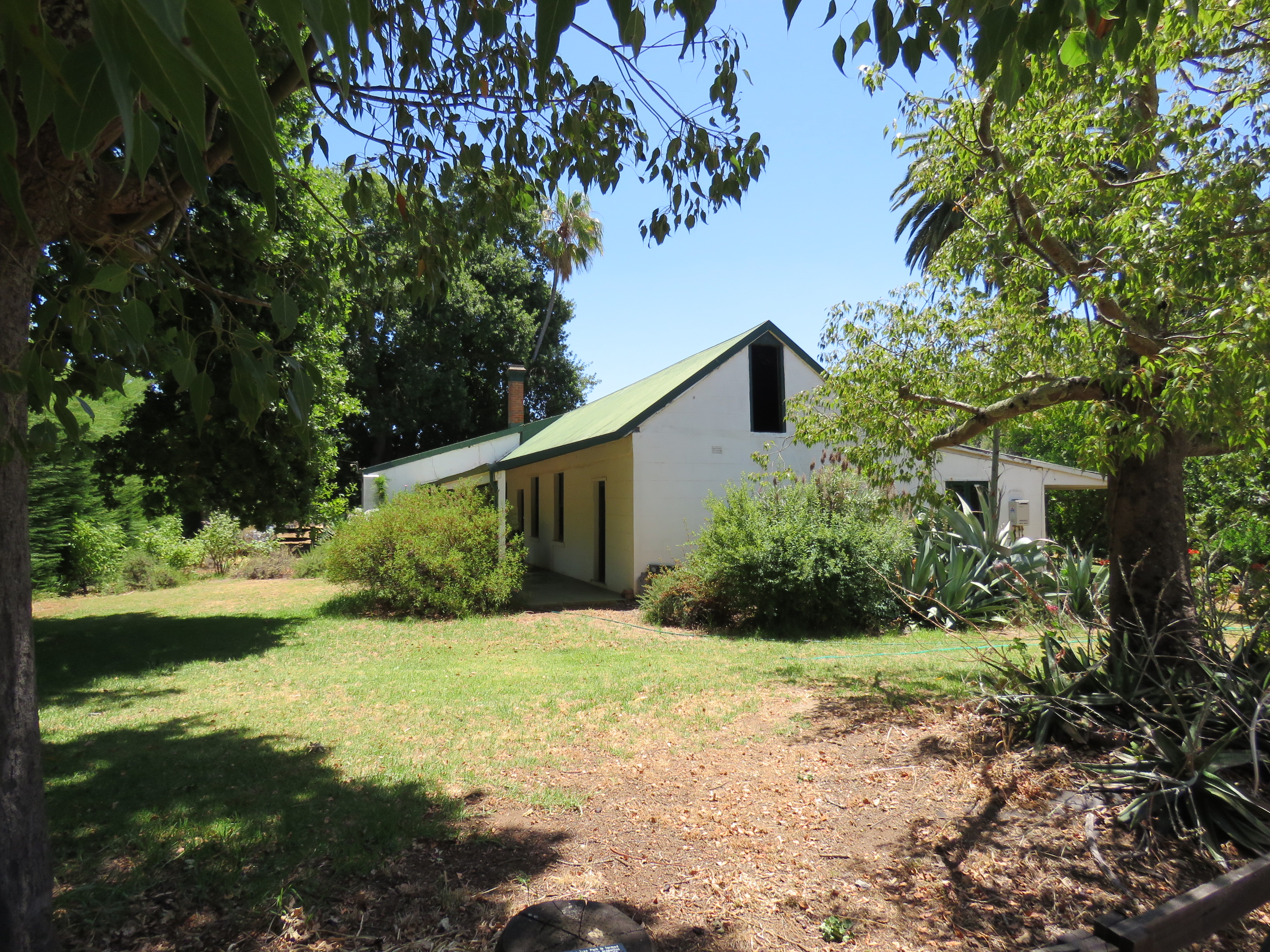
- The state heritage listed Golden Valley Homestead in January 2022

- Interactive map of Balingup
- Coordinates: 33°47′13″S 115°58′55″E
- Country: Australia
- State: Western Australia
- LGA: Shire of Donnybrook-Balingup
- Location: 241 km (150 mi) south of Perth; 24 km (15 mi) north west of Bridgetown; 38 km (24 mi) west of Boyup Brook
- Established: 1898

Government
  - State electorate: Collie Preston
  - Federal division: Forrest

Area
  - Total: 88.5 km^{2} (34.2 sq mi)
- Elevation: 116 m (381 ft)

Population
  - Total: 280 (UCL 2021)
- Postcode: 6253
Localities around Balingup
Mullalyup	Grimwade	Wilga West
Southampton	Balingup	Wilga West
Southampton	Greenbushes	North Greenbushes

Balingup is a town in the South West region of Western Australia, 241 kilometres (150 mi) south of the state capital, Perth, and 31 kilometres (19 mi) southeast of the town of Donnybrook.

The town takes its name from Balingup Pool, located on the Balingup Brook which flows through the town. The name was first recorded by a surveyor in 1850, and is said to be derived from the name of Noongar warrior, Balingan. Other research by Noongar academic and researcher Len Collard has shown the name derives from the language, meaning "one that is situated there at this place". (Note: The suffix -up is commonly found in place names in south-western Western Australia and is of Noongar origin, meaning "place of".) Balingup and the Shire of Donnybrook–Balingup are located on the traditional land of the Wardandi people of the Noongar nation.

The town is on the South Western Highway. It originally had a station on the Northcliffe branch railway, opened in 1898, the same year the town was gazetted. Passenger services ceased in the late 20th century.

Balingup was known in the twentieth century for fruit and vegetable growing, and more recently for beef cattle and organic produce. There are two long-established religious communities.

Balingup hosts annual rural festivals, primarily the Small Farm Field Day (late April) and Medieval Carnivale (August).

Nearby are found mushroom varieties of interest to both drug users and law enforcement agencies. A large mushroom statue pays homage to the regions association with fungi and can be found on the Balingup Nannup road near the old cheese factory.

Balingup is also one of the few towns through which the Bibbulmun Track passes.

A bushfire swept through the area in 2013, reducing the Southampton homestead to ruins.
