= Northcliffe railway line =

Former railway in Western Australia

Northcliffe branch
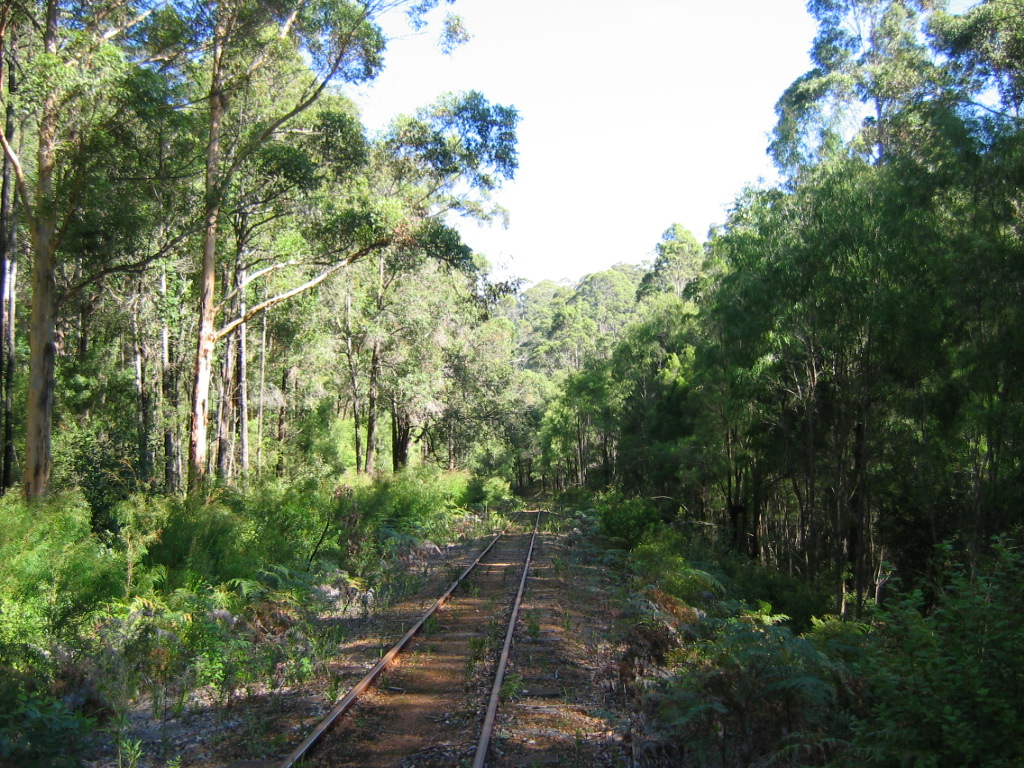
- The line through karri forests south of Pemberton

Overview
- Owner: Public Transport Authority; Arc Infrastructure; Pemberton Tramway Company
- Termini: Picton; Northcliffe

Service
- Type: Heavy rail
- Operator(s): Pemberton Tramway Company; Aurizon

History
- Opened: 12 March 1891 (Bunbury-Boyanup) then in stages until 27 November 1933 (Pemberton-Northcliffe)

Technical
- Line length: 205 km (127 mi)
- Track gauge: 1,067 mm (3 ft 6 in)

The Northcliffe branch, also known as the Northcliffe section or Picton to Northcliffe line, is the railway route between Picton and Northcliffe in Western Australia.

== History ==
The line was the first one in the Bunbury area, officially opening as the Western Australian Government Railways (WAGR) Bunbury-Boyanup Railway on 12 March 1891. E. V. H. Keane had commenced construction in 1887 and the line was largely complete by late 1888, but financial difficulties delayed the opening for several years.

Construction continued, with the official opening of the Byfield & Risely-constructed Boyanup-Donnybrook section on 16 November 1893. A few months prior, the South Western Railway opened between Pinjarra and Bunbury, absorbing the Bunbury-Picton section of the Boyanup line. A year later, on 21 November 1894, the first section of the Flinders Bay branch opened between Boyanup and Busselton, coinciding with a reconfiguration of Boyanup Station to a transfer-friendly island platform arrangement.

The Donnybrook to Bridgetown section of the line was constructed by W. N. Hedges and officially opened on 1 November 1898. Bridgetown remained the terminus for a number of years, however the first section of the Donnybrook-Katanning railway, to Noggerup, was built by the Public Works Department and opened on 26 March 1908. The Northcliffe line was next extended to Jardee (originally called Jarnadup), with the Public Works Department-built section opening on 14 June 1911. The State Saw Mills were created in 1913 by the Scaddan Government to support the State Government's desire to supply sleepers for the Trans-Australian Railway project. In order to service this sleeper supply contract, the State Saw Mills opened two mills south of Jardee, in Big Brook (now called Pemberton). The line from Jardee to Pemberton was constructed by the Public Works Department and opened as a State Saw Mills tramway on 20 January 1914.

The Group Settlement Scheme greatly impacted the development of the region, with the first settlers arriving near Manjimup in 1921. After lobbying from settlers, the line from Jarnadup to Pemberton was upgraded with heavier rails and station buildings constructed, with ownership transferring to WAGR line on 11 October 1926. While pre-construction and surveys of the line to serve the settlers further south in Northcliffe commenced in 1924, significant works did not commence until 1929. The Public Works Department built the line at significant cost to navigate the terrain, making it the most expensive railway per mile in the state when it officially opened on 27 November 1933. The final train to Pemberton operated in December 1986, after which time the line was leased and used as a tramway by the Pemberton Tramway Company.

=== Beyond Northcliffe ===
When the line from Jardee was taken over by the WAGR and extended to Northcliffe it was considered as part of a longer line connecting to the Nornalup branch to provide a southern route to Albany. The initial intent was to continue construction of the line beyond Northcliffe to Walpole, with surveys undertaken for this section. However, as the costs of the Northcliffe section soared, the decision was made to terminate the line there in 1933.

While the WAGR never built the line to Westcliffe, the Kauri Timber Company did use 11km of the surveyed alignment for its timber tramway from Northcliffe. This included a notable 600 feet (180 m) long, 30 feet (9.1 m) high timber bridge over Palm Creek.

=== Royal train derailment ===
The Northcliffe branch is notable for being the site of a royal train derailment. During the then Prince of Wales' (Edward VIII) visit to the region in 1920 he travelled by special train, which derailed near Wilgarup while travelling from Manjimup to Bridgetown. Photos of the incident indicate that his carriage rolled, ending on its side. No significant injuries were noted.

== Alignment ==
As operated by the WAGR, the line was 127 miles 49 chains (127.61 miles, 205.37 km) from Picton to Northcliffe. Most of the line remains in place, although disused, with few changes since it was last operated. However, a section through Manjimup has been lifted as part of its Town Centre Revitalisation project, although the rail reserve remains theoretically available for future rail uses.

Like all railways outside of Perth, the line is not electrified and is predominantly single-track, with passing loops at various locations. The section from Picton to Lambert is controlled by the Arc Infrastructure, with the remainder of the line to Northcliffe controlled by the Pemberton Tramway Company, under arrangement with the Public Transport Authority.

Heading south from Picton, the line traverses predominantly agricultural land to Boyanup, where the South West Rail and Heritage Centre sits adjacent to the Shire of Capel's heritage-registered Boyanup Railway Precinct. From here, the line climbs through the Preston River Valley to Donnybrook and traverses a mix of agricultural and forested land south to Manjimup. Heading to Pemberton, the line passes the Diamond Tree and increasingly forested areas. The section from Pemberton to Northcliffe through dense karri forests and over several bridges is on the State Register of Heritage Places and considered the most scenic part of the line.

=== Bridges ===
The line crosses a few notable bridges, with the curved 127-metre-long (417 ft), 10-metre-high (33 ft) Warren River Bridge being listed on the State Register of Heritage Places. Other notable bridges include:

- Preston River Bridge at Boyanup
- Balingup Brook Bridge at Balingup
- Blackwood River Bridge at Bridgetown
- Dombakup Bridge near Dombakup

In particular, the section from Pemberton to Northcliffe features seven bridges, six of which are within 10 kilometres (6.2 mi) south of Pemberton. Of those, three are within a 500-metre (1,600 ft) stretch of the line. The final bridge, over Dombakup Brook is a completely wooden trestle bridge, of which no examples are known to be still in use.

=== Branches ===
While the Bunbury–Picton section of the South Western Railway was part of the original line to Boyanup, it is now considered part of the mainline, with the Northcliffe branch connecting to it at Picton. The first junction en route is at Boyanup, where the Flinders Bay branch diverges to the west, providing access to the Nannup branch at Wonnerup. Further south at Donnybrook, the Donnybrook–Katanning branch provided a connection to the east.

==== Timber tramways ====
Several timber mills used to operate along the railway, each with their own access to the mainline. Many of these mills operated extensive timber tramways that fed significant quantities of timber to the railway. The section from Jardee to Pemberton was originally built as a State Saw Mills tramway, before being transferred to the WAGR 12 years later, in 1926.

== Operations ==
=== Passenger ===
The only passenger services on the line are operated by the Pemberton Tramway Company. This tourist service is currently limited to the section between Pemberton and The Cascades, operated by diesel trams. Previously, the company operated passenger services along its entire section of the line, with steam-hauled trains Pemberton-Lyall and diesel trams Pemberton-Northcliffe.

==== Stations ====
With the line largely disused and the only passenger services operating from Pemberton, most railway stations have disappeared. However, several towns have preserved their stations, potentially re-purposing them for other uses:

- Donnybrook
- Greenbushes
- Bridgetown
- Manjimup
- Pemberton

=== Freight ===
There are currently no freight services on the line, with only the first 3 kilometres (1.9 mi) in use as part of Picton Yard. However, it has been proposed that the line be rehabilitated and reopened between Picton and Greenbushes to carry lithium ore from the Talison Lithium mine near the town. It is hoped that the reopened line would support the carriage of other goods, such as mineral sands, agricultural produce and timber. In 2020, a high-level feasibility study into reopening the line was completed by the state government, Talison Lithium, and Arc Infrastructure, and a second joint Government-industry feasibility study commenced 2023 and is expected to be complete by late 2024. It was later clarified that a decision on reopening would be expected by mid-2025. In December 2025, the study concluded that it was not economically feasible to reopen the line due to the additional infrastructure required for the refurbishment. Arc Infrastructure stated they were disappointed in the outcome and hoped the project could proceed in some form in the future.

In January 2024, Rail Heritage WA attempted to use the portion of the line between Piction and Boyanup to transfer a retired Australind carriage to their Boyanup museum, but were unable to after Arc Infrastructure determined the section was unsafe for transporting.
