= Donnybrook, Western Australia =

Town in South West region of Western Australia

Donnybrook Minninup (Noongar)
- Town
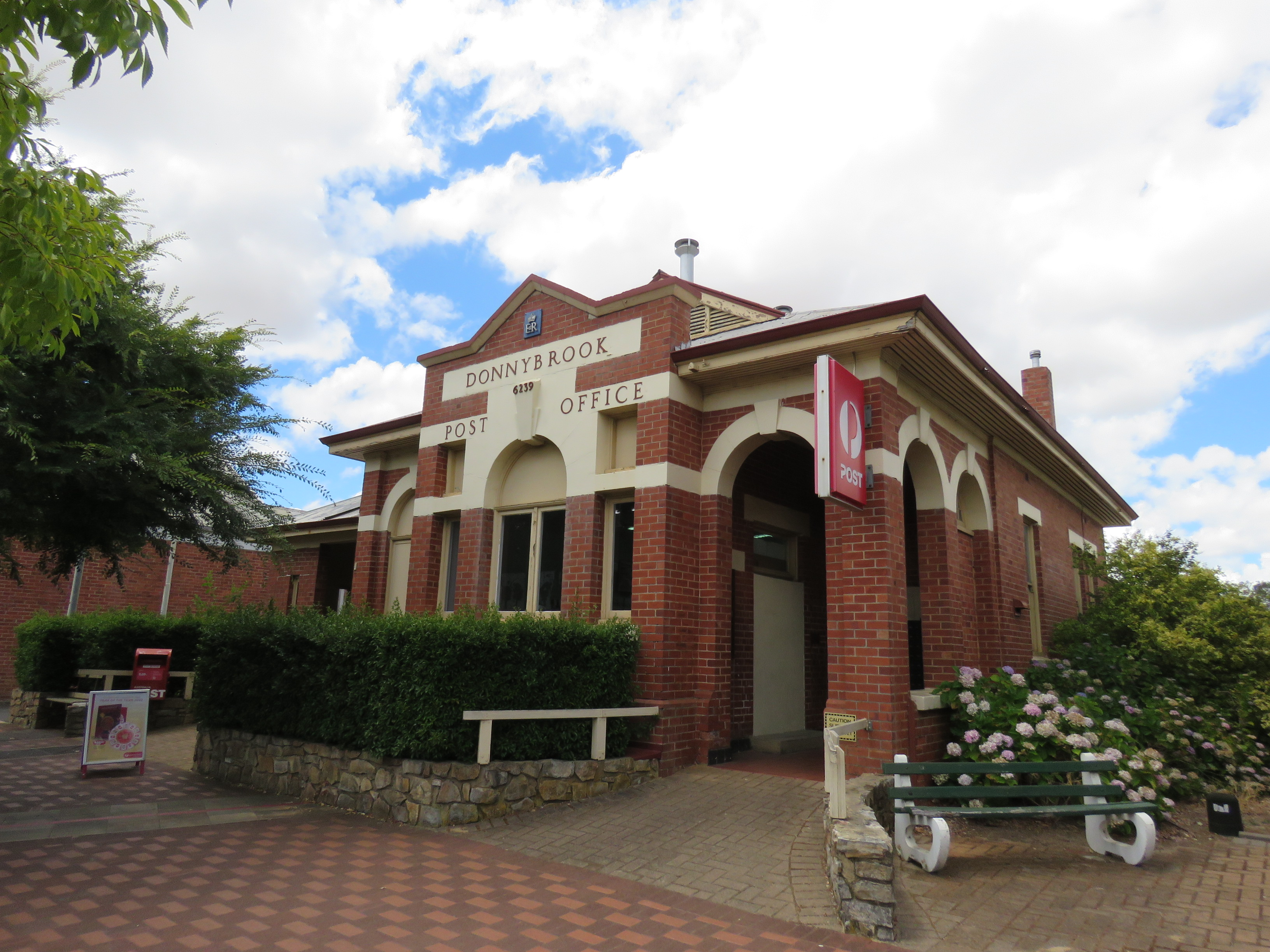
- The state heritage listed Donnybrook Post Office

- Interactive map of Donnybrook
- Coordinates: 33.58°S 115.82°E
- Country: Australia
- State: Western Australia
- LGA: Shire of Donnybrook-Balingup
- Location: 38 km (24 mi) from Bunbury
- Established: 1894

Government
  - State electorate: Collie-Preston
  - Federal division: Forrest

Area
  - Total: 25 km^{2} (9.7 sq mi)
- Elevation: 63 m (207 ft)

Population
  - Total: 2,786 (UCL 2021)
- Postcode: 6239
- Mean max temp: 23.1 °C (73.6 °F)
- Mean min temp: 9.8 °C (49.6 °F)
- Annual rainfall: 973.1 mm (38.31 in)
Localities around Donnybrook
Argyle	Crooked Brook	Beelerup
Argyle	Donnybrook	Beelerup
Paynedale	Paynedale	Upper Capel

Donnybrook is a town situated between Boyanup and Kirup on the South Western Highway, 210 kilometres (130 mi) south of Perth, Western Australia. The town is the centre of apple cultivation in Western Australia. The town is also known for its picturesque abundance of English oak trees, as well as for the Apple Fun Park, a large outdoor playground in the centre of town.

== History ==
Donnybrook is on the traditional lands of the Noongar people. George Nash and other Europeans arrived here around 1842. They named the place after their home town, Donnybrook, then a suburb of Dublin, Ireland. The eastern part of the town was formerly called Minninup. The western portion of the townsite is currently known as Irishtown. The town of Donnybrook was gazetted in 1894.

In 1897, Richard Hunter discovered gold about 6 kilometres (3.7 mi) south of the Donnybrook townsite. Hunter eventually sold out to Fred Camilleri (a well known prospector from Kalgoorlie) and Camilleri was able to interest the internationally renowned Polish geologist Modest Maryanski. It was on the basis of Maryanski's report that a new company, Donnybrook Goldfields, was floated on the London Stock Exchange in 1899. A mini-gold-rush occurred, resulting in the government gazetting the Donnybrook Goldfield – in the process making provision for a new town to be called Goldtown. From the census of 1901, it was known over 200 gold miners were camped on the goldfields. The excitement was short-lived however, and the Hunters Venture mine closed in August 1903. The area was worked during the Great Depression by locals Laurie and Foster Payne, then re-pegged and explored during the 1980s and again from 2004 to 2005.

== Geography ==
=== Climate ===
Donnybrook experiences a Mediterranean climate (Köppen climate classification Csa). Although summers are usually dry, heavy downpours in the summer are not uncommon. Donnybrook gets 93.9 clear days annually.

Climate data for Donnybrook
Month	Jan	Feb	Mar	Apr	May	Jun	Jul	Aug	Sep	Oct	Nov	Dec	Year
Record high °C (°F)	43.8 (110.8)	44.6 (112.3)	42.4 (108.3)	37.3 (99.1)	30.6 (87.1)	28.5 (83.3)	23.9 (75.0)	27.0 (80.6)	31.6 (88.9)	35.3 (95.5)	39.1 (102.4)	42.6 (108.7)	44.6 (112.3)
Mean daily maximum °C (°F)	30.6 (87.1)	30.5 (86.9)	28.0 (82.4)	24.1 (75.4)	20.0 (68.0)	17.5 (63.5)	16.5 (61.7)	17.3 (63.1)	18.8 (65.8)	21.2 (70.2)	24.9 (76.8)	28.2 (82.8)	23.1 (73.6)
Mean daily minimum °C (°F)	14.1 (57.4)	14.4 (57.9)	13.0 (55.4)	10.4 (50.7)	8.2 (46.8)	6.7 (44.1)	5.7 (42.3)	6.1 (43.0)	7.1 (44.8)	8.4 (47.1)	10.5 (50.9)	12.4 (54.3)	9.8 (49.6)
Record low °C (°F)	3.3 (37.9)	1.7 (35.1)	1.6 (34.9)	−0.2 (31.6)	−1.2 (29.8)	−2.5 (27.5)	−3.0 (26.6)	−2.6 (27.3)	−2.2 (28.0)	−0.5 (31.1)	0.4 (32.7)	1.7 (35.1)	−3.0 (26.6)
Average precipitation mm (inches)	12.7 (0.50)	14.9 (0.59)	25.1 (0.99)	49.6 (1.95)	134.4 (5.29)	187.1 (7.37)	186.8 (7.35)	148.9 (5.86)	102.3 (4.03)	62.9 (2.48)	32.8 (1.29)	16.5 (0.65)	973.1 (38.31)
Average precipitation days	3.2	3.2	4.7	8.7	15.0	18.5	21.0	19.4	16.2	12.4	7.9	4.6	134.8
Average afternoon relative humidity (%) (at 1500)	35	36	39	47	57	64	63	59	56	50	42	37	49
Source: Australian Bureau of Meteorology

== Industry ==
Donnybrook is the home of Western Australia's apple industry. In 1900, the first Granny Smith apple tree was planted, and the apple orchard industry grew after World War I.

Apples are harvested between March and May, with apple blossoms prominent in October. Donnybrook's industries also include timber, beef, dairy and viticulture. Many visiting backpackers earn money picking fruit from orchards in the area between November and June. Many apple trees are being replaced with avocado trees.

== Tourism ==
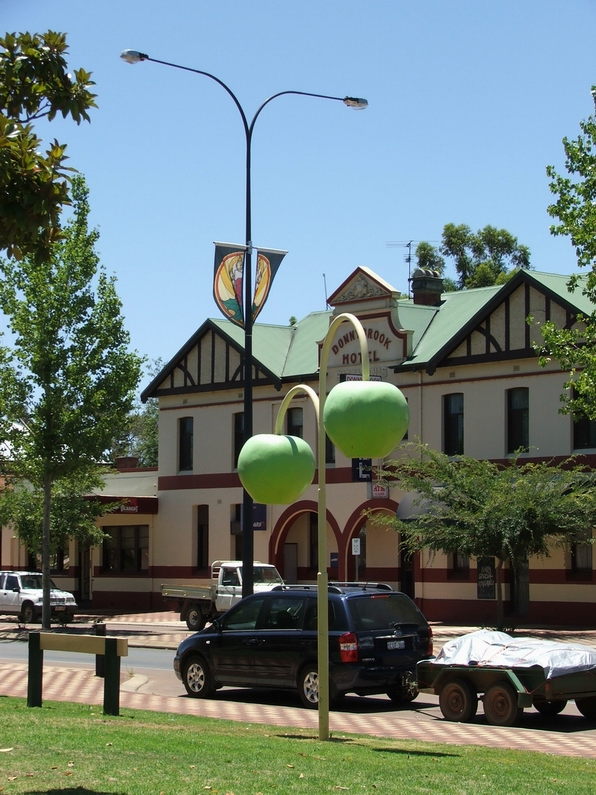
Apple decorations along Donnybrook's main street

Donnybrook has many structures bearing apple representations. On the main street, apple-shaped lights line the entrance of the Old Railway Station. These lights have recently been restored. Atop the east Donnybrook hill is a 20-metre-high (66 ft) tower with an apple at the top. The apple is part of the Big Apple Farmstay (formerly the Big Apple Tourist and Wildlife Park). From the top of the apple, farmstay guests can view Donnybrook and its surrounding areas. The Lady Williams big apple is made of fibreglass and is 7.5 metres (25 ft) tall with a diameter of 6.5 metres (21 ft), making it one of Australia's "Big Things".

=== Apple festival ===
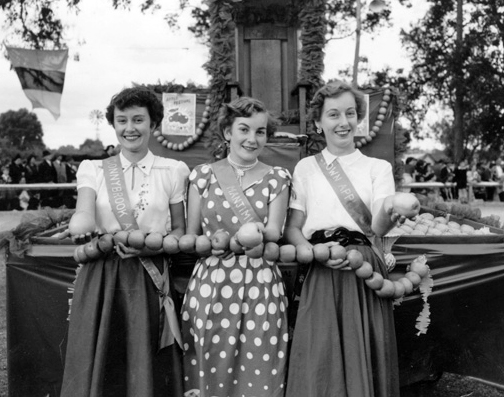
Finalists in the 1954 Apple Queen competition from Donnybrook, Manjimup and Bridgetown

The Donnybrook Apple Festival is held every year during Easter. During the apple festival, the citizens of Donnybrook gather at Egan Park to celebrate the apple. The festival includes agricultural displays, a sideshow alley, a Saturday evening concert and fireworks display and a street parade. During the street parade the Catholic church in Donnybrook blesses the holy apple, assuring a good harvest in the years to come.

The Apple Festival also had a mascot called Donny Applebrook, created in 1997. Donny was a giant green apple who promoted the festival.

=== Apple Fun Park playground ===
The centre of town is home to the Apple Fun Park outdoor playground, which opened in Easter 2008 in time for the Donnybrook Apple Festival that year. The expansive fruit-themed park contains children's play equipment (including an 8-metre-high or 26-foot tower, swing sets, trampolines, multiple slides and a flying fox), an adult exercise area, as well as a shaded picnic area with public barbecues. At the time of its construction it was the largest free-entry playground in Australia, and it attracts up to 50,000 visitors each year. The playground helped inject over A$6 million into the local economy over the first 13 years of its existence, and its success has inspired the construction of similar playgrounds in the region.

In April 2021 the playground was temporarily closed for revitalisation works with much of the play equipment demolished as it had reached the end of its design life. The playground reopened in October 2021 with a larger, updated design, new lighting and expanded shading and greenspaces, and new play equipment and activities (though some original play equipment was also retained).

=== English oak ===
Donnybrook is home to Australia's largest known English oak. The tree, believed to originate from 1893 is a landmark within the town. There is a time capsule under this tree.

== Railway ==
The Donnybrook–Katanning railway was a railway line that connected the communities of Donnybrook to Mumballup, Noggerup, Boyup Brook, Kojonup and Katanning.

== See also ==
- Donnybrook stone
