= Wardandi =

Aboriginal people of Western Australia

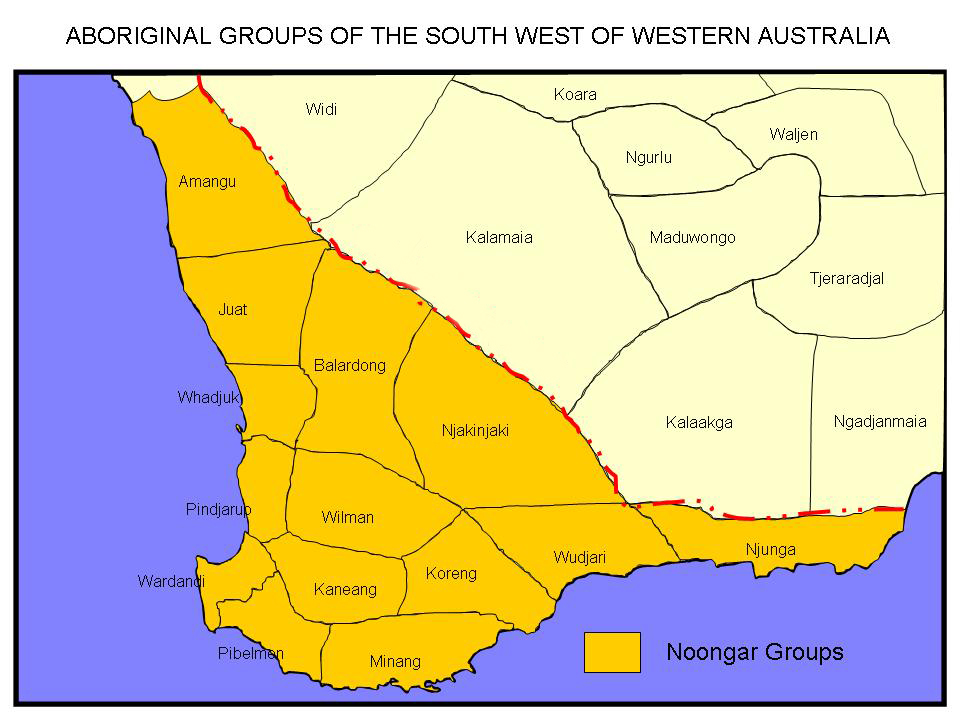
Noongar language groups

The Wadandi, also spelt Wardandi and other variants, are an Aboriginal people of south-western Western Australia, one of fourteen language groups of the Noongar peoples.

== Name ==
There are at least three theories about the meaning of the tribal ethnonym. One informant suggested it reflected a word for "crow" (wardan), a theory that sits poorly with early word lists that state that the Wardandi word for that bird is kwa:kum. A second view argues for the sense of "seacoast people"; one source in support of this cites a word variously given as waatu or waatern with the meaning "the ocean". A third hypothesis has it that the name is derived from the word for "no".

== Country ==
Wadandi traditional country covers an estimated 1,800 square miles (4,700 km^{2}). Predominantly coastal, it encompasses Busselton and the areas from Bunbury to Cape Leeuwin and Geographe Bay. Inland it reaches the area around Nannup.

They were the sole inhabitants of the area for an estimated 45,000 years before the arrival of British colonial settlers at Augusta in 1830, and are one of fourteen language groups of the Bibbulmun (Noongar) peoples.

== Language ==
The Wadandi people speak a variety of the Doonan and Dwordan dialects continuum known as Wadandi.

== Archaeological site ==
Wadandi traditional owners guided archaeological researchers to a spot on a granite outcrop near Flinders Bay in Augusta which was excavated and reported on in 2021, revealing grooves and other signs that people ground stones to make tools here around 9,700 years ago.

== Alternative names and spellings ==
- Waddarndi, Wadarndee, Wardandie, Wardandi
- Wadjandi
- Belliman
- Geographe Bay and Vasse tribe
- Bunbury tribe
- Kardagur ("between" (the two seas))
- Dardanup (toponym)
- Dordenup
- Dunanwongi (language name)
- Doonin
- Dornderupwongy
- Jabaru ("north" among northern tribes)
- Yabaroo
- Wadandi
- Nghungar (njunga is an eastern tribe word for "man".)

== Sources ==
- "AIATSIS map of Indigenous Australia". AIATSIS. 3 June 2015.
- "Tindale Tribal Boundaries" (PDF). Department of Aboriginal Affairs, Western Australia. September 2016. Archived from the original (PDF) on 8 March 2016.
- Hackett, Deborah Vernon (1958). An Attempt to Eat the Moon : and other stories recounted from the Aborigines. Melbourne: Georgian House.
- Bates, D. M. (1905). Marriage laws and some customs of the West Australian aborigines. Vol. 23. Melbourne: Transactions of the Royal Geographical Society of Australasia. pp. 37–60.
- Bates, D. M. (January–June 1914). "A Few Notes on Some South-Western Australian Dialects". Journal of the Royal Anthropological Institute of Great Britain and Ireland. 44: 65–82. doi:10.2307/2843531. JSTOR 2843531.
- Tindale, Norman Barnett (1974). "Wardandi". Aboriginal Tribes of Australia: Their Terrain, Environmental Controls, Distribution, Limits, and Proper Names. Australian National University Press. ISBN 978-0-708-10741-6. Archived from the original on 20 March 2020.
