= Darradup, Western Australia =

Locality in the Shire of Nannup, Western Australia

Darradup
- other
- Coordinates: 34.10°S 115.55°E
- Country: Australia
- State: Western Australia
- LGA: Shire of Nannup
- Location: 239 km (149 mi) from Perth; 53 km (33 mi) from Busselton; 22 km (14 mi) from Nannup

Government
  - State electorate: Warren-Blackwood
  - Federal division: O'Connor

Area
  - Total: 321.2 km^{2} (124.0 sq mi)

Population
  - Total: 41 (SAL 2021)
- Postcode: 6275
Localities around Darradup
Schroeder	Jalbarragup	Jalbarragup
Schroeder	Darradup	Carlotta
Scott River East	Scott River East	Biddelia

Darradup is a rural locality of the Shire of Nannup in the South West region of Western Australia. The Brockman Highway runs through the centre of the locality while, to the east of it, the Milyeannup National Park makes up the south-eastern part of Darradup. The Blackwood River runs through the locality from east to west and the Blackwood River National Park stretches along it while the far northern part of Darradup is taken up by the Wiltshire-Butler National Park.

It is located on the traditional land of the Noongar nation.

The locality is home to two heritage-listed buildings, Darradup House and Darradup School. The original building of Darradup House dates back to 1868, but was thought to have been demolished in 1951 after storm damage, and a new house constructed. Later investigations however established that at least some of the existing structure dates back to before 1900. Daradup School is located south of the house, on the southern side of the Blackwood River, and dates to 1900.
