= Jasper (disambiguation) =

Jasper is an opaque mineral.

Jasper or Jaspers may also refer to:

== People and fictional characters ==
- Jasper (given name)
- Jasper (surname)

== Places ==
=== Australia ===
- Lake Jasper, a permanent freshwater lake in Western Australia

=== Canada ===
- Jasper National Park in Alberta's Rockies
- Jasper, Alberta, a specialized municipality
  - Jasper station, a Canadian National Railway station

=== United States ===
- Jasper, Alabama, a city
- Jasper, Arkansas, a city
- Jasper, Florida, a city
- Jasper, Georgia, a city
- Jasper, Indiana, a city
- Jasper, Michigan, a census-designated place
- Jasper, Minnesota, a city
- Jasper, Missouri, a city
- Jasper, New York, a town
- Jasper, Ohio, an unincorporated community
- Jasper, Oregon, an unincorporated community
- Jasper, Tennessee, a town
- Jasper, Texas, a city
- Jasper, Virginia, an unincorporated community
- Jasper County (disambiguation)
- Jasper Creek (disambiguation)
- Jasper Township (disambiguation)
- Mount Jasper, a mountain in Colorado

== Computing ==
- JasPer, a project to create an open-source implementation of the JPEG-2000 codec
- Tomcat Jasper, a software engine used by Apache Tomcat for JavaServer Pages
- Jasper, 2008 hardware revision of Microsoft's Xbox 360 video game console
- Jasper Technologies, an American corporation that provides a cloud-based software platform for the Internet of Things
- Jasper Design Automation, an electronic design automation company, now part of Cadence Design Systems
- JasperReports, an open source Java reporting library

== Music ==
- "Jasper", a 1976 Jim Stafford song
- "Jasper", a 2008 song by Kaela Kimura from +1
- JASP.ER, a Thai boy band under Riser Music

== Other uses ==
- Cyclone Jasper, a tropical cyclone in Australia (2023)
- HMS Jasper, six ships of the Royal Navy
- Jasper High School (disambiguation), various American schools
- Jasper (San Francisco), a residential skyscraper
- Jasper ware, a type of fine pottery developed by Josiah Wedgwood
- Joint Actinide Shock Physics Experimental Research
- Jasper United, a Nigerian former football club based in the city of Onitsha
- A colloquial name for the common wasp in southern England and the English Midlands
- Jasper Ocean Terminal, a planned deepwater container port in South Carolina
- Manhattan Jaspers, the nicknames of the Manhattan College sports teams
- Jasper (film), a 2022 Indian Tamil-language drama film

== See also ==
- Jaspers (disambiguation)
- Jasper Lake (disambiguation)
