= Carlotta, Western Australia =

Locality in the Shire of Nannup, Western Australia

Carlotta
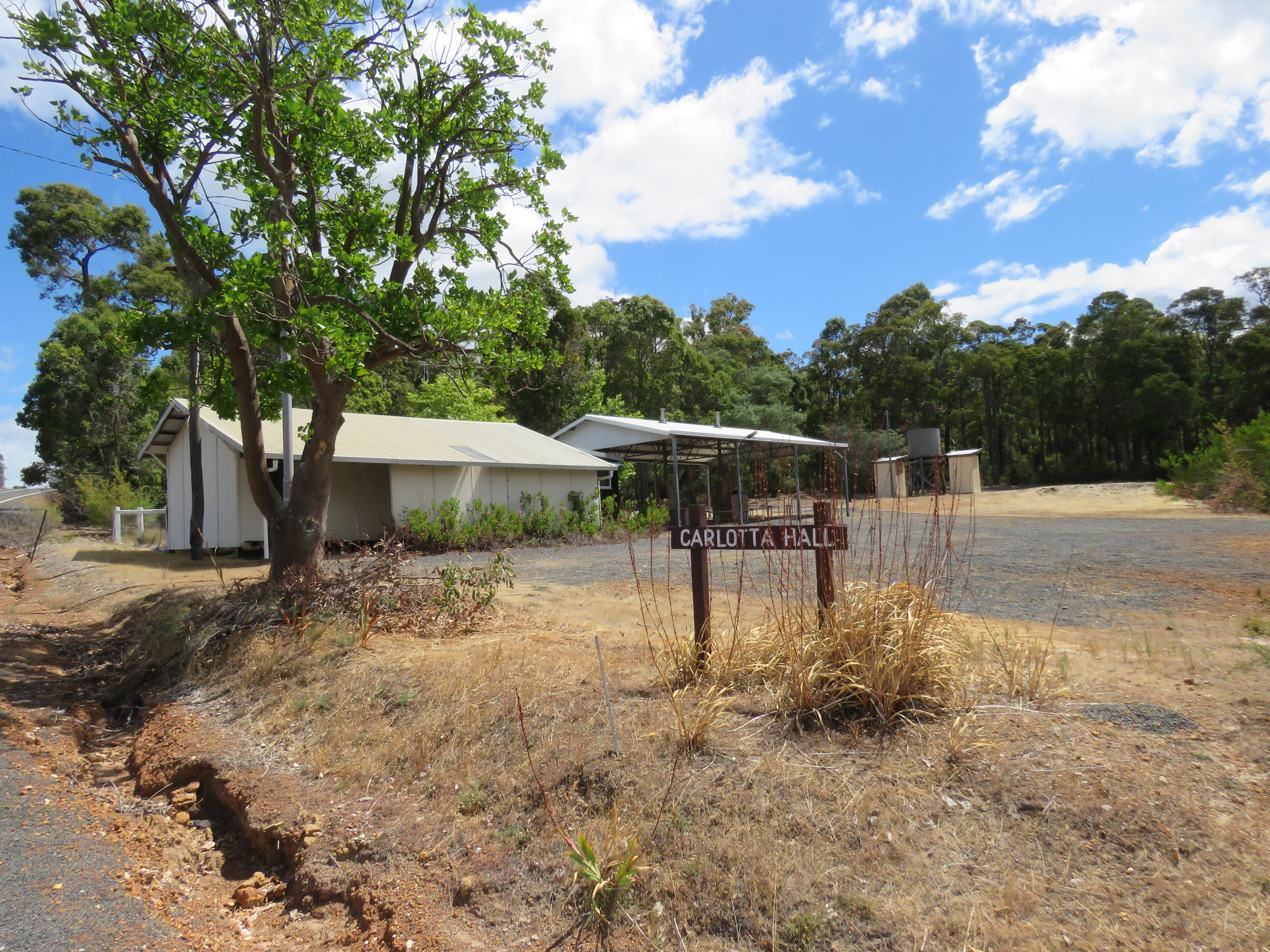
- Carlotta Hall
- Interactive map of Carlotta
- Coordinates: 34.13°S 115.80°E
- Country: Australia
- State: Western Australia
- LGA: Shire of Nannup
- Location: 238 km (148 mi) from Perth; 63 km (39 mi) from Busselton; 13 km (8.1 mi) from Nannup

Government
  - State electorate: Warren-Blackwood
  - Federal division: O'Connor

Area
  - Total: 364.7 km^{2} (140.8 sq mi)

Population
  - Total: 103 (SAL 2021)
- Postcode: 6275
Localities around Carlotta
Jalbarragup	Nannup	East Nannup
Darradup	Carlotta	Glenoran
Darradup	Biddelia	Peerabeelup

Carlotta is a rural locality of the Shire of Nannup in the South West region of Western Australia. The Vasse Highway runs through the centre of the locality, with the Easter National Park stretching along the east side of the highway. The south-western part of the locality is taken up by the Milyeannup National Park while the remainder is predominantly covered by state forest. Its north-western boundary is made up by the Brockman Highway and Nannup Airport is located in the north-west as well, inside the Kearney State Forest.

It is located on the traditional land of the Noongar nation.

The historic Jangardup Stock Route runs through the locality on the route that is now the Vasse Highway. It was last used as a stock route in the mid-1960s.
