= Jalbarragup, Western Australia =

Locality in the Shire of Nannup, Western Australia

Jalbarragup
- other
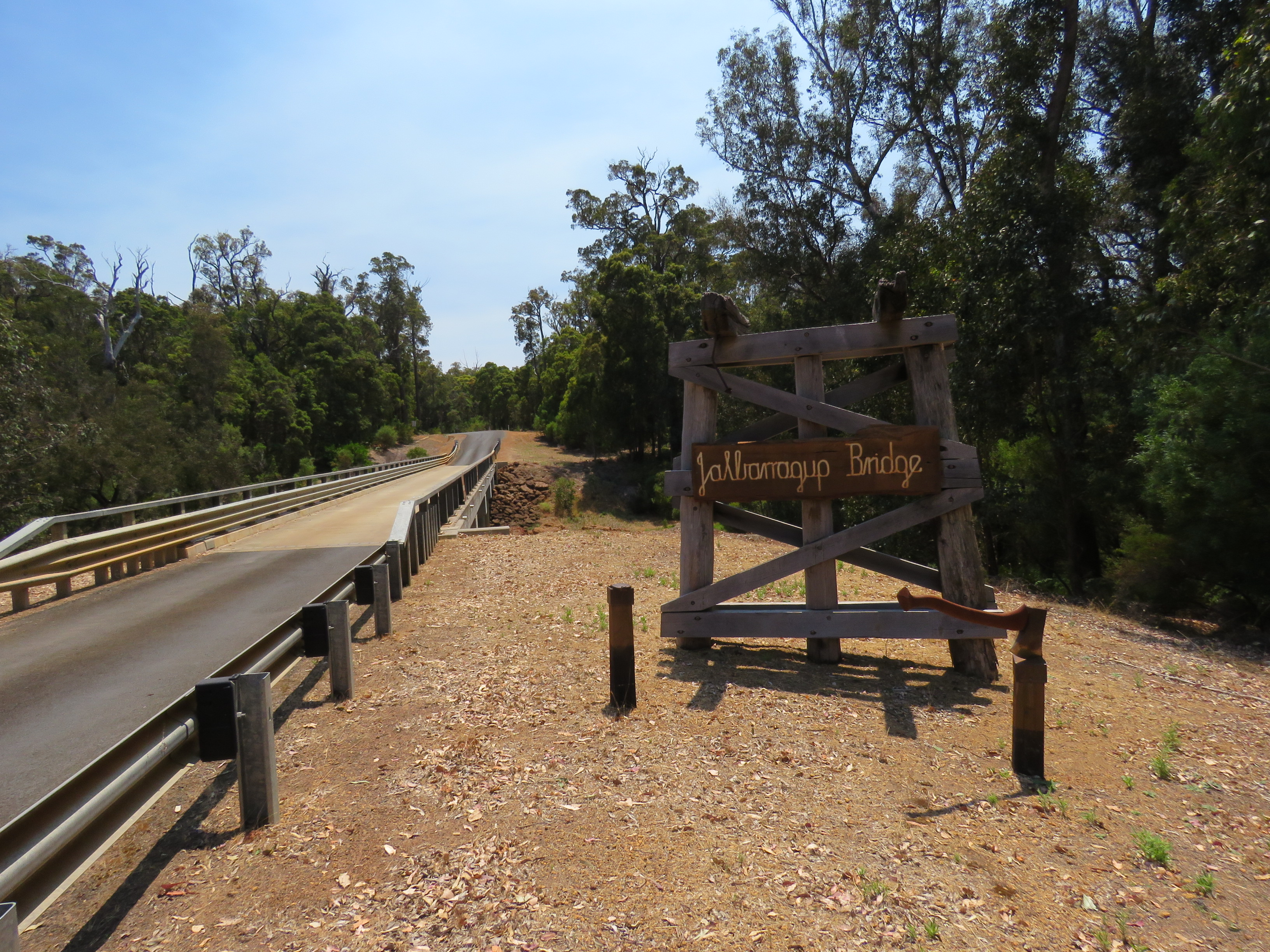
- Site of the state heritage listed former Jalbarragup Bridge
- Coordinates: 34.01°S 115.63°E
- Country: Australia
- State: Western Australia
- LGA: Shire of Nannup
- Location: 233 km (145 mi) from Perth; 49 km (30 mi) from Busselton; 16 km (9.9 mi) from Nannup

Government
  - State electorate: Warren-Blackwood
  - Federal division: O'Connor

Area
  - Total: 264.6 km^{2} (102.2 sq mi)

Population
  - Total: 163 (SAL 2021)
- Postcode: 6275
Localities around Jalbarragup
Baudin	Barrabup	Barrabup
Schroeder	Jalbarragup	Nannup
Schroeder	Darradup	Carlotta

Jalbarragup is a rural locality of the Shire of Nannup in the South West region of Western Australia. The Brockman Highway and the Blackwood River run through the locality from north-east to south-west. The eastern-most section of the Wiltshire-Butler National Park stretches into the west of Jalbarragup, as does a small northern section of the Milyeannup National Park at the southern boundary of the locality. Much of the remainder is covered by state forest.

It is located on the traditional land of the Noongar nation.

The site of the state heritage listed Jalbarragup Bridge lies within the locality. The wooden bridge was constructed in 1900 and in use until 1988, and was the last of its kind in use on the Blackwood River. The bridge has now been replaced by a modern construction at the same site.

== See also ==
- Jalbarragup Important Bird Area
