= Biddelia, Western Australia =

Locality in the Shire of Nannup, Western Australia

Biddelia
- other
- Coordinates: 34.24°S 115.74°E
- Country: Australia
- State: Western Australia
- LGA: Shire of Nannup
- Location: 254 km (158 mi) from Perth; 74 km (46 mi) from Busselton; 27 km (17 mi) from Nannup

Government
  - State electorate: Warren-Blackwood
  - Federal division: O'Connor

Area
  - Total: 163.2 km^{2} (63.0 sq mi)

Population
  - Total: 20 (SAL 2021)
- Postcode: 6260
Localities around Biddelia
Darradup	Carlotta	Carlotta
Scott River East	Biddelia	Peerabeelup
Scott River East	Peerabeelup	Peerabeelup

Biddelia is a rural locality of the Shire of Nannup in the South West region of Western Australia. The Vasse Highway runs north–south through the centre of the locality and the area west of the highway is almost completely made up of the Hilliger National Park while the Easter National Park lies along and east of the highway within Biddelia. Most of the remainder is covered by state forest.

It is located on the traditional land of the Noongar nation.

The locality is home to the heritage listed Biddelia homestead, which dates back to 1876, built by the Dickson family who settled in the area in 1854.
