= East Nannup, Western Australia =

Locality in the Shire of Nannup, Western Australia

East Nannup
- other
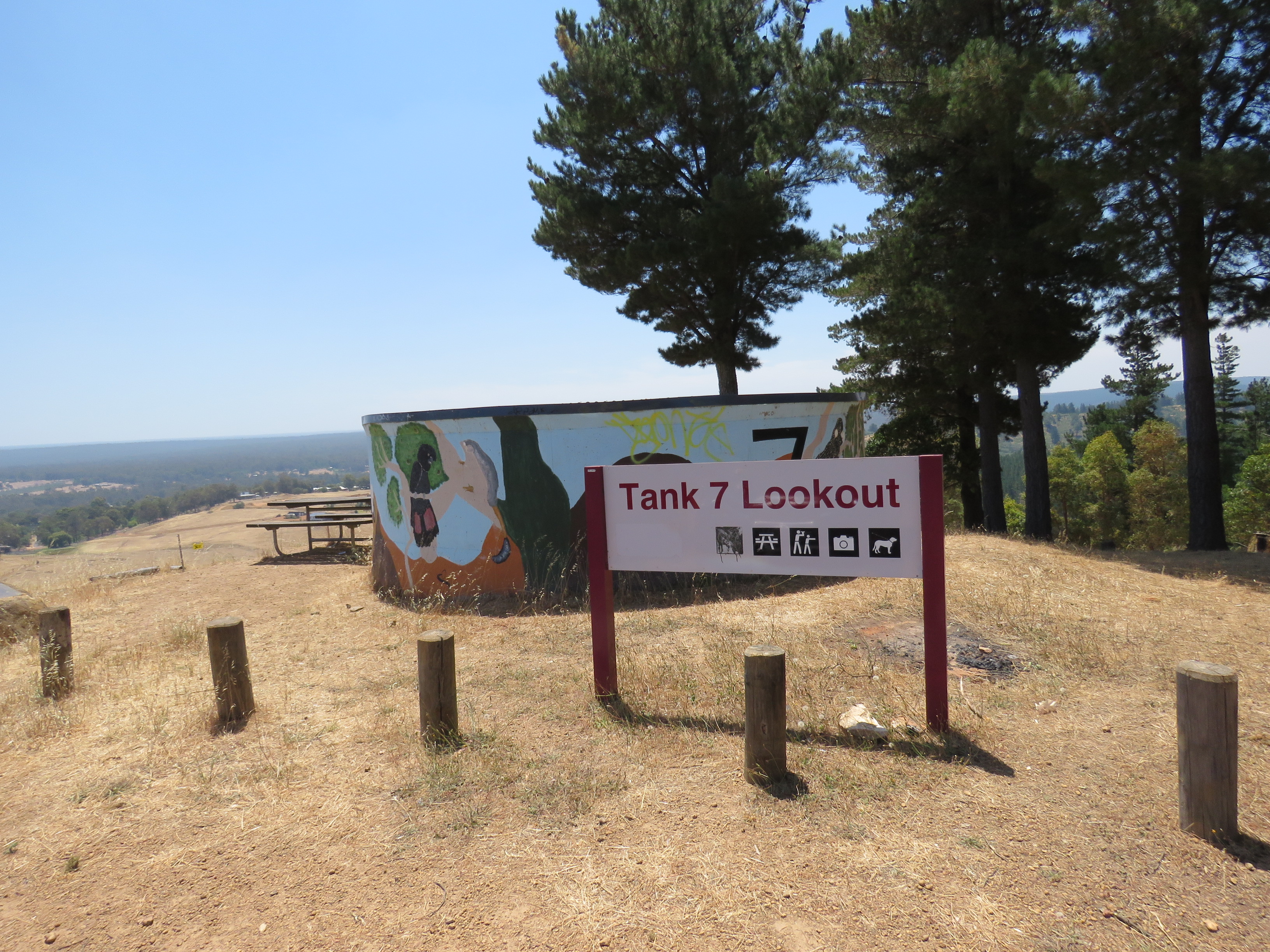
- Tank 7 lookout, the starting point for many mountain bike trails in the area
- Coordinates: 34.03°S 115.85°E
- Country: Australia
- State: Western Australia
- LGA: Shire of Nannup
- Location: 230 km (140 mi) from Perth; 59 km (37 mi) from Busselton; 6 km (3.7 mi) from Nannup

Government
  - State electorate: Warren-Blackwood
  - Federal division: O'Connor

Area
  - Total: 104.9 km^{2} (40.5 sq mi)

Population
  - Total: 43 (SAL 2021)
- Postcode: 6275
Localities around East Nannup
Nannup	Nannup	Nannup
Carlotta	East Nannup	Donnelly River
Carlotta	Carlotta	Donnelly River

East Nannup is a rural locality of the Shire of Nannup in the South West region of Western Australia. The Brockman Highway forms the northern boundary of the locality along its entire length. The western part of East Nannup is a mixture of farmland and forest while the eastern part is completely forested.

It is located on the traditional land of the Noongar nation.

The historic Linden homestead is located in the west of East Nannup and dates back to 1880. The current building dates to 1909 and was extended in 1915 but the jarrah slabs of the original homestead are still in use as the floor of the shearing shed.

The heritage-listed Willow Springs Timber Mill and town site is located at the point where the localities of East Nannup, Donnelly River and Carlotta meet. The mill, operated by the Kauri Timber Company, was destroyed by fire in February 1947. The mill and its production of fruit crates were completely destroyed but the near-by offices and workers cottages survived the fire.
