= Scott River East, Western Australia =

Locality in the Shire of Nannup, Western Australia

Scott River East
- other
- Coordinates: 34.26°S 115.49°E
- Country: Australia
- State: Western Australia
- LGA(s): Shire of Nannup
- Location: 258 km (160 mi) from Perth; 72 km (45 mi) from Busselton; 35 km (22 mi) from Nannup

Government
  - State electorate(s): Warren-Blackwood
  - Federal division(s): O'Connor

Area
  - Total: 563.7 km^{2} (217.6 sq mi)

Population
  - Total(s): 68 (SAL 2021)
- Postcode: 6275
Localities around Scott River East
Schroeder	Darradup	Biddelia
Peerabeelup	Scott River East	Lake Jasper
Scott River	Southern Ocean

Scott River East is a rural locality of the Shire of Nannup in the South West region of Western Australia, located along the Scott River and on the Southern Ocean coast. The eastern part of the locality is covered by Hilliger National Park while a small section of the western-most part of D'Entrecasteaux National Park also extends into it. Apart from those two national parks, it is also home to a number of nature reserves. Parts of the locality are also taken up by agriculture, among them the large dairy farms of Lactanz 2 and 3, while Lactanz 1 and 4 are in the neighbouring locality of Lake Jasper. Lactanz Dairy was Western Australia's largest dairy producer when it was sold for A$30 million in 2016 to Australian Agribusiness Group.

Scott River East is located on the traditional land of the Noongar nation.
