= Jalbarragup =

Jalbarragup may refer to:

- Jalbarragup Important Bird Area
- Jalbarragup, Western Australia, a locality in the Shire of Nannup
