= Barrabup, Western Australia =

Locality in the Shire of Nannup, Western Australia

Barrabup
- other
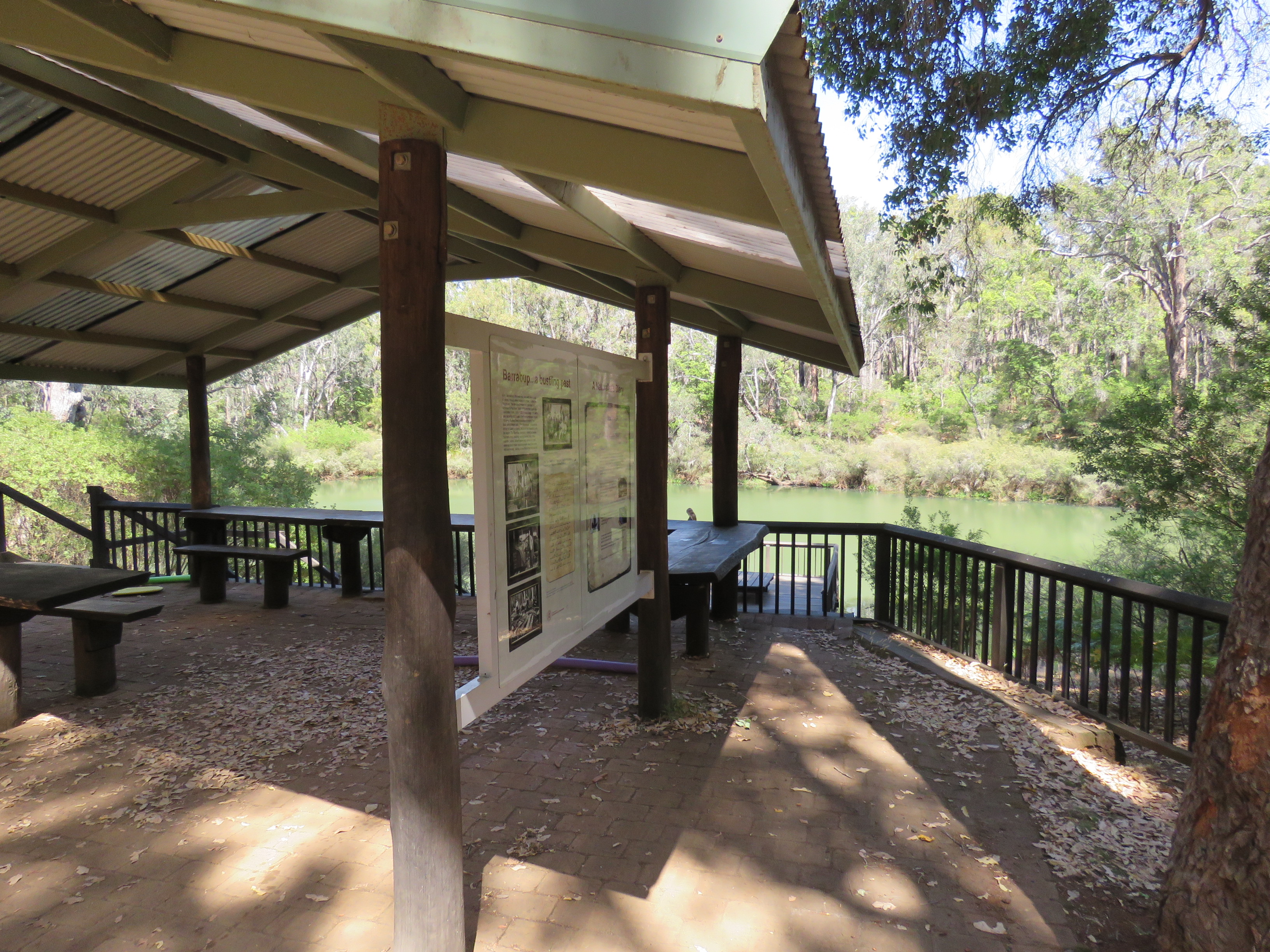
- Barrabup pool in January 2023
- Coordinates: 33.90°S 115.67°E
- Country: Australia
- State: Western Australia
- LGA: Shire of Nannup
- Location: 215 km (134 mi) from Perth; 64 km (40 mi) from Bunbury; 13 km (8.1 mi) from Nannup

Government
  - State electorate: Warren-Blackwood
  - Federal division: O'Connor

Area
  - Total: 201 km^{2} (78 sq mi)

Population
  - Total: 47 (SAL 2021)
- Postcode: 6275
Localities around Barrabup
Baudin	Yoganup	Cundinup
Barrabup	Barrabup	Cundinup
Jalbarragup	Nannup	Nannup

Barrabup is a rural locality of the Shire of Nannup in the South West region of Western Australia. The eastern boundary of the locality is formed by the Vasse Highway, with much of the locality being covered by state forest.

== History ==
Barrabup is located on the traditional land of the Noongar nation.

Within the locality of Barrabup, the townsite of Quigup was surveyed in 1909 and gazetted in 1911. The town was to accommodate the employees of the new Bartman & Son's sawmill in the area and was originally to be named St Johns Brook, but this name was deemed not suitable as it was already in use somewhere else in Australia. Instead, Quigup was chosen, which is an Aboriginal name of unknown meaning. The townsite, in the south-western corner of the locality, is now completely covered by forest and no buildings exist within its boundaries.

Barrabup was once a siding on the Nannup branch railway, originally opened as St Johns Brook in 1909 and quickly renamed to Barrabup in the same year. In 1915, the siding was renamed once more, now to Cambray, and remained under this name until closed in 1984, along with the rest of the line. Cambray siding is now a campsite on the Munda Biddi Trail, while the remnants of the railway bridge over the St Johns Brook are on the heritage list.

Some of the former railway line in the locality has been converted to cycling trails, which include Barrabup Pool and form the Old Timberline and Sidings Rail Trails.
