= Jaspers =

Jaspers is a Dutch patronymic surname (Jasper's). Notable people with the surname include:

- Dick Jaspers (born 1965), Dutch carom billiards player
- Eddy Jaspers (born 1956), Belgian football defender
- Karl Jaspers (1883–1969), German-Swiss psychiatrist and philosopher
- Jappe Jaspers (born 1998), Belgian cyclo-cross cyclist
- Jason Jaspers (born 1981), Canadian ice hockey centre
- John Baptist Jaspers (died 1691), Flemish painter and tapestry designer
- Martijn Jaspers (born 1987), Dutch BMX rider
- Michel Jaspers (born 1935), Belgian architect
- Stijn Jaspers (1961–1984), Dutch middle and long-distance runner
- Yvon Jaspers (born 1973), Dutch television presenter

== See also ==
- 48435 Jaspers, main-belt asteroid named for Karl Jaspers
- Jaspers, psychoactive food additive from Frank Herbert's novel The Santaroga Barrier, named for Karl Jaspers
- Jasper (disambiguation)
- Manhattan Jaspers and Lady Jaspers, the nicknames of the Manhattan University sports teams
- Jaspers Lai (born 1987), Malaysian actor
- Jasper White (chef), founder of the former Boston restaurant Jasper's
