= Jasper Lake =

Jasper Lake or Lake Jasper may refer to:

- Lake Jasper, Western Australia, a locality in the Shire of Nannup
  - Lake Jasper, a lake within the locality of Lake Jasper
- Jasper Lake (Alberta), a lake located in the Rockies of Jasper National Park, Canada
- Tremont (microarchitecture), a CPU microarchitecture including the Jasper Lake platform
