= Jaspert =

Jaspert is a surname. Notable people with the surname include:

- Augustus Jaspert (born 1979), British diplomat
- Robert Jaspert (born 1960), German football coach

== See also ==
- Jasper (surname)
