= Leucopogon incisus =

Conservation status
- Priority Two — Poorly Known Taxa (DEC)

Scientific classification
- Kingdom: Plantae
- Clade: Tracheophytes
- Clade: Angiosperms
- Clade: Eudicots
- Clade: Asterids
- Order: Ericales
- Family: Ericaceae
- Genus: Leucopogon
- Species: L. incisus

Binomial name
- Leucopogon incisus Hislop
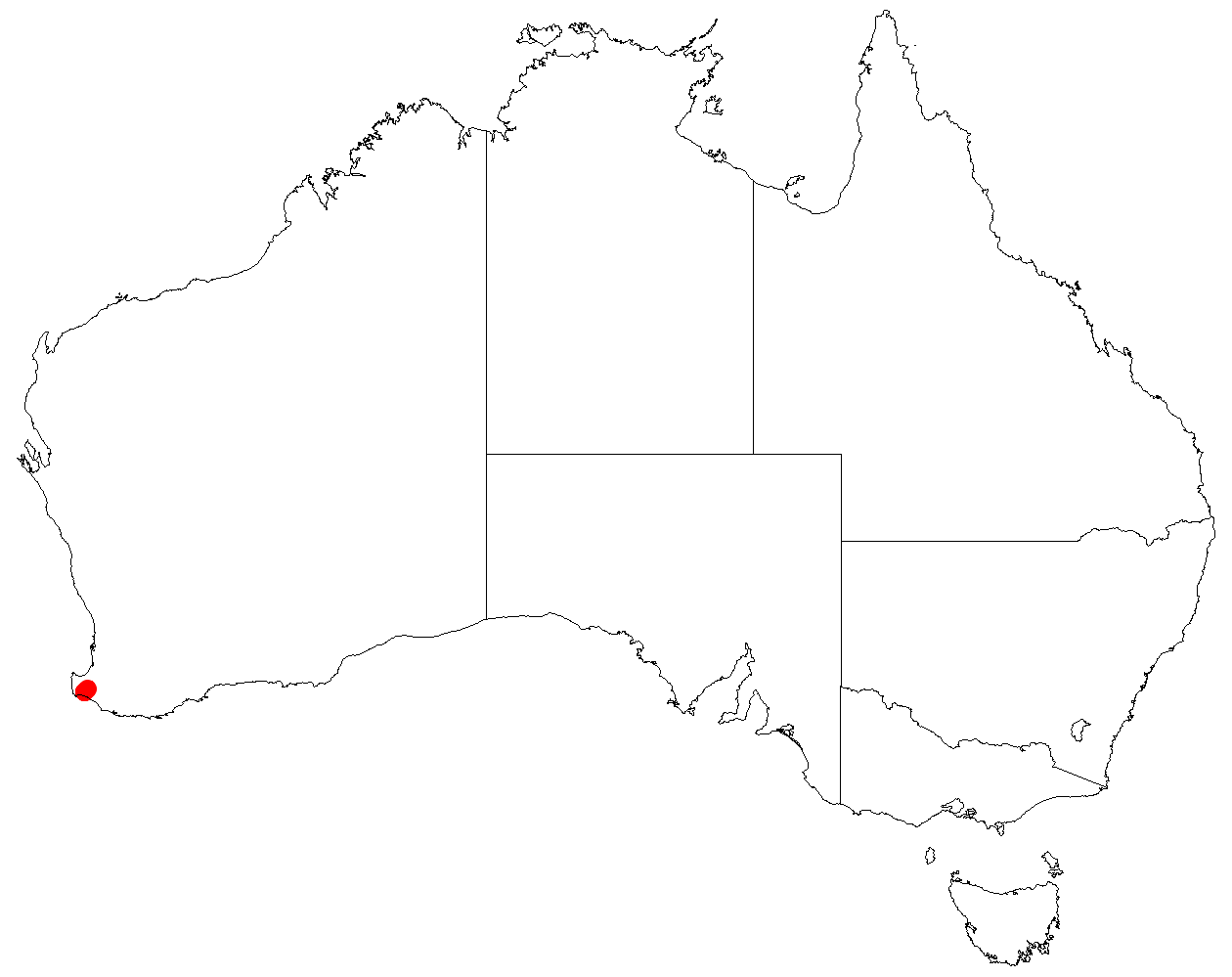
- Occurrence data from AVH

Species of plant

Leucopogon incisus is a species of flowering plant in the heath family Ericaceae and is endemic to a small area in the far south of the south-west of Western Australia. It is a delicate, erect or sprawling shrub with glabrous young branchlets, spirally arranged, erect, narrowly egg-shaped to narrowly elliptic leaves, and white or pale pink, narrowly bell-shaped to more or less cylindrical flowers.

== Description ==
Leucopogon incisus is a delicate, erect to sprawling shrub that typically grows up to about 40 cm (16 in) high and 60 cm (24 in) wide with a single stem at the base and glabrous young branchlets. The leaves are spirally arranged and point upwards, narrowly egg-shaped to narrowly elliptic, 3.0–7.5 mm (0.12–0.30 in) long and 0.7–1.3 mm (0.028–0.051 in) wide on an indistinct petiole. The flowers are arranged in groups of 2 to 7, 1.5–4 mm (0.059–0.157 in) long on the ends of branches and in upper leaf axils, with narrowly egg-shaped bracts and similar bracteoles 0.8–1.0 mm (0.031–0.039 in) long. The sepals are narrowly egg-shaped, 1.5–2.0 mm (0.059–0.079 in) long, the petals white or pale pink and joined at the base to form a narrowly bell-shaped to more or less cylindrical tube 1.4–1.8 mm (0.055–0.071 in) long, the lobes 1.2–1.5 mm (0.047–0.059 in) long. Flowering mainly occurs in September and October and the fruit is a flattened, elliptic drupe 1.8–2.3 mm (0.071–0.091 in) long.

== Taxonomy and naming ==
Leucopogon incisus was first formally described in 2015 by Michael Clyde Hislop in the journal Nuytsia from specimens he collected in the Blackwood River National Park in 2014. The specific epithet (incisus) means "cut deeply and sharply", referring to the deeply notched tip of the fruit.

== Distribution and habitat ==
This leucopogon is only known from a small area of jarrah woodland where it grows in winter-wet sandy soil in the far south of the Jarrah Forest bioregion of south-western Western Australia.

== Conservation status ==
Leucopogon incisus is listed as "Priority Two" by the Western Australian Government Department of Biodiversity, Conservation and Attractions, meaning that it is poorly known and from only one or a few locations.
