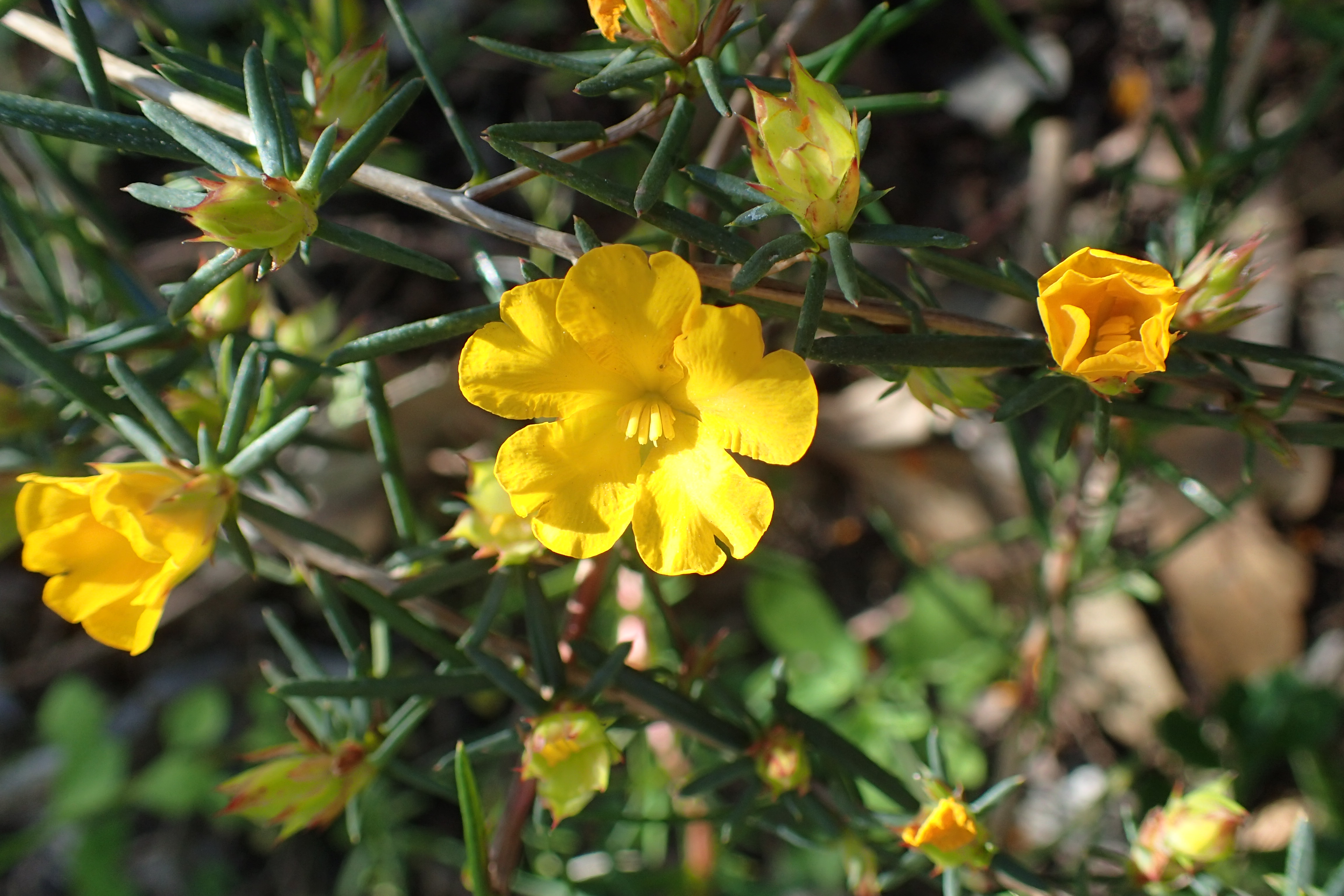

Scientific classification
- Kingdom: Plantae
- Clade: Tracheophytes
- Clade: Angiosperms
- Clade: Eudicots
- Order: Dilleniales
- Family: Dilleniaceae
- Genus: Hibbertia
- Species: H. aurea

Binomial name
- Hibbertia aurea Steud.

Synonyms
- Hibbertia aurea Steud. var. aurea

= Hibbertia aurea =

Species of flowering plant

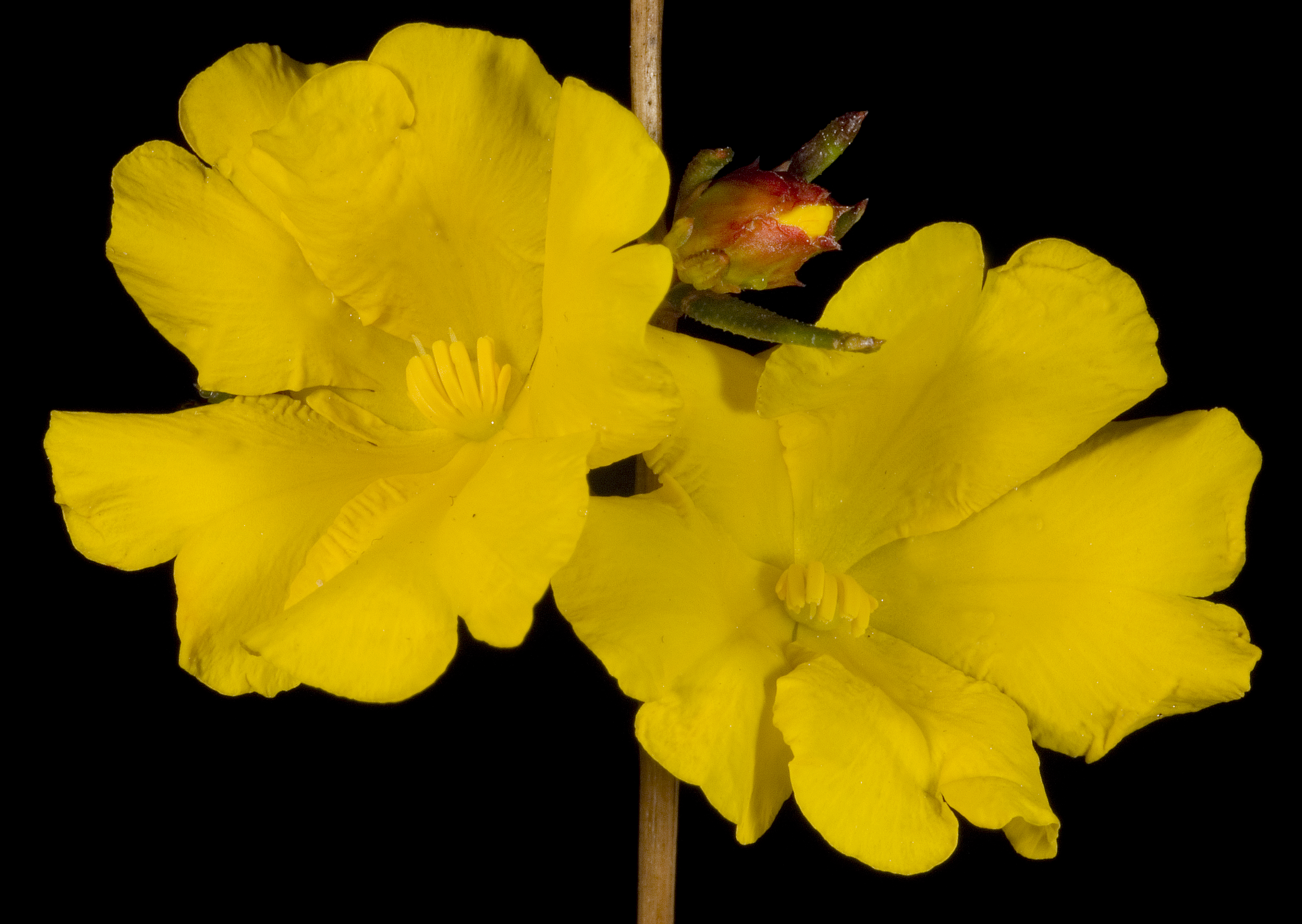
Flower detail

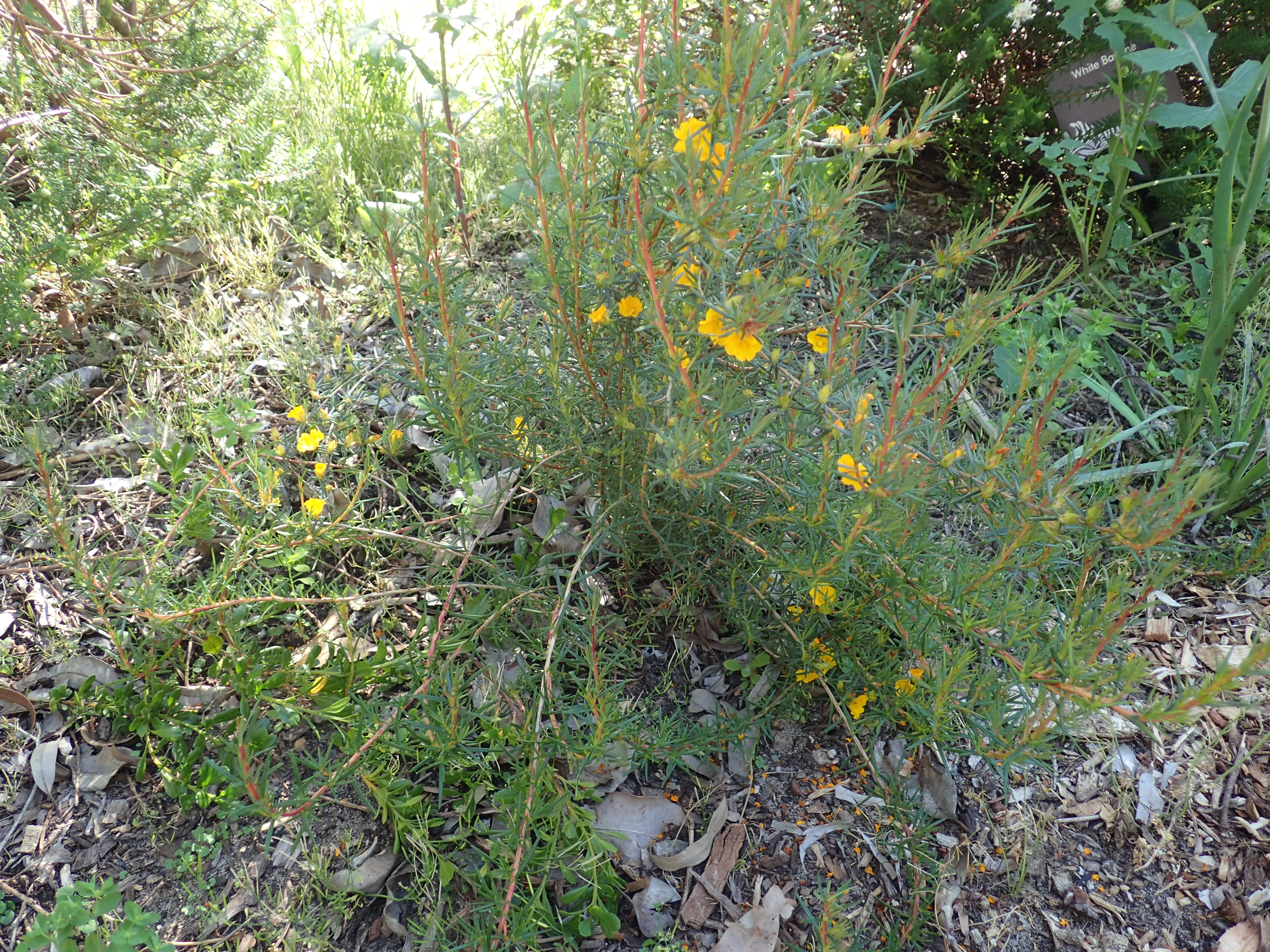
Habit in Kings Park, Perth

Hibbertia aurea is a shrub in the Dilleniaceae family that is native to Western Australia.

== Description ==
The erect and multi-branched shrub typically grows to a height of 0.25 to 1.0 m (9.8 in to 3 ft 3.4 in). The small green leaves are around 20 mm (0.79 in) in length with a width of 1 mm (0.039 in). It blooms between July and October and produces yellow flowers. The flowers have a diameter of around 15 mm (0.59 in).

== Taxonomy ==
The species was first formally described by the botanist Ernst Gottlieb von Steudel in 1845 as part of Johann Georg Christian Lehmann's work Dilleniaceae. Plantae Preissianae. The specific epithet is taken from the Latin word meaning gold in reference to the colour of the flower.

== Distribution ==
The species is found mostly along the west coast in the Mid West, Wheatbelt, Peel and South West regions of Western Australia from around Geraldton in the north down to around Nannup in the south. The plant grows in granitic or lateritic soils.

== See also ==
- List of Hibbertia species
