= Leioproctus glendae =

Scientific classification
- Kingdom: Animalia
- Phylum: Arthropoda
- Clade: Pancrustacea
- Class: Insecta
- Order: Hymenoptera
- Family: Colletidae
- Genus: Leioproctus
- Species: L. glendae

Binomial name
- Leioproctus glendae Batley & Popic, 2016

Species of bee

Leioproctus glendae is a species of bee in the family Colletidae and subfamily Colletinae. It is endemic to Australia. It was described by entomologists Michael Batley and Tony Popic in 2016.

== Etymology ==
The specific epithet glendae honours Glenda Wardle for her contributions to desert ecology.

== Description ==
The holotype female body length is 5.8 mm, head width 1.83 mm; male body length 5.5–5.8 mm, head width 1.74–1.84 mm. Integumental colouration is mainly black, with an orange-brown metasoma. The hair is white to brown.

== Distribution and habitat ==
The species occurs in Central West Queensland. The type locality is Ethabuka Reserve.

== Behaviour ==
The adults are flying mellivores. Flowering plants visited by the bees include Scaevola depauperata.

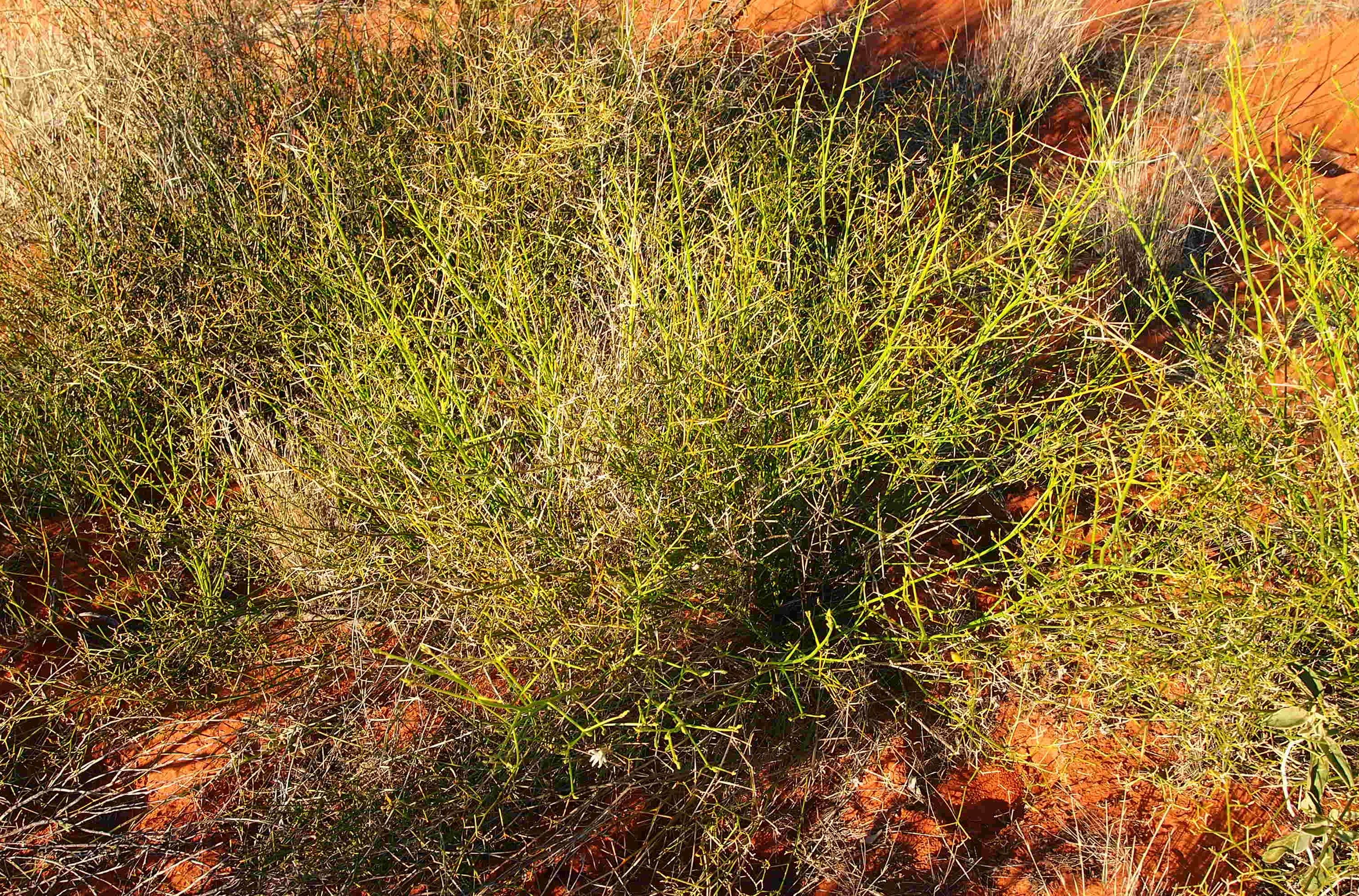
Scaevola depauperata (skeleton fan-flower), a forage plant of the bees

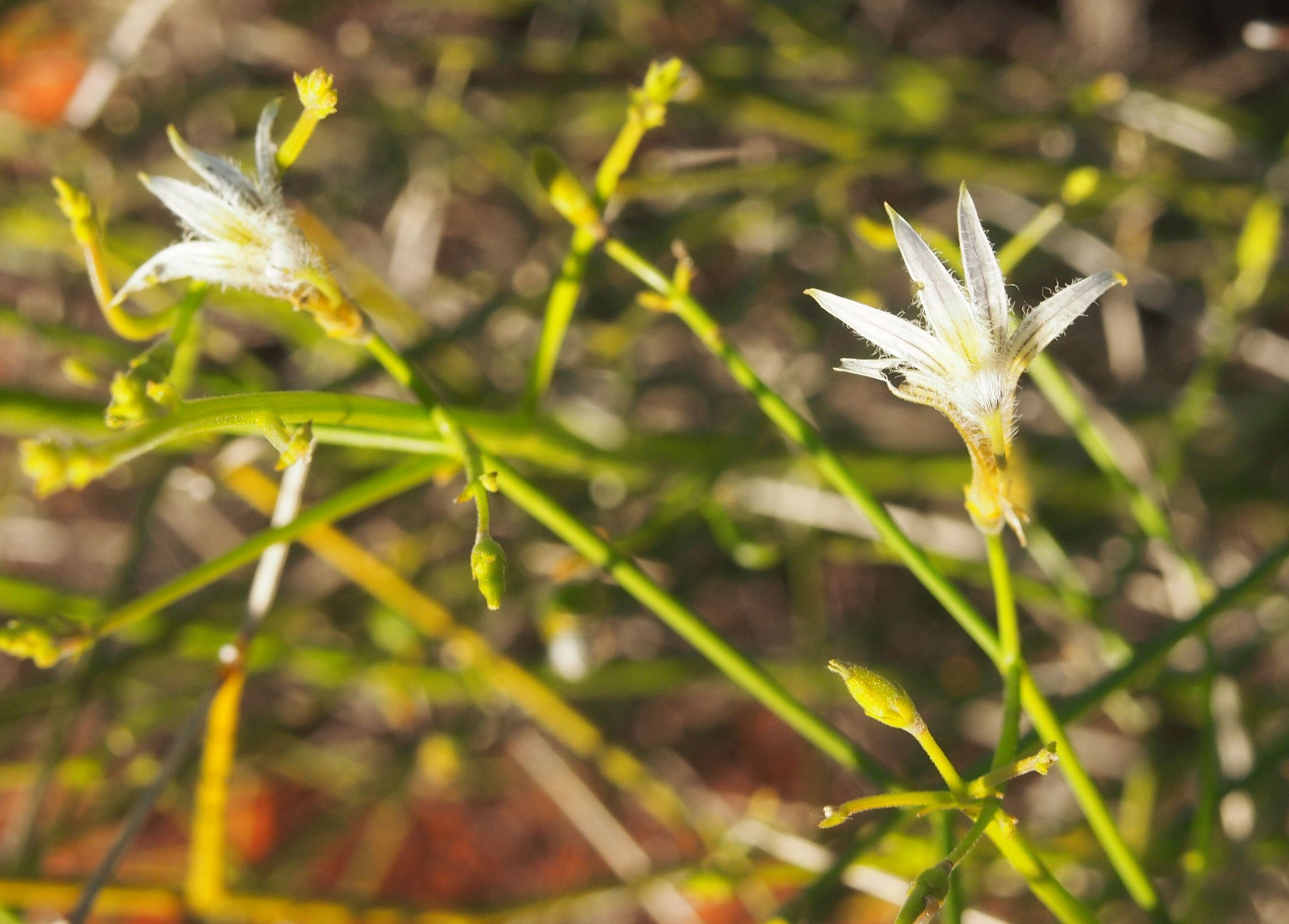
Flowers of Scaevola depauperata
