= Jasper Park =

Jasper Park may refer to:

- Jasper National Park, the largest national park in the Canadian Rockies
- Jasper Park, Edmonton, a neighborhood in west Edmonton, Alberta, Canada
- SS Jasper Park a World War 2 cargo ship, sank in the war by U-boat

== See also ==
- Jasper (disambiguation)
