= Easter National Park =

National park in Western Australia

- Location within Western Australia
- Easter National Park (●)
- Type: National park
- Location: South West region
- Coordinates: 34.2022°S 115.7951°E
- Area: 2,985 ha (7,380 acres)
- Established: 2004
- Administrator: Department of Biodiversity, Conservation and Attractions

Easter National Park is a national park in the South West region of Western Australia, 294 kilometres (183 mi) south of Perth. It is located adjacent to the east of the much larger Hilliger and Milyeannup national parks, in the Shire of Nannup. The majority of the national park is located east of the Vasse Highway. It is located in the Jarrah Forest and Warren bioregions.

Easter National Park was created in 2004 as Class A reserve No. 47877 with a size of 2,985 hectares (7,380 acres) by an act of parliament by the Parliament of Western Australia on 8 December 2004, as one of 19 national parks proclaimed in the state that day.
