= Lake Jasper, Western Australia =

Locality in the Shire of Nannup, Western Australia

Lake Jasper
- other
- Coordinates: 34.40°S 115.67°E
- Country: Australia
- State: Western Australia
- LGA: Shire of Nannup
- Location: 267 km (166 mi) from Perth; 83 km (52 mi) from Busselton; 42 km (26 mi) from Nannup

Government
  - State electorate: Warren-Blackwood
  - Federal division: O'Connor

Area
  - Total: 275.7 km^{2} (106.4 sq mi)

Population
  - Total: 27 (SAL 2021)
- Postcode: 6260
Localities around Lake Jasper
Scott River East	Peerabeelup	Peerabeelup
Scott River East	Lake Jasper	Yeagarup
	Southern Ocean

Lake Jasper is a rural locality of the Shire of Nannup in the South West region of Western Australia. Central within the locality lies the lake of the same name while, in the south, it borders the Southern Ocean. A large part of the locality is taken up by the D'Entrecasteaux National Park; its south-eastern border runs along the Donnelly River. The north of Lake Jasper is taken up by agriculture, among them the large dairy farms of Lactanz 1 and 4, while Lactanz 2 and 3 are in the neighbouring locality of Scott River East. Lactanz Dairy was Western Australia's largest dairy producer when it was sold for A$30 million in 2016 to Australian Agribusiness Group.

Lake Jasper is located on the traditional land of the Noongar nation. Scientific evidence proves a Noongar presence in the South West region for at least 47,000 years, while the oldest evidence for presence in the D'Entrecasteaux National Park dates back 6,000 years.

The heritage listed Black Point on the Southern Ocean coast is located with the locality of Lake Jasper, an outcrop of the Bunbury Basalt, which is rarely exposed. It is an important scientific research site, and dates back to 135 million years ago, when it was formed by a volcanic lava flow.

The historic Jangardup Stock Route originally started in the north of the locality on the route heading north to what is now the Vasse Highway. It was last used as a stock route in the mid-1960s. The heritage listed Quannup House, dating as far back as 1864, is also within the locality.

Access to the locality and the lake has been historically difficult and underdeveloped. A 1944 newspaper report complained that to get to the lake for the purpose of exploring its potential to stock trout, a round trip of 100 miles (160 km) and a 2 miles (3.2 km) track through swamp had to be made, despite the fact that it was only 28 miles (45 km) from Pemberton. Roads in the coastal region, especially within the national park, are still often four-wheel drive only and closed in winter because of rain.
