= Peerabeelup, Western Australia =

Locality in the Shire of Nannup, Western Australia

Peerabeelup
- other
- Coordinates: 34.32°S 115.76°E
- Country: Australia
- State: Western Australia
- LGA: Shire of Nannup
- Location: 264 km (164 mi) from Perth; 84 km (52 mi) from Busselton; 38 km (24 mi) from Nannup

Government
  - State electorate: Warren-Blackwood
  - Federal division: O'Connor

Area
  - Total: 159.2 km^{2} (61.5 sq mi)

Population
  - Total: 18 (SAL 2021)
- Postcode: 6260
Localities around Peerabeelup
Scott River East	Biddelia	Glenoran
Lake Jasper	Peerabeelup	Glenoran
Lake Jasper	Yeagarup	Beedelup

Peerabeelup is a rural locality of the Shire of Nannup in the South West region of Western Australia. The Vasse Highway runs through the centre of the locality from north to south, turning east towards Pemberton right at the southern boundary of the locality, while the Donnelly River flows through Peerabeelup from the east to the south-west. Along the south-eastern boundary of the locality, the Greater Beedelup National Park just stretches into Peerabeelup, as does a small section of the D'Entrecasteaux National Park on the south-western boundary. Most of the remainder of Peerabeelup is covered by state forest.

Peerabeelup is located on the traditional land of the Noongar nation.

The historic Callcup Stock Route runs through the locality on the route that is now the Vasse Highway. It was last used as a stock route in the late 1950s.
