= Jasper Creek =

Jasper Creek may refer to:

- Jasper Creek (California)
- Jasper Creek (Venezuela)
