= Jalbarragup Important Bird Area =

Important Bird Area in Western Australia

Coordinates: 34°02′42″S 115°35′37″E

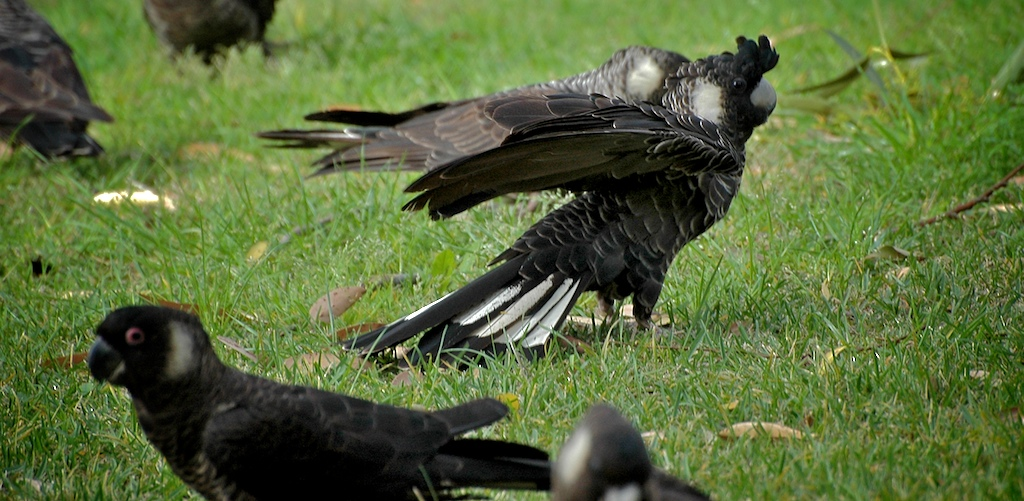
The IBA is an important site for Carnaby's cockatoos

Jalbarragup Important Bird Area is a 258 km^{2}, fragmented tract of land. It comprises the blocks of native vegetation of more than 1 ha on private land, water catchment areas, state forests, nature reserves and other reserves within a ten-kilometre radius of Jalbarragup in the Shire of Nannup, south-west Western Australia. The area has a Mediterranean climate.

== Birds ==
The site has been identified by BirdLife International as an Important Bird Area (IBA) because it supports at least three breeding pairs of Baudin's cockatoo and 20 breeding pairs of Carnaby's cockatoo, both of which are listed as endangered, with associated feeding habitat. The IBA also supports red-capped parrots, western rosellas, rufous treecreepers, red-winged fairywrens, western spinebills, western thornbills, western yellow robins and white-breasted robins. The forest subspecies of the red-tailed black-cockatoo (Calyptorhynchus banksii naso), listed as vulnerable under the federal Environment Protection and Biodiversity Conservation Act 1999, is also likely to be a breeding resident of the IBA.
