= Blackwood River National Park =

National park in Western Australia

- IUCN category II (national park)
- Location within Western Australia
- Blackwood River National Park (●)
- Location: Shire of Augusta–Margaret River and Shire of Nannup, South West region, Western Australia
- Coordinates: 34.0671°S 115.433°E
- Area: 204.75 km^{2} (79.05 sq mi)
- Designation: National park
- Designated: 2004
- Governing body: Parks and Wildlife Service of the Department of Biodiversity, Conservation and Attractions

Blackwood River National Park is a national park in Western Australia. It extends along the middle reach of the Blackwood River, the largest river in South West Australia. It is located in the shires of Augusta–Margaret River and Nannup in the South West region. It was designated in 2004, and covers an area of 204.75 km^{2}.

== Geography ==
The park extends along the middle stretch of the Blackwood River, which rises on the plateau and flows westwards through the park, turning south at the park's western end to empty into the Southern Ocean.

It mostly surrounded by state forest lands, including Blackwood State Forest, South Blackwood State Forest, and Milyeannup State Forest. Wiltshire-Butler National Park adjoins the middle section of the park on the north. An unnamed national park (WA46400) adjoins the park to the west.

== Flora and fauna ==
The park straddles two bioregions – the Jarrah Forest bioregion, also known as the Southwest Australia woodlands, in the north, and the Warren bioregion, also known as the Jarra-Karri forest and shrublands, to the south.

== Recreation ==
There are two campgrounds in the park – Warner Glen at the western end of the park, at Sues Bridge in the central portion of the park. There is river access at both campgrounds for campers and day visitors, with swimming and a launch for canoes and kayaks.

== Conservation ==
The park was proposed in the Regional Forest Agreement for the South-West Forest Region of Western Australia (May 1999), and Western Australia's Forest Management Plan 2004-2013 as part of its strategy to better protect old-growth forests. It was created by the Reserves (National Parks, Conservation Parks, and Nature Reserves) Bill 2004, which redesignated lands from four state forests to create the new national park.
