= Eddy Jaspers =

Belgian footballer

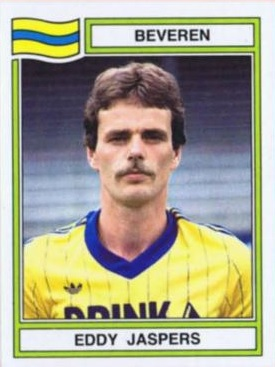

Personal information
- Date of birth: 15 April 1956 (age 70)

International career
| Years | Team | Apps | (Gls) |
| 1984 | Belgium | 3 | (0) |

Eddy Jaspers (born 15 April 1956) is a Belgian footballer. He played in three matches for the Belgium national football team in 1984.

Jaspers, trained at KSV Wildert, ended up at KSK Beveren in the mid-1970s. In his first two seasons, Eddy did not have a starting spot, but from 1976 he was an indispensable part of the team for ten seasons. Jaspers achieved great success with Beveren by winning twice the Belgian Championship (in the 1978-79 and the 1983-84-season as wellas the Belgian Cup (1978 and 1983). This earned him three caps for the Belgian national team.

In 1986 he signed a three-year contract with Racing Jet Wavre, and two years later Jaspers played six months on loan at Antwerp FC, followed by six months at the Dutch club Willem II Tilburg. At the end of his career, he also played for several Belgian amateur clubs such as Standaard Wetteren, KSV Wildert, and K Putte SK, after which he concluded his active football career at the age of 39.
