= Brockman Highway =

Highway in the South West region of Western Australia

Brockman Highway Western Australia
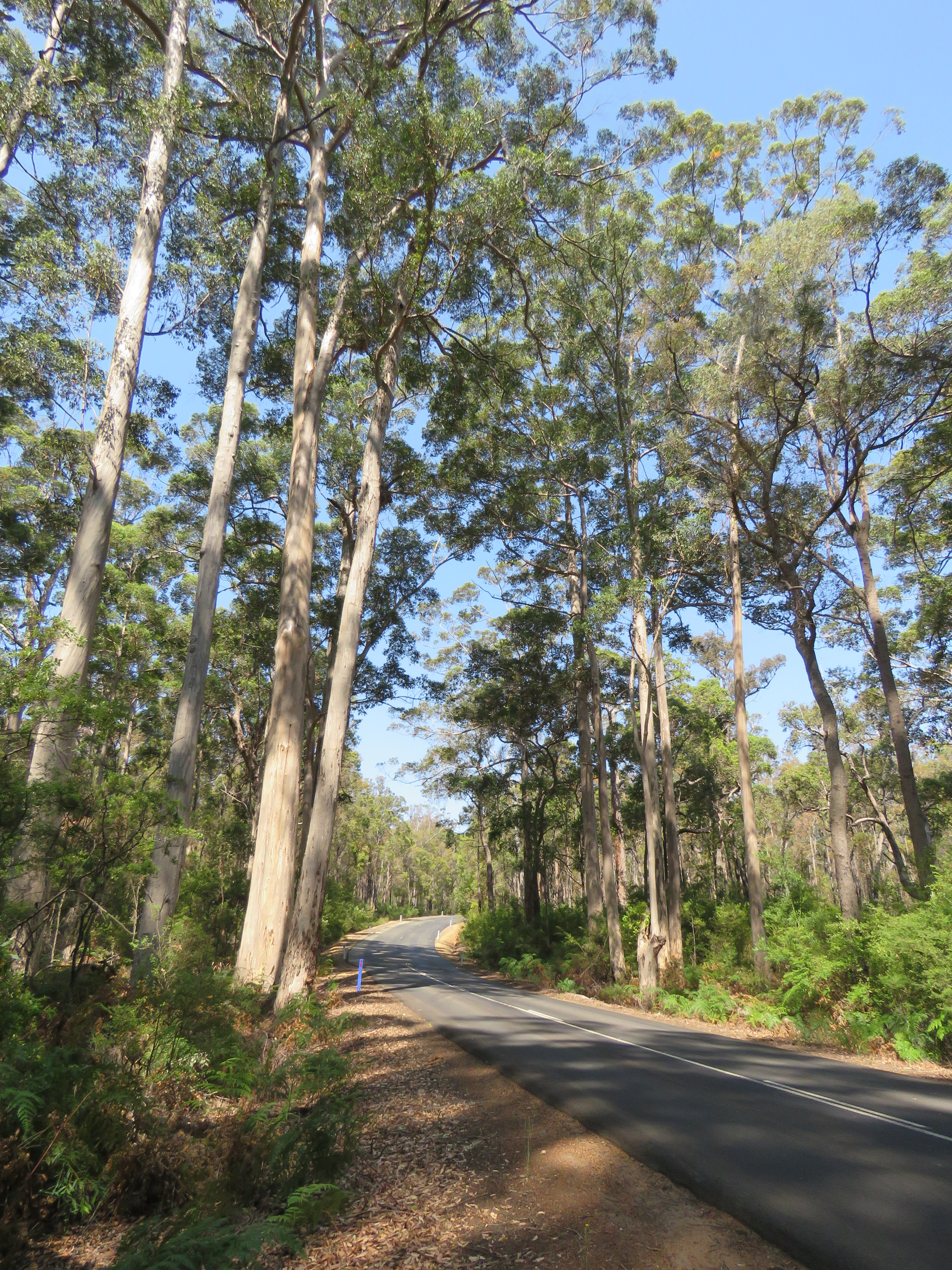
- The Brockman Highway at Karri Gully, east of Nannup

General information
- Type: Highway
- Length: 123 km (76 mi)
- Route number(s): State Route 10 (Karridale – Nannup)

Major junctions
- West end: Bussell Highway (State Route 10), Karridale
- Vasse Highway (State Route 10 / State Route 104)
- East end: South Western Highway (National Route 1), Bridgetown

Location(s)
- Major settlements: Nannup

Highway system
- Highways in Australia; National Highway • Freeways in Australia; Highways in Western Australia

Brockman Highway is a highway in Western Australia. A few hours south of Perth, it runs west from Bridgetown via Nannup to Karridale.

Nannup is situated at the junction of the Vasse Highway and the Brockman Highway.

== Major intersections ==
LGA	Location	km	mi	Destinations	Notes
Augusta–Margaret River	Karridale	0	0.0	Bussell Highway (State Route 10) – Augusta, Margaret River, Busselton	State Route 10 also continues south along Bussell Highway to Augusta as a spur route
Blackwood River		9.8– 10	6.1– 6.2	Bridge over river	
Augusta–Margaret River–Nannup boundary	Schroeder, Darradup, Scott River East tripoint	29.6	18.4	Sues Road – Busselton, Bunbury	
Nannup	Darradup, Scott River East boundary	41.5	25.8	Stewart Road – Pemberton	
Nannup	Nannup	73.1	45.4	Vasse Highway (State Route 10) – Manjimup, Pemberton, Northcliffe	Eastern terminus of Brockman Highway's western section. Continuing traffic must follow Vasse Highway (State Route 104).
Nannup	Nannup	75.1	46.7	Vasse Highway (State Route 104) – Yoongarillup, Busselton	Western terminus of Brockman Highway's eastern section.
Nannup	Nannup	75.3	46.8	Grange Road (Tourist Drive 251) – Southampton, Balingup	Access to Nannup Balingup Road. Tourist Drive 251 western concurrency terminus
Bridgetown–Greenbushes	Bridgetown	120	75	South Western Highway (National Route 1) – Bunbury, Donnybrook, Manjimup, Albany	Eastern terminus of Brockman Highway's eastern section. Tourist Drive 251 southern terminus
1.000 mi = 1.609 km; 1.000 km = 0.621 mi: Concurrency terminus; Route transition

== See also ==
- Highways in Australia
- List of highways in Western Australia
