= Hilliger National Park =

National park in Western Australia

- Location within Western Australia
- Hilliger National Park (●) is in the Shire of Nannup in the South West region
- Type: National park
- Location: South West region
- Coordinates: 34.244565°S 115.651951°E
- Area: 16,962 ha (41,910 acres)
- Established: 2004
- Administrator: Department of Biodiversity, Conservation and Attractions

Hilliger National Park is a national park in the South West region of Western Australia, 304 kilometres (189 mi) south of Perth. It is located in the Shire of Nannup, with the Milyeannup National Park bordering to the north and the Easter National Park to the east. The park is located in the Jarrah Forest and Warren bioregions.

Hilliger National Park was created as Class A reserve No. 47668 on 30 November 2004 with a size of 16,962 hectares (41,910 acres) as one of nine national parks proclaimed in the state that day.

The national park was named after Johannes Hilliger, a former employee of the Forests Department, who died fighting a bushfire at Barlee Brook in 1958. The Wiltshire-Butler National Park, further to the north-west, was named John Francis Wiltshire-Butler for the same reason, having also died fighting the 1958 fire. Four men died in the fire - Robert Henry Johnston, George McCorkill were the other two victims who are memorialised in Nannup.
