= Jasper Creek (California) =

- Location within California Location within the United States

Physical characteristics
- Source
  - coordinates: 35.977183°N 120.4134852°W
- Mouth
  - coordinates: 36.0369034°N 120.4029289°W

Jasper Creek is a stream in Fresno and Monterey counties, California, in the United States.

Jasper Creek was named from the jasper buttes lining its banks.

== See also ==
- List of rivers of California
