= Wiltshire-Butler National Park =

National park in Western Australia

- Interactive map of Wiltshire-Butler National Park
- Type: National park
- Location: South West region
- Coordinates: 34°02′14″S 115°29′29″E
- Area: 11,645 hectares (28,780 acres)
- Administrator: Department of Biodiversity, Conservation and Attractions

Wiltshire-Butler National Park is a national park in the South West region of Western Australia, 265 km (165 mi) south of Perth. It is located in the Shire of Nannup, bordering the Blackwood River National Park. The park is located in the Jarrah Forest bioregion.

Wiltshire-Butler National Park was created as Class A reserve No. 47667 on 30 November 2004 with a size of 11,645 hectares (28,780 acres) as one of nine national parks proclaimed in the state that day.

The national park was named after John Francis Wiltshire-Butler, a former employee of the Forests Department, who died fighting a bushfire at Barlee Brook in 1958. The Hilliger National Park, further to the south-east, was named Johannes Hilliger for the same reason, having also died fighting the 1958 fire.
