= HMS Jasper =

Six ships of the Royal Navy have borne the name HMS Jasper, after the mineral Jasper:

- HMS Jasper (1808) was a 10-gun Cherokee-class brig-sloop launched in 1808 and wrecked in 1817.
- HMS Jasper (1820) was a 10-gun Cherokee-class brig-sloop launched in 1820 and wrecked in 1828. The wreck was sold in 1831.
- HMS Jasper (1837) was a wooden paddle packet, originally the General Post Office vessel Aladdin. She was transferred to the navy in 1837 and caught fire and sank in 1854.
- HMS Jasper (1855) was a Dapper-class wooden screw gunboat launched in 1855. She ran aground during the Siege of Taganrog later in 1855.
- HMS Jasper (1857) was an Algerine-class wooden screw gunboat launched in 1857. She was sold to the Emperor of China in 1862 and renamed Amoy. She was resold to Egypt in 1865.
- HMS Jasper (J407) was a US-built Catherine-class minesweeper launched as HMS Garnet in 1943 and transferred to the Royal Navy under lend-lease. She was renamed HMS Jasper in 1944 and was returned to the United States Navy in 1946.
