= Jasper County =

Jasper County may refer to:

- Jasper County, Georgia
- Jasper County, Illinois
- Jasper County, Indiana
- Jasper County, Iowa
- Jasper County, Mississippi
- Jasper County, Missouri
- Jasper County, South Carolina
- Jasper County, Texas

== See also ==
- Jasper County (album)
