= Nannup Four disappearance =

2007 disappearance of four people in Western Australia

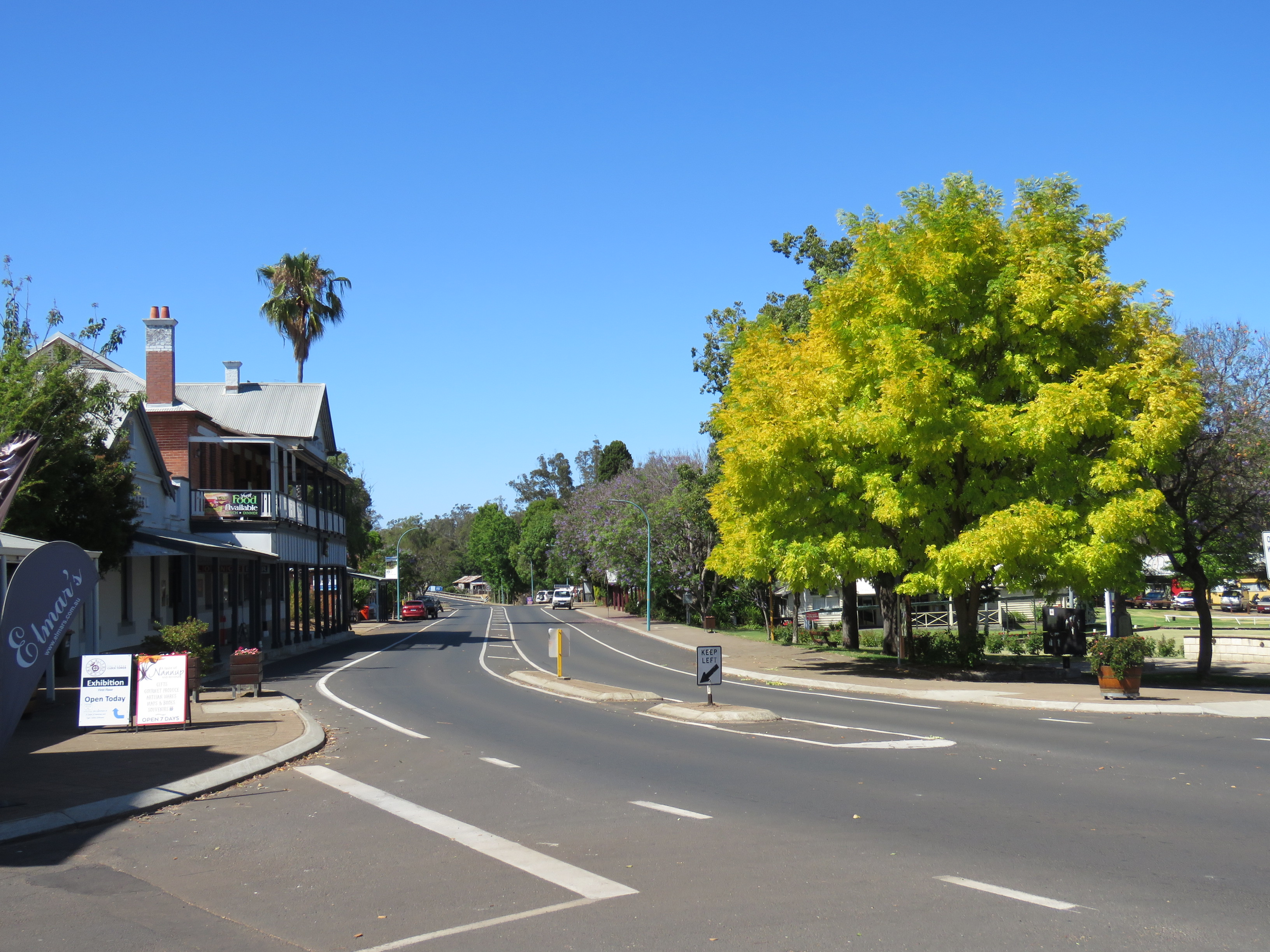
- Nannup, Western Australia, the town near where the group was last known to be living.
- Date: July 2007
- Location: Near Nannup, Western Australia, Australia
- Type: Missing-person case
- Participants: Simon Kadwill; Chantelle McDougall; Leela McDougall; Tony Popic
- Outcome: Unresolved disappearance
- Inquiries: Western Australia Police investigation; 2017 coronial inquest

The Nannup Four disappearance refers to the July 2007 disappearance of four people from a rural property near Nannup, Western Australia: Simon Kadwill (Gary Felton), Chantelle McDougall, McDougall's daughter Leela McDougall, and Tony Popic.

The group had been living communally in Western Australia's South West region and were described in reporting and inquest coverage as followers of Kadwill, a British-born spiritual leader associated with apocalyptic beliefs and online proselytising.

Despite police investigations and a coronial inquest, no confirmed trace of the four has been found since 2007.

== Background ==
Kadwill was originally from the United Kingdom and later moved to Western Australia, where he gathered a small group of followers. Former associates described him as charismatic and controlling, and said he promoted beliefs about spiritual transformation, withdrawal from mainstream society, and impending catastrophe.

By 2007, Kadwill was living near Nannup with Chantelle McDougall, her daughter Leela, and Tony Popic. Reporting described the group as living in relative isolation from the local community.

Nannup map

== Disappearance ==
The four were last known to be living at a rural property near Nannup in July 2007. When relatives later visited the property, they found personal belongings and vehicles left behind.

A note reportedly indicated that the group had gone to Brazil. Investigators later found no confirmed evidence that any of them had left Australia, and reporting has stated that there was no post-disappearance activity on their bank accounts.

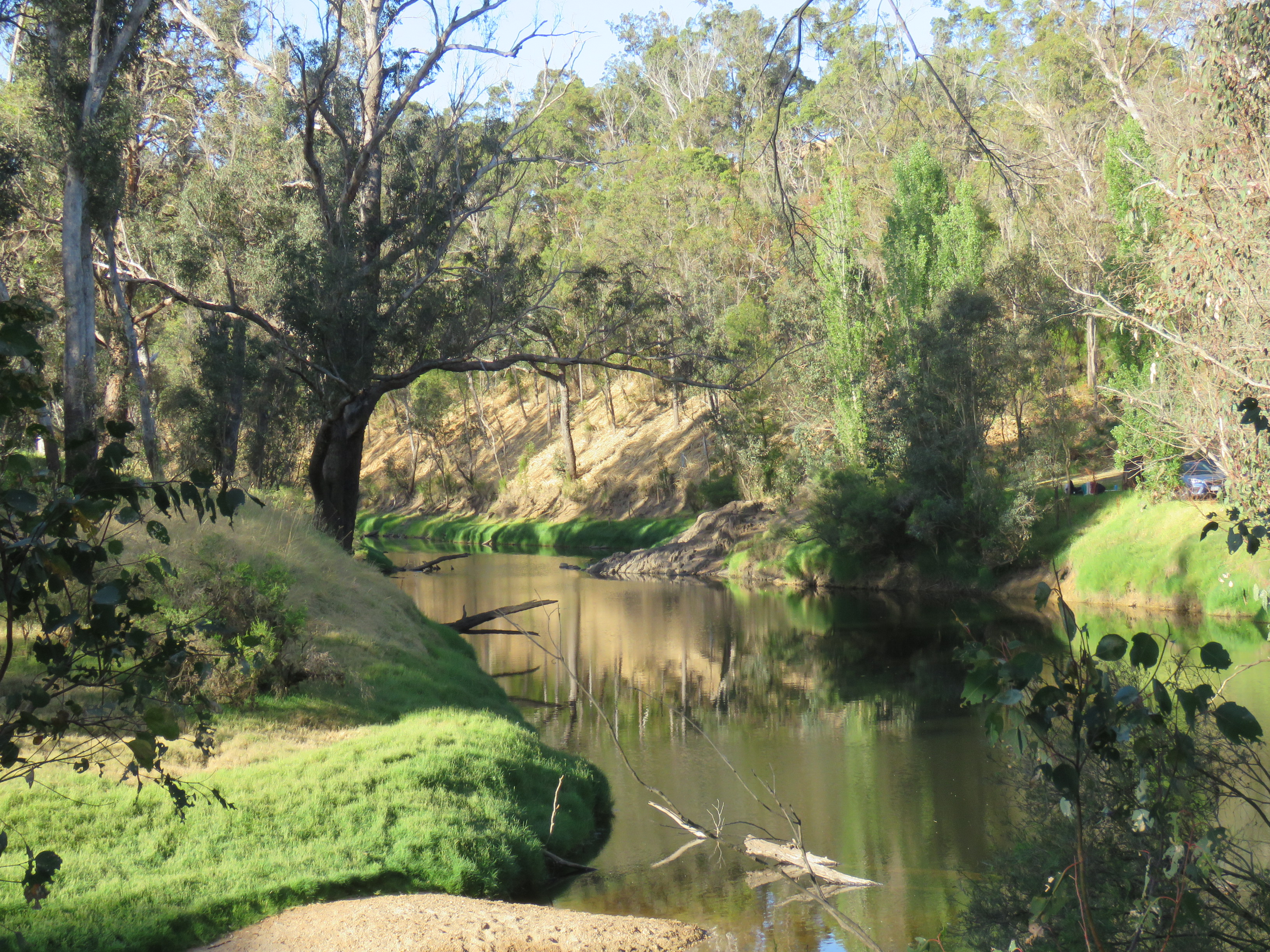
The Blackwood River near Nannup in Western Australia's South West region.

== Investigation ==
The case was investigated by Western Australia Police, which examined financial records, travel records and reported sightings, and carried out searches in the surrounding bushland.

During the 2017 inquest, evidence was given that some possible sightings and lines of inquiry had not been fully resolved in the years immediately after the disappearance.

Despite these efforts, investigators did not determine what happened to the group.

== Coronial inquest ==
A coronial inquest into the disappearance was held in Busselton in December 2017. The inquest heard evidence from police, relatives, former associates and expert witnesses.

Evidence reported from the inquest described Kadwill as exercising strong influence over followers and using spiritual doctrine to isolate and control them.

In May 2018, the coroner ruled that it was not possible to determine whether the four were alive or dead.

== Reported explanations ==
Reliable reporting on the investigation and inquest has outlined several possible explanations for the disappearance.

=== Suicide pact ===
One theory raised in evidence was that the group may have entered into a suicide pact influenced by Kadwill's beliefs. The coroner, however, did not find sufficient evidence to prove that this had occurred.

=== Accidental death in bushland ===
Investigators also considered whether the group may have died in remote terrain near Nannup. Reporting noted the density and remoteness of the surrounding bushland as a factor that could hamper discovery of remains.

=== Voluntary disappearance ===
Another possibility considered was that the four deliberately disappeared and assumed new identities. Reporting has also noted, however, that no confirmed travel or financial evidence has emerged to support this explanation.

=== Foul play ===
Foul play has also been discussed in coverage of the case, though no public evidence has established that explanation.

== Timeline ==
- Early 2000s – Kadwill relocates to Western Australia and gathers a small group of followers.
- July 2007 – Kadwill, Chantelle McDougall, Leela McDougall and Tony Popic disappear from a property near Nannup.
- May 2017 – Local media revisit the case a decade after the disappearance.
- December 2017 – A coronial inquest hears evidence about the group’s disappearance.
- May 2018 – The coroner rules that it is impossible to determine whether the four are alive or dead.
- 2024–2026 – Renewed media attention includes further reporting by The West Australian, ABC News, and ABC's Expanse series.

== Media coverage ==
The disappearance has received periodic national and state-level media attention because of its unusual circumstances and the alleged cult dynamics surrounding the group. Coverage has appeared in ABC News, The Guardian, SBS News, The West Australian, and PerthNow.

In 2026, the case was revisited in the ABC audio documentary series Expanse.

== See also ==
- List of people who disappeared mysteriously
- missing person
- New religious movement
