= Jasper (surname) =

Jasper is a surname. Notable people with the surname include:

== People ==
- Chris Jasper (1951–2025), American singer, composer and producer, member of the Isley Brothers
- David Jasper (born 1951), Scottish theologian
- Derrick Jasper (born 1988), American former college basketball player
- Dick Jasper, 1950s American drag racer
- Ed Jasper (born 1973), American former National Football League player
- Heinrich Jasper (1875–1945), German politician
- Herbert Jasper (1906–1999), Canadian psychologist, physiologist, anatomist, chemist and neurologist
- Hi Jasper (1886–1937), Major League Baseball pitcher
- Inez Jasper (born 1981), Canadian singer-songwriter
- James M. Jasper (born 1957), American writer and sociologist
- John Jasper (1812–1901), American ex-slave, Baptist preacher and public speaker
- Josh Jasper (born 1987), All-American college football placekicker
- Ken Jasper (born 1938), Australian politician
- Kenji Jasper, writer
- Lee Jasper (born 1958), British race equality campaigner
- Marrit Jasper (born 1996), Dutch volleyball player
- Michael Jasper (born 1986), American former National Football League player
- Paul Jasper (born 1974), American former race car driver
- Paul G. Jasper (1908–2001), Justice of the Indiana Supreme Court
- Sam Jasper (born 1986), New Zealand footballer
- Shawn Jasper (born 1959), American politician
- Theodore Jasper (1814–1897), portrait painter and photographic colorist
- Thomas Chilton Jasper (1844–1924), American Civil War Confederate general
- William Jasper (c. 1750–1779), American Revolutionary War sergeant

== Fictional characters ==
- John Jasper, protagonist of The Mystery of Edwin Drood, Charles Dickens' unfinished last novel

== See also ==
- Jaspers (disambiguation), another surname
