= Lake Jasper =

Lake in Western Australia

- Location in Western Australia
- Interactive map of Lake Jasper
- Location: Lake Jasper, South West, Western Australia
- Coordinates: 34°24′38″S 115°40′56″E
- Type: Freshwater lake
- Basin countries: Australia
- Max. length: 4 km (2.5 mi)
- Max. width: 2 km (1.2 mi)
- Surface area: 4.5 km^{2} (1.7 sq mi)
- Average depth: 3 m (9.8 ft)
- Max. depth: 10.3 m (34 ft)

Lake Jasper is a permanent freshwater lake in the locality of Lake Jasper, in the South West area of Western Australia. It has evidence of ancient Aboriginal activity beneath its waters.

The lake is located on a flat sandy plain, the Scott Coastal Plain, with a high dune ridge to the west and the Donnelly River to the east. The lake is contained within the boundaries of the D'Entrecasteaux National Park. The camp site has seating facilities on the eastern side of the lake, but is subject to a complete fire ban and forbids vehicle access to the shoreline; the camp site is only accessible by four-wheel drive vehicles.

Lake Jasper has two smaller lakes located to the east: Lake Wilson and Lake Smith. All of these bodies are part of the Donnelly River catchment area and they all are inhabited by all of the regions endemic freshwater fish species. The lake has significant floristic value as it supports an extensive area of tall sedgeland. The area is also an important habitat for fish, waterbirds, invertebrates and frogs.

The lake is known as a White Water Lake as the lack of tannic acid in the water allows good light dispersion. The lake water is of a high quality and high quality artesian water also exists in the area.

An archaeological site in the lake is the only known Australian example of a submerged Aboriginal occupation site. In 1989 and 1990 submarine excavations found flaked stone artifacts and standing tree stumps on the floor of the lake at depths of up to eight metres. Radiocarbon dating showed an inundation period through sea level rise of 4,000 to 3,400 years BP.

Lake Jasper was named in memory of Jasper Taylor Molloy Bussell (1863–1864), son of Alfred and Ellen Bussell.

== See also ==
- List of lakes of Australia § Western Australia
