= Milyeannup National Park =

National park in Western Australia

- Interactive map of Milyeannup National Park
- Type: National park
- Location: South West region
- Coordinates: 34°09′19″S 115°39′10″E
- Area: 18,692 hectares (46,190 acres)
- Established: 2004
- Administrator: Department of Biodiversity, Conservation and Attractions

Milyeannup National Park is a national park in the South West region of Western Australia, 309 km (192 mi) south of Perth. It is located in the Shire of Nannup, bordering the Hilliger National Park. The park is located in the Jarrah Forest bioregion.

Milyeannup National Park was created as Class A reserve No. 47669 on 30 November 2004 with a size of 18,692 hectares (46,190 acres) as one of nine national parks proclaimed in the state that day.
