= Schroeder, Western Australia =

Schroeder
- Interactive map of Schroeder
- Coordinates: 34°0′57″S 115°21′38″E
- Country: Australia
- State: Western Australia
- LGAs: Shire of Augusta-Margaret River; Shire of Nannup

Government
  - State electorate: Vasse Warren-Blackwood
  - Federal division: Forrest O'Connor

Area
  - Total: 531.7 km^{2} (205.3 sq mi)

Population
  - Total: 0 (SAL 2016)
- Postcode: 6285

Schroeder is a locality in the Shire of Augusta-Margaret River and Shire of Nannup in the South West region of Western Australia.
