= Shire of Nannup =

Coordinates: 33°58′55″S 115°45′54″E

- Local government area
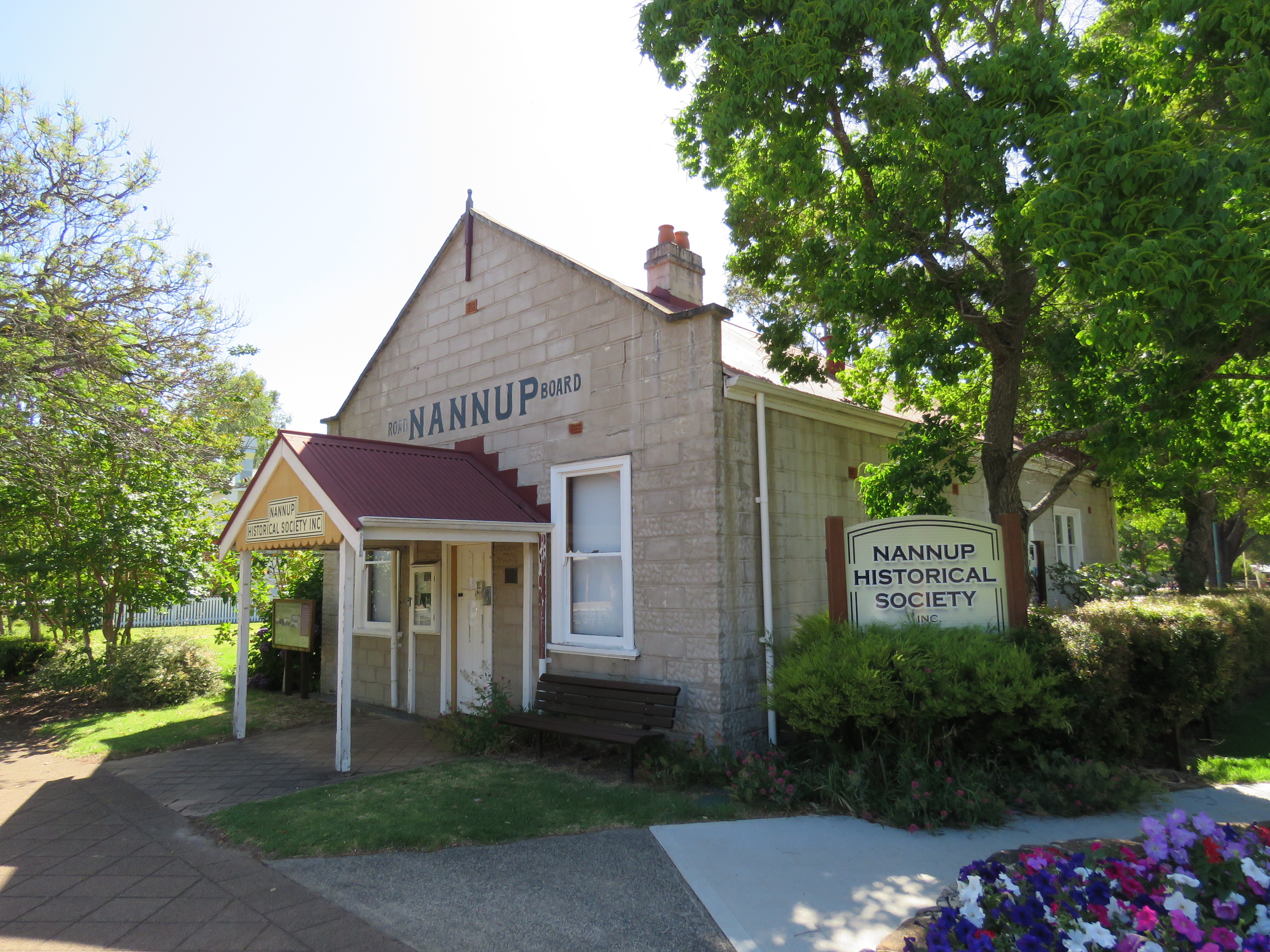
- The heritage listed former Nannup Road Board Office

- Interactive map of Shire of Nannup
- Country: Australia
- State: Western Australia
- Region: South West
- Established: 1890
- Council seat: Nannup

Government
  - Shire President: Tony Dean
  - State electorate: Warren-Blackwood
  - Federal division: O'Connor

Area
  - Total: 2,934.6 km^{2} (1,133.1 sq mi)

Population
  - Total: 1,538 (LGA 2021)
- Website: Shire of Nannup
LGAs around Shire of Nannup
Busselton	Busselton	Donnybrook- Balingup
Augusta- Margaret River	Shire of Nannup	Bridgetown- Greenbushes
Southern Ocean	Southern Ocean	Manjimup

The Shire of Nannup is a local government area in the South West region of Western Australia, approximately 280 kilometres (174 mi) south of the state capital, Perth and 60 kilometres (37 mi) southeast of the coastal resort town of Busselton. Its seat of government is the town of Nannup, where about half of the Shire's population reside.

The Shire has a land area of 2,935 square kilometres (1,133 sq mi), about 85% of which is covered in hardwood jarrah, karri and marri forests, while the southern coastline is mostly within the D'Entrecasteaux National Park.

== History ==
The Lower Blackwood Road District was established on 20 February 1890. It was renamed the Nannup Road District on 21 August 1925. On 1 July 1961, it became the Shire of Nannup following the passage of the Local Government Act 1960, which reformed all remaining road districts into shires.

== Indigenous people ==
The Shire of Nannup is located on the traditional land of the Bibulman and Wardandi people of the Noongar nation.

== Wards ==
The Shire is divided into three wards.

- Central Ward (three councillors)
- North Ward (three councillors)
- South Ward (two councillors)

== Towns and localities ==
Below are the towns and localities of the Shire of Nannup with population and size figures based on the most recent Australian census:

Locality	Population	Area	Map
Barrabup	47 (SAL 2021)	201 km^{2} (78 sq mi)	
Biddelia	20 (SAL 2021)	163.2 km^{2} (63.0 sq mi)	
Carlotta	103 (SAL 2021)	364.7 km^{2} (140.8 sq mi)	
Cundinup *	62 (SAL 2021)	156.5 km^{2} (60.4 sq mi)	
Darradup	41 (SAL 2021)	321.2 km^{2} (124.0 sq mi)	
Donnelly River	5 (SAL 2016)	85.1 km^{2} (32.9 sq mi)	
East Nannup	43 (SAL 2021)	104.9 km^{2} (40.5 sq mi)	
Jalbarragup	163 (SAL 2021)	264.6 km^{2} (102.2 sq mi)	
Lake Jasper	27 (SAL 2021)	275.7 km^{2} (106.4 sq mi)	
Nannup	959 (SAL 2021)	245.1 km^{2} (94.6 sq mi)	
Peerabeelup	18 (SAL 2021)	159.2 km^{2} (61.5 sq mi)	
Schroeder *	0 (SAL 2016)	531.7 km^{2} (205.3 sq mi)	
Scott River East	68 (SAL 2021)	563.7 km^{2} (217.6 sq mi)	

- (* indicates locality is only partially located within this shire)

== Notable councillors ==
- Edmund Vernon Brockman, Nannup Roads Board member 1909–1935, 1937–1938, chairman 1915–1935; also a state MP

== Heritage-listed places ==
As of 2023, 88 places are heritage-listed in the Shire of Nannup, of which three are on the State Register of Heritage Places.
