= Nannup, Western Australia =

Town in the South West region of Western Australia

Nannup
- Town
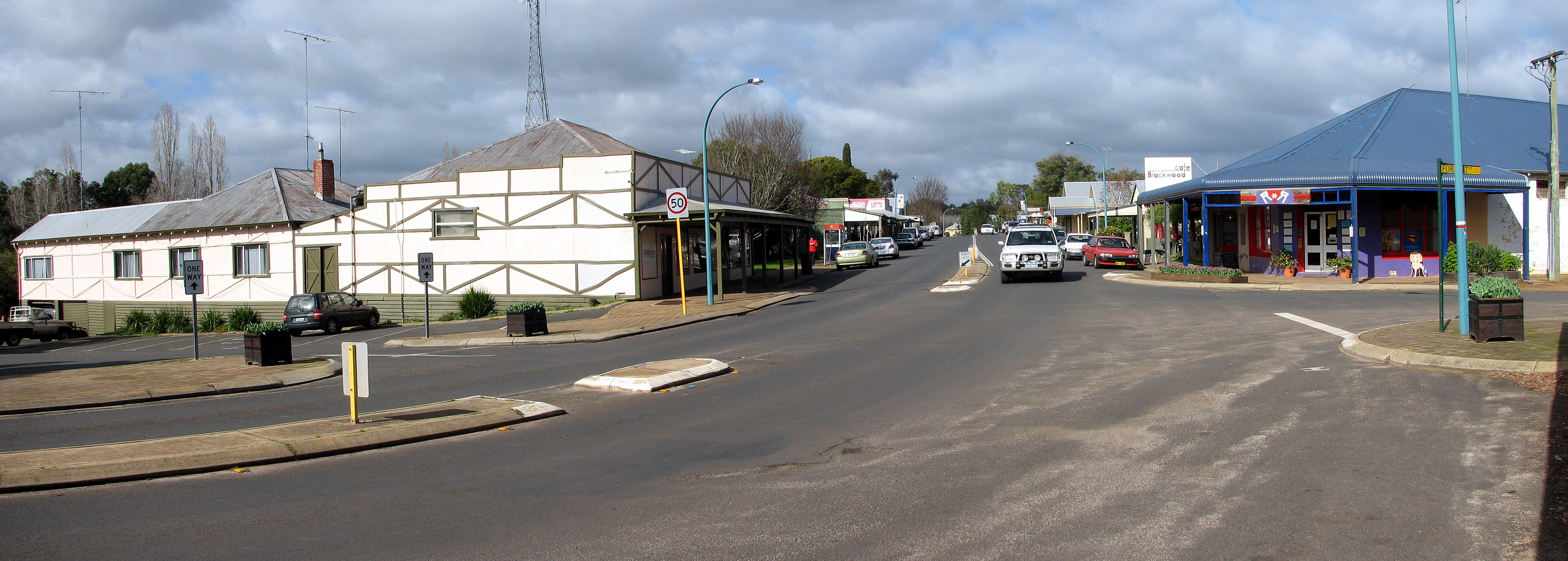
- Panorama of main street in June 2007

- Interactive map of Nannup
- Coordinates: 33°58′55″S 115°45′54″E
- Country: Australia
- State: Western Australia
- LGA: Shire of Nannup
- Location: 281 km (175 mi) from Perth; 71 km (44 mi) from Busselton; 73 km (45 mi) from Pemberton; 45 km (28 mi) from Bridgetown; 110 km (68 mi) from Margaret River
- Established: 1889

Government
  - State electorate: Warren-Blackwood
  - Federal division: Forrest

Area
  - Total: 245.1 km^{2} (94.6 sq mi)
- Elevation: 130 m (430 ft)

Population
  - Total: 538 (UCL 2021)
- Postcode: 6275
- Mean max temp: 22.4 °C (72.3 °F)
- Mean min temp: 8.6 °C (47.5 °F)
- Annual rainfall: 944.8 mm (37.20 in)

Nannup is a town in the South West region of Western Australia, approximately 280 kilometres (174 mi) south of Perth on the Blackwood River at the crossroads of Vasse Highway and Brockman Highway; the highways link Nannup to most of the lower South West's regional centres. At the 2011 census, Nannup had a population of 587.

The town is the seat of the Shire of Nannup.

== History ==
Nannup's name is of Noongar origin, meaning either "stopping place" or "place of parrots", and was first recorded by surveyors in the 1860s. The area was at one point known as "Lower Blackwood", and the first European settler to explore it was Thomas Turner in 1834. In 1866, a bridge was built over the river and a police station was established. A townsite was set aside in 1885, surveyed in 1889 and gazetted on 9 January 1890. In 1906, a primary school and shire office were built.

In 1909, the Nannup branch railway (no longer in operation) was extended from Jarrahwood, linking to the Bunbury-Busselton railway.

Menaced by bushfires in 1928, settlers had to battle hard against the flames to save their properties. More bushfires, fanned by strong winds, swept across the region in 1935 burning out over 100 hectares (247 acres) and destroying one house and a barn. More bushfires were burning in the district over the course of several days in 1937, resulting in the stables and the sheds at the local race course being burned down, the destruction of large amounts of feed for stock, and the loss of telephone lines.

The town was flooded in 1945 when the Blackwood River rose to its highest flood level recorded to that date. Three families were left homeless and others had to be evacuated from the floodwaters. At its highest level the river was running 1.1 metres (3.5 ft) over the Russell Street bridge and the town's electricity supply failed from lines being damaged, leaving the town in darkness. The river flooded again in 1946 and 1947, closing roads but not causing any significant damage to the town.

In 1949 the town received 174 millimetres (6.86 in) of rain in a period of seven hours, causing flooding and one bridge connecting the town to Busselton to be swept away.

Bushfires once again struck in 1950 with several large fires burning only a few miles from town. The outbreak destroyed nearly 12,100 hectares (30,000 acres) of jarrah and karri forest. The fires were brought under control reasonably quickly; they were believed to have been deliberately lit.

The Dry Brook bridge just outside town on the Nannup-Balingup collapsed as a result of flood damage from the previous years. Although the bridge had been repaired after being damaged in smaller floods of 1950, it was undercut again and caved in without causing any injuries.

In 1982 after the remnants of a tropical cyclone passed through the south west, the town and surrounding areas were inundated by heavy rains. The Blackwood rose 11.6 metres (38 ft), submerging over 50 houses.

Parts of the movie Drift were filmed in Nannup in 2011.

One of the oldest buildings, a stone cottage built in 1862–63, is still standing on a farm on Gold Gully Road. The building was in disrepair for a number of years but as of February 2020 is being restored by the current owner.

=== The Nannup Four ===
In July 2007, four persons went missing: a doomsday cult leader Gary Felton/Simon Kadwell, his defacto Chantelle McDougall, their six-year-old daughter Lella, and their lodger, Tony Popic. Despite being a missing person case and a 2017 coronial inquest, the persons have not been located.

=== Marinko Tomas memorial ===
Marinko Tomas (1945–1966), a farmer originally from Nannup, was Western Australia's first national serviceman killed in the Vietnam War. A memorial with a statue and plaque was erected in March 1988 in Nannup's Bicentennial Park. Lance Corporal Tomas died on 8 July 1966, at the age of 21 years, after being hit by shrapnel from "friendly artillery forces".

== Present day ==
Nannup is the only town within the Shire of Nannup, and has a district high school (1961), community resource centre, shire offices, roadhouse, a sporting complex, shopping facilities, accommodation for travellers (hotel/motel, bed and breakfast, caravan park), police station, three cafes, a hardware store, community centre, golf club and golf course, nursery and a gemstone museum. The main street has changed little over the years so has considerable heritage value.

The town population is about 600, with 1200 in the Shire of Nannup.

=== Economy ===
Timber milling and agriculture (principally beef cattle) dominate the local economy although wine, floriculture and tourism are industries of growing importance. Furniture production and other local timber value-adding activities are also a minor employer.

=== World's largest wooden pendulum clock ===
In January 2019, the world's largest wooden pendulum clock was installed in a purpose-built clocktower in the main street. Built by local, Kevin Bird, and featuring timbers from the region, the 6 m (20 ft) tall clock had taken 7 years to build.

However, in April 2019, after three months, disagreements between the attraction partners led to the removal of the clock.

=== Events and festivals ===
Many historical photographs are held by the Nannup Historical Society.

Since the beginnings of the tourist industry in Nannup there have been several events and festivals held to promote the town. These include the Flower and Garden Festival held in August each year, the Quit Forest Rally. Also the Tour of Margaret River and seven cycle races. The largest of Nannup's annual festivals is the Nannup Music Festival (formerly the Southwest Folk Festival) held over the Labour Day long weekend in March each year and includes street performance and market stalls as well as a variety of musical performances.

Nannup is known for hosting the SEVEN gravel cycling race, first held in 2018. The course typically starts and ends in Nannup, running on gravel roads in the Blackwood Valley. The 2026 edition had over 2000 participants. The town will also host the 2026 UCI Gravel World Championships in October.

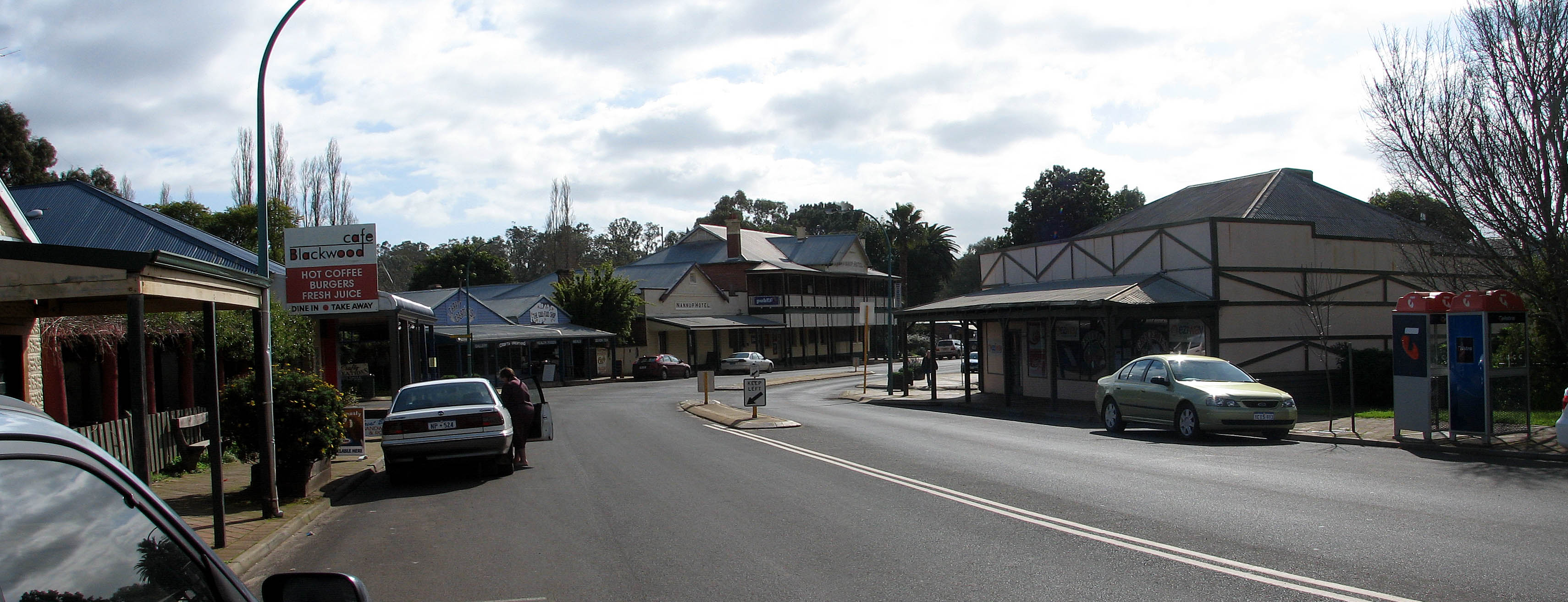
Panorama of main street in June 2007
