= Forrest Highway =

Highway in Western Australia

Forrest Highway Western Australia
- Map of Forrest Highway, highlighted in red, and surrounding road network between Perth and Bunbury

General information
- Type: Highway
- Length: 95.67 km (59.45 mi)
- Opened: 20 September 2009
- History: Old Coast Road opened 1842
- Route number(s): State Route 2 (Ravenswood – Lake Clifton); National Route 1 (Lake Clifton – East Bunbury)

Major junctions
- North end: Kwinana Freeway (State Route 2), Ravenswood
- Pinjarra Road; Old Coast Road (National Route 1), Lake Clifton; Wilman Wadandi Highway (State Route 101), Australind; Old Coast Road (Tourist Drive 260), Pelican Point
- South end: Robertson Drive (National Route 1 / State Route 10), East Bunbury

Location(s)
- Major settlements: South Yunderup, Lake Clifton, Myalup, Binningup, Leschenault, Australind

Highway system
- Highways in Australia; National Highway • Freeways in Australia; Highways in Western Australia

Forrest Highway is a 95-kilometre-long (59 mi) highway in Western Australia's Peel and South West regions, extending Perth's Kwinana Freeway from east of Mandurah down to Bunbury. Old Coast Road was the original Mandurah–Bunbury route, dating back to the 1840s. Part of that road, and the Australind Bypass around Australind and Eaton, were subsumed by Forrest Highway. The highway begins at Kwinana Freeway's southern terminus in Ravenswood, continues around the Peel Inlet to Lake Clifton, and heads south to finish at Bunbury's Eelup Roundabout. There are a number of at-grade intersections with minor roads in the shires of Murray, Waroona, and Harvey including Greenlands Road and Old Bunbury Road, both of which connect to South Western Highway near Pinjarra.

The settlement of Australind by the Western Australian Land Company in 1840–41 prompted the first real need for a good quality road to Perth. A coastal Australind–Mandurah route was completed by 2 November 1842. Though the road was rebuilt by convicts in the 1850s, its importance was already declining. With a new road via Pinjarra at the foothills of the Darling Scarp completed in 1876, and the opening of the Perth−Bunbury railway in 1893, few people travelled up the old coastal road. In the late 1930s there was a proposal to re-establish the road as a tourist route, which could also reduce traffic on the main road along the foothills, but it was put on hold due to World War II. Improvements to Old Coast Road started in the early 1950s, but with little progress made until 1954 when the Main Roads Department approved £1000 worth of works. The name "Old Coast Road" was formally adopted on 27 January 1959, and a sealed road was completed in September 1969.

Since the 1980s, the state government has been upgrading the main Perth to Bunbury route, by extending Kwinana Freeway south from Perth, and constructing a dual carriageway on Old Coast Road north of Bunbury, including bypasses around Australind and Dawesville. A bypass was also planned around Mandurah, which underwent detailed environmental reviews and assessments in the 1990s and early 2000s. Construction of the New Perth Bunbury Highway project, which became Forrest Highway and the final Kwinana Freeway extension, began in December 2006, and the new highway was opened on 20 September 2009. In June 2014, Forrest Highway was extended south to Bunbury by renaming much of Old Coast Road as well as Australind Bypass as part of the highway.

Within one year of opening, the number of road accidents in the area had decreased significantly, but tourism and businesses in the towns on bypassed routes were also affected. There are few services alongside the highway, though a pair of roadhouses opened in 2017 south of Greenlands Road. The southern portion of the road going past Australind into Bunbury was later bypassed by the Wilman Wadandi Highway when that was opened in December 2024.

== Route description ==
View southbound on Forrest Highway in West Pinjarra

Forrest Highway is the southern section of State Route 2, continuing south from Kwinana Freeway at a folded diamond interchange with Pinjarra Road. All other intersections with the highway are at-grade, with cross roads intersected via two closely spaced T junctions. The highway, which is controlled and maintained by Main Roads Western Australia, has two lanes in each direction separated by a wide median strip, and a speed limit of 110 kilometres per hour (70 mph). The road travels south for six kilometres (4 mi), over the Murray River and through rural farmland in and beyond South Yunderup. The highway then veers south-west, meeting Greenlands Road at a pair of staggered T junctions, and continues towards the Harvey Estuary over a distance of nine kilometres (6 mi) before intersecting Mills Road, at another pair of closely spaced T junctions. The road curves back to the south, reaching Old Bunbury Road after ten kilometres (6.2 mi). Forrest Highway meanders across the Spearwood dune system for ten and a half kilometres (6.5 mi), through a series of large curves, before it reaches Old Coast Road at Lake Clifton, an alternative coastal route to Mandurah.

View northbound on Forrest Highway in Lake Clifton

Forrest Highway continues south for 25 kilometres (16 mi), to the west of Myalup State Forest and two to three kilometres (1.2 to 1.9 mi) east of Lake Preston. A further 12 kilometres (7.5 mi) takes the highway to the northern edge of Leschenault. In these sections, the highway passes turnoffs to Preston Beach, Myalup and Binningup. The countryside for this part is mostly tuart, jarrah and marri forest, with some wetland vegetation and some cleared farming land. The highway then heads south-east, going inland to bypass the developed areas east of the Leschenault Inlet. After five and a half kilometres (3.4 mi) Forrest Highway crosses the Brunswick River, continues southwards towards the Collie River for another five and a half kilometres (3.4 mi). It crosses the river, then curves around Eaton to head westward to the Eelup Roundabout, which it reaches after travelling for nine kilometres (5.6 mi) and crossing the adjacent Preston River. The signalised roundabout provides access into Bunbury, as well as to Robertson Road, a ring road that connects to South Western Highway and Bussell Highway.

When the highway was first opened in 2009, the average daily weekday traffic volume north of Old Bunbury Road was 9,680. By April 2011, it had increased to 10,660 vehicles. In 2012 up to 14,000 vehicles per day used the highway, and 17,000 by 2014.

== History ==
=== Background ===
Following the establishment of the Swan River Colony, the earliest report of exploration of the district around what is now Bunbury is from Lieutenant H. W. Bunbury in December 1836. The route he – and later others – took was slow and hazardous, taking four days to cover around 130 kilometres (80 mi), and crossing four rivers. The route began with passage from Perth to Pinjarra, before turning south-west and passing through low, open scrubland, and a medium-timbered area with low marshes. The first river to cross was the Harvey River, which could only be forded by horses at a single point, near the river mouth. Continuing south-westward, the northern tip of Leschenault Estuary was reached, and its shores followed before curving around into Bunbury. The last stretch of approximately 19 kilometres (12 mi) was the most dangerous for many years, as it required precarious crossings at the Collie and Preston Rivers.

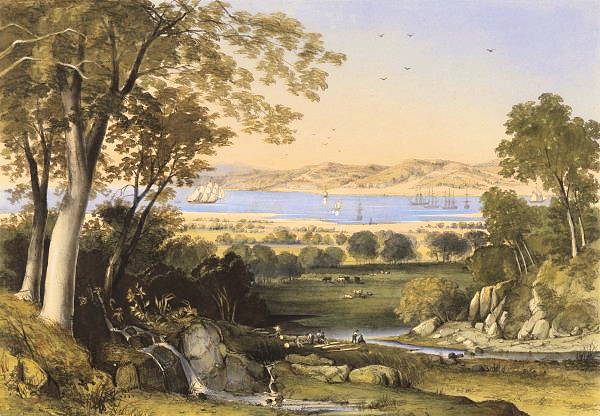
1840 depiction of Koombana Bay, Port Leschenault. Settlement around this area prompted the first real need for a good quality road.

In an initial attempt to settle the area, the government declared the land open for pastoral settlement by ordinary settlers, but little progress was made. By 1840, the population was just fifty-three, and most of those were in or near Bunbury (then known as Port Leschenault). The settlement of Australind by the Western Australian Land Company in 1840–41 prompted the first real need for a good quality road to Perth. Throughout much of 1842, there was much debate and discussion over providing a new route to Bunbury. A coastal route from Fremantle had been proposed, while an alternative proposal published on 11 May was a new route from Pinjarra to Bunbury, via an upstream crossing of the Harvey River, where a bridge could easily be built. The coastal route would have required a ferry to cross the Murray River's estuary, (Note: Now known as the Peel Harvey Estuary) and would not go through Pinjarra, a significant settlement in the area; however, it would be shorter, had more water along the route, and would go through the village of Mandurah, which had a population of twenty-nine people from six families.

In a letter dated 12 June 1842 in the Colonial Secretary's Records, Marshall Waller Clifton, Chief Commissioner of the Western Australian Land Company, wrote of the need for an improved Perth–Fremantle–Bunbury road. On a special trip he took in the previous October to look for a new route, two surveyors gave their approval to the proposed coastal route, with a ferry across the estuary. Governor John Hutt approved of the idea of a road, but thought a ferry would be impractical, at least during winter, and that the lack of public funds made it impossible. Clifton continued to write letters to the Colonial Secretary advocating the construction of a road.

=== 19th century road ===
During the winter of 1842, the existing route became impassable, and Clifton undertook the creation of the proposed coastal route. He sent his company's men to clear the path and make a road. The first report of the new road was on 19 October, praising the new route but deriding the almost impassable obstacles presented by the large rivers en route. The Australind–Mandurah route was completed by 2 November, and the speed of the new route allowed almost daily communication. It could be travelled in 32 hours, with a ferry to cross the estuary at Mandurah. The ferry was operated, and later owned, by nearby resident Mrs Lyttleton, as the government was not interested at that time in owning or leasing out the ferry. The government later appropriated the ferry on 2 February 1843, and imposed standardised tolls for passengers and livestock. Ten years later, the ferry service was made available to the public free of charge.

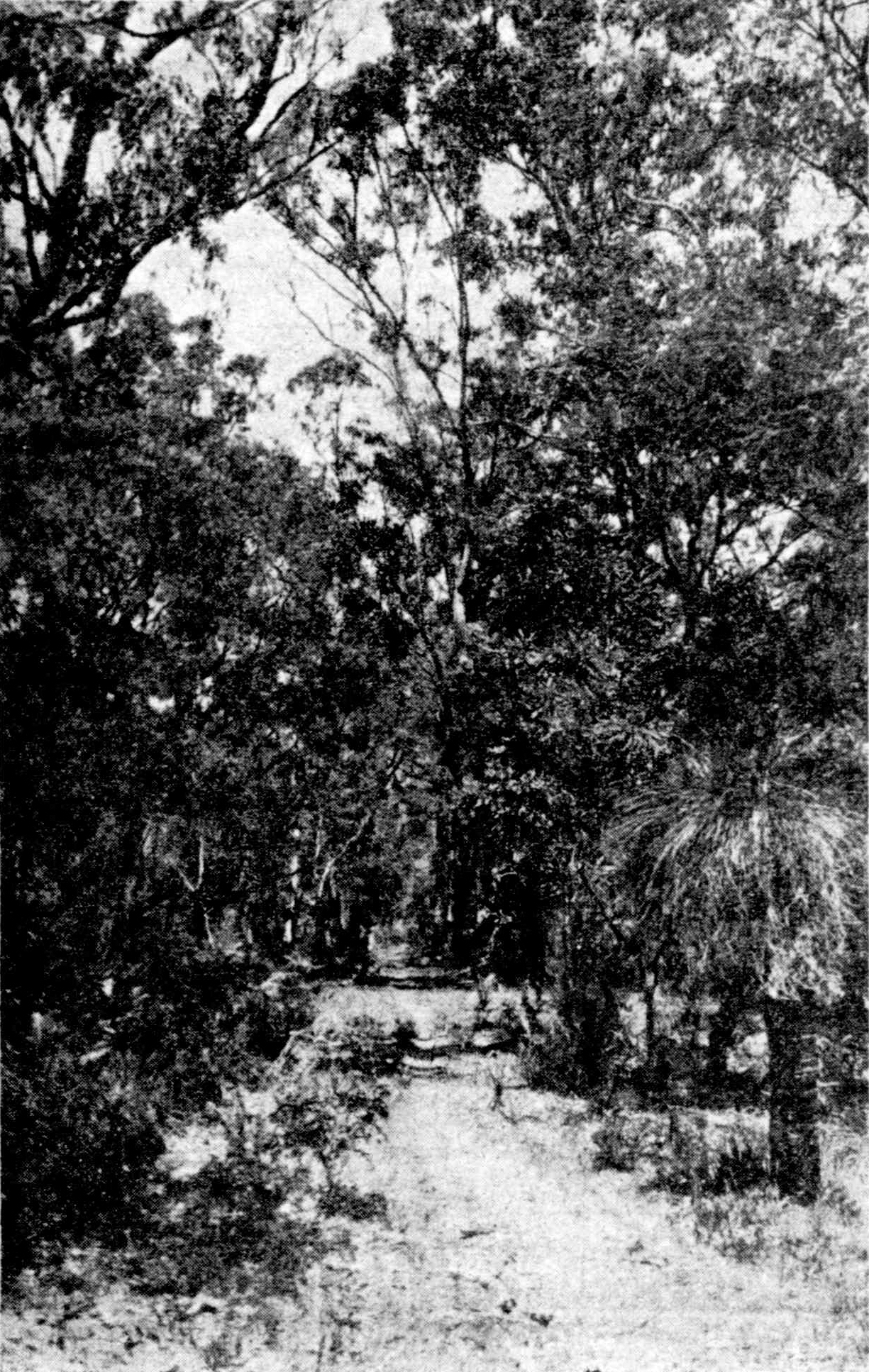
The track of Old Coast Road in 1920

The road was rebuilt by convicts in the 1850s, but by that decade, the importance of the coast road was diminishing. For most of its length, the road went through well-timbered, sandy limestone country of little value to agriculture, and settlers in the vicinity of the road were scarce. In contrast, settlements had spread and prospered in the foothills of the Darling Scarp, and on 1 July 1853, Colonial Secretary Frederick Barlee announced a new proposal for a Perth–Pinjarra–Bunbury route along the foothills, with a one chain (66 ft; 20 m) width, mostly following the alignment of previous tracks. Between 1864 and 1876, two parties of convicts were involved in the making of the road.

From 30 June 1868, the government discontinued the ferry's operation and the position of caretaker, leaving travellers to work the ferry themselves. The news was not well received, with newspaper letters complaining of the great inconvenience to the users of the shorter coastal route. As a result, the government reappointed a caretaker on 30 March 1869. In 1894 the ferry was finally abandoned in favour of a 600-foot-long (180 m) wooden bridge adjacent to old ferry jetties, which was built by contract at a cost of £1700. However, following the completion of the Perth–Bunbury railway in 1893, few people travelled up the coast road. While the adjacent land was still privately owned, it was uninhabited.

=== Early 20th century ===
Within the first few years of the twentieth century, the road had become known as "the old coast road", or simply Old Coast Road. In 1907, the road was described as being seldom used, except by tramps, runaway sailors, and swagmen, with very few settlers in the area. For the next three decades, there was little interest in the road, other than maintaining it in a usable condition. By 1918 it had become almost impassable, so the Harvey Road Board decided to spend £300 to reconstruct a 30-chain (2,000 ft; 600 m) length. A few years later, in 1921, the section from Lake Clifton to Mandurah was reopened by Jack Ochiltree, so as to be suitable for motor vehicles, and in 1926 the section from Bunbury to Lake Preston was similarly suitable.

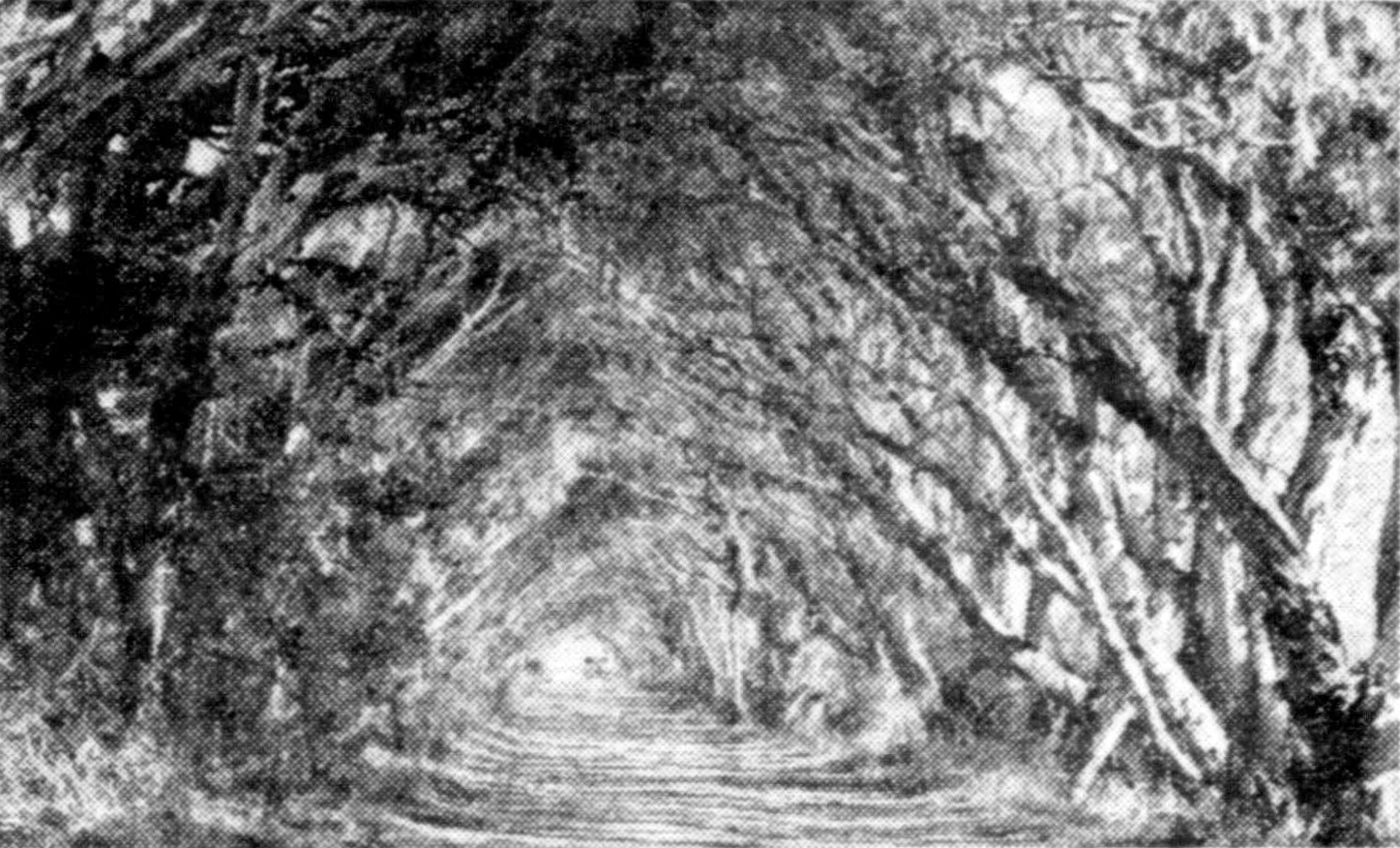
An arch of paperbarks over Old Coast Road in 1936

The establishment of a tourist route along the coastal road between Australind and Mandurah was proposed in the late 1930s by the Harvey Road Board. The Bunbury Road Board supported the idea, with the beauty and pleasure of the route discussed at a meeting of the road board in January 1939; the lack of a proper road surface was seen as the only obstacle. Traffic was predicted to grow over the next five years to an extent that would justify a second route to Perth, particularly as the traffic volume on the existing inland road was already heavy and causing accidents. The Minister for Works, Harry Millington, considered the proposal in July 1939, and by early 1940 a number of rumours emerged regarding the imminent commencement of works; however, the Main Roads Department had no intention to undertake them. The Harvey Road Board decided to refrain from pursuing the matter until World War II had concluded. By 1943, vegetation was overgrowing the road, making it difficult to spot in places, and in December 1946 about 200 yards (180 m) was inundated by water one-foot (30 cm) deep. Negotiations between Main Roads and the road boards recommenced in 1947, and by October 1948 the provision of a suitable road was costed at £280,000. Given that a good quality road already linked Perth and Bunbury, and there was likely to be little immediate benefit, Main Roads did not consider the proposal to be warranted.

At a February 1949 conference of officials from local governments in the South West region it was decided to once more pursue the reopening of the coastal route, due to the amount of traffic on the existing Perth–Bunbury road. Over the next year the proposal was supported by the Bunbury Chamber of Commerce, South West Zone Development Committee, and Bunbury Municipal Council. Reasons for supporting the proposal included "defence, land settlement, relieving the main highway, and tourist advantages". It was also a political issue leading up to the 1950 state election, as well as afterwards. The summer of 1950 had seen a shortage of milk in Perth, leading to the consideration of turning undeveloped land along Old Coast Road into pastures for dairy farming. After inspecting the land on 17 May 1950, the Agriculture Minister advocated for Old Coast Road to be reopened, to develop the adjacent land which was well suited to milk production.

=== New construction in the 1950s ===
An official inspection in October 1950 reported that it would not be difficult to improve the old road into a reasonable track, which would then have a better chance of attracting assistance from Main Roads. The Mandurah Road Board spent £1200 on the road, while the Harvey Road Board requested a £500 grant from Main Roads for their portion of the road. Two years later little progress had been made, and Main Roads therefore refused to fund feeder roads to connect to Old Coast Road. By May 1952, works had halted as Main Roads believed that the existing, winding route around the estuary was too prone to flooding. Settlers in the area recalled it never flooding previously, and the Mandurah Road Board was concerned that should a new road be built, they would still have to maintain the old road for access to properties. The road was inspected by the Premier, Deputy-Commissioner of Main Roads J. D. Leach, and the district engineer H. A. Smith. They indicated that a new road would likely closely follow the old road, but that a detailed survey would be needed. Nearby limestone deposits would be suitable for the road's foundation, with the cost estimated at £11 per chain.

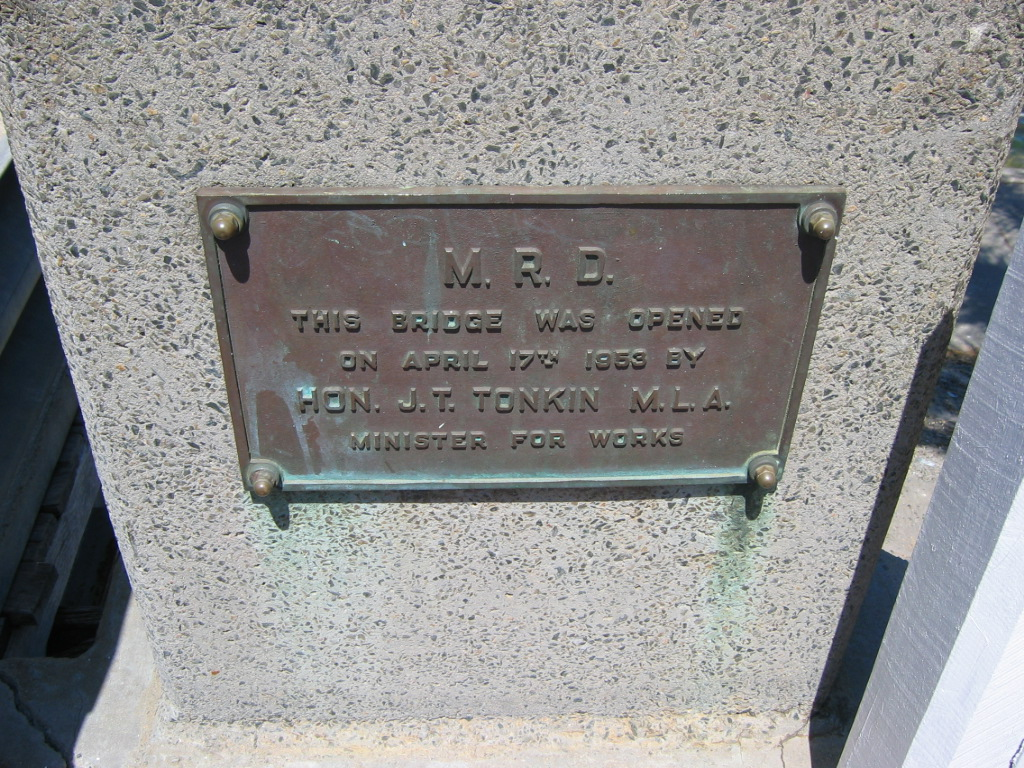
Plaque commemorating the opening of the new Mandurah bridge

Mandurah had grown rapidly as a tourist destination in the post war period, and on 17 April 1953 a new bridge connecting Old Coast Road to Mandurah was opened. Construction of the new bridge, adjacent to the old bridge, began in September 1951, and was designed with reinforced concrete piles. The old wooden bridge had rapidly deteriorated due to the presence of marine organisms, and needed considerable attention to maintain it in a usable condition. The opening ceremony was attended by the Chairman of the Mandurah Road Board, W. Anderson, Leader of the Opposition, Ross McLarty, Minister for Works, John Tonkin; Commissioner of Main Roads, Digby Leach; C. H. Henning, MLC; engineer in charges of bridges, Ernest Godfrey; local government representatives, and a number of schoolchildren who were given a half-day off school.

No further work had been done on Old Coast Road by 1954, as the road boards in the area had insufficient funds. More pressure for a new road came from the Education Department, which saw the need for a school bus in the area, but could not provide the service due to the poor condition of Old Coast Road. Leach, who was by then the Commissioner, indicated that Main Roads would likely approve requests for grants to improve Old Coast road from the road boards in the area, and that provision for funding had been made in the 1954–55 budget. Work was finally cleared to commence in September 1954 with Main Roads approving the Mandurah Road Board's schedule of works, including £1000 for the following works on Old Coast Road:

"New construction 18 ft [5.5 m] wide southwards from Yeedong-rd, and new construction 12 ft [3.7 m] wide along the eastern boundary of Location 1130 from the end of the existing construction to the northern boundary of Reserve 2851."

The name "Old Coast Road" was formally adopted on 27 January 1959, and a sealed road was completed in September 1969.

=== Perth Bunbury Highway ===
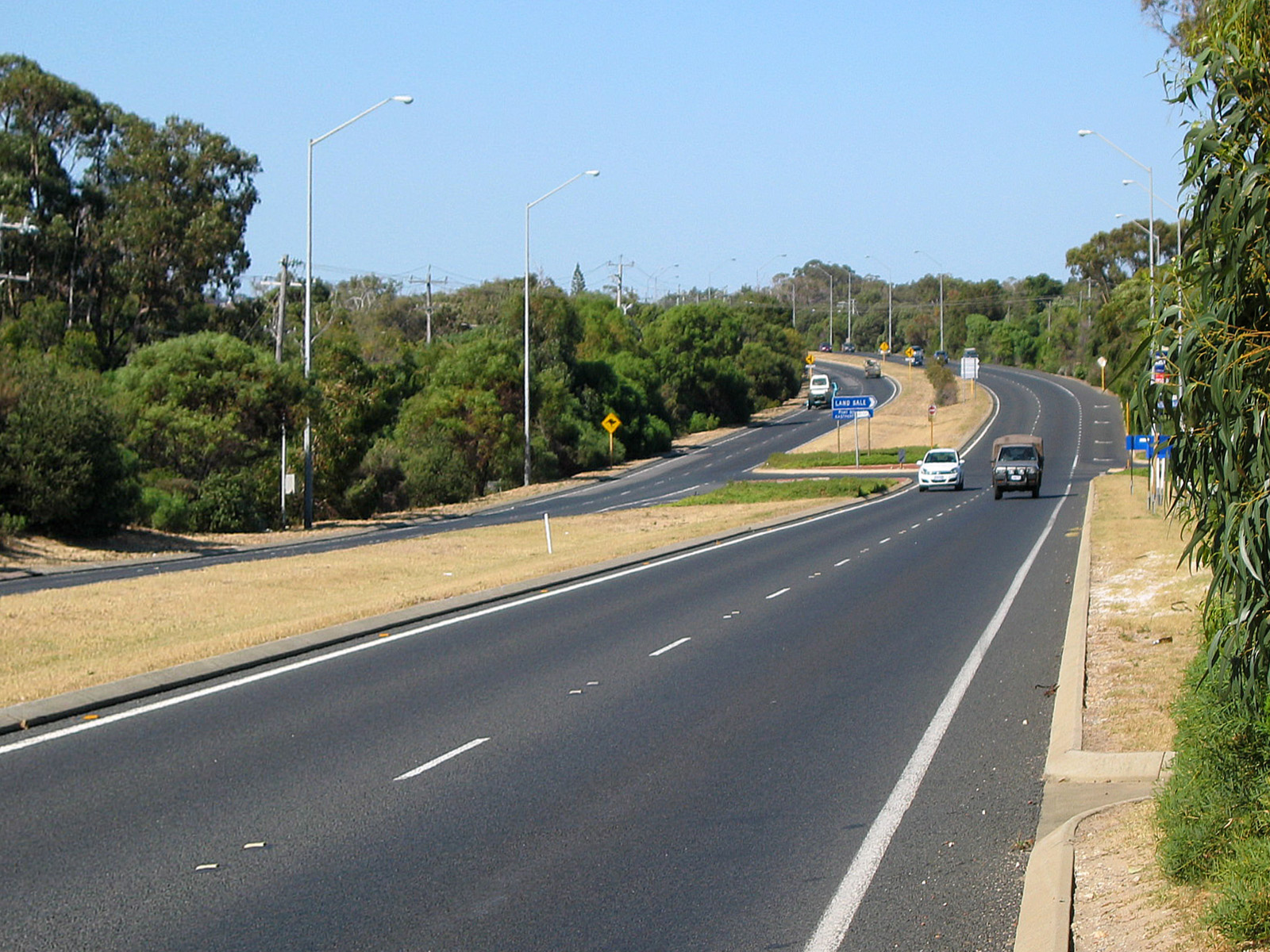
Dual carriageway section of Old Coast Road south of Mandurah

Since the 1980s, the state government has been committed to constructing and upgrading the Perth Bunbury Highway, (Note: Also known as Perth–Bunbury Highway) a route along coastal roads, including Old Coast Road south of Mandurah. The ultimate design is for a freeway or expressway-standard road, but with staged construction initially providing a dual carriageway.

==== Australind Bypass ====
The 20.5-kilometre-long (12.7 mi) Australind Bypass was constructed in the 1980s to relieve pressure on Old Coast Road, and improve local amenity. The bypass travelled to the east and south of Australind and Eaton, to connect to Bunbury's Eelup Roundabout via an alignment previously part of Jubilee Road. There were slight deviations in the route to protect remnant paperbark trees, tuarts, acacia, and aquatic plants, as well as a site of Aboriginal importance, identified by botanical and Aboriginal heritage surveys. Australind Bypass was built in two stages by the Bunbury Division of Main Roads. The first stage opened on 11 December 1987, and was a 4.7-kilometre (2.9 mi) length from Eelup Roundabout to Eaton Drive, plus a 2-kilometre (1.2 mi) link from the bypass (north of the rail line) and the Collie River bridge on Old Coast Road. Stage two, the remaining 15.8 kilometres (9.8 mi) to reconnect with Old Coast Road, (Note: Old Coast Road in Leschenault was previously routed along modern-day Cathedral Avenue) was completed ahead of schedule in December 1988.

Australind Bypass was opened on 16 December 1988 by Federal Transport Minister Bob Brown, who helped complete the final seal, together with the Mayor of Bunbury Ern Manea. State Transport Minister Bob Pearce planted a roadside tree to commemorate the opening of the bypass, which was also attended by the Commissioner of Main Roads Albert Tognolini, and Mitchell MLA David Smith, Minister for the South West. Vintage cars led a procession from the on-site opening ceremony to a reception held in Bunbury. The new road was designed to be easily made into a dual carriageway when required; this was completed nine years later, with the Australind Bypass duplication project officially opened by Mitchell MLA Dan Sullivan on 18 December 1997.

==== Dual carriageway sections ====
In addition to the Australind Bypass, much of Old Coast Road was upgraded to a dual carriageway. A 7.2-kilometre-long (4.5 mi) second carriageway through Halls Head and Falcon was opened in 1989. Two further dual carriageway sections, from Harvey to Myalup, and around Glen Iris, opened on 17 June 1996. The dual carriageway was extended up to Lake Clifton c. December 2000. Construction of the dual carriageway Dawesville Bypass around eastern Dawesville, south of Mandurah, began in late 2000, and was opened in July 2001.

=== New Perth Bunbury Highway ===
While Old Coast Road's dual carriageway was advancing north from Bunbury, and Kwinana Freeway was progressively being extended south from Perth, the alignment through Mandurah was constrained by existing development. Keeping the existing alignment would result in a traffic bottleneck through Mandurah. To overcome this problem, Main Roads began planning for a new route east of the Peel Inlet in the 1980s.

Entering the highway from the Pinjarra Road interchange, and travelling south over Pinjarra Road and the Murray River

The proposed Perth Bunbury Highway Peel deviation, part of which later became an extension to Kwinana Freeway, underwent a public environmental review in 1997, and an environmental assessment by the Environmental Protection Authority (EPA) in 2000. The relevant environment factors considered by the EPA were vegetation communities, declared rare and priority flora, wetlands, and traffic noise. Main Roads proposed management plans for each factor. Only clearing of vegetation critical for road construction would be undertaken, and more vegetation would be replaced than the amount impacted, using local native species. A survey for declared rare and priority flora found no rare species, and only one priority species, Lasiopetalum membranaceum, near the southern end of the project. Road construction would impact one conservation class wetland, but no protected wetlands. To minimise impact, road drainage would be designed to contain spills and prevent direct discharges into the surrounding environment. Noise levels would be contained to an acceptable limit in the road design, in accordance with the Main Roads traffic noise policy. The EPA concluded that the road could be designed and managed to an acceptable standard. Main Roads' 2006 plan for environmental management of the project included numerous aspects, which for the northern segment of the project exceeded the environmental approval requirements. Specific plans were developed regarding fauna, topsoil management, construction, foreshores, and both Aboriginal and European heritage.

Construction of the highway and freeway extension began in December 2006, with the whole project then called the New Perth Bunbury Highway. The work was undertaken by a partnership of Main Roads, Leighton Contractors, WA Limestone and GHD, known as the Southern Gateway Alliance. The project consisted of a 32-kilometre (20 mi) freeway-standard extension as far as South Yunderup Road in South Yunderup, and a 38-kilometre (24 mi) highway-standard dual carriageway to Old Coast Road at Lake Clifton. Taking traffic around the eastern side of the Peel-Harvey Estuary prior to joining the existing dual carriageway on Old Coast Road reduced the journey time from Perth to Bunbury. (Note: According to the Southern Gateway Alliance, the partnership between Main Roads Western Australia, Leighton Contractors, WA Limestone and GHD that designed and constructed the New Perth Bunbury Highway project) The final road names were not known until early 2009, when Transport Minister Simon O'Brien revealed that the section south of Pinjarra Road would be known as Forrest Highway, with the section to the north to become part of Kwinana Freeway. The highway's name commemorates Sir John Forrest, the state's first premier. The Kwinana Freeway extension and Forrest Highway were opened on 20 September 2009, with a ceremony held at the interchange between the freeway, highway, and Pinjarra Road. The roads were officially opened by Premier Colin Barnett, Senator Chris Evans, Transport Minister Simon O'Brien, Member for Canning Don Randall, and the former Planning and Infrastructure Minister Alannah MacTiernan. The $705 million project (equivalent to $873 million in 2018) was jointly funded by the state and federal governments, which contributed $375 million and $330 million respectively (equivalent to $464 million and $409 million in 2018). At the time it opened, it was Western Australia's largest ever road infrastructure project.

=== Forrest Highway after opening ===
External audio
- Forrest Highway: One year after opening – interviews
- Main Roads regional manager Brett Bellstead (MP3)
- Harvey Shire president Peter Monagle (MP3)
- Harvey cheese maker Robert St Duke (MP3); Radio interviews conducted by ABC South West WA presenter Ron Tait.

One year after Forrest Highway opened, the number of road accidents on the main roads in the area had decreased by 60%. Traffic on South Western Highway had reduced by 50% north of Pinjarra, and by 20% to the south, and there was an 82% reduction along Old Coast Road within a month of the new highway opening. However, tourism in towns along the former routes was affected by the reduced traffic flow, with businesses losing as much as 60% of their trade.

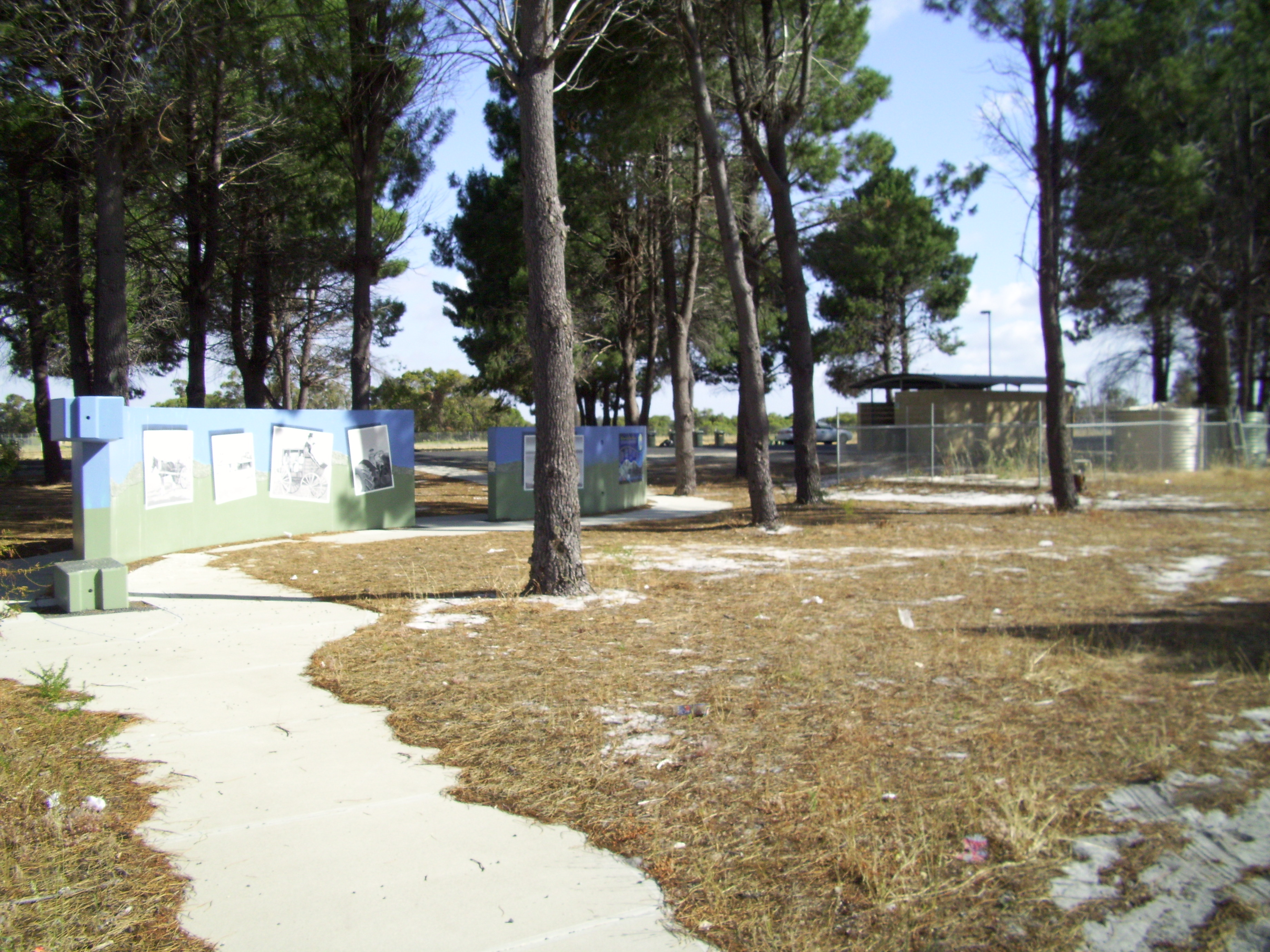
The John Tognela Rest Area

Forrest Highway has been criticised for the lack of roadside facilities. In January 2014, it was described as "the busiest, most unserviced, long stretch of highway in the nation" by MP Murray Cowper, Member for Murray-Wellington. With public toilets initially only available at the John Tognela Rest Area near the southern end of the highway, travellers have reportedly stopped alongside the highway or side roads to urinate and change nappies. A farming family with property adjacent to the highway was willing to invest in a roadhouse near Herron Point, but Main Roads required roadhouses to be built on both sides of the highway. According to Cowper, traffic volume would need to increase from 17,000 to 30,000 vehicles per day to justify such an investment.

A few months later, in April 2014, a Perth developer had begun constructing twin roadhouses five kilometres (3 mi) south of Greenlands Road, approximately halfway between Perth and Bunbury. The property was purchased in 2004, before construction began on the highway, with the intention of developing the site when there was a viable amount of traffic. The facilities, which consists of a national fuel retailer and food and beverage outlets along with other amenities located on both sides of the highway, were initially expected to be completed by the end of 2014, but work was put on hold due to a legal dispute between the developer and landowner. Development resumed in June 2015, and the twin roadhouses opened in late 2017.

On 5 June 2014, the Geographic Names Committee renamed the roads that connect Forrest Highway to Bunbury – part of Old Coast Road as well as Australind Bypass – as part of the highway. The renaming had been proposed in 2013 due to public confusion over the three names used for the route to Bunbury: Forrest Highway to Lake Clifton, Old Coast Road from there to north of Australind, and then Australind Bypass. Emergency services had difficulty locating incidents due to the confusion. The renaming followed similar changes to Main Roads' internal-use designations in May 2011, which deprecated Perth Bunbury Highway (Highway H2) in favour of Melville Mandurah Highway (Highway H2) for the portion north of Mandurah, Lakeland Lake Clifton Road (Main Road M74) for the Mandurah to Lake Clifton section together with Mandjoogoordap Drive, and an extension of Forrest Highway (Highway H57) for the Lake Clifton to Bunbury portion. Changes to the road signs were expected to be completed by mid-July. The renaming was considered unusual, as it affected a significant length of a major road, which was the address of eleven residential properties.

The southern section of Forrest Highway, from Paris Road in Australind to the Eelup Roundabout, was bypassed by the Wilman Wadandi Highway upon the latter's opening in 2024. The Paris Road intersection was changed into a grade-separated junction between Forrest and Wilman Wadandi Highways, Paris Road, and Clifton Road. The interchange split Forrest Highway into two sections, with the northern section of the highway continuing south as Wilman Wadandi Highway with traffic wanting to continue along the southern part of the highway into Bunbury having to take an looped exit ramp. This aspect of the design was contentious, as the City of Bunbury wanted for Forrest Highway to be continuous so that more traffic would head into the centre of Bunbury. Only the northbound entrance and southbound exit ramps will be built, with the southbound exit ramp being a loop ramp so that traffic heading towards Bunbury does not have to give way to traffic on Clifton Road.

== Major intersections ==
LGA	Location	km	mi	Destinations	Notes
Murray	Ravenswood–North Yunderup boundary	0.00	0.00	Kwinana Freeway (State Route 2) north / Pinjarra Road – Perth, Mandurah, Pinjarra	Northern highway terminus; folded diamond interchange
Murray River		0.00– 0.27	0.00– 0.17	Windich Bridge	
Murray	West Pinjarra	7.92	4.92	Greenlands Road east – Pinjarra	
Waroona	Waroona	27.05	16.81	Old Bunbury Road east – Pinjarra	
Waroona	Waroona	28.78	17.88	Old Bunbury Road west – Lake Clifton	
Waroona	Lake Clifton	37.61	23.37	Old Coast Road (National Route 1) northwest – Mandurah	Route transition: State Route 2 southern terminus, National Route 1 continues south along Forrest Highway
Harvey	Myalup	58.19	36.16	Forestry Road – Harvey	
Harvey	Leschenault	76.84	47.75	Old Coast Road (Tourist Drive 260) south – Australind	
Brunswick River		79.91– 79.96	49.65– 49.68	Bridge over river	
Harvey	Australind–Brunswick boundary	81.80	50.83	Wilman Wadandi Highway south (State Route 101) / Paris Road west / Clifton Road east – Australind	Partial Roundabout interchange with northbound entry and exit ramps. Forrest Highway is free flowing southwards via a looped ramp.
Collie River		85.37– 85.50	53.05– 53.13	Bridge over river	
Bunbury	Pelican Point	91.32	56.74	Old Coast Road (Tourist Drive 260) north – Eaton, Pelican Point, Australind	Traffic light intersection
Bunbury	Glen Iris–Vittoria boundary	92.00	57.17	Alyxia Road southeast / Thomson Road northwest to Willinge Drive – Glen Iris, Vittoria, Picton	Traffic light intersection
Preston River		94.13– 94.18	58.49– 58.52	Bridge over river	
Bunbury	East Bunbury	95.67	59.45	Robertson Drive (National Route 1 / State Route 10) south / Sandridge Road west / Koombana Drive north – Bunbury, Donnybrook, Busselton	Eelup Roundabout (traffic light controlled); southern highway terminus
Route transition

== Old Coast Road ==
While much of Old Coast Road was renamed Forrest Highway in 2014, bypassed sections of the former Perth Bunbury Highway near Mandurah and Australind have retained the name Old Coast Road, and have significance as part of numbered road routes.

=== Mandurah – Lake Clifton ===
Old Coast Road
- Location: Mandurah – Lake Clifton
- Length: 44.3 km (27.5 mi)
- Route number: National Route 1

Old Coast Road starts at the intersection of Mandurah Terrace and Pinjarra Road in Mandurah. It crosses the Mandurah estuary into Halls Head via the 184-metre-long (604 ft) Mandurah Bridge. The road heads south-west as a two-lane road serving the canal estate in eastern Halls Head. After 1.7 kilometres (1.1 mi) Old Coast Road intersects Mandurah Road at a T junction. Mandurah Road and Old Coast Road south-westbound form a continuous dual carriageway, and from here Old Coast Road is part of National Route 1. The road then proceeds through Mandurah's southern suburbs of Falcon and Wannanup for 8.7 kilometres (5.4 mi) before bridging the Dawesville Channel. After 1.3 kilometres (0.81 mi), Old Coast Road turns south to run through eastern Dawesville as a single carriageway; about 500 metres (0.31 mi) to the west the dual carriageway also travels south as Dawesville Bypass. The two routes meet again after three and a half kilometres (2.2 mi). Old Coast Road is briefly a dual carriageway for 700 metres (0.43 mi) before reducing to a 28-kilometre-long (17 mi) two-lane road through Bouvard, Herron and Lake Clifton. The road terminates at a T junction with Forrest Highway.

=== Leschenault – Pelican Point ===
Old Coast Road
- Location: Leschenault – Pelican Point
- Length: 11.7 km (7.3 mi)
- Route number: Tourist Drive 260

While Forrest Highway bypasses Australind, there is a turn off for Old Coast Road and Tourist Drive 260 at Leschenault. The road heads south through the residential suburb for three and a half kilometres (2.2 mi) before going through a 1.4-kilometre-long (0.87 mi) reverse curve. Now at the eastern edge of the Leschenault Inlet, Old Coast Road enters Australind and travels along the shoreline for nine and a half kilometres (5.9 mi). The road crosses the Collie River, and 600 metres (0.37 mi) later there is a roundabout with Estuary Drive and Hamilton Road. The tourist drive follows Estuary Drive to Bunbury, while Old Coast Road continues south for 1.4 kilometres (0.87 mi) to rejoin Forrest Highway at the south-eastern edge of Pelican Point.
