= List of State Register of Heritage Places in the Shire of Harvey =

State Register of Heritage Place in Western Australia

The State Register of Heritage Places is maintained by the Heritage Council of Western Australia. As of 2026, 283 places are heritage-listed in the Shire of Harvey, of which nine are on the State Register of Heritage Places.

== List ==
The Western Australian State Register of Heritage Places, as of 2026, lists the following nine state registered places within the Shire of Harvey:

Place name	Place #	Location	Suburb or town	Co-ordinates	Built	State registered	Notes	Photo
Alverstoke	4536	484 Clifton Road	Brunswick Junction	33°15′44″S 115°47′40″E	1840	5 January 2001	Substantial collection of farm buildings, established in the first two decades of European settlement in Western Australia, originally owned by Marshall Waller Clifton	
Church of St Nicholas	1188	Lot 324 Paris Road	Australind	33°16′44″S 115°42′56″E	1841	15 December 2009	Also referred to as Congregational Church, Narroway's Cottage and The Little Church); A single-storey timber building in Old Colonial Georgian style, originally build as a residence	
Harvey Agricultural College (former)	25228	25 James Stirling Place	Harvey	33°04′36″S 115°54′47″E	1940	6 January 2017	Also referred to as 3rd Australian Corps Training School and No. 11 Internment Camp; Inter-War Spanish Mission style, the first purpose built internment camp in Western Australia	
Henton Cottage	1189	301 Old Coast Road	Australind	33°16′45″S 115°42′56″E	1842	31 March 2006	Also referred to as Allnutt Cottage and Prince of Wales Hotel; A single storey timber-framed building in the Old Colonial Georgian style	
Italian Prisoner of War Shrine at Harvey Agricultural High School	3168	11011 South Western Highway	Harvey	33°04′28″S 115°54′37″E			Also referred to as Internment Camp Memorial Shrine; Rare example of a roadside shrine built in Australia; Part of Harvey Agricultural College Precinct (25228)	
Replica of the Hut Homestead	11998	25 James Stirling Place	Harvey	33°04′36″S 115°54′38″E	1994		Also referred to as The Hut and Captain Stirling's Hunting Lodge; Replica of the Stirling Cottage, associated with author May Gibbs; Part of Harvey Agricultural College Precinct (25228)	
St Joseph's Church & Cottage	1205	Johnston Road	Yarloop	32°57′13″S 115°54′07″E	1906	1 October 2002	Also referred to as Community Centre and St John the Baptist Church; A timber and corrugated iron church and cottage; Destroyed in the January 2016 Waroona fire	
Upton House	1187	4 Upton Place	Australind	33°16′37″S 115°42′57″E	1844	11 December 1998	A relatively rare example of a two-storeyed housing form of a degree of sophistication and skill not readily available to the general community at the time; Residence of Marshall Clifton from 1847 who had purchased it two years earlier	
Yarloop Timber Mill Workshops	1203	Railway Parade	Yarloop	32°57′34″S 115°54′01″E	1895	12 May 2000	Also referred to as Yarloop Mill Town Central Area; Was the largest timber industry workshop in Western Australia; Destroyed in the January 2016 Waroona fire	
