= Wellesley, Western Australia =

Wellesley
- Suburb
- Interactive map of Wellesley
- Coordinates: 33°12′58″S 115°45′25″E
- Country: Australia
- State: Western Australia
- City: Bunbury
- LGA: Shire of Harvey
- Location: 26 km (16 mi) from Bunbury

Government
  - State electorate: Murray-Wellington
  - Federal division: Forrest

Area
  - Total: 50 km^{2} (19 sq mi)

Population
  - Total: 35 (SAL 2021)
- Postcode: 6233
Suburbs around Wellesley
Binningup		Benger
Parkfield	Wellesley	Brunswick Junction
Leschenault	Australind

Wellesley is a locality in the Bunbury region of Western Australia, about 10 km north-east of Australind. Its local government area is the Shire of Harvey. It is bordered on the south and east by the Brunswick River and the Wellesley River. The main feature of the locality is the Kemerton Industrial Park.

== Kemerton Industrial Park ==
The estate was established in 1985 as a "strategic industrial area" to provide appropriate buffered land for heavy industry. It covers an area of 7543 ha, comprising an industrial core of 2100 ha, a support industry area of 300 ha, an inter-industry buffer of 175 ha and a buffer area of 5437 ha which includes bushland, wetland, protection zones and recreational areas. A rail link connecting with the Perth-Bunbury railway is proposed. It is coordinated by the Department of Industry and Resources (WA), South West Development Commission and the Shire of Harvey.

=== History ===
Little is known of the area prior to 1980 - a report in 1988 noted that (p. 9) "although mainly a rural area, a significant portion of the Kemerton site remains undeveloped", and there was "very little agricultural development other than the use of the land for seasonal grazing", possibly due to poor soils and inadequate drainage. The report noted a piggery and an abattoir, the latter of which is still in operation.

=== Proposed aluminium smelter ===
In 1980, Alcoa commenced investigations into potential sites for an aluminium smelter. Preliminary documentation given to the Environmental Protection Authority (EPA) indicated that three sites - Worsley Siding, Pinjarra and Kemerton - were preferred. Alcoa subsequently withdrew from the consortium. Shortly after the election of the Burke Labor government, which had in December 1983 launched the "Bunbury 2000" strategy to develop the area, a new consortium, Kukje-ICC Construction trading as International Aluminium Consortium, ruled out Pinjarra as a site. In December 1984, the State Government acquired 3700 hectares of private land at Kemerton to act as a buffer, as the EPA had recommended Kemerton over Worsley Siding due to "fewer uncertainties of ecological interactions, a much better knowledge of potential implications and lower environmental risks". A detailed environmental impact assessment of a proposal by the consortium for a 230,000 tpa smelter was carried out in 1985, and Town Planning Scheme No.10 (Shire of Harvey) was amended to zone the land industrial, but the proposal was deferred indefinitely in 1987 for economic reasons.

=== Development of the Industrial Park ===
The rezoning and considerations led to other expressions of interest, and in 1988–1989, several other industries moved into the area and commenced operations, and a draft structure plan was submitted for State Government approval. A new consortium, led by Pennant/John Holland and Wardley Australia Ltd, proposed in February 1989 a single potline smelter with 20% less capacity than the 1985 proposal, but this did not proceed either. The Kemerton Steering Committee (later KIPCC) was formed in April 1989, and at around the same time, a trade magazine article claimed that Kemerton, with its integration of natural bushland, wetland and plantation forestry and an interpretative centre into the planning of the industrial park, "could well become a model for establishing industry as an acceptable land-user in sympathy with environmental values."

=== Industries ===
Some of the industries at Kemerton include:

- Millennium Inorganic Chemicals (formerly SCM Chemicals until 1997), a Cristal company, manufactures titanium dioxide pigment using the chlorine process from rutile, or synthetic rutile made from locally mined ilmenite. In 2004/05, 85,000 tonnes of pigment was produced at a value of approximately $300 million. The titanium dioxide pigment is then used in the production of paints, plastics, paper, rubber, printing inks, cosmetics and pharmaceuticals. The plant was established in 1990, and previously (as LaPorte/SCM) operated from Australind from 1964 to 1990 using a less environmentally palatable sulfate process producing 40,000 tonnes per year of TiO_{2}.
- BOC Limited (previously CIG) operates an air separation unit in Kemerton to supply 280 tonnes per day of oxygen and nitrogen to Millennium. The plant has liquid storage onsite and serves the Kemerton Industrial Park through the nearby Bunbury Gas and Gear.
- Nufarm-Coogee Pty Ltd, a joint venture between Nufarm Limited (80%) and Coogee Chemicals Pty Ltd (20%), operates a chlor-alkali plant to supply chlorine to the local titanium dioxide processing industry, using about 40,000 tonnes of salt to produce about 20,000 tonnes of chlorine and 20,000 tonnes of caustic soda (NaOH).
- Simcoa Operations, owned since 1996 by the Japanese Shin-Etsu Chemical Company which has interests in silicone manufacturing operations in Asia, operates the only silicon producing smelter in Australia. It was commissioned in 1989-90 by Barrack Mines, and in 2005, approximately 32,000 tonnes of premium grade silicon (predominantly 99.5% grade) was produced at an estimated value of $75 million. Silicon is used in the production of aluminium alloys, silicones and solar grade silicon wafers. Silica fume is also produced and sold as an additive for high-performance concrete
- Kemerton Silica Sand is a joint venture between the Japanese companies Itochu Corporation and Tochu Co Ltd, and has a feldspathic silica sand mine just north of the Kemerton Industrial Park. The bulk of the sand is suitable for the container glass and sheet glass industry in Japan and the Asian region, and the first shipment was despatched in July 1996. In 2004/05, 334,532 tonnes of silica sand were exported.
- Transfield Services opened the 260 megawatt Kemerton Power Station (gas-fired with diesel backup) on 1 November 2005, delivering power to the South West Interconnected System (SWIS) under a 25-year agreement with Verve Energy (an arm of WA's state power utility). The project was the first major privately owned power station to be constructed in Western Australia. A 30-year generation licence was granted under the Electricity Industry Act 2004 on 20 March 2006. Ownership of the power station transferred to RATCH-Australia in July 2011. Verve Energy became party of Synergy in 2014.
- The Water Corporation of Western Australia opened a $13 million waste water treatment plant in 2003, replacing two in nearby Australind and Eaton and is capable of treating 3 million litres of waste water per day. Some of the treated water is recycled and used to water nearby tree farms.
- Goodchild Abattoir Pty Ltd, a family-owned company, have operated an abattoir in the area since the late 1970s. 35,000 beef cattle and 225,000 sheep and lambs are processed each year.
