= Brunswick River =

Brunswick River may refer to:

- Brunswick River (Georgia), river in Georgia, USA
- Brunswick River (North Carolina), river in North Carolina, USA
- Brunswick River (New South Wales), river in New South Wales, Australia
- Brunswick River (Western Australia), tributary of Collie River in Western Australia, Australia
