= Leschenault Estuary =

Estuarine lagoon north of Bunbury, Western Australia

Coordinates: 33°15′46″S 115°41′58″E

South coast lake system between Mandurah and Bunbury. Leschenault Estuary is the southernmost of the four large estuaries and is immediately north of Bunbury. The local Bindjareb people refer to it as the Derbal Eelap.

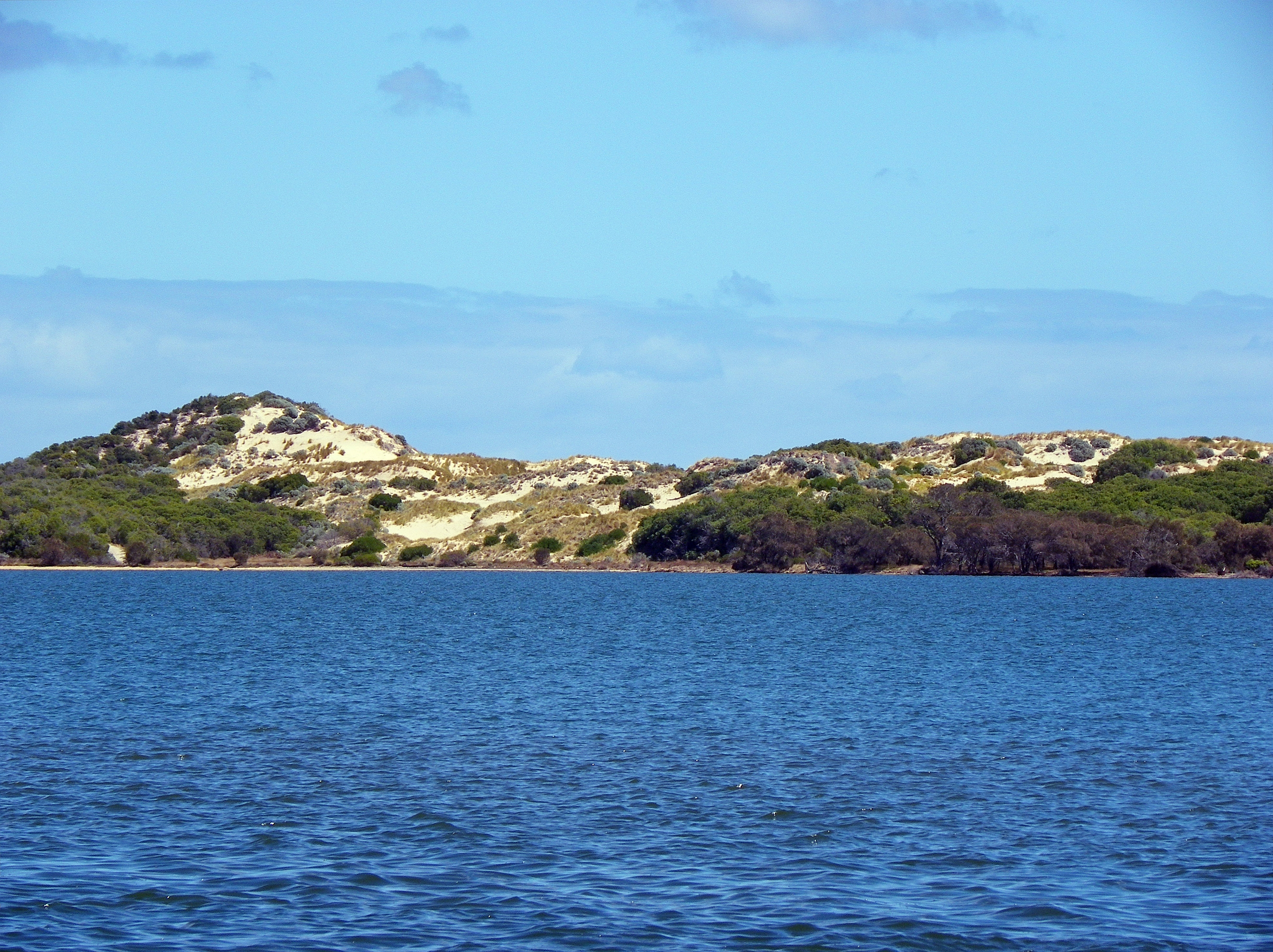
Coastal dunes on the Leschenault Peninsula

Leschenault Estuary - Derbal Eelap is an estuarine lagoon that lies to the north of Bunbury, Western Australia. It had in the past met the Indian Ocean at the Leschenault Inlet, but that has been altered by harbour works for Bunbury, and the creation of The Cut north of the historical inlet location.

The estuary is approximately 13.5 km (8.4 mi) in length and has a maximum width of approximately 2.5 km (1.6 mi). The total area of the estuary is 25 km^{2} (9.7 sq mi) The lagoon is separated from the ocean by a thin peninsula of sand dunes called the Leschenault Peninsula.

== Catchment ==
The catchment area below Wellington Dam for the estuary covers 1,981 km^{2} (765 sq mi). The catchment includes part of the Swan Coastal Plain, the Darling Scarp and the Darling Plateau.

The Collie and Preston Rivers are the main catchment rivers and enter the estuary from the southern end and with the catchment runoff discharging into the Indian Ocean via the cut in the peninsula.

Other rivers in the catchment area include the Brunswick River, Ferguson and Wellesley as well as numerous other creeks, streams and irrigation drains.

Seven local government areas are located within the catchment including Bunbury, Collie, Capel, Dardanup, Harvey, Donnybrook-Balingup and Boyup Brook. The catchment has a total population of approximately 65,000 people.

The catchment area retains 40% of its natural vegetation, the remainder of the area has been cleared mostly for agricultural purposes with some light industry.

It is part of the Kalgulup Regional Park.

== History ==
The sand dune system responsible for the formation of the estuary began about 7,000 years ago. At this time the coast section between Mandurah and Bunbury was an open rocky limestone shore. A dune system began to build on the shore forming a long barred estuarine lagoon between the current estuary as far north as Lake Preston and effectively separated the lagoon from the ocean.

About 4,500 years ago the dune system met up with the eastern shore of the estuary separating the lagoon into two sections. The northern portion filled with mud leaving the southern section as the estuary that exists today.

Pre-colonisation, it was known as the Derbal Eelap.

Construction of The Cut, a channel that opens the estuary into the ocean opposite the Collie River mouth, commenced in February 1950.

Two explosive packages were found in the inlet in 2013. The first package composed of tri-cyclic acetone peroxide was found near a jetty and taken to Gloucester Park in Perth to be detonated in a controlled explosion. Divers searched the surrounding area the following day and found another package of the same explosive that was detonated on site. Traffic along the Old Coast Road was disrupted as a result.

== Flora and fauna ==
A white mangrove colony exists within the estuary. These are the most southern mangroves in Western Australia and are believed to be 2,500 years old. The mangroves inhabit an area of 6.4 ha (16 acres). A boardwalk with informative signage has been constructed around the Mangrove colony so that visitors can inspect the area.

Waterbirds depend on the area for habitat. Up to 62 species of waterbird use the estuary, mostly feeding in the tidal salt-marshes.

The estuary is also an important fish nursery area.

== See also ==
- Leschenault, Western Australia
