= Leschenault, Western Australia =

Leschenault
- Suburb
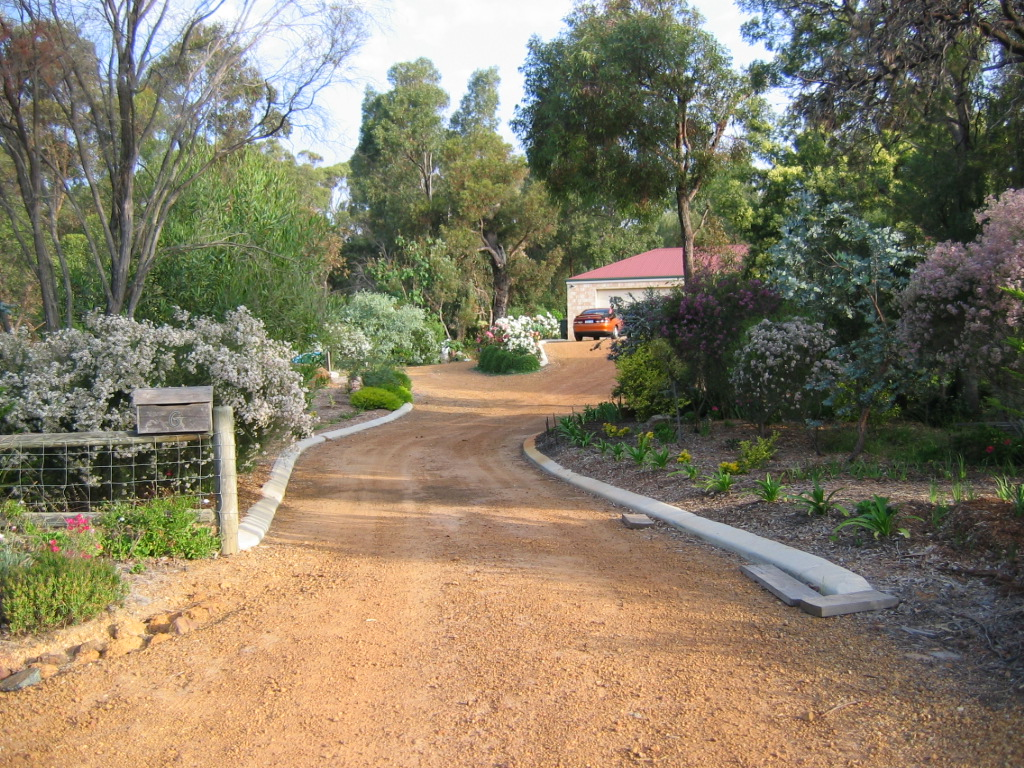
- Typical rural residential lot, on Marine Drive

- Interactive map of Leschenault
- Coordinates: 33.245°S 115.735°E
- Country: Australia
- State: Western Australia
- City: Bunbury
- LGA: Shire of Harvey
- Location: 16 km (9.9 mi) from Bunbury
- Established: 1990s

Government
  - State electorate: Leschenault
  - Federal division: Forrest

Area
  - Total: 43.5 km^{2} (16.8 sq mi)

Population
  - Total: 3,058 (SAL 2021)
- Postcode: 6233
Suburbs around Leschenault
Binningup		Kemerton
	Leschenault
	Australind	Kingston

Leschenault is an outer suburb of Australind, Western Australia, 6 km to the north-east. Its local government area is the Shire of Harvey. Leschenault is generally considered to be a higher socioeconomic area, with higher than average real estate prices.

== History ==
The name Leschenault honours botanist Jean Baptiste Leschenault de la Tour, who was part of Nicolas Baudin's 1802–1803 voyage which visited the coast and explored the estuary and nearby rivers. However, the first reported sighting of the coast was by Captain A.P. Jonk in the VOC Emeloort, who sighted land at 33°12' (most likely opposite the estuary from Australind) on 24 February 1658 while looking for the Vergulde Draeck but did not land.

Until the 1980s, the area was used only for low-level agriculture such as grazing, and some holiday homes were built along Cathedral Drive (formerly Scenic Drive) – as recently as 1988, the area was undeveloped. In the mid-1980s the State Government and the Shire of Harvey made plans for a new industrial park at nearby Kemerton, and interest in land at Leschenault for residential purposes increased during the 1990s as facilities became established in nearby Australind and the Australind Bypass was constructed. Most of the land was released in small rural residential estates such as Ashmere Heights, Parklands Estate, Wildflower Woods and Westgarth with large lots separated by natural and other parklands.

On 7 August 2006 a small tornado hit a 200 m x 100 m area in the Marine Drive area of Leschenault, damaging 60 houses, 20 of which residents were not permitted to return to and seven of which lost their roofs. The small community pulled together to assist the affected families and nearby Leschenault Leisure Centre (in Australind) served as an emergency camp. The State Government announced aid would be forthcoming.

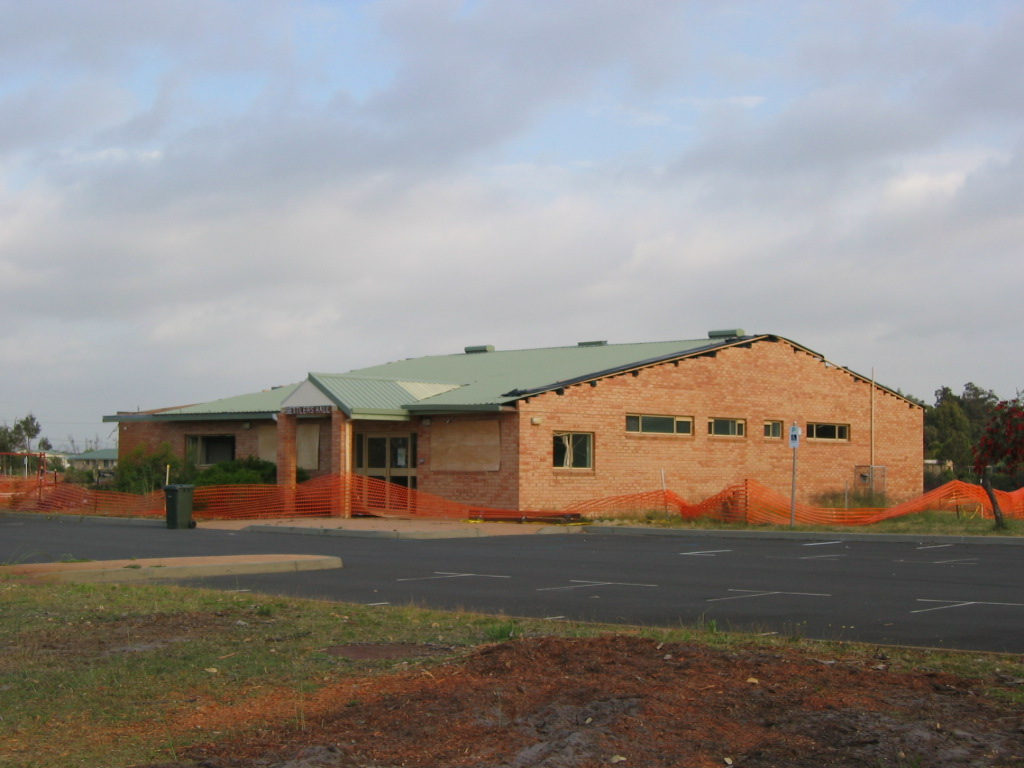
The community hall (Oct 2006)

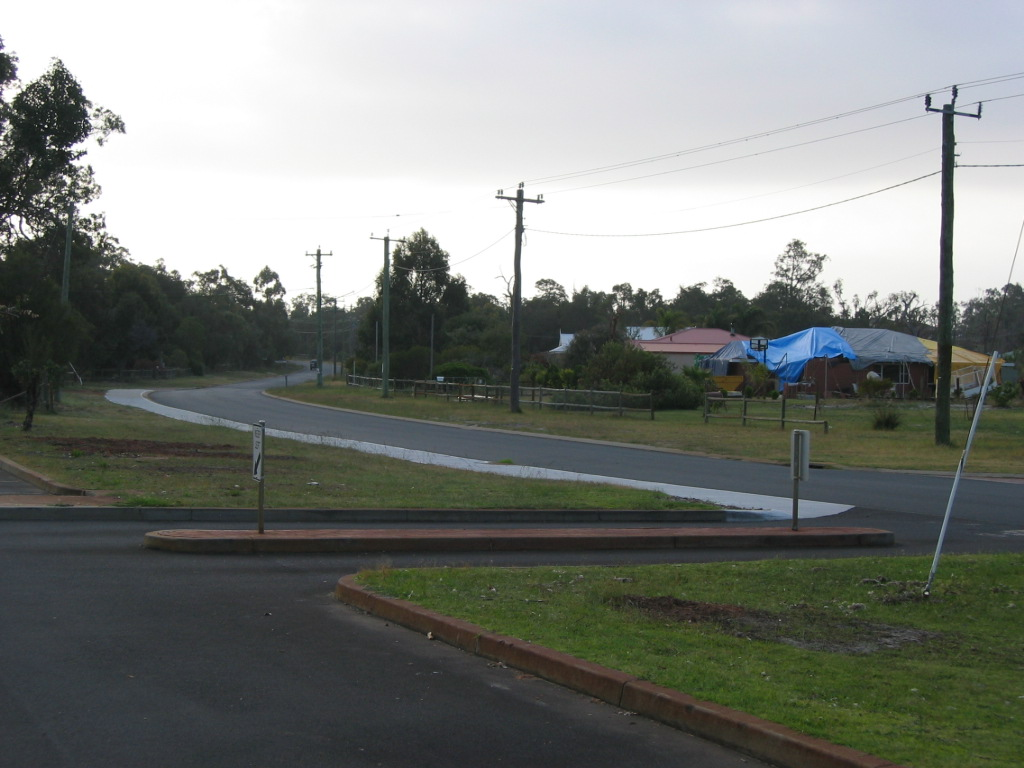
Houses on Marine Drive (Oct 2006)

== Geography ==
Leschenault is bordered to the south by the Brunswick River and Old Coast Road, to the west by the Leschenault Estuary and to the east by the Australind Bypass (part of National Route 1) and a line running north from the rubbish tip.

Leschenault contained 3058 residents as at the latest ABS census.

== Facilities ==
Leschenault's educational and shopping needs are serviced by neighbouring Australind. Numerous caravan parks and B&Bs dot the area, and a community centre, Settlers' Hall on Marine Drive, provides a central meeting place. Some northern parts of the suburb provide access to the Leschenault Peninsula Conservation Park, while the region's rubbish tip is located just off Australind Bypass.

== Transport ==
Leschenault has limited access to public transport. Transperth services are available in Galway Green south of Leschenault and school bus service the suburb.
