= South Western Advertiser =

Newspaper in Pinjarra, Western Australia, active 1910 - 1954

- Founded: 23 November 1910
- Ceased publication: 30 December 1954
- City: Pinjarra, Western Australia
- Country: Australia
- ISSN: 2202-9028

The South Western Advertiser (also known as the South-Western Advertiser) was a newspaper published weekly in Pinjarra, Western Australia from 1910 to 1954.

== Areas served ==
At the time of its first publication, the South Western Advertiser was circulated in the south-western area between Armadale and Brunswick, and was the only newspaper published between Perth and Bunbury.

== Ownership ==
Richard Sampson launched the South Western Advertiser, and many other local publications in the early 20th century. There was some concern about one individual owning a significant portion of the country's rural media, but The Swan Express remarked "Mr Sampson is at least entitled to the credit that he has given to several neglected districts a channel for the expression of their grievances."

== South Western Advertiser Trophy ==
The newspaper sponsored a shooting competition in 1935 and 1936, offering a trophy to the winner. The 1935 competition was held on 17 March 1935 with a C Dawe winning. P L Pavy won the next competition, held on 31 May 1936.
