= Myalup, Western Australia =

Myalup
- Town
- The Old Coast Road Brewery in Myalup in November 2026

- Interactive map of Myalup
- Coordinates: 33.10°S 115.7°E
- Country: Australia
- State: Western Australia
- LGA: Shire of Harvey
- Location: 149 km (93 mi) from Perth; 39 km (24 mi) from Bunbury; 24 km (15 mi) from Harvey
- Established: 1972

Government
  - State electorate: Murray-Wellington
  - Federal division: Forrest

Area
  - Total: 184.6 km^{2} (71.3 sq mi)

Population
  - Total: 344 (SAL 2021)
- Postcode: 6220

Myalup is a town located on the coast in the South West region of Western Australia between Mandurah and Bunbury. At the 2006 census, Myalup had a population of 144.

== History ==
The name Myalup is a local Aboriginal name for a nearby swamp (the word "mya" meaning the bark of a paperbark, which abound in the area). Prior to European settlement, the Noongar Ganeang people wandered around the eastern shores of Lake Josephine, east of the town.

The name was first recorded by Lieutenant Bunbury in 1836 as Miellup, then by a surveyor in 1849 as Myerlup. The land east of the Old Coast Road was farmed principally by the Crampton and later the Manning families. The pastures in the area were poor, so farmers were given a minimum of 4,000 acres (16 km^{2}) for grazing. In around 1890, the soil in the district was found to be phosphate deficient, so superphosphate was introduced to the pastures. Other additives were introduced in the mid-1900s as soil technology improved.

In 1972, following demand for beachside blocks in the area, the townsite was gazetted.

== Present day ==
Myalup is on the southern edge of the Yalgorup National Park, a haven to native wildlife and bird sanctuary as well as a home to stromatolites – sedimentary rocks composed of layers of fossilised blue-green algae and one of the first lifeforms known to exist on earth. Lake Preston, the largest of the nine lakes in the park, also borders the town. The town also has a caravan park, chalets, recreation ground and store, and a white-sand beach continuous to and shared with Binningup 5 kilometres (3 mi) to the south.
