= Beela, Western Australia =

Locality in Western Australia

Beela
- Interactive map of Beela
- Coordinates: 33.23449°S 115.91299°E
- Country: Australia
- State: Western Australia
- LGA: Shire of Harvey
- Location: 142.28 km (88.41 mi) from Perth

Government
  - State electorate: Murray-Wellington
  - Federal division: Forrest

Area
  - Total: 23.4 km^{2} (9.0 sq mi)
- Elevation: 88.17 m (289.3 ft)

Population
  - Total: 56 (SAL 2021)
- Time zone: UTC+8
- Postcode: 6224

Beela is a locality immediately east of Brunswick Junction in the South West region of Western Australia. The name Beela means "there in that place is where the river water is running into a pool" in the local Noongar language.

Aside from agricultural land, Beela also contains a Water Corporation dam originally built in 1938. It supplied Brunswick with drinking water until 2004, when it was decommissioned due to concerns over quality and supply security.

Beela is a stop on the Brunswick Junction to Collie railway line.
