= Kemerton Power Station =

Power station in Western Australia

Kemerton power station
- Country: Australia
- Coordinates: 33°09′48″S 115°46′50″E
- Status: Operational
- Commission date: 2005
- Owner: RATCH-Australia

Thermal power station
- Primary fuel: Natural gas
- Turbine technology: Gas turbine

Power generation
- Units operational: 4 × 1.25 MW; 2 × 155 MW
- Make and model: diesel generator (4) gas turbine (2)
- Nameplate capacity: 310 MW

Kemerton Power Station is a power station 17 km northeast of Bunbury in Western Australia. It is located in an area known as the Kemerton Industrial Park. The location had been considered as being Kemerton, in the 1980s as a potential aluminium smelter location, but is now considered to be part of Wellesley. The consideration of the site as being appropriate as a power station site was being considered in the early 2000s.

It is rated at 300 MW using two Siemens open cycle gas turbine generators powered by natural gas. It operates as a peaking plant and provides electricity into the South West Interconnected System (SWIS). When it was built in 2005, it was rated at 260.9 MW, and received an upgrade to the current capacity in June 2008. When gas is not available, the power station can also operate on fuel oil. Gas is supplied to the Kemerton Power Station via a 4.94 km lateral branch from the Dampier to Bunbury Natural Gas Pipeline. The branch line is a 300 mm diameter steel pipe with 6.4 mm wall thickness.

Kemerton power station also has four 1.25 MW diesel generators completed in October 2018. These are used in a contract with the Australian Energy Market Operator to provide the capability for a black start on the SWIS if needed.
