= Preston River =

River in Western Australia

Coordinates: 33°5′36″S 115°42′51″E

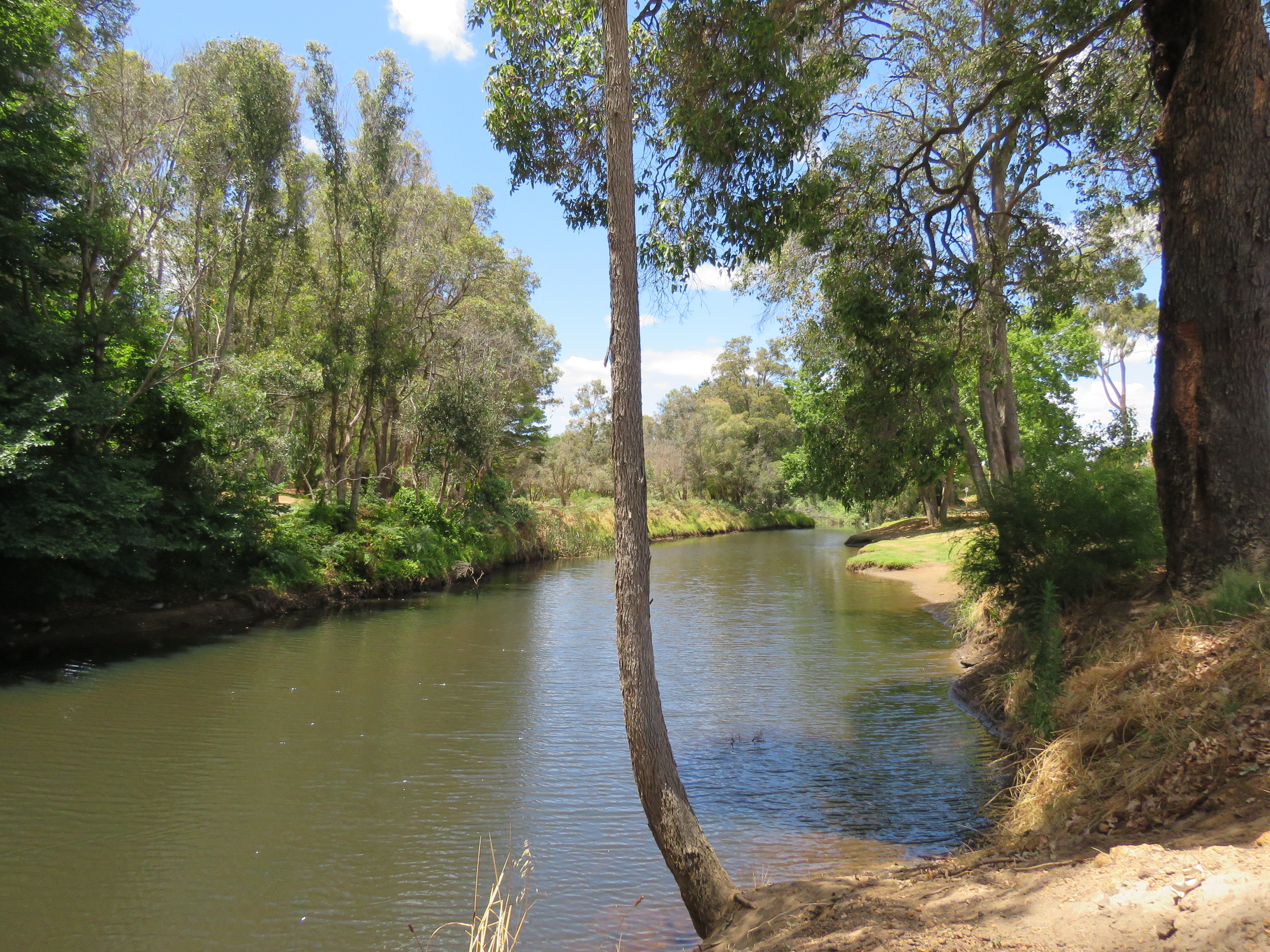
- The Preston River in Donnybrook

Location
- Country: Australia

Physical characteristics
- Source
  - location: Goonac siding
  - elevation: 219 metres (719 ft)
- Mouth
  - location: Leschenault Estuary
- Length: 84 kilometres (52 mi)
- Basin size: 113,957 hectares (281,594 acres)
- Discharge
  - average: 1,098 ML/a (0.0348 m^{3}/s; 1.229 cu ft/s)

The Preston River is a river in the South West region of Western Australia.

The river has a total length of 84 kilometres (52 mi) and rises near Goonac siding then flows in a north-westerly direction until discharging into the Leschenault Estuary. The headwaters are 80 kilometres (50 mi) inland within the Darling Range and run across the Blackwood Plateau and the Swan Coastal Plain.

The majority of the river catchment has been cleared for agriculture although some remnant forest vegetation exists at the headwaters.

The towns of Donnybrook and Boyanup are on the shores of the Preston River.

The major tributaries of the river include the Ferguson River and Joshua Creek. Minor tributaries include Thomson Brook, Crooked Brook, Charley Creek, Waterfall Gully, Mininup Brook, Millbrook and Gavin Guly. The Glen Mervyn Dam is along the Preston River.

The river basin is monitored routinely as a result of eutrophication problems within the Leschenault Inlet. The water quality is fresh in many places and generally low in nutrients although some areas are slightly enriched with nitrogen.

The river is named after William Preston, an officer in the Royal Navy, who settled in the Swan River Colony after arriving on HMS Sulphur in 1829.
