= Australind =

- Suburb
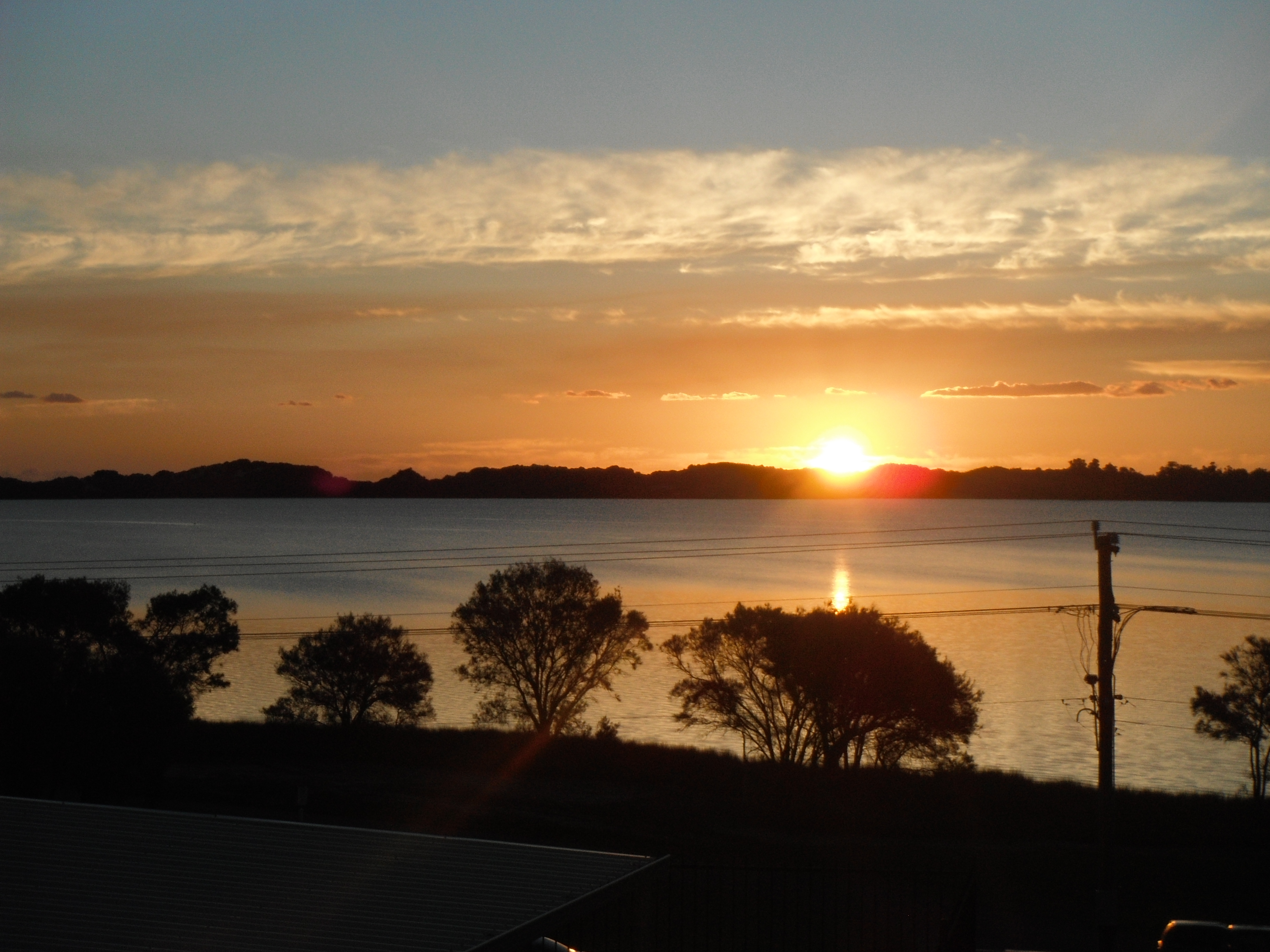

- Interactive map of Australind
- Coordinates: 33.280°S 115.726°E
- Country: Australia
- State: Western Australia
- LGA: Shire of Harvey
- Location: 12 km (7.5 mi) from Bunbury
- Established: 1841

Government
  - State electorate: Murray-Wellington
  - Federal division: Forrest

Area
  - Total: 23.2 km^{2} (9.0 sq mi)

Population
  - Total: 15,988 (SAL 2021)
- Postcode: 6233
Suburbs around Australind
| | Leschenault | Kemerton |
| | Australind | Kingston |
| Pelican Point | Eaton | Millbridge |

Australind is a town in Western Australia, located 12 kilometres (7.5 mi) north-east of Bunbury's central business district. Its local government area is the Shire of Harvey. At the 2021 census, Australind had a population of 15,988.

== History ==
Prior to European settlement, the area was home to the Elaap and Pindjarup people of the Noongar nation. Early explorers and settlers found them to be excellent trackers, and many of them found employment on farms. The first sighting of the coast was by Captain A. P. Jonk in the VOC ship Emeloort, who sighted land at 33°12' S (most likely opposite the estuary from Australind) on 24 February 1658 while looking for Vergulde Draeck, but did not land. A few months later, Elburg, under Capt. J. P. Peereboom, anchored off what is now Bunbury. Peerboom met three Aboriginal people, and returned to Batavia on 16 July 1658. In 1802–03, Nicolas Baudin visited the coast and explored the estuary and nearby rivers. He named Point Casuarina in Bunbury after one of his ships Casuarina, and the Leschenault Inlet after on-board botanist Jean Baptiste Leschenault de la Tour.

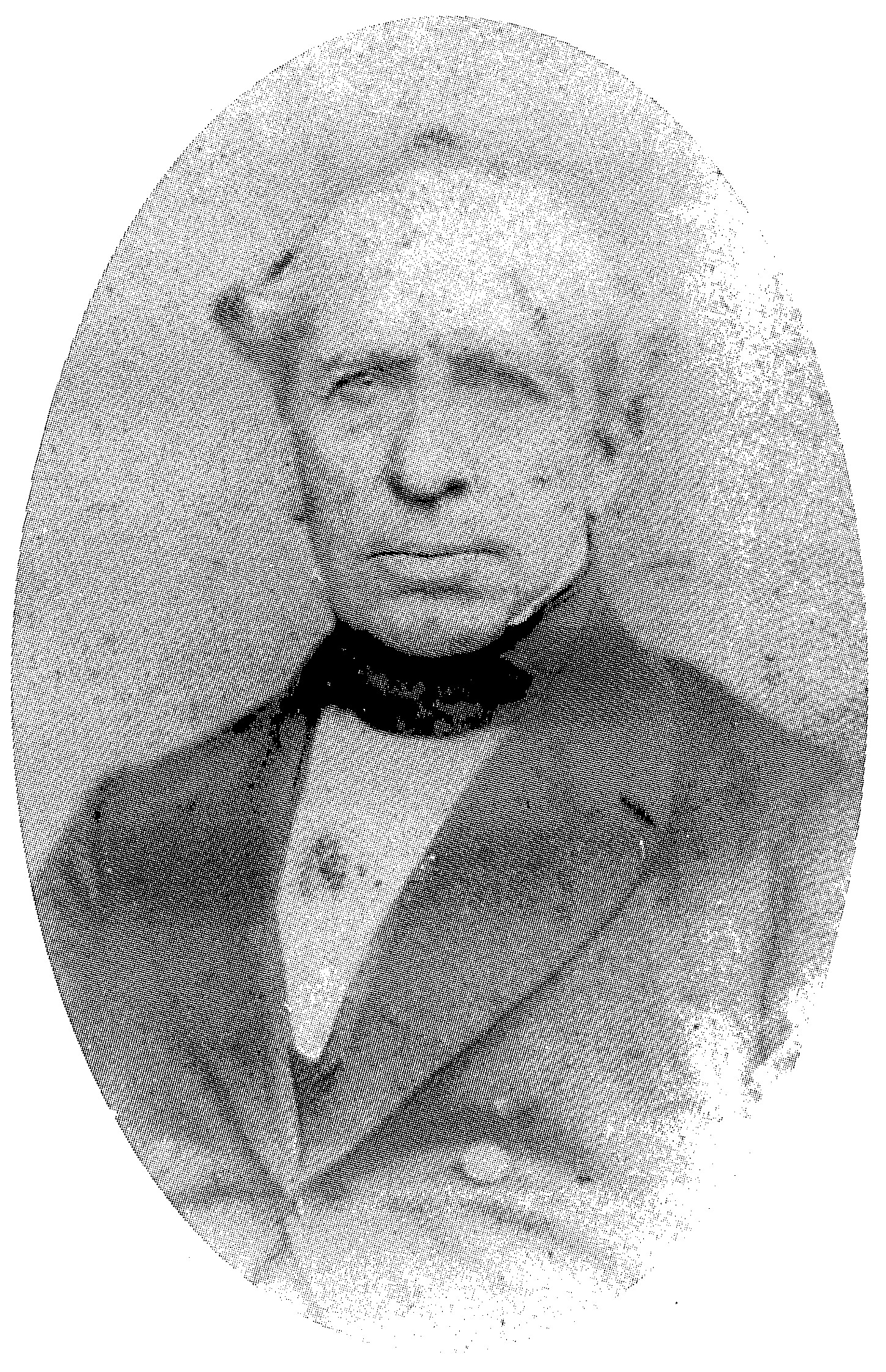
Marshall Waller Clifton, founder of Australind

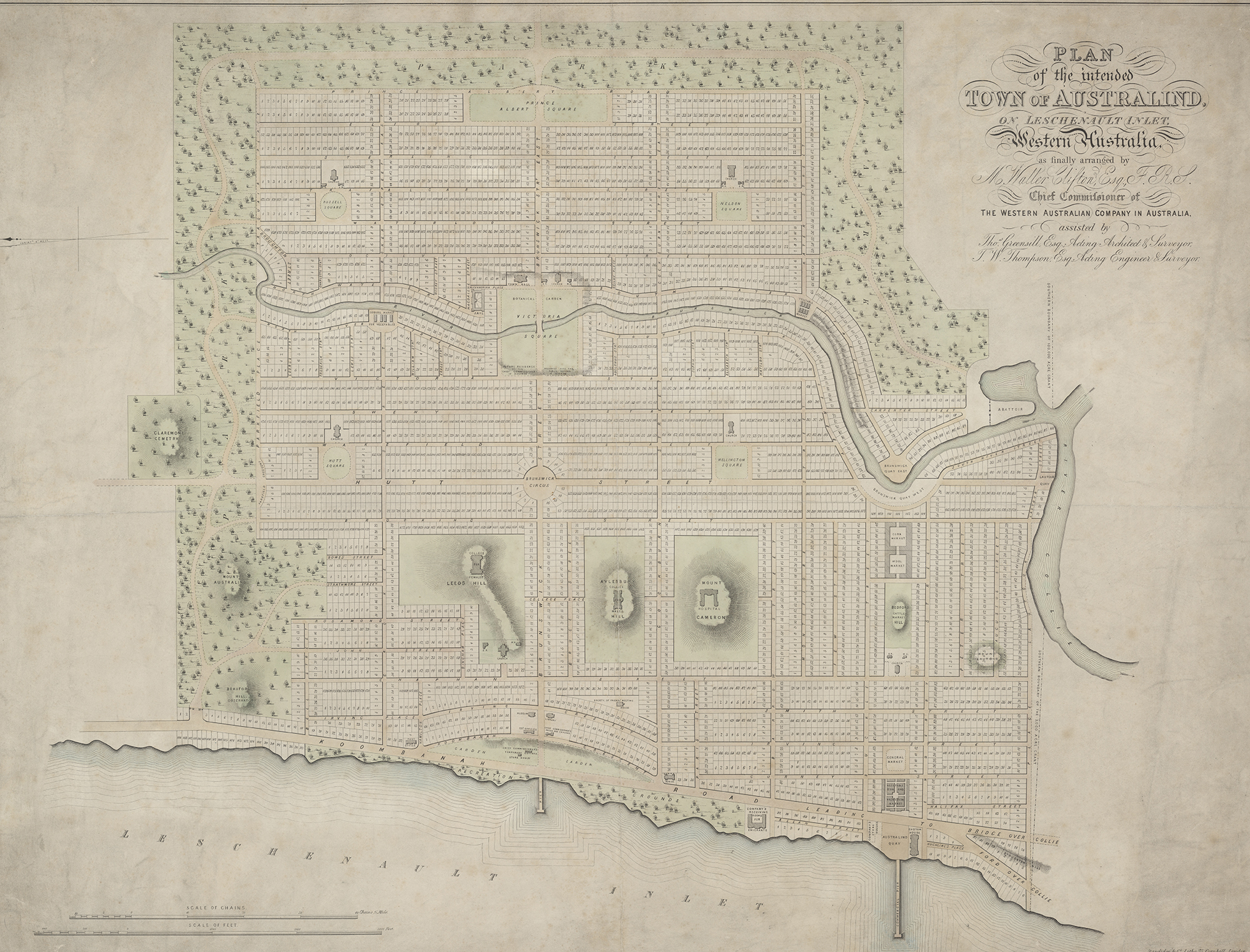
Plan of Australind Western Australia c. 1840

The name Australind is a combination of Australia and India, which was chosen due to the belief that the area could be used for breeding horses for the British Indian Army, as was later done at Cervantes, Northampton and Madura. In 1840, the Western Australian Land Company purchased 42,000 hectares (103,000 acres) of land with a plan to create an English-style village populated by settlers. The area had been mapped in 1831 by John Septimus Roe and explored by land by Lieutenant Henry Bunbury in 1836. A detailed plan of the town included a town square, church, a school, stores, a mill and a public hall. Marshall Waller Clifton, who arrived on Parkfield in 1841, was appointed leader of the 440 settlers. However, in January 1841, the Swan River Colony's Methodist minister Rev. John Smithies wrote in the following terms to the Wesleyan Missionary Society in London:

If any of your friends are thinking of Austral-Ind as a point of emigration tell them to Stop. It is one of the greatest puffs that there has been for some time. I should be sorry if any of our Methodist friends or others should be so deluded as to embark for such a place.

Before long, the settlement began to fail owing to poor soils and climate – no water in summer and too much of it in winter – and the settlers drifted away. Little of the planned town was ever developed. The company folded, the land was mostly resumed by the Crown, and the settlement plans were officially abandoned in 1875.

A bridge was built over the Brunswick River to allow nearby settlers to make use of the township's services, so that in the 1860s, Australind was surviving with a school, post office and store. However, growth was negligible and, in the 1890s, construction of the Perth to Bunbury railway via Pinjarra shifted the focus of development to agricultural and timber towns further inland. The population of Australind fell to 33 (15 males and 18 females) in 1898. In the 1971 census, 418 people lived in the Australind area.

The Parkfield name lives on in a nearby rural locality and in a primary school in northern Australind. A handful of historic buildings, including St Nicholas Church (1848) and Henton Cottage (1841) on Paris Road, and Clifton's former residence Upton House (1847) on Old Coast Road, still exist in the town. The Historic St Nicholas Church building, originally a worker's cottage, is 3.6 metres (12 ft) in width and 8.2 metres (27 ft) in length, and is believed to be the smallest church in Australia, while Henton Cottage was the town's first hotel.

In the 20th century, the district's residential and recreational appeal gradually attracted more development as Bunbury expanded to become a city. The Bunbury Golf Course was built in 1948 at nearby Clifton Park. Industries including a titanium dioxide pigment factory and waste-water plant were established there, and suburban development as part of "Greater Bunbury" saw the town quadruple in size by 1981.

A primary school opened in 1980, relieving pressure on that of nearby Eaton, and was followed by a high school which opened in 1987. New residential estates opened, and lin the mid-1980s the Western Australian Government and the Shire of Harvey made plans to relocate most of the industries to a new industrial park at nearby Kemerton. By 2001, Australind was predominantly residential, the census reporting over 10,000 residents, more than half of whom were first- or second-generation British immigrants, with a notable Italian minority.

== Geography ==
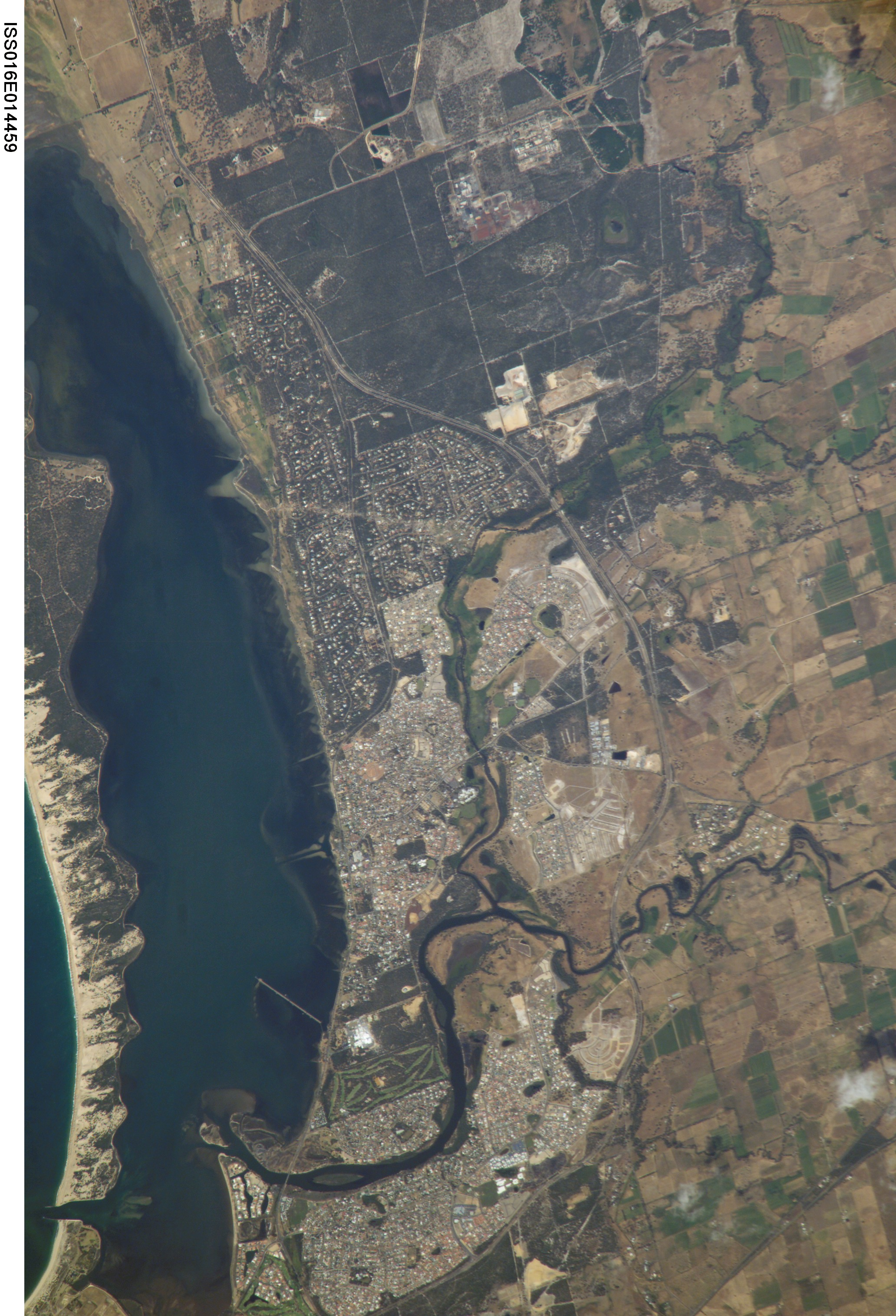
Satellite image of Australind and surrounds in October 2007

Australind is bordered to the south by the Collie River, to the west by the Leschenault Estuary (Derbal Elaap in Noongar) and to the east by the Brunswick River. It includes the estates of Galway Green and Clifton Park. The suburbs of Leschenault and Kemerton have seceded from Australind since the 1980s.

James Battye described the area thus:

Australind is beautifully situated on the eastern side of Leschenault Inlet, at a distance of about six miles [9.7 km] from Koombanah Bay, or, as it has been generally called, Port Leschenault, a good roadstead, within Point Casuarina, at the eastern extremity of Geographe Bay. The bay is open only from north or north and by east to west-north-west or west and by north; but as there is a strong undercurrent setting out, ships ride safely even in heavy gales from that quarter.

== Facilities ==
Australind has the Australind Village Shopping Centre, which contains Coles and Aldi supermarkets and various speciality stores. Treendale, a residential estate in Australind, is the location of the Treendale Shopping Centre. The 18-hole Bunbury Golf Club, which hosts the annual South West Open each June, is located within the Clifton Park estate in Australind.

== Attractions ==
Australind is known for its natural environment, heritage sites, waterways and recreational attractions surrounding the Leschenault Estuary. Popular attractions include Kalgulup Regional Park, a regional park encompassing wetlands, estuary foreshores, tuart forests, walking trails and conservation areas of cultural significance to Noongar people. The estuary itself is popular for crabbing, fishing, kayaking, sailing and windsurfing. Leschenault Waterways Discovery Centre & Jetty Walk, also known locally as the Australind Jetty Walk and Living Window, provides interpretive information about the estuary’s ecology and history.

Historic attractions include Henton Cottage, built in 1841 as the Prince of Wales Hotel and now operates as a visitor information and heritage centre, and nearby St Nicholas Church. The Eaton–Australind Historic Trail and the John Boyle O’Reilly Interpretive Walk and monument recognise the district’s colonial and convict history. Other family and cultural attractions include Karragarup Play Space, the Big Banksia sculpture, Kingston Estate Park Wetland Trail, the Danjoo Bilya Trail and Danjoo Bilya Paperbark Boardwalk, the Heart and Home sculpture, My Doll Cottage doll museum, and the Belvidere Day Use Site and Interpretive Walk.

Australind is also home to Featured Wood Gallery & Museum, showcasing fine woodcraft and timber art, and Adrift Brewing, a locally owned craft brewery. The surrounding estuary and foreshore areas are recognised for birdlife, wetlands and scenic views across the Leschenault Estuary and Collie River

Australind has many attractions, places to eat, and accommodation options for visitors exploring the Harvey Region.

=== Education ===
Australind has two high schools: Australind Senior High School and Our Lady of Mercy College, as well as six primary schools: Australind (1980), Treendale (2014), Clifton Park (1988), Parkfield (1993), Kingston (2009), and Leschenault Catholic Primary School.

== Transport ==
Australind is served by the 841 (Australind) route from Bunbury's central bus station, with a journey time of approximately 32 minutes. The route is operated by TransBunbury for the Public Transport Authority.

Despite the name, the Transwa Australind rail service does not stop in or transit the town.

== Gallery ==
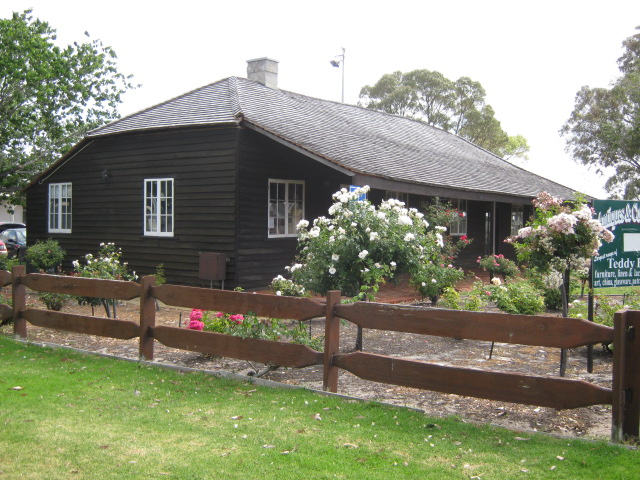
Henton Cottage, opposite the Australind Village Shopping Centre

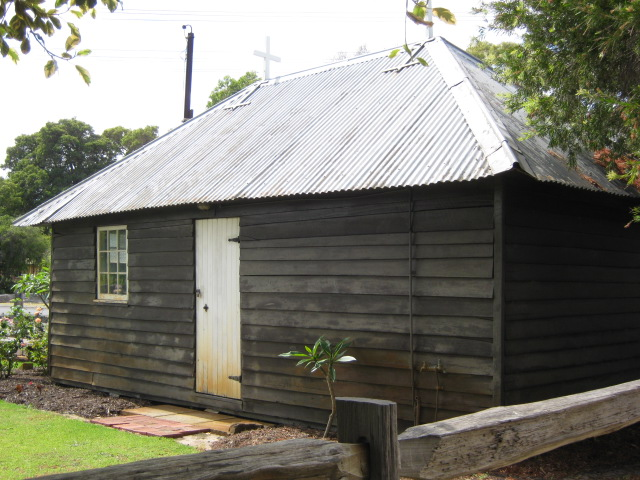
The site of the Historic St Nicholas Church building sits in front of the new and much larger modern building where the current church gather throughout the week
