= Marshall Waller Clifton =

Australian politician

Waller Clifton
- Born: Marshall Waller Clifton; 1 November 1787; Alverstoke, Hampshire, England
- Died: 10 April 1861 (aged 73); Australind, Western Australia, Australia
- Spouse: Elinor Bell (1811–61; his death)
- Children: 15

Marshall Waller Clifton (1 November 1787 – 10 April 1861), commonly referred to as Waller Clifton, was an English civil servant, coloniser and politician in Western Australia.

== History ==
Clifton was born 1 November 1787 at Alverstoke, near Gosport, Hampshire, England, to Rev. Francis Clifton and Rebekah Katherine Clifton (née Bingham).

He joined the Admiralty as an extra clerk on 9 September 1805, and was promoted to junior clerk on 15 March 1811, 2nd class clerk on 5 February 1816, and 1st class clerk on 21 August 1819.

On 2 July 1811, Clifton married Elinor Bell (of Wandle House, Wandsworth, London, a first cousin, close friend and co-religionist of Elizabeth Fry, the famous Quaker prison reformer). Clifton and Elinor had fifteen children, one of whom died as a baby. Eleven of these children later came to Western Australia with their parents in 1841, and one followed later (George, as a Lieutenant in the Royal Navy in 1843, and again 1851–64).

On 22 January 1822, Clifton was appointed secretary to the Victualling Board for the Royal Navy at Somerset House. In 1828 he was elected as a Fellow of the Royal Society. After the position of secretary to the Victualling Board was abolished in 1832, he was retired on a pension and moved his family to France for eight years.

In 1840 the Western Australian Land Company was formed in London to promote a large land settlement scheme in the Colony of Western Australia. This was planned by a group of influential men including William Hutt, M.P. (brother of John Hutt, Governor of Western Australia from 1838 to 1846) and Edward Gibbon Wakefield, upon whose principles of colonisation the company was founded. Clifton was appointed Chief Commissioner and his son, Robert Williams Clifton (1817–1897), was appointed his secretary.

The name of the settlement, Australind, a contraction of Australia and India, was chosen as it was hoped to establish trade between the two countries.

Clifton and his family and other first settlers of the Australind region sailed to Australia on the barque Parkfield in October 1840, arriving at Port Leschenault (Bunbury) on 18 March 1841. (Note: Clifton's family, from the passenger list, consisted of Marshall Waller Clifton (chief commissioner of the Western Australian Company) (53) and Mrs. Clifton (48); the Misses Louise (26), Ellen (20), Mary (18), Lucy (11), Rachael (7), and Caroline Clifton (5); Masters Gervase (15), Chas H. (13) and L. Worsley Clifton (10). Mr. Robert W. Clifton (secretary to the chief commissioner) (24), and his wife (19). Also on the list was Wm. Pearce Clifton (25). They had been promised land at Geraldton, but on arrival they were informed that they were going to Australind — take it or register a protest, and wait a year for the reply.) In 1841 Clifton was appointed magistrate and Justice of the Peace. However approval for the settlement was not finalised until 6 April 1842, and which Clifton was allocated a parcel of land at 15 Clifton Road, which he named "Alverstoke" and on which the original house still stands today.

The Western Australian Land Company collapsed in 1843, ceasing all operations in Western Australia within 3 years and the settlers were left to fend for themselves.

Clifton's children became prominent members of society in Bunbury, Australind and Brunswick, several occupying important positions such as Resident Magistrate (Pearce), Inspector of Water Police (George, who later returned to England and became Governor of Dartmoor Prison), member of the Town Trust (Pearce), Collector of Customs at Fremantle (Worsley). At one time, the Under Secretary for Lands, the Under Treasurer and the Surveyor General were all grandsons of Clifton. In 1897 about twenty of his grandchildren held senior offices in the Western Australian public service.

Elinor Clifton imported from England a prefabricated building (perhaps a Manning's portable cottage of which the Friends' Meeting House, Adelaide was a large example) as a meeting house, hoping to attract other settlers as "Friends". In 1847 Clifton moved to Upton House, which had been built from bricks brought from England as ballast on the Trusty when it arrived in May 1844. They had been intended for a house for Elizabeth Fry, but after her death in 1845 her husband sold them Clifton.

In 1844 he was appointed to the Leschenault Road Board, and in 1851 he became a member of the Western Australian Legislative Council. He became known for fighting for the rights of the small landholders, which caused friction with the larger landholders and merchants of the Colony. He remained in the Legislative Council until the age of 71, resigning in 1858.

Clifton died at Upton House on 10 April 1861 after a long illness. His obituary in The Perth Gazette and Independent Journal of Politics and News of 19 April 1861 reads:

"It is with much regret that we record in our obituary of this day the death of Marshall Waller Clifton, Esq., of Australind. From his first arrival in the Colony, 20 years ago, to the period of his death, Mr. Clifton occupied a prominent position amongst us. When in the Legislative Council he was one of its most active and intelligent members. As a Horticulturist he was pre-eminent, the practical results of his various experiments in that branch of science leaving him no compeer. As the country gentleman, he was the personification of hospitality; whilst his agreeable manners, well-stored mind, and hilarity of spirits enhanced in no small degree the pleasures of his way-faring guests. In his family relations Mr. Clifton was in all respects patriarchal, and although he lived and died 'amidst a grove of his own kindred', there were many absent ones to grieve over his loss. In society at large he leaves a blank, as all must feel who have appreciated his presence during those periodical visits he was wont to pay to Perth and Fremantle; when, as 'The observed of all observers' his elasticity of spirits and 'Bonhommie' served to create, at least, a pleasing ripple upon the too often monotonous surface of our every day life."

== In popular culture ==
Perth Gossip, a play by Canon Alfred Burton, was produced for the West Australian Historical Society in November 1933 at the Karrakatta Club, and again at the Burt Memorial Hall on 8 May 1934. The play was set in the drawing-room of Upton House, and centred around a visit from Archdeacon Wollaston (played by Burton), with the Clifton family (Marshall Waller Clifton, his Quaker wife, and children Mrs Johnston, Mrs George Eliot and Pearce Clifton) pumping him for gossip about other settlers. Several latter-day members of the family were in the cast.
