= Collie River =

River in South West region of Western Australia

Coordinates: 33°18′S 115°44′E

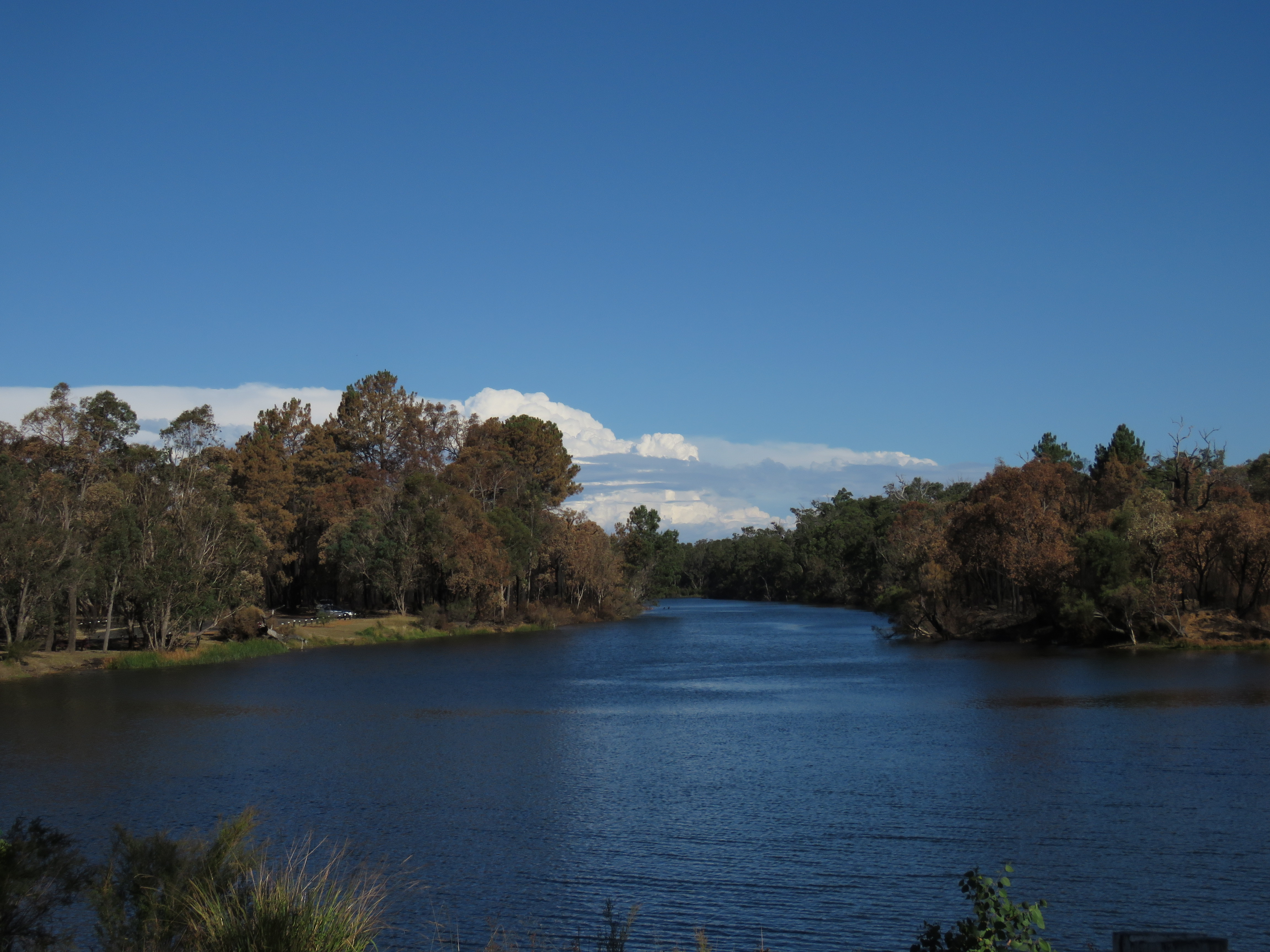

Location
- Country: Australia

Physical characteristics
- Source
  - location: Darling Range
  - elevation: 207 metres (679 ft)
- Mouth
  - location: Leschenault Estuary
  - elevation: sea level
- Length: 154 kilometres (96 mi)
- Basin size: 374,500 hectares (925,410 acres)

Basin features
- Waterbodies: Wellington Reservoir

The Collie River is a river in the South West region of Western Australia.

The Collie River was named by Lieutenant Governor Stirling after Alexander Collie who, along with Lieutenant William Preston, in November 1829 was the first European to explore the river.

The Collie River Catchment is located in the south-west of Western Australia, it covers over 3,000 km^{2} (1,200 sq mi) and includes the Wellington Reservoir. For Western Australia's growing population the reservoir is considered a valuable resource, but the water is too salty for drinking. The Waters and Rivers Commission has a target of reducing the salinity of the river water to 500 mg/L by 2015 as a part of the State Salinity Strategy.

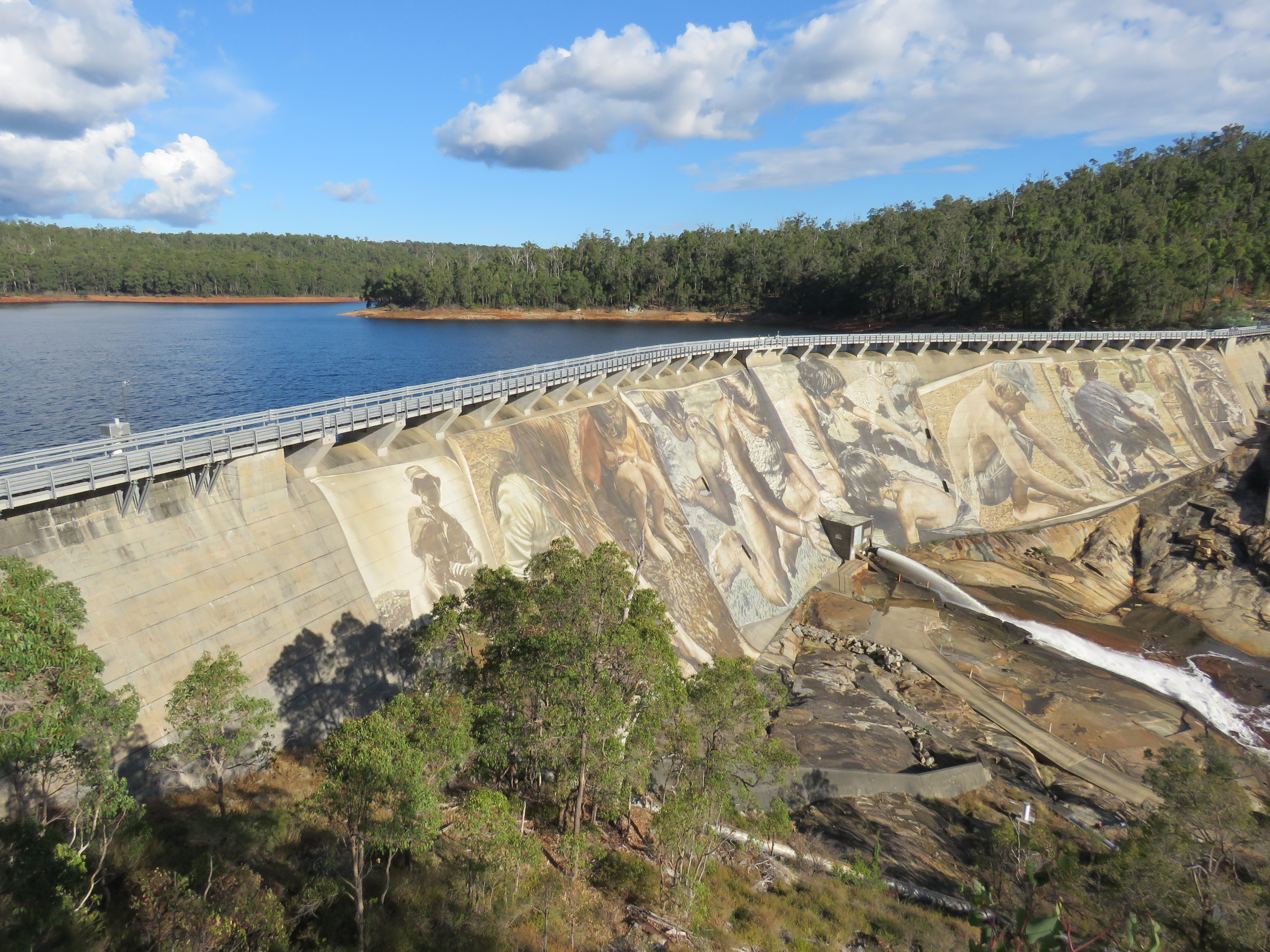
Wellington Dam, fed by the Collie River

== Tributaries ==
There are many tributaries of the Collie River including Collie River East, Collie River South, Bingham River, Brunswick River, Gervase River, Hamilton River, Harris River, Ironstone Gully, Silver Wattle Gully, Worsley River, Riches Gully and Mill Brook.
