= Shire of Harvey =

Coordinates: 33°04′41″S 115°53′38″E

- Local government area
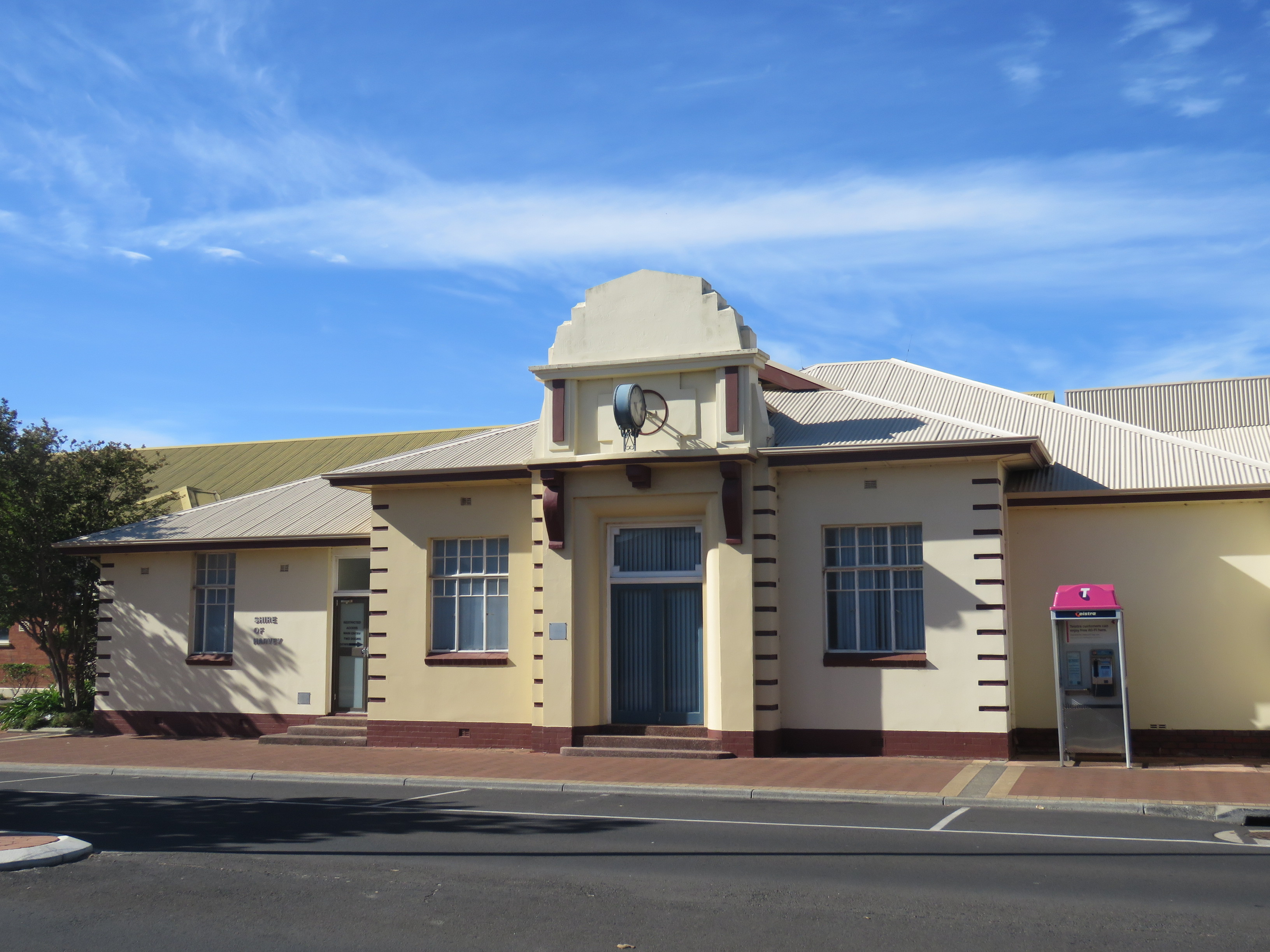
- The Harvey Shire Council Chambers & Town Hall

- Interactive map of Shire of Harvey
- Country: Australia
- State: Western Australia
- Region: South West, Outer Bunbury
- Established: 1894
- Council seat: Harvey

Government
  - Shire President: Michelle Campbell
  - State electorate: Murray-Wellington
  - Federal division: Forrest

Area
  - Total: 1,728.3 km^{2} (667.3 sq mi)

Population
  - Total: 28,567 (LGA 2021)
- Website: Shire of Harvey
LGAs around Shire of Harvey
Indian Ocean	Waroona	Boddington
Indian Ocean	Shire of Harvey	Collie
Bunbury	Dardanup	Collie

The Shire of Harvey is a local government area of Western Australia. Harvey is located in the state's South West region, approximately 140 km south of Perth, and includes some of Bunbury's northern suburbs. The shire covers an area of 1,728 km² and had a population of approximately 26,500 as at the 2016 Census. Around 12% of the population are of Southern or Eastern European origin.

It contains three large towns, Harvey, Australind and Brunswick Junction and a number of smaller towns. The shire office is located on Uduc Road, Harvey, and an administration centre is open at Mulgara Street, Australind.

== History ==
It was established as the Brunswick Road District on 14 December 1894, when it separated from the larger Wellington Road District. The first election was held on 11 February 1895.

It was renamed the Harvey Road District on 10 December 1909. It was made a shire with effect from 1 July 1961 following the passage of the Local Government Act 1960, which reformed all remaining road districts into shires.

In 2026 the shire sought city status.

== Wards ==
The shire does not have Wards, although is represented by Councillors from all around the Shire.

== Towns and localities ==
The towns and localities of the Shire of Harvey with population and size figures based on the most recent Australian census:

Locality	Population	Area	Map
Australind	15,988 (SAL 2021)	23.2 km^{2} (9.0 sq mi)	
Beela	56 (SAL 2021)	23.4 km^{2} (9.0 sq mi)	
Benger	159 (SAL 2021)	70.8 km^{2} (27.3 sq mi)	
Binningup	1,296 (SAL 2021)	29.3 km^{2} (11.3 sq mi)	
Brunswick Junction	1,195 (SAL 2021)	97.1 km^{2} (37.5 sq mi)	
Cookernup	604 (SAL 2021)	82.5 km^{2} (31.9 sq mi)	
Harvey	3,462 (SAL 2021)	66 km^{2} (25 sq mi)	
Hoffman	31 (SAL 2021)	445.1 km^{2} (171.9 sq mi)	
Leschenault	3,058 (SAL 2021)	43.5 km^{2} (16.8 sq mi)	
Mornington	42 (SAL 2021)	238.5 km^{2} (92.1 sq mi)	
Myalup	344 (SAL 2021)	184.6 km^{2} (71.3 sq mi)	
Parkfield	54 (SAL 2021)	25.5 km^{2} (9.8 sq mi)	
Roelands	938 (SAL 2021)	95 km^{2} (37 sq mi)	
Uduc	374 (SAL 2021)	72.7 km^{2} (28.1 sq mi)	
Warawarrup	137 (SAL 2021)	13.4 km^{2} (5.2 sq mi)	
Wellesley	35 (SAL 2021)	50 km^{2} (19 sq mi)	
Wokalup	255 (SAL 2021)	80.8 km^{2} (31.2 sq mi)	
Yarloop	541 (SAL 2021)	92.3 km^{2} (35.6 sq mi)	

== Population ==
Historical population

Year	Pop.	±% p.a.
1911	3,646	—
1921	3,950	+0.80%
1933	5,367	+2.59%
1947	5,589	+0.29%
1954	6,731	+2.69%
1961	6,834	+0.22%
1966	6,543	−0.87%
1971	6,460	−0.26%
1976	6,704	+0.74%

Year	Pop.	±% p.a.
1981	8,027	+3.67%
1986	9,609	+3.66%
1991	12,367	+5.18%
1996	14,714	+3.54%
2001	17,224	+3.20%
2006	19,556	+2.57%
2011	23,237	+3.51%
2016	27,029	+3.07%
2021	28,567	+1.11%

The ABS provides a breakdown for the Australind suburban area (Part A) and the remainder of the Shire (Part B):

Year	Part A	Part B
1991	5,816	6,551
1996	7,570	7,144
2001	9,574	7,650
2006	11,537	8,019
2011	14,779	8,455

== Heritage-listed places ==
As of 2023, 282 places are heritage-listed in the Shire of Harvey, of which nine are on the State Register of Heritage Places, among them the Yarloop Workshops which were destroyed in a 2016 bushfire.

== See also ==
- Camp Doogs
