= Brunswick Junction, Western Australia =

Brunswick Junction
- Town
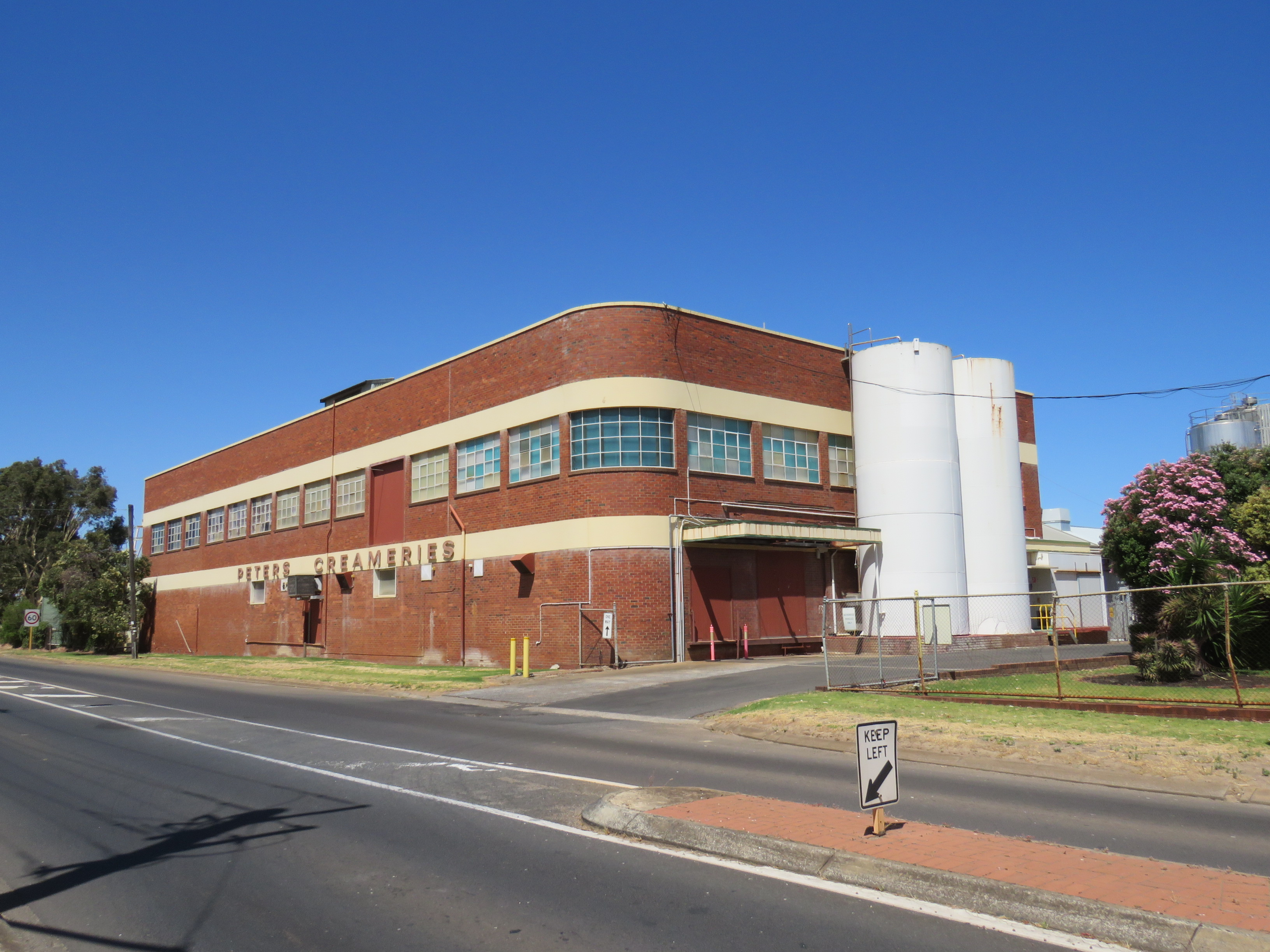
- Peters Creameries building

- Interactive map of Brunswick Junction
- Coordinates: 33.2574368°S 115.838505°E
- Country: Australia
- State: Western Australia
- LGA: Shire of Harvey
- Location: 161 km (100 mi) from Perth; 26 km (16 mi) from Bunbury; 21 km (13 mi) from Harvey
- Established: 1898

Government
  - State electorate: Murray-Wellington
  - Federal division: Forrest

Area
  - Total: 97.1 km^{2} (37.5 sq mi)

Population
  - Total: 807 (UCL 2021)
- Postcode: 6224

Brunswick Junction is a town in the South West region of Western Australia, situated along the South Western Highway between Harvey and Bunbury. It had a population of 772 people at the 2016 census, down from 797 at the 2006 census.

== History ==
The Aboriginal name for the Brunswick area is Mue-De-La.

The Brunswick River which runs just north of the town was surveyed by John Septimus Roe in 1830, and likely named by Governor Stirling after the Duke of Brunswick. Stirling was in command of HMS Brazen in 1813 when the ship was commissioned to take the Duke of Brunswick to Holland. The Duke was on the ship for five days.

The first farm in the area, "Alverstoke", started in 1842 by Marshall Waller Clifton, was producing wheat, barley and potatoes within a few years. A bridge was built over the Brunswick River at Australind to give settlers in the area easier access to what was then the main community in the Harvey District.

In 1893, when the Perth-Bunbury railway was completed, no-one lived in the present-day townsite, but the Brunswick Farmers' Association was formed, with a post office and school operating nearby. In 1898, a junction was opened south of the river when the line to Collie opened and Brunswick Junction railway station was built.

The population of the town was 68 (38 males and 30 females) in 1898.

The Brunswick Junction Prison was located in the former railway barracks. By 1979, it was a minimum security prison with capacity for 26 inmates. It was closed in 1984.

The town's centre underwent a significant upgrade in 2011 as part of the Royalties for Regions program, a dairy themed playground, landscaping and an underground power hub were all part of the $380,000 project that was opened by Brendon Grylls.

== Present day ==
Brunswick Junction is mainly known today for dairying, to which a large Friesian cow (nicknamed Daisy) stands testament in a park in the centre of town. Peters Creameries produces milk products and cheese from nearby dairy farmers.

The town also hosts several historic buildings, including the shire hall, Catholic and Anglican churches and railway cottages, and the nearby Beela Valley has a scenic drive which takes in farming country east of the town as well as the Mornington forests.

The Brunswick Agricultural Show is one of the largest in regional Australia with over 15,000 visitors in October of each year. A fashion parade, trade exhibits, arts and crafts and flowers are among the things on offer.

== Transport ==
Brunswick Junction is on the South Western Highway, 26 kilometres (16 mi) north-east of Bunbury. In town, the South Western Highway carries the name Ommaney Road. Brunswick Junction is linked by road to Australind to the west via Clifton Road.

=== Railway junction ===
The Australind passenger train from Perth to Bunbury stops at Brunswick Junction as the penultimate station on the South Western Railway.

It is a railway junction for the railway line from Collie, and the former railway branch lines that extended further east of Collie.
