= Brunswick River (Western Australia) =

River in Western Australia

Location
- Country: Australia

Physical characteristics
- Source
  - elevation: 223 metres (732 ft)
- Mouth
  - location: Collie River
  - coordinates: 33°17′27″S 115°43′37″E
  - elevation: sea level
- Length: 48 kilometres (30 mi)

Brunswick River is a river in the South West region of Western Australia.

The Brunswick River has a catchment area of approximately 528km² and joins the Collie River about 6km upstream of the Leschenault Inlet.

The river rises in the Darling Range then flows south-west discharging into the Collie River near Australind.

The river was named in 1830 by Lieutenant-Governor James Stirling after Ernest Augustus, King of Hanover, Duke of Brunswick and Lüneburg, the fifth son and eighth child of George III. Over a period of five days in December 1813, while in command of HMS Brazen, Captain Stirling took the duke and his entourage to Wijk aan Zee in Holland.

The Brunswick has six tributaries: Wellesley River, Ernest River, Elvira Gully, Augustus River, Frederic River and Lunenburgh River.
