= Binningup, Western Australia =

Binningup
- Town
- Interactive map of Binningup
- Coordinates: 33.149°S 115.689°E
- Country: Australia
- State: Western Australia
- LGA: Shire of Harvey
- Location: 154 km (96 mi) from Perth; 31 km (19 mi) from Bunbury

Government
  - State electorate: Murray-Wellington
  - Federal division: Forrest

Area
  - Total: 29.3 km^{2} (11.3 sq mi)

Population
  - Total: 1,271 (UCL 2021)
- Postcode: 6233

Binningup is a town on the coast of the South West region of Western Australia between Mandurah and Bunbury. At the 2016 census, Binningup had a population of 1,227.

== History ==
Binningup is on the traditional lands of the Pindjarup people.

Binningup takes its name from "Binningup Beach Estate", a name used by a syndicate of Harvey people who subdivided the area in 1953. It is apparently an Aboriginal name, but not necessarily traditional. The name was in use as early as 1849, and in the early 20th century, residents of the nearby Springhill area walked to the area to swim at the rocks. The area was used as a lookout point by the Voluntary Defence Corps during World War II, many of whom were associated with the Uduc Progress Association.

In 1950, Ted Holthouse and Gordon Goodson were delegated to approach the then Harvey Road Board (now Shire Council) for an opinion. Two years of debate and assessment passed between the two parties before the Association members obtained permission to begin. A syndicate then purchased farmland and subdivided the area in the early 1950s.

By 1962 there was only one resident in the area, but many homes were built in the following few years, and a road was cleared and constructed from Old Coast Road to the area by community members. At the request of the Shire of Harvey, Binningup was gazetted a townsite in 1963.

An H5-class meteorite fall was recorded at Binningup on 30 September 1984.

== Present day ==
A main beach is protected by a reef running parallel to it. The town contains a general store, caravan park and cafe, skateboard park, tennis courts, basketball courts, a bowling club and bowling greens, a community centre, youth camp, a public library and a public oval.

=== Tourism ===
Binningup is a popular stopover for tourists from Perth. Many homes in the coastal town are occupied by permanent residents and some are holiday homes.

The beach and clear, non-polluted water make the town a popular site for swimmers and surfers; summer months can draw hundreds of tourists from the north and south. Fishing is also popular; the reef contains a variety of sea life.

Binningup has many attractions, places to eat, and accommodation options for visitors exploring the Harvey Region.

=== Desalination plant ===
A desalination plant in Binningup provides Perth and surrounding areas including Mandurah, Kalgoorlie and Bunbury with drinking water. The Premier Colin Barnett opened the second stage of the plant in 2013; the expansion cost A$450 million, equivalent to A$541 million in 2022, and doubled the capacity to 100 gigalitres (3.5 billion cubic feet).
