= List of Bunbury suburbs =

The Greater Bunbury sub-region includes the local government areas of City of Bunbury, Shire of Harvey, Shire of Dardanup and Shire of Capel, and comprises the following localities (suburbs):

- Australind
- Beela
- Benger
- Binningup
- Boyanup
- Brunswick Junction
- Bunbury
- Burekup
- Capel
- Capel River
- Carey Park
- College Grove
- Cookernup
- Crooked Brook
- Dalyellup
- Dardanup
- Dardanup West
- Davenport
- East Bunbury
- Eaton
- Elgin
- Ferguson
- Forrest Beach
- Gelorup
- Glen Iris
- Gwindinup
- Harvey
- Henty
- Hoffman
- Kemerton
- Leschenault
- Ludlow (northern half)
- Millbridge
- Mornington
- Myalup
- North Boyanup
- Paradise
- Parkfield
- Pelican Point
- Peppermint Grove Beach
- Picton
- Picton East
- Riverlea
- Roelands
- South Bunbury
- Stirling Estate
- Stratham
- The Plains
- Uduc
- Usher
- Vittoria
- Warawarrup
- Waterloo
- Wellesley
- Wellington Forest
- Wellington Mill
- Withers
- Wokalup
- Yarloop
