= Wilman Wadandi Highway =

Western Australian ring road

Wilman Wadandi Highway Western Australia
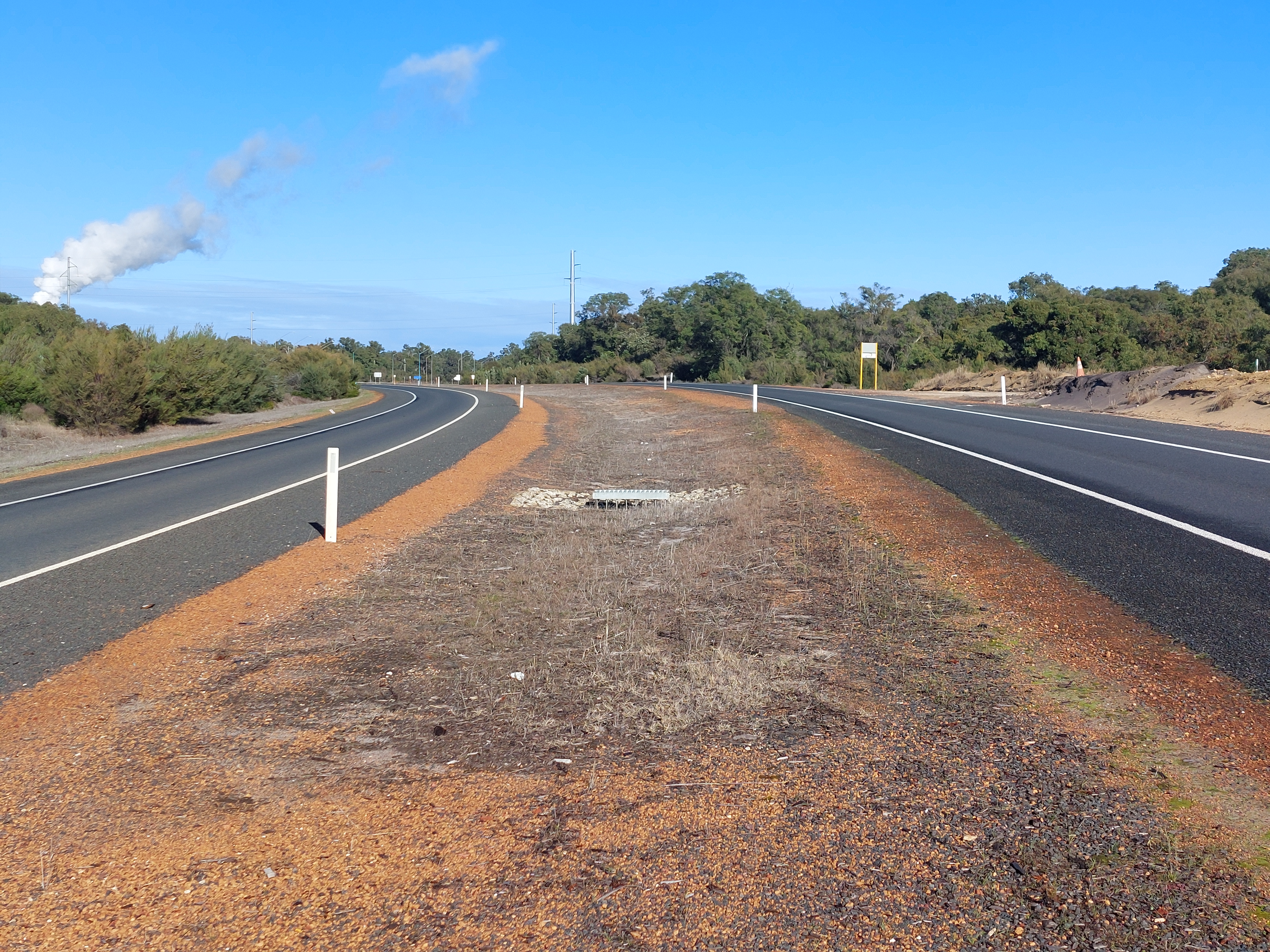
- Wilman Wadandi Highway near Picton-Boyanup Road in June 2023

General information
- Type: Road
- Length: 27 km (17 mi)
- Opened: 2013 (first section); 2024 (entire road)
- Route number(s): State Route 101

Major junctions
- North end: Forrest Highway (National Route 1) Australind / Brunswick
- South Western Highway (State Route 20); South Western Highway (National Route 1)
- South end: Bussell Highway (State Route 10) Dalyellup / Gelorup

Location(s)
- Major suburbs: Australind, Picton East, Davenport, Dalyellup

The Wilman Wadandi Highway is a ring road around the city of Bunbury, Western Australia that was completed in December 2024. The road is 27 kilometres (17 mi) long, and links Forrest Highway in the north-east to Bussell Highway in the south-west, passing via South Western Highway and was expected to cut travel time from Perth to Margaret River by 20 minutes.

Formerly known as the Bunbury Outer Ring Road (BORR), it was renamed in October 2024 after the Wilman and Wadandi Indigenous Australian peoples that originally lived in the area. The highway is signed State Route 101.

== Route description ==
The Wilman Wadandi Highway (WWH) is a 27-kilometre (17 mi) long four-lane dual carriageway running from Forrest Highway near Australind to the Bussell Highway near Dalyellup. Construction of the WWH was divided into three stages. The first stage involved the construction of the central section of the road, between the southern section of South Western Highway and Boyanup-Picton Road. The second stage was the northern section, between Forrest Highway and Boyanup-Picton Road. The third stage was the southern section, between South Western Highway and Bussell Highway.

The second stage of the WWH commenced at a modified dogbone interchange with Forrest Highway, Paris Road and Clifton Road. The interchange split Forrest Highway into two sections, with the northern section of the highway continuing south as the WWH with traffic wanting to continue along the southern part of the highway into Bunbury having to take an exit ramp. This aspect of the design was contentious, as the City of Bunbury wanted for Forrest Highway to be continuous so that more traffic would head into the centre of Bunbury.

Only the northbound entrance and southbound exit ramps were built, with the southbound exit ramp being a loop ramp so that traffic heading towards Bunbury does not have to give way to traffic on Clifton Road. Heading east from the future interchange is Clifton Road, which leads to the town of Brunswick Junction. Heading west is Paris Road, which heads into Australind.

The WWH then passes over the Collie River. Approximately 3 kilometres (1.9 mi) south, the ring road has a dogbone interchange with Raymond Road, which leads to the town of Roelands to the east. A further 3 kilometres (1.9 mi) south, the WWH meets the northern section of South Western Highway at a modified dogbone interchange where the northbound exit ramp is looped. Following that, the WWH will cross over the South Western Railway and then bend to the west, coming to an at-grade intersection with Discovery Road.

The intersection's layout was designed such that Discovery Road traffic has to turn left or right and cannot cross over the ring road. The road then travels east-southeast, bridging over Golding Crescent, the Ferguson River, the Northcliffe railway line and Boyanup–Picton Road. The ring road was cut off from Boyanup-Picton Road. The road intersects with Willinge Drive at a roundabout 2 kilometres (1.2 mi) further. Willinge Drive, also known as the Bunbury Port Access Road, leads to the industrial area of Picton and the Bunbury Port in Vittoria.

Stage three curves to the south, intersecting with Lillydale Road as a roundabout, before curving to the west again and passing under a Yalinda Drive bridge. This section has Jilley Road as a frontage road to the east. Its south-western terminus is an interchange with Bussell Highway. The southbound Bussell Highway carriageway passes over the WWH and then merges with the road.

== History ==
=== Planning ===
The original concept for the originally-named Bunbury Outer Ring Road was developed in the early 1970s with the land for the southern section reserved for a Primary Regional Road in the Greater Bunbury Region scheme. The land was acquired as part of the subdivision process for the southern part of Gelorup in the early 1980s, when it was set aside for future development.

=== Stage one ===
The first stage of the BORR received $15.8 million in funding in the 2010 state budget for land acquisition and pre-construction activities. The BORR's first stage was constructed as part of the second stage of the Bunbury Port Access Road project. This saw the construction of Willinge Drive from South Western Highway to the BORR and the construction of the BORR from South Western Highway to Boyanup-Picton Road. This stage followed on from the Bunbury Port Access Road project's first section, which was Willinge Drive from the Bunbury Port to South Western Highway. The contract for this was awarded to Fulton Hogan at a cost of $134 million, jointly funded by the federal and state governments. Out of that cost, $44 million was for the ring road. Construction was completed in May 2013.

=== Stages two and three ===
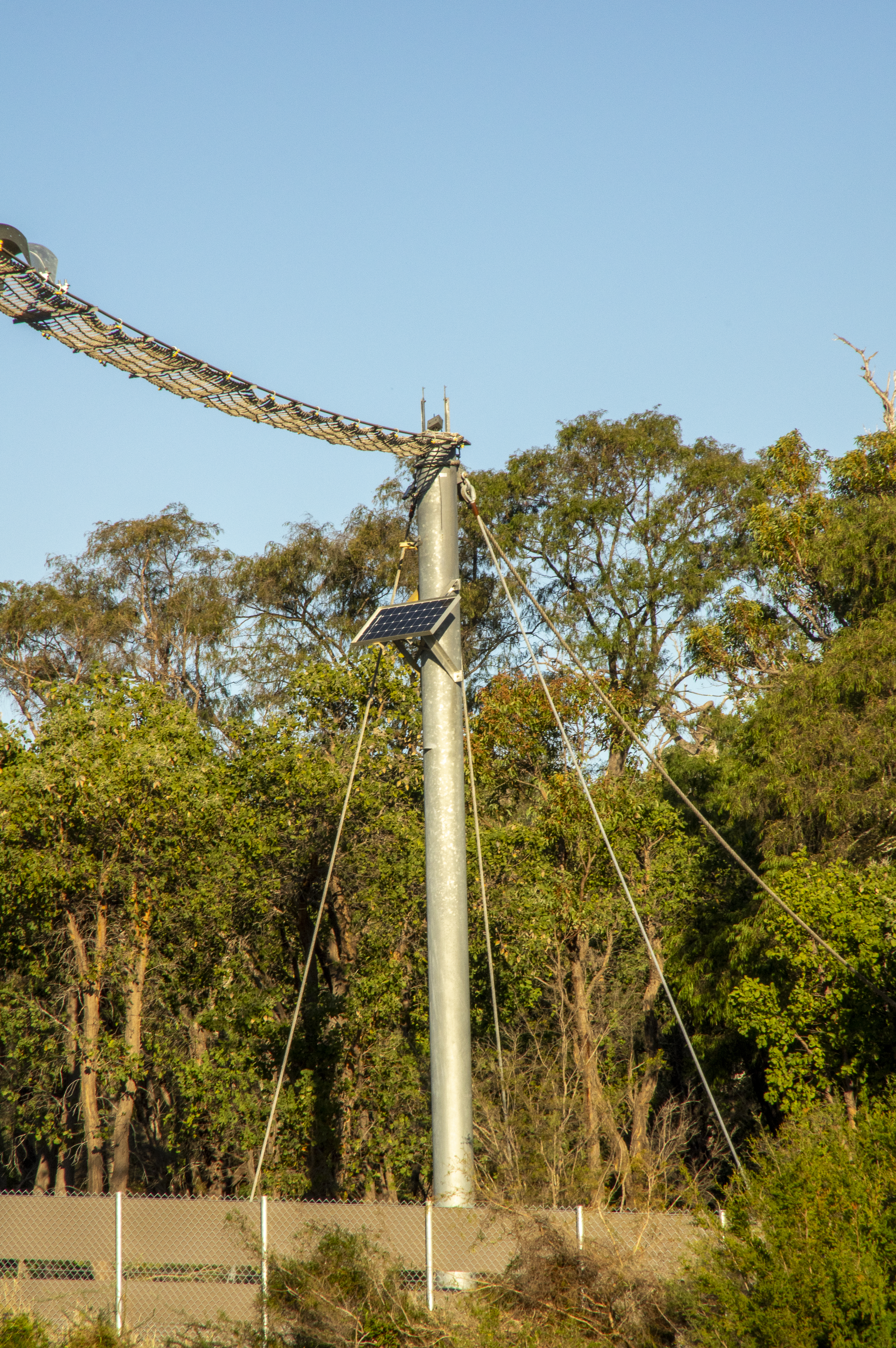
Possum crossing at Davenport on the Wilman Wadandi Hwy

The second stage of the BORR was recommended to be built by Infrastructure Australia's National Infrastructure Plan in 2013.

Expressions of interest were called for in September 2019. The plans at the time had the road be built to a freeway standard with grade separations at all junctions. The project had $681.6 million of federal government funding and $170.4 million of state government funding. During this time, the state government had been lobbying the federal government to include duplication of Bussell Highway within the BORR project. Funding was brought forward by a year in November 2019, allowing construction to begin in early 2021. To help local businesses tender for work on the project, the state government created a Local Capability Fund to award grants to local businesses.

In March 2020, two consortia were shortlisted: the Forrest Alliance, comprising CPB Contractors, Carey MC, Densford Civil, GHD and BG&E; and Southwest Connex, comprising Acciona, NRW Contracting, MACA Civil, Aecom and Aurecon. Due to the COVID-19 recession, the tendering process was fast tracked by three months to create jobs as soon as possible. In April 2020, a contract for early works, including earthworks, fencing and planting, was awarded to Fulton Hogan. Southwest Connex was chosen as the preferred proponent in August 2020, and they were awarded the contract in October 2020, now known under the name of South West Gateway Alliance. The project was billed as the South West's largest ever infrastructure project.

The design of the interchange with South Western Highway was modified to allow movements in all possible directions as part of a redesign released in December 2019. This was in response to the City of Bunbury's fears that the BORR's design encouraged people to bypass Bunbury, although concerns remained with the interchange with Forrest Highway.

Construction commenced on 29 January 2021.

The federal government revealed it would spend an additional $320 million on the project in its March 2022 budget due to labour shortages and an increase in the cost of raw materials. The state government revealed it would spend an additional $80 million on the project in its May 2022 budget, bringing the total cost increase to $400 million. This was accompanied by a decrease in the project's scope, with four interchanges being replaced with at-grade intersections at Discovery Road, Lillydale Road, Willinge Drive and the southern section of South Western Highway. In response to suggestions that the project should be abandoned, Transport Minister Rita Saffioti said "we are mid-way through this project so we believe abandoning it would not be the right decision".

Stage three was controversial as it cut into the habitat of the critically endangered western ringtail possum. The Environmental Protection Authority (EPA) approved stage three in October 2021, determining that the road would go through 60 hectares (150 acres) of the possum's habitat, out of the 6,000 hectares (15,000 acres) of total habitat. To offset the loss in habitat, the EPA recommended that Main Roads Western Australia protect and buy 179 hectares (440 acres) of existing habitat nearby, and create 220 hectares (540 acres) of habitat in places such as the Ludlow State Forest.

Federal environmental approval for stage three was given in June 2022, allowing construction to commence in July 2022. Over 300 people protested when machinery was being moved in, with several people being issued with move-on notices by police for blocking machinery. Former Greens leader Bob Brown spoke at a gathering of protesters, saying "there's alternatives, there's open cleared areas where the proposed road could go but there's no alternative to this woodland for these rare creatures that live in it". On 5 August 2022, clearing for the third stage was paused due to a Federal Court injunction. Three days later, the injunction was extended, and on 9 August, the court dismissed the injunction, allowing clearing to continue.

The final stage was opened in December 2024.

== Junction list ==
LGA	Location	km	mi	Destinations	Notes
Harvey	Australind–Brunswick border	0	0.0	Forrest Highway (National Route 1) north south / Paris Road west / Clifton Road east - Perth, Mandurah, Australind	Northern terminus; Road continues north as Forrest Highway; Grade-separated interchange; Northbound entrance and southbound exit ramps only; State Route 101 northern terminus
Harvey	Roelands	3	1.9	Raymond Road - Australind, Roelands	Dogbone interchange
Dardanup	Waterloo	7	4.3	South Western Highway (State Route 20) / Waterloo Road southwest - Burekup, Waterloo	Modified dogbone interchange: northbound exit ramp looped. Waterloo Road intersects with western roundabout.
Dardanup	Waterloo–Paradise border	11	6.8	Discovery Road – Waterloo	At-grade four-way intersection
Dardanup	Dardanup West–Picton East border	15	9.3	Boyanup–Picton Road, Dardanup West–Picton East	T-junction originally constructed as part of Stage 1, converted to a flyover as part of stage 2
Bunbury	Davenport	17	11	Willinge Drive – Picton, Glen Iris, Vittoria	Roundabout intersection
Bunbury–Capel	Davenport–North Boyanup border	19	12	South Western Highway (National Route 1) – Davenport, Donnybrook, Bridgetown	Roundabout intersection
Capel	North Boyanup	22	14	Lillydale Road - Dalyellup, Gelorup	Roundabout intersection
Capel	Dalyellup–Gelorup border	27	17	Bussell Highway (State Route 10) – Capel, Busselton, Margaret River	Southern terminus; Road continues south as Bussell Highway; Northbound exit and southbound entrance ramps only. State Route 101 southern terminus
1.000 mi = 1.609 km; 1.000 km = 0.621 mi: Closed/former; Incomplete access

== See also ==
- Robertson Drive, also known as the Bunbury Inner Ring Road
- Perth Freight Link, a similarly controversial road project that was cancelled in 2017 due to environmental impacts and a change of government.
- Menang Drive, a similar road constructed around the city of Albany, Western Australia
