= Electoral district of Mitchell (Western Australia) =

Former state electoral district in Western Australia

Mitchell Western Australia—Legislative Assembly
- State: Western Australia
- Dates current: 1983–2008
- Namesake: Sir James Mitchell
- Area: 27.0 km^{2} (10.4 sq mi)

Mitchell was an electoral district of the Legislative Assembly in the Australian state of Western Australia. It existed from 1983 to 2005 and, under the name Leschenault, continued until 2008.

== History ==
Mitchell was created at the 1982 redistribution and was named for Sir James Mitchell GCMG, former premier (1919–1924; 1930–1933) and Lieutenant-Governor of Western Australia (1933–1951), who was born in Dardanup within the original boundaries of the electorate. It was first contested at the 1983 election. The district was initially a reasonably safe Labor seat based in the eastern and southern suburbs of the regional city of Bunbury, but as Bunbury grew, the seat contracted in size and moved northwards, centring on Australind. The seat then switched to the Liberal Party's Dan Sullivan, who held it until its abolishment. At the 2003 redistribution, the seat was renamed as the Commissioners believed the name "Mitchell" had no connection to the seat as it now stood, and the Leschenault Inlet north and northeast of Bunbury was a clear geographic landmark.

The 2007 redistribution, which came into effect at the 2008 election, saw the electorate abolished, with its former area being subsumed into Bunbury (Glen Iris, Pelican Point and Picton), Collie-Preston (Eaton) and Murray-Wellington (Australind, Kingston and Leschenault).

== Geography ==
When it was first created, the seat included the suburbs of Carey Park, Eaton, Gelorup, Glen Iris, Picton and Withers, and the towns of Boyanup, Burekup, Capel, Dardanup, Elgin and Waterloo. Almost half of all votes taken were at Carey Park (70.8% ALP—1986) and Withers (72.1% ALP—1986). Australind at that time was within the Murray-Wellington electorate.

After the 1994 redistribution, taking effect from the 1996 election, the seat contained the suburbs of Australind, most of Carey Park, College Grove, Eaton, Gelorup, Glen Iris and Picton.

After the 2003 redistribution, the seat contained the suburbs of Australind, Eaton, Glen Iris, Leschenault and Picton, as well as the new development areas of Kingston and Pelican Point.

== Members for Mitchell ==
| Member | Party | Term |
|---|---|---|
| David Smith | Labor | 1983–1996 |
| Dan Sullivan | Liberal | 1996–2008 |
| Dan Sullivan | Family First | 2008 |
