= List of State Register of Heritage Places in the Shire of Dardanup =

List of heritage sites in Western Australia

The State Register of Heritage Places is maintained by the Heritage Council of Western Australia. As of 2026, 61 places are heritage-listed in the Shire of Dardanup, of which four are on the State Register of Heritage Places.

== List ==
The Western Australian State Register of Heritage Places, as of 2026, lists the following four state registered places within the Shire of Dardanup:

Place name	Place #	Street number	Street name	Suburb or town	Co-ordinates	Notes & former names	Photo
St Mary's Anglican Church, Dardanup	689	23	Picton-Boyanup Road	Dardanup	33.400731°S 115.753784°E		
Thomas Little Memorial Hall	3011		Ferguson Road	Dardanup	33.397818°S 115.754658°E	Church of the Immaculate Conception (former), Convent School, Our Lady of Lourdes School	
Dardanup State School (former)	4628		Ferguson Road	Dardanup	33.398445°S 115.755013°E	Don Hewison Centre	
Wellington Dam	6344	333	Wellington Forest Road	Wellington Forest	33.402222°S 115.979167°E	Also referred to as Wellington Weir and Hydro-electric Station Listed in InHerit under the Shire of Collie but located partially in both the Shire of Collie and the Shire of Dardanup	
