= Dardanup =

Dardanup may refer to:

- Shire of Dardanup, a local government area in Western Australia
  - Dardanup, Western Australia, a town in the Shire of Dardanup
  - Dardanup West, Western Australia, a locality in the Shire of Dardanup
