= Wellington Mill, Western Australia =

Wellington Mill
- Suburb
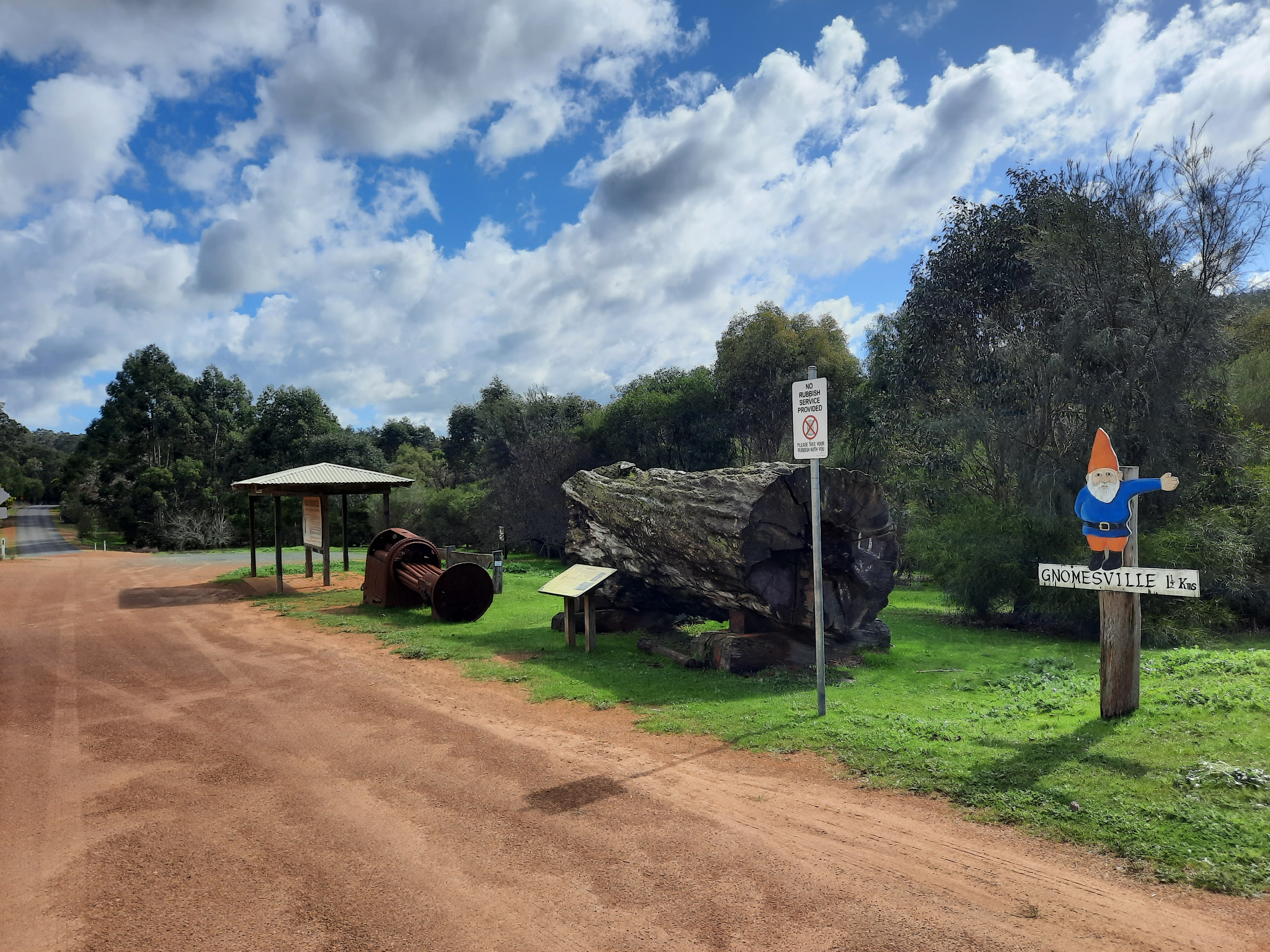
- Wellington Mill tourist bay, with Jarrah log, saw and directions to Gnomesville

- Coordinates: 33.457°S 115.908°E
- Country: Australia
- State: Western Australia
- LGA(s): Shire of Dardanup
- Location: 28 km (17 mi) southeast of Bunbury; 15 km (9.3 mi) southeast of Dardanup; 15 km (9.3 mi) northeast of Donnybrook
- Established: 1896

Government
  - State electorate(s): Collie-Preston
  - Federal division(s): Forrest

Area
  - Total: 13.4 km^{2} (5.2 sq mi)

Population
  - Total(s): 151 (SAL 2021)
- Postcode: 6236
Suburbs around Wellington Mill
| Ferguson | Wellington Forest | Wellington Forest |
| Ferguson | Wellington Mill | Wellington Forest |
| Wellington Forest | Wellington Forest | Wellington Forest |

Wellington Mill is a locality in the Ferguson River valley, in the Greater Bunbury sub-region of South West region of Western Australia.

== History ==
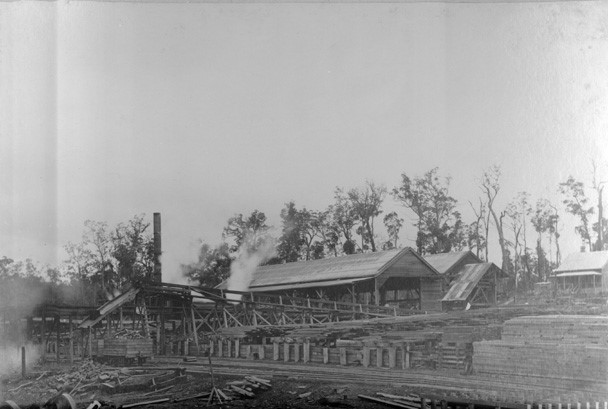
Exterior of Wellington Mill, c. 1900

In 1881 a timber mill was established in the area. In 1896 the Canning Jarrah Timber Company established a timber mill and town at Wellington Mill, which when established was the largest private timber town in Western Australia. The timber mills closed in 1929 and a fire destroyed most of the town in 1950.

== Attractions ==
=== Gnomesville ===
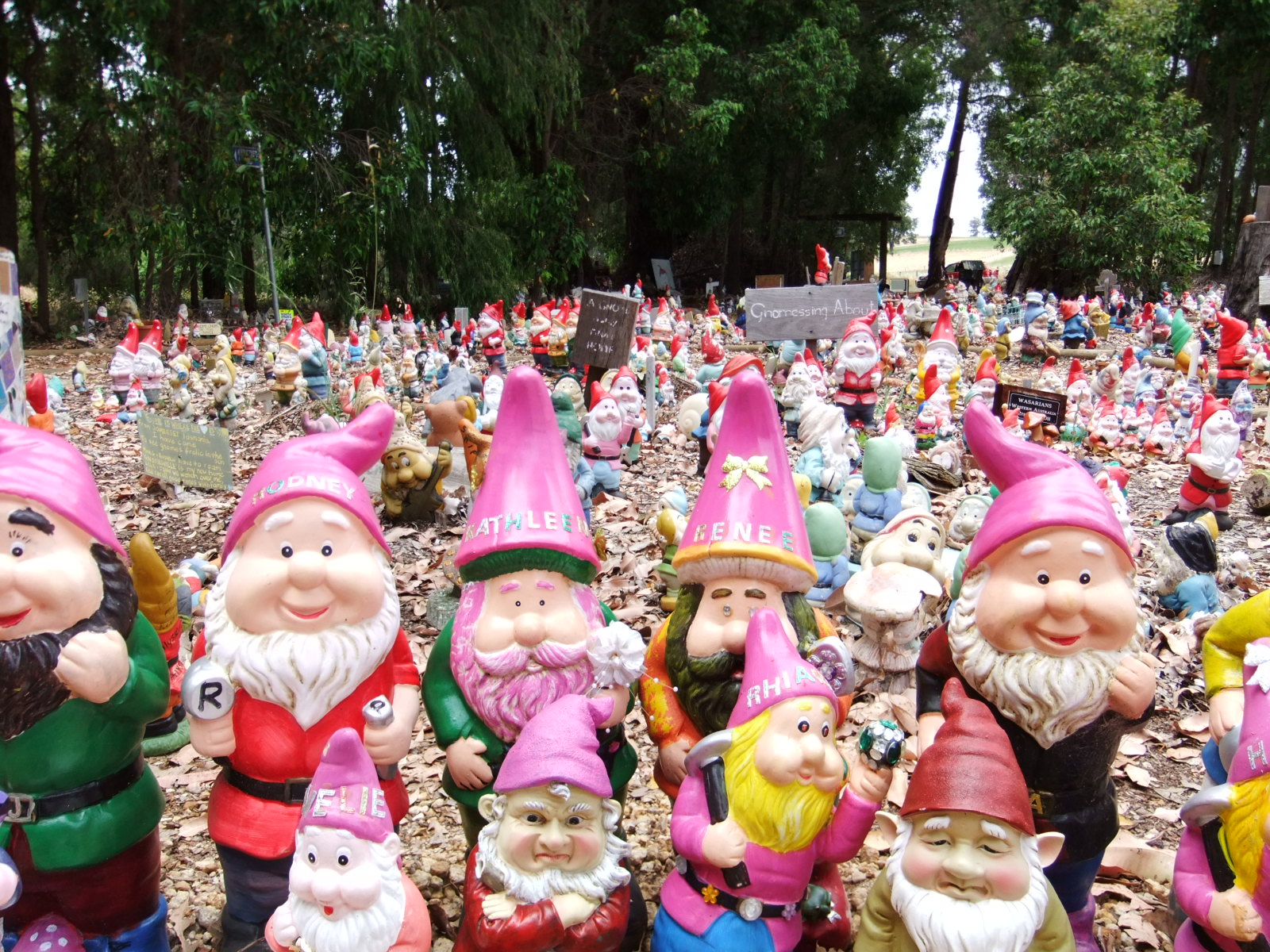
Some of the residents of Gnomesville which is located north of Dardenup in the Ferguson valley in the South West of Western Australia

Gnomesville is a tourist attraction comprising a collection of over 3,000 gnomes statues next to the intersection of Wellington Mill Road, Wellington-Lowden Road and Ferguson Road.

It began in 1995 when gnomes were placed in the intersection in protest of the construction of a roundabout, and has been added to by visitors over time.

In November 2024, a severe storm dumped more than 100 mm of rain on the Ferguson Valley, flooding the creek through Gnomesville and smashing or displacing hundreds of figurines. Shire of Dardanup staff began restoration work the next day and are developing a long‑term master plan for the site.
