= Picton East, Western Australia =

Locality in the Shire of Dardanup, Western Australia

Picton East
- other
- Coordinates: 33.35°S 115.72°E
- Country: Australia
- State: Western Australia
- LGA: Shire of Dardanup
- Location: 155 km (96 mi) from Perth; 8 km (5.0 mi) from Bunbury; 7 km (4.3 mi) from Dardanup

Government
  - State electorate: Collie-Preston
  - Federal division: Forrest

Area
  - Total: 12.5 km^{2} (4.8 sq mi)

Population
  - Total: 141 (SAL 2021)
- Postcode: 6229
Localities around Picton East
Pelican Point	Eaton	Waterloo
Picton	Picton East	Waterloo
Davenport	Dardanup West	Paradise

Picton East is a predominantly rural locality of the Shire of Dardanup in the South West region of Western Australia. Apart from farm land, the suburb includes commercial areas in its central section. Its northern boundary is formed by the Forrest Highway while the South Western Highway and the South Western Railway also runs through it.

Picton East is located on the traditional land of the Noongar people.
