= BORR =

BORR may refer to:

- Butterworth Outer Ring Road
- Wilman Wadandi Highway, formerly the Bunbury Outer Ring Road

== See also ==
- Borr
