= List of State Register of Heritage Places in the Shire of Collie =

The State Register of Heritage Places is maintained by the Heritage Council of Western Australia. As of 2026, 199 places are heritage-listed in the Shire of Collie, of which eight are on the State Register of Heritage Places.

== List ==
The Western Australian State Register of Heritage Places, as of 2026, lists the following eight state registered places within the Shire of Collie:

Place name	Place #	Location	Suburb or town	Co-ordinates	Built	State registered	Notes	Photo
All Saints' Anglican Church	552	Corner Mungalup Road and Venn Street	Collie	33°21′43″S 116°09′05″E	1915	6 February 1998	Also referred to as St Peter's Anglican Church; Federation Romanesque church designed by architects Eales and Cohen; Mural by London-born artist Phil Goatcher	
Collie Court House	535	Wittenoom Street at corner of Pendleton Street	Collie	33°21′46″S 116°09′29″E	1913	14 December 2001	Single storey brick and tile building in Federation Free style	
Collie Post Office (former)	550	63 Throssell Street	Collie	33°21′41″S 116°09′28″E	1908	11 October 1994	Also referred to as Post Master's Restaurant; Representative of Western Australian post offices of the 1900s, but the later extension gives the building some rarity, now converted to a restaurant	
Railway Goods Shed & Footbridge	540	Forrest Street	Collie	33°21′34″S 116°09′17″E	1896	28 August 1992	Also referred to as Railway Prep Shed; Large structure of steel clad with corrugated iron and associated footbridge; Part of the Brunswick Junction to Narrogin railway line	
Railway Round House with Turntable	541	Railway Reserve North of Coalfields Highway	Collie	33°21′19″S 116°08′28″E	1958	25 June 2019	Also referred to as Railway Roundhouse; A single storey, timber and corrugated iron locomotive Round House with associated turntable; The only extant railway Round House in Western Australia; Part of the Brunswick Junction to Narrogin railway line	
Soldiers' Park	15695	316 Johnston Street	Collie	33°21′28″S 116°09′24″E	1921	25 May 2010	Also referred to as Collie War Memorial and Soldiers Park & Honour Avenue; A variety of memorial forms in one place, being an obelisk, a rose gardens, an honour avenue and memorial gates; Memorial to Aboriginal Servicemen, erected in 2000	
Suspension footbridge	3551	Collie River	Collie	33°21′16″S 116°09′41″E	1904	7 October 1997	One of very few suspension foot bridges in Western Australia	
Wellington Dam	6344	333 Wellington Forest Road	Wellington Forest	33°24′08″S 115°58′45″E	1933	3 February 2009	Also referred to as Wellington Weir and Hydro-electric Station; The Hydro-electric Station was the first of only two such facility constructed by the State in Western Australia; Listed under the Shire of Collie but located partially in both the former and the Shire of Dardanup	
