= Ferguson, Western Australia =

Locality in the Shire of Dardanup, Western Australia

Ferguson
- other
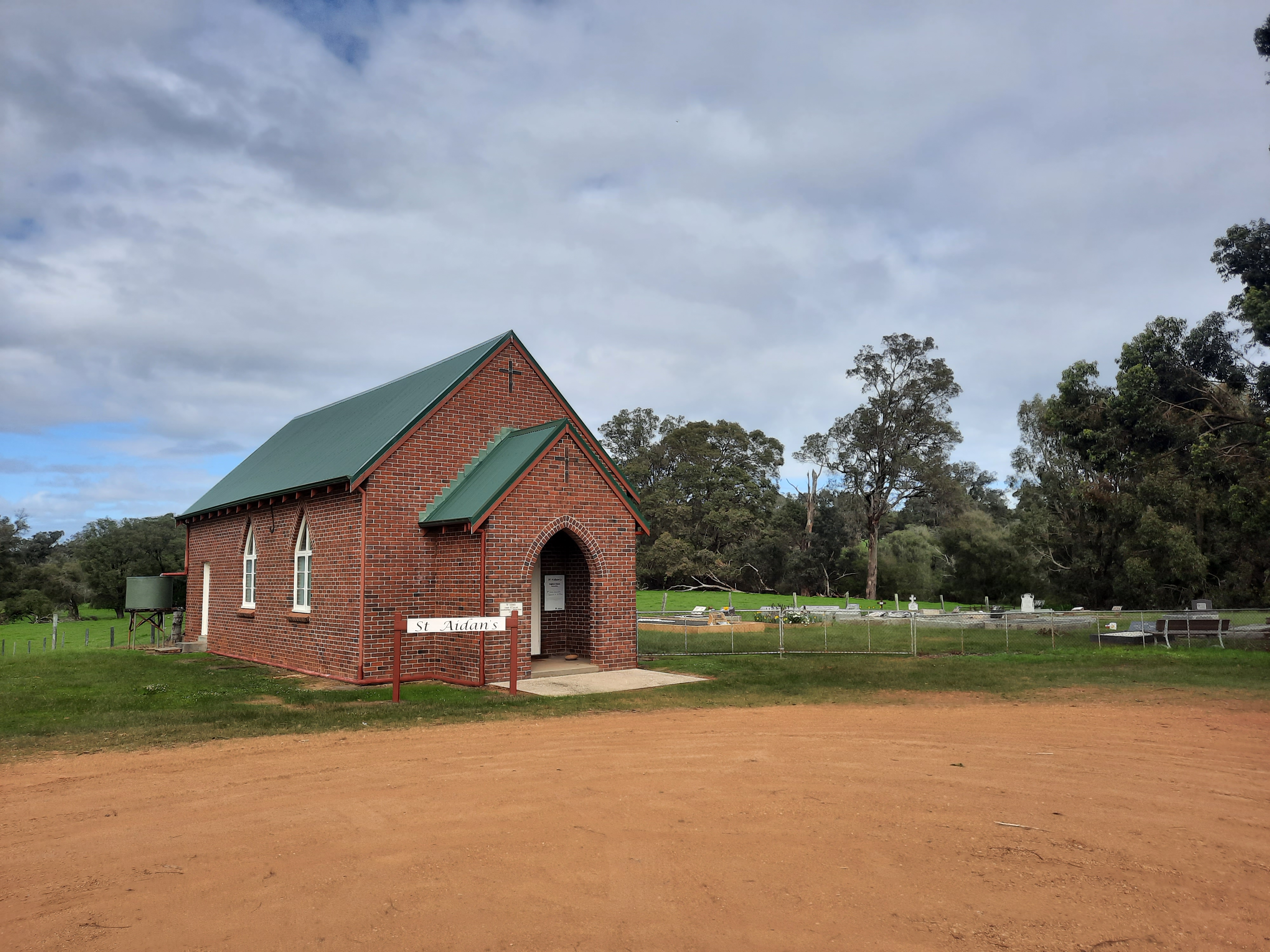
- The heritage listed St Aidan's Church
- Coordinates: 33.44°S 115.85°E
- Country: Australia
- State: Western Australia
- LGA: Shire of Dardanup
- Location: 166 km (103 mi) from Perth; 25 km (16 mi) from Bunbury; 11 km (6.8 mi) from Dardanup

Government
  - State electorate: Collie-Preston
  - Federal division: Forrest

Area
  - Total: 41.4 km^{2} (16.0 sq mi)

Population
  - Total: 233 (SAL 2021)
- Postcode: 6236
Localities around Ferguson
Crooked Brook	Henty	Henty
Crooked Brook	Ferguson	Wellington Forest
Crooked Brook	Wellington Forest	Wellington Mill

Ferguson is a rural locality of the Shire of Dardanup in the South West region of Western Australia. The locality of Ferguson and the Ferguson Valley are marketed as a tourist destination. The Ferguson River runs through the locality, which was named after John Ferguson who owned a property along the river, by the surveyor H.M. Ommanney in 1844.

Ferguson is located on the traditional land of the Noongar people.

The locality is home to three heritage listed sites: the Ferguson District Hall, St Aidan's Church and cemetery and the Upper Ferguson School site. The St Aidan's Church dates back to 1953, replacing an earlier church from 1879, while the cemetery at the church dates back to 1842. The Ferguson District Hall has a similar history, dating back to 1966, when it replaced an earlier hall from 1905. The Ferguson School operated from 1893 to 1971, when the school was closed and the land and building sold, with now just a plaque left at the site to commemorate the former school.
