= Burekup, Western Australia =

Burekup
- Town
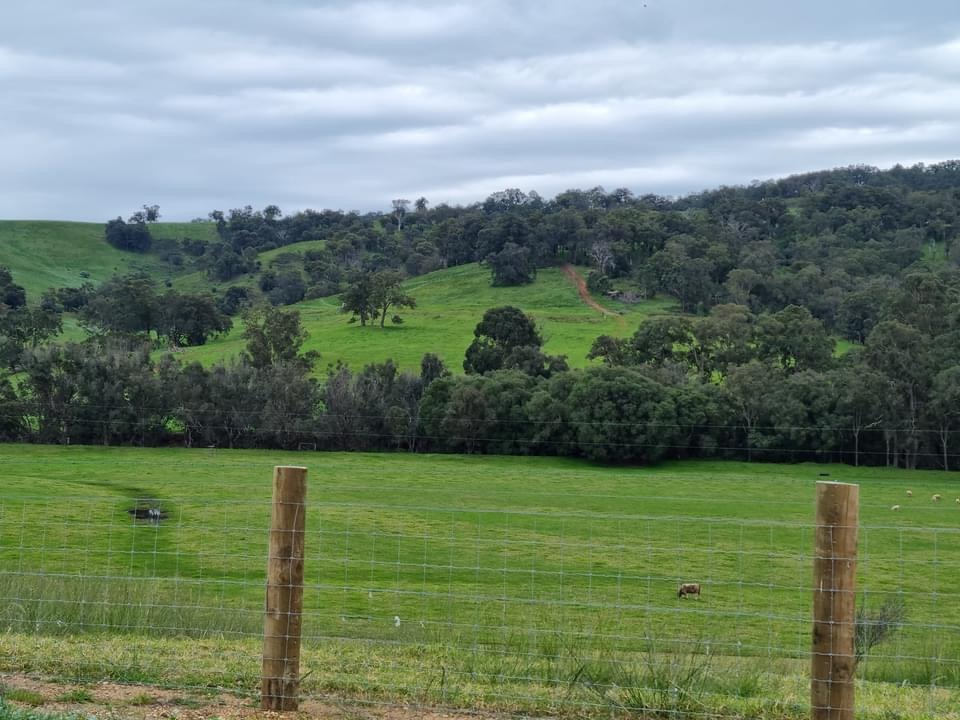

- Coordinates: 33°19′0″S 115°48′0″E
- Country: Australia
- State: Western Australia
- LGA(s): Shire of Dardanup
- Location: 167 km (104 mi) south of Perth; 6 km (3.7 mi) south west of Brunswick Junction; 16 km (9.9 mi) east of Bunbury
- Established: 1973

Government
  - State electorate(s): Collie-Preston
  - Federal division(s): Forrest

Area
  - Total: 40.5 km^{2} (15.6 sq mi)
- Elevation: 23 m (75 ft)

Population
  - Total(s): 591 (UCL 2021)
- Postcode: 6227
Localities around Burekup
Roelands	Roelands	Roelands
Waterloo	Burekup	Roelands
Waterloo	Henty	Wellington Forest

Burekup is a small town located on the South Western Highway in the South West region of Western Australia.

The town is built on the Collie River and was originally a railway siding on the Pinjarra-Picton line that was established in 1910 and known at the time as Boorekup. Following a request from the Shire of Dardanup, the town was gazetted in 1973.

Burekup is located on the traditional land of the Noongar people. Boorekup is the Aboriginal Australian name for a wildflower that grows in the area.
