= Eaton Community College =

Location
- Eaton, Western Australia; Australia; 33°19′05″S 115°43′19″E

Information
- Type: Public co-educational high day school
- Motto: Encouraging, Caring, Challenging
- Established: 2003; 23 years ago
- Educational authority: WA Department of Education
- Principal: Gail Allen
- Enrolment: 379 (2012)
- Campus type: Rural
- Colours: Red, blue, and gold
- Website: eatoncc.wa.edu.au

Eaton Community College is a comprehensive public co-educational high day school, located in Eaton, Western Australia, sited to the east of Bunbury and 145 kilometres (90 mi) south of Perth.

The school was established in 2003 and caters for students from Year 7 to Year 12. The school welcomed the first Year 11 cohort in 2009 and Year 12 cohort in 2010. The campus is divided between the Middle School which houses students from Year 7 to 9 and the Senior School that houses Year 10 to Year 12. Facilities such as the recreation centre and ovals are shared with the Shire of Dardanup.

The campus site also includes 2 hectares (5 acres) of wetlands that form the focal point of the buildings which in turn are surrounded by spacious landscaped gardens.

Enrolments at the school were 296 in 2007, 256 in 2008, 325 in 2009, 364 in 2010, 334 in 2011 and 379 in 2012.

== See also ==
- List of schools in rural Western Australia
