= Millbridge, Western Australia =

Millbridge
- Suburb
- Coordinates: 33°18′07″S 115°43′59″E
- Country: Australia
- State: Western Australia
- City: Bunbury
- LGA(s): Shire of Dardanup
- Location: 9 km (5.6 mi) from Bunbury
- Established: 2004

Government
  - State electorate(s): Collie-Preston
  - Federal division(s): Forrest

Area
  - Total: 1.9 km^{2} (0.73 sq mi)

Population
  - Total(s): 2,736 (SAL 2021)
- Postcode: 6232
Suburbs around Millbridge
	Australind	Kingston
Eaton	Millbridge	Waterloo
Picton

Millbridge is a northeastern suburb of Bunbury, Western Australia, adjoining Eaton 9 km from the centre of Bunbury. At the 2021 census, it had a population of 2,736. Its local government area is the Shire of Dardanup.

== History ==
In 2003, the Geographic Names Committee of the Department of Land Information approved the new locality of Millbridge, formerly part of Eaton in the Shire of Dardanup.

Millbridge Private Estate is being developed by the Ardross Group of Companies . The name "Millbridge" is derived from Millars Creek, which runs through the landholding, "and the numerous existing and future bridges that span the nearby and surrounding waterways" (four bridges, two on the Forrest Highway over the Collie River and Millars Creek, a third bridge that extended Millbridge Boulevard across Millars Creek opened in late 2007, and the fourth bridge connecting Eaton Drive to Australind opened in March 2018). The name Millar is believed to derive from either the Millars Karri and Jarrah Company, which milled timber in the district for much of the 20th century, or from a local resident with the surname Millar who fished in the creek.

== Geography ==
The suburb of Millbridge is bounded to the west by Eaton Drive, to the south by Illawarra Drive, to the east by the Forrest Highway and to the north by the Collie River.

== Facilities ==
Millbridge is currently dependent on neighbouring Eaton for shopping, education and recreation, although it is envisaged by the developer that two schools, a neighbourhood shopping centre and commercial precinct will be built. The suburb contains a mix of jarrah, marri, sheoak and banksia woodland as well as wetland areas with flooded gums and paperbarks, which provide habitat to a wide range of waterbirds and mammals.

== Transport ==
Millbridge has a bus service by the Bunbury Transport Authority
