= Henty, Western Australia =

Locality in the Shire of Dardanup, Western Australia

Henty
- other
- Coordinates: 33.38°S 115.83°E
- Country: Australia
- State: Western Australia
- LGA: Shire of Dardanup
- Location: 158 km (98 mi) from Perth; 20 km (12 mi) from Bunbury; 8 km (5.0 mi) from Dardanup

Government
  - State electorate: Collie-Preston
  - Federal division: Forrest

Area
  - Total: 39.5 km^{2} (15.3 sq mi)

Population
  - Total: 142 (SAL 2021)
- Postcode: 6236
Localities around Henty
Waterloo	Burekup	Wellington Forest
Paradise	Henty	Wellington Forest
Dardanup	Ferguson	Wellington Forest

Henty is a rural locality of the Shire of Dardanup in the South West region of Western Australia.

Henty is located on the traditional land of the Noongar people.
