= Electoral district of Mitchell =

There are a number of electoral districts by the name of Mitchell:

- Electoral district of Mitchell (South Australia)
- Electoral district of Mitchell (Western Australia) (1983–2005), renamed Electoral district of Leschenault in 2005 and abolished in 2008.
- Electoral district of Mitchell (Queensland), abolished in 1932.
- Mitchell (UK Parliament constituency)
