= Dan Sullivan (Australian politician) =

Australian politician

Member of the Western Australian Parliament for Mitchell
- In office 14 December 1996 – 26 February 2005
- Preceded by: David Smith
- Succeeded by: Seat abolished
- Constituency: Leschenault

Member of the Western Australian Parliament for Leschenault
- In office 26 February 2005 – 6 September 2008
- Preceded by: New creation
- Succeeded by: Seat abolished

Personal details
- Born: 9 June 1960 (age 65) Kuching, Crown Colony of Sarawak
- Party: Liberals then Family First Party
- Spouse: Lee
- Profession: Public Relations Consultant

Daniel Frank Barron-Sullivan (born 9 June 1960 in Kuching, Sarawak) is an Australian former politician.

== Political career ==
He was a Liberal member and later an independent member of the Western Australian Legislative Assembly representing the electorate of Mitchell now known as the electorate of Leschenault from December 1996 to September 2008. From 2001 to 2005, Sullivan was the Western Australian Liberal deputy leader, under the leadership of briefly Richard Court and then Colin Barnett.

Sullivan quit the Liberal Party in 2008 after losing his seat in an electoral redistribution and expressed dissatisfaction with current Liberal party leader Troy Buswell. On 20 June 2008, he created a new party by merging with the WA Family First party to create the WAFamilyFirst.com Party (the 'new' party continued to operate as the WA branch of Family First, Australia).

In the 2008 election, Sullivan ran for the South-West Region seat in the Legislative Council but only managed to attract 3% of the vote, and consequently was unsuccessful in his attempt to get reelected.
