= Bunbury Airport =

Bunbury Airport Bunbury City Airport
- IATA: BUY; ICAO: YBUN

Summary
- Airport type: Public
- Operator: Bunbury City Council
- Location: Bunbury, Western Australia
- Elevation AMSL: 53 ft / 16 m
- Coordinates: 33°22′41″S 115°40′37″E

Map
- Location in Western Australia

Runways
Direction	Length		Surface
Direction	m	ft	Surface
07/25	1,015	3,330	Asphalt
- Sources: Australian AIP and aerodrome chart

Bunbury Airport (IATA: BUY, ICAO: YBUN) is an airport servicing the Western Australian city of Bunbury. Bunbury Airport is located 8 km (5 mi) south-east of the city centre and is the only airport serving the city. The airport is used largely as a facility for General Aviation, pilot training and emergency services. Bunbury Airport serves an area that includes the City of Bunbury and the surrounding districts of Harvey, Dardanup, Capel and Donnybrook-Balingup.

== History ==
The City of Bunbury is the owner and operator of Bunbury Airport. Council first investigated the possibility of an airstrip in 1965 and with the help of a band of enthusiastic aviators and input from the Department of Civil Aviation, the airstrip became operational in 1969. It has evolved to present day with council funds, government grants/funds, and operational input from the Bunbury Aero Club. The aerodrome is a 'registered' airport with the Civil Aviation Safety Authority (CASA).

Recent upgrades to the airport include the following:

- 2008 – construction of a new Patient Transfer Building to provide better facilities for the approximate 750 annual visits by the Royal Flying Doctor Service (RFDS).
- 2009 – development of an additional 15 hangar sites.
- 2010 – construction of a 700 metre long parallel taxiway.
- 2012 – construction of run-up bays and a helipad.
- 2013 – installation of LED runway and taxiway lighting.
- 2015 – development of an additional 20 hangar sites.
- 2016 – construction of a rescue helicopter base.
- 2017 – installation of an Automatic Weather Information Station (AWIS).
- 2018 – installation of a weather camera, construction of a helipad and installation of a secondary IWI.

== Operations and facilities ==
Bunbury Airport has a single sealed runway, 07/25 which is 1,222 m × 18 m (4,009 ft × 59 ft) wide. Due to the proximity of the South Western Highway, there is a 206 m (676 ft) permanently displaced threshold at the runway 25 end to allow sufficient clearance over the road. Because of this, the available landing distance is 1,015 m (3,330 ft). The airport is currently restricted to aircraft with a maximum take-off weight less than 5,700 kg (12,600 lb). Runway 07/25 is equipped with low intensity, pilot activated runway lighting for night operations. There is no control tower and pilots must co-ordinate arrivals and departures using a Common Traffic Advisory Frequency.

Three flying schools and 1 facility operate out of Bunbury Airport, they are: AirChartersWest, Bunbury Aero Club, Bunbury Flying School and AirSportsWA. The schools and airport are a major Recreational Aviation Australia approved flight training facility.

Bunbury Airport currently averages 13,000 aircraft movements per annum. The airport is home to a permanent rescue helicopter base operated by the Department of Fire & Emergency Services, seasonal water bombers operated by the Parks & Wildlife Services section of the Department of Biodiversity, Conservation and Attractions and significant visitation by the Royal Flying Doctor Service (RFDS).

== See also ==
- List of airports in Western Australia
- Aviation transport in Australia
