= South Western Highway =

Highway in Western Australia

South Western Highway Western Australia
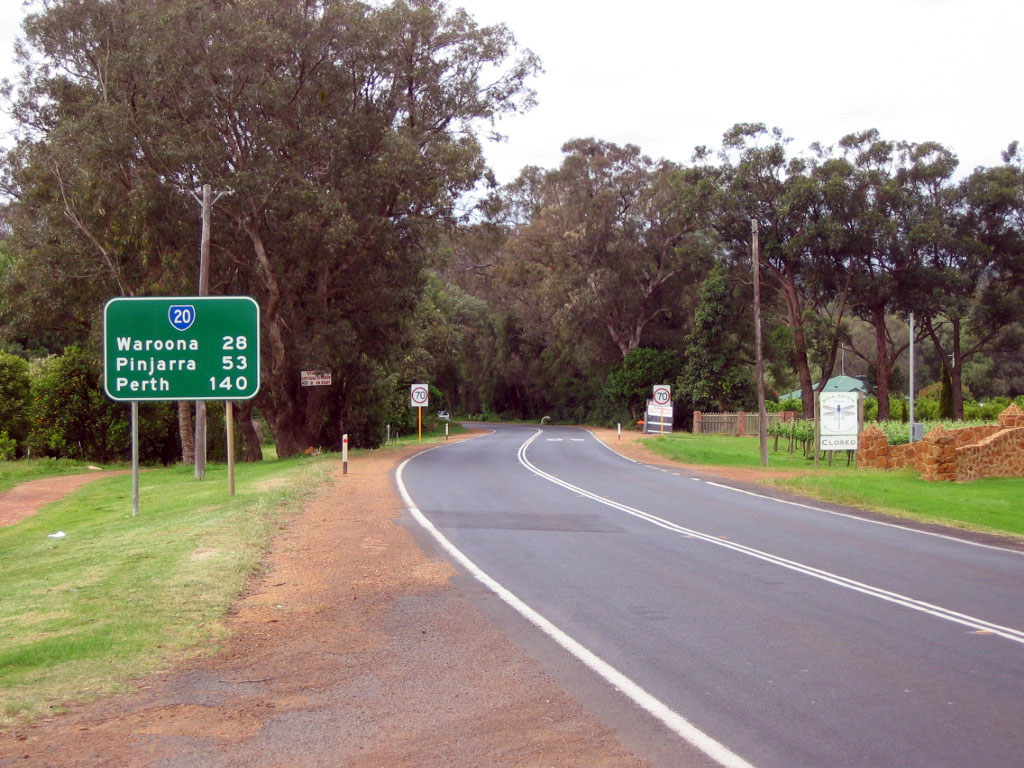
- View north of Harvey

General information
- Type: Highway
- Length: 406 km (252 mi)
- Route number(s): National Route 1 (Bunbury – Walpole); State Route 20 (Armadale – Bunbury); State Route 22 (Mundijong)

Major junctions
- Northwest end: Albany Highway (State Route 30), Armadale, Perth
- Thomas Road (State Route 21); Pinjarra Road; Coalfields Highway (State Route 107); Wilman Wadandi Highway (State Route 101); Robertson Drive (National Route 1 / State Route 10); Brockman Highway; Muir Highway (State Route 102); Vasse Highway
- Southeast end: South Coast Highway (National Route 1), Walpole

Location(s)
- Major settlements: Serpentine, North Dandalup, Pinjarra, Waroona, Yarloop, Harvey, Brunswick Junction, Bunbury, Donnybrook, Bridgetown, Manjimup

Highway system
- Highways in Australia; National Highway • Freeways in Australia; Highways in Western Australia

South Western Highway is a highway in the South West region of Western Australia connecting Perth's southeast with Walpole. It is a part of the Highway 1 network for most of its length. It is about 406 kilometres (252 mi) long.

== Route description ==
=== Perth to Bunbury ===
From Perth, the highway, signed as State Route 20, starts from the Albany Highway junction in Armadale, 28 kilometres (17 mi) from Perth, and follows a north–south route 20–30 kilometres (12–19 mi) inland from the coast, passing through several agricultural and timber towns that sprang up in the 1890s when the nearby South Western Railway came through, such as Pinjarra, Waroona, Yarloop and Harvey.

In January 2016, the Samson Brook bridge, one of the highway bridges near Waroona, was damaged by a bushfire.

Just past Brunswick Junction, the highway heads southwest towards Western Australia's third-largest city, Bunbury. The typical scenery on this part of the highway includes small dairy farms and orchards, jarrah and marri remnant forests and pine plantations.

Until the 1980s, the Armadale-Bunbury section was part of National Highway 1, but following the upgrading of Old Coast Road and construction of the Mandurah bypass, Highway 1 now follows the coastal route via Kwinana Freeway and Old Coast Road to Bunbury passing through the resort town of Mandurah.

=== In Bunbury ===
The highway splits into two roads at Bunbury and becomes discontinuous. The northern half from Perth terminates, along with State Route 20, at Robertson Drive in Bunbury's industrial suburb of Picton. The southern half of South Western Highway then appears at a separate intersection, one kilometre (0.62 mi) to the south along Robertson Drive, where it picks up the National Route 1 designation. It then runs southeast past Bunbury Airport towards Boyanup.

The highway actually used to follow what is now Boyanup-Picton Road from Picton via Dardanup, but changed to the present shorter route in the 1980s.

=== Bunbury to Walpole ===
From Bunbury, the highway goes through Boyanup and on to Donnybrook, the heart of WA's apple country. From then on the highway passes through thick forests featuring many native trees like jarrah, marri and karri. The region was settled much later than other parts of south western WA, under a soldier resettlement scheme beginning in 1919. Typical scenery is farmland interspersed with forests and small timber towns.

The highway then goes through Bridgetown (where it meets the Brockman Highway from Augusta and Nannup), Manjimup and finally to Walpole. This part of the highway, especially from Manjimup, is sparsely populated and very thickly forested, with abundant wildlife and wildflowers as well as many old growth trees, especially the giant karri.

From Walpole, the Highway 1 continues as South Coast Highway to Albany.

=== Major towns ===
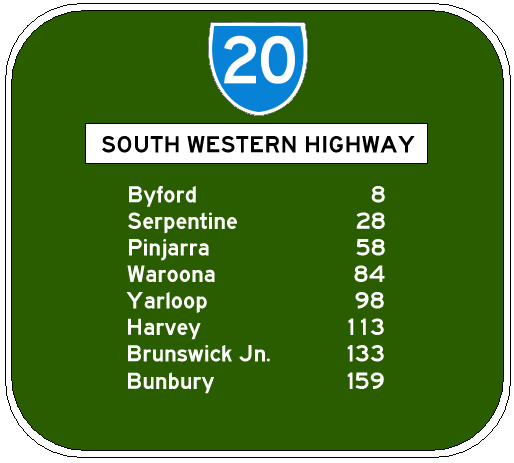
Approximate road distances (in kilometres) of towns from Armadale

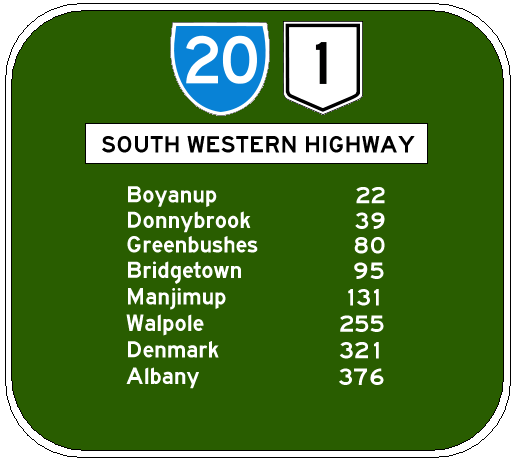
Approximate road distances (in kilometres) of towns from Bunbury

- Armadale
- Byford
- Pinjarra
- Waroona
- Yarloop
- Harvey
- Brunswick Junction
- Bunbury
- Boyanup
- Donnybrook
- Bridgetown
- Manjimup
- Walpole

== History ==
Following the establishment of the Swan River Colony, the earliest report of exploration of the district around what is now Bunbury is from Lieutenant H. W. Bunbury in December 1836. The route he – and later others – took was slow and hazardous, taking four days to cover around 80 miles (130 km), and crossing four rivers. The route began with passage from Perth to Pinjarra, before turning south-west and passing through low, open scrubland, and subsequently a medium-timbered area with low marshes. The first river to cross was the Harvey River, which could only be forded by horses at a single point, near the river mouth. Continuing south-westward, the northern tip of Leschenault Estuary was reached, and its shores followed before curving around into Bunbury. The last stretch of approximately 19 kilometres (12 mi) was the most dangerous for many years, as it required precarious crossings at the Collie and Preston Rivers.

In an initial attempt to settle the area, the government declared the land open for pastoral settlement by ordinary settlers, but little progress was made. By 1840, the population was just fifty-three, and most of those were in or near Bunbury (then known as Port Leschenault). The settlement of Australind by the Western Australian Land Company in 1840–41 prompted the first real need for a good quality road to Perth. Throughout much of 1842, there was much debate and discussion over providing a new route to Bunbury. A coastal route from Fremantle had been proposed, while an alternative proposal published on 11 May 1842 was a new route from Pinjarra to Bunbury, via an upstream crossing of the Harvey River, where a bridge could easily be built. The coastal route would require a ferry to cross the Murray River's estuary, (Note: Now known as the Peel Harvey Estuary.) and did not go through Pinjarra, a significant settlement in the area; however, it would be shorter, had more water along the route, and did go through the village of Mandurah, with a population of twenty-nine people from six families. During the winter of 1842, the existing route became impassable, and Clifton decided to undertake the creation of the proposed coastal route. He sent his company's men to clear the path and make a road.

By the second half of the nineteenth century, the importance of the coast road was diminishing. For most of its length, the road went through well-timbered, sandy limestone country of little value to agriculture, and settlers in the vicinity of the road were scarce. In contrast, settlements had spread and prospered in the foothills of the Darling Scarp, and on 1 July 1853, Colonial Secretary Frederick Barlee announced a new proposal for a Perth–Pinjarra–Bunbury route along the foothills, with a 20-metre (66 ft) width, mostly following the alignment of previous tracks. Between 1864 and 1876, two parties of convicts were involved in the making of the road.

A road from Bunbury to Boyanup, called the Blackwood Road, existed as early as 1864. A bi-weekly mail route from Boyanup to Bridgetown via Preston, Balingup, and Greenbushes was established by 1891; it also extended further south to Balbarrup on a weekly basis. Surveying of a direct Bridgetown–Albany route was requested in January 1871, so that an electric telegraph line could be established, but the government surveyors were overwhelmed by other work. Surveying of the route from Manjimup (south of Bridgetown, adjacent to Balbarrup) was undertaken in 1909 by Fred S. Brockman.

Following World War I, the government intended to settle returning servicemen in the far south-west of the state. To determine the public works required, a flying survey was undertaken. The route between Manjimup and Walpole (then known as Nornalup) was reported to be overgrown and impassable. The Public Works Department was tasked with clearing the route and forming a road, with works gradually progressing from about 1919 onwards. By October 1921, £A 16,000, equivalent to A$1.44 million in 2022, had been spent on upgrading the dirt track to a formed and gravelled road, with works expected to be completed over the 1921–22 summer at a cost of £A 2,000, equivalent to A$186,100 in 2022.

The road from Bunbury through Bridgetown to Manjimup was improved in 1926, as one of the Main Road Board's first projects. The worst segments were identified for reconstruction, as part of an ongoing process to create a high-quality highway.

The name South Western Highway was suggested for the road from Armadale to Pemberton in 1940 by the Under-Secretary for Lands. The name was in common usage by March 1941, and in July 1941, the name was officially applied to "the main road from Armadale to Pemberton via Pinjarra, Harvey, Picton Junction, Boyanup, Donnybrook, Bridgetown and Manjimup". The northern end was at the Perth–Albany road (Note: Later named Albany Highway.) in Armadale, and the southern end was at Brockman Street, Pemberton.

== Major intersections ==
=== Armadale to Picton ===
LGA	Location	km	mi	Destinations	Notes
Armadale	Armadale–Mount Nasura–Mount Richon tripoint	0	0.0	Albany Highway (State Route 14) north, east / Armadale Road (State Route 14) south – Perth, Cockburn Central, Williams, Albany	Traffic light intersection; South Western Highway continues as Albany Highway north of this point. State Route 20 northern terminus.
Serpentine–Jarrahdale	Byford–Darling Downs boundary	6.4	4.0	Thomas Road (State Route 21) – Kwinana Beach, Rockingham	Traffic light intersection; current connection between South Western Highway and the southern terminus of Tonkin Highway (State Route 4)
Serpentine–Jarrahdale	Byford	8.3	5.2	Abernethy Road west / Beenyup Road east	Traffic light intersection
Serpentine–Jarrahdale	Mundijong–Jarrahdale boundary	17.8	11.1	Watkins Road (State Route 22) – Mundijong, Rockingham	State Route 22 northern concurrency terminus
Serpentine–Jarrahdale	Mundijong–Jarrahdale–Mardella tripoint	18.2	11.3	Jarrahdale Road (State Route 22/Tourist Drive 206) east – Jarrahdale, Mount Cooke / Shanley Road west	State Route 22 southern concurrency terminus, Tourist Drive 206 northern concurrency terminus
Serpentine River		24.4	15.2	Serpentine River bridge	
Serpentine–Jarrahdale	Serpentine	24.6	15.3	Karnup Road west / Falls Road east – Baldivis, Serpentine National Park	
Serpentine–Jarrahdale	Serpentine–Keysbrook boundary	29.1	18.1	Kingsbury Drive (Tourist Drive 206) – Karnet, Serpentine Dam	Tourist Drive 206 southern concurrency terminus
Murray	North Dandalup	42.6	26.5	South Street – Nambeelup, Mandurah	Connection to Mandurah and the Kwinana Freeway via Lakes Road.
Murray	North Dandalup	42.8	26.6	Del Park Road – Dwellingup	
Murray	Pinjarra	57.5	35.7	Pinjarra–Williams Road – Dwellingup, Boddington, Williams, Narrogin	Change of street name to George Street
Murray River		57.6	35.8	Pinjarra Traffic Bridge	
Murray	Pinjarra	58.1	36.1	Pinjarra Road – Ravenswood, South Yunderup, Mandurah	Traffic light intersection
Murray	Pinjarra	58.3	36.2	Peel Street northwest / Camp Road southeast	Change of street name to McLarty Road.
Murray	Blythewood	60.7	37.7	Greenlands Road – West Pinjarra, Nirimba	Roundabout, closest direct connection to Forrest Highway. McLarty Road reverts to South Western Highway 1 km further north.
Murray	Blythewood	63.4	39.4	Old Bunbury Road – Herron, Lake Clifton	
Murray	Coolup	70.9	44.1	Murray Street west / Coolup Road East – West Coolup, Meelon	
Waroona	Waroona	82.4	51.2	McDowell Street – Nanga Brook	
Waroona	Waroona	83.2	51.7	Coronation Road west / Thatcher Street East – Lake Clifton, Preston Beach, Nanga Brook	
Harvey	Yarloop	96.7	60.1	Johnston Road – Yarloop, Preston Beach	
Harvey	Cookernup	102	63	Riverdale Road west / Logue Brook Dam Road east – Myalup, Logue Brook	
Harvey River		110	68	Harvey River bridge	
Harvey	Harvey	111	69	Uduc Road west / Weir Road east – Myalup, Quindanning	
Harvey	Brunswick Junction	128	80	Marriott Road – Kemerton	
Harvey	Brunswick Junction	132	82	Beela Road east / Clifton Road west – Beela, Australind	Road changes name to Ommaney Road 1 km before the intersection, and reverts about 1 km afterwards.
Harvey	Roelands	137	85	Coalfields Highway (State Route 107) east / Raymond Road west – Collie, Darkan, Australind	
Collie River		138	86	Collie River bridge	
Bunbury	Waterloo	142– 143	88– 89	Wilman Wadandi Highway north and south (State Route 101) / Waterloo Road southwest – Mandurah, Australind, Capel, Busselton	Modified dogbone interchange favouring Wilman Wadandi: northbound exit ramp looped. Waterloo Road intersects with western roundabout.
Bunbury	Picton	150	93	Willinge Drive – Vittoria, Dardanup, Boyanup	Traffic light intersection. Connection to Dardanup/Boyanup via Boyanup-Picton Road south of the intersection.
Bunbury	Picton-Glen Iris boundary	151	94	Vittoria Road	Roundabout
Preston River		152	94	Preston River bridge	
Bunbury	East Bunbury–Glen Iris boundary	153	95	Robertson Drive (National Route 1 / State Route 10) north and south / Picton Road west – Bunbury	Traffic light intersection; State Route 20 southern terminus.
1.000 mi = 1.609 km; 1.000 km = 0.621 mi: Concurrency terminus; Route transition

=== Davenport to Walpole ===
LGA	Location	km	mi	Destinations	Notes
Bunbury	Davenport	0	0.0	Robertson Drive (National Route 1 north / State Route 10 south) / Brittain Road west – Bunbury	Traffic light intersection
Bunbury	Davenport	4	2.5	Hinkler Drive – Bunbury Airport	
Bunbury–Capel boundary	Davenport–North Boyanup boundary	6	3.7	Wilman Wadandi Highway (State Route 101) – Picton, Dardanup, Gelorup	Roundabout intersection
Capel	Boyanup	17	11	Bridge Street – Dardanup, Picton	Connects to Boyanup Picton Road
Capel	Boyanup	18	11	Trigwell Road – Stratham	Connects to Boyanup West Road
Donnybrook–Balingup	Donnybrook	33	21	Marmion Street – Paynedale, Capel	Connects to Goodwood Road
Donnybrook–Balingup	Donnybrook	34	21	Donnybrook–Boyup Brook Road – Mumballup, Boyup Brook	
Donnybrook–Balingup	Balingup	64	40	Brockman Street (Tourist Drive 251) – Southampton, Nannup	Blackwood River Tourist Drive
Bridgetown–Greenbushes	Greenbushes–North Greenbushes boundary	72	45	Greenbushes–Grimwade Road – North Greenbushes, Grimwade	
Bridgetown–Greenbushes	Greenbushes–North Greenbushes boundary	74	46	Stanifer Street – Greenbushes, Greenbushes mine	
Bridgetown–Greenbushes	Bridgetown	90	56	Steere Street east – Boyup Brook / Henry Street west	Connection to Bridgetown Boyup Brook Road. Note a street name change to Hampton Street
Bridgetown–Greenbushes	Bridgetown	91	57	Brockman Highway (Tourist Drive 251) – Nannup, Augusta	Blackwood River Tourist Drive
Manjimup	Manjimup	125	78	Graphite Road west / Perup Road east – Nannup, Balbarrup	
Manjimup	Manjimup	127	79	Muir Highway (State Route 102) east / Pritchard Street west – Rocky Gully, Mount Barker	
Manjimup	Jardee–Diamond Tree–Middlesex tripoint	135	84	Eastbourne Road (Tourist Drive 259) – Pemberton	Karri Tourist Drive
Manjimup	Diamond Tree–Middlesex boundary	141	88	Vasse Highway – Pemberton	
Manjimup	Quinninup–Crowea boundary	155	96	Wheatley Coast Road (Tourist Drive 259) – Northcliffe, Upper Warren	Karri Tourist Drive
Manjimup	Shannon–Lake Muir boundary	176	109	Middleton Road (State Route 10) – Northcliffe, Augusta	
Manjimup	Walpole	244	152	North Walpole Road – North Walpole	
Manjimup	Walpole	245	152	Vista Street	Southern terminus. Continues as South Coast Highway (National Route 1) eastwards.
1.000 mi = 1.609 km; 1.000 km = 0.621 mi: Concurrency terminus; Route transition

== See also ==
- Highways in Australia
- List of highways in Western Australia
