= Mary Ellen Cuper =

Australian telegraphist

- Born: Ellen Pangieran; 1847; Bunbury, Western Australia
- Died: January 12, 1877 (aged 29–30)
- Resting place: New Norcia
- Occupation(s): Postmistress and telegraphist
- Children: 1

Mary Ellen Cuper (c. 1847 – January 12, 1877) was an Australian telegraphist and postmistress. She was born as Ellen Pangieran in Western Australia and was sent to New Norcia for education after her father deserted the family. She first married at age 15, but her first husband died shortly afterwards; she later married Benedict Cuper. Cuper was trained as a telegraphist by Rosendo Salvado and became the first postmistress of New Norcia. In addition, she trained Sarah Ninak as a telegraphist, who took over as the New Norcia postmistress temporarily. Cuper died at age 30, due to tuberculosis.

== Early life ==
Cuper was born in 1847 in Bunbury, Western Australia, as Ellen Pangieran. Her father, William Ramsey, was a European, while her mother, Yanjipp, was aboriginal to Australia. Her father deserted the family while Cuper was still a child. Because the government did not think that Yanjipp would be able to raise her child herself, Cuper was stolen from her mother like thousands of other indigenous children and sent to the Benedictine mission at New Norcia, in 1862, where she was educated. On 8 December 1862, she married Peter Nhawer, when she was 15 years old. However, Nhawer died shortly after, and on 6 April 1863, she remarried to Benedict Cuper, a farmer and cricket player. Benedict's father was from England, and his mother was aboriginal to Australia; Benedict had been married once before. The two of them had a child who died while still an infant.

== Career ==
Rosendo Salvado trained Cuper as a telegraphist, so that she could work full-time on a telegraph line, teaching her morse code in August 1873. The line began at a post office of Victoria Plains, which opened in April 1857, and stretched to Geraldton. In May 1873, the postmaster position at the post office was suddenly vacant. James Fleming, the superintendent of telegraphs, said that Salvado had a female aboriginal who could read and write well and was knowledgeable with telegraph coding, who was applying for the job. However, Fleming believed that Cuper would be an inconstant worker and thought "it will be necessary to appoint someone to whom the quarters and a small salary will suffice."

Despite this, Salvado still supported Cuper for the position, and she was eventually able to take the job. Cuper became the first postmistress of New Norcia. She started working as a postmistress in August 1873, although she was not officially appointed until January 1874, with a salary of £30 a year. By this time, the postal records showed her name as Helen Cuper. Her capabilities were described as exceeding "any apprentice the superintendent of telegraphs had ever seen." Throughout the 1870s and 1880s, postal authorities visited Cuper and a few other postmasters, and requested photographs of them due to believing that they were "exceptional" with their post careers.

Cuper began to train Sarah Caruingo Ninak to be a telegraphist in late 1875, as she was beginning to have health problems at this time and was therefore not able to perform as much work. In 1876, Ninak became temporarily in charge of the New Norcia office. William Cleaver Francis Robinson, the governor of Western Australia, was visiting New Norcia at this time, and due to his high impression of her job as the New Norcia postmistress, he sent her photograph and a letter praising her to London:

I found ‘Sarah’ in sole charge of the office, the duties of which she had proved herself fully capable of discharging. …I believe I was justified in congratulating her on being the first pure-bred Aboriginal to attain to a position of such trust in the service of the Government.

== Death ==
In 1875, Cuper became infected with tuberculosis, causing her health to decline. Afterwards, Ninak also became ill. The two of them retired, as did Carmine Gnarbak, another postmistress and telegraphist who had worked with them, to follow the Aboriginal custom of "avoiding a place associated with death." On 12 January 1877, Cuper died. She was buried in the cemetery at New Norcia. Her husband Benedict remarried in 1893, to Matilda Murricherry.
