= Eaton, Western Australia =

Eaton
- Suburb
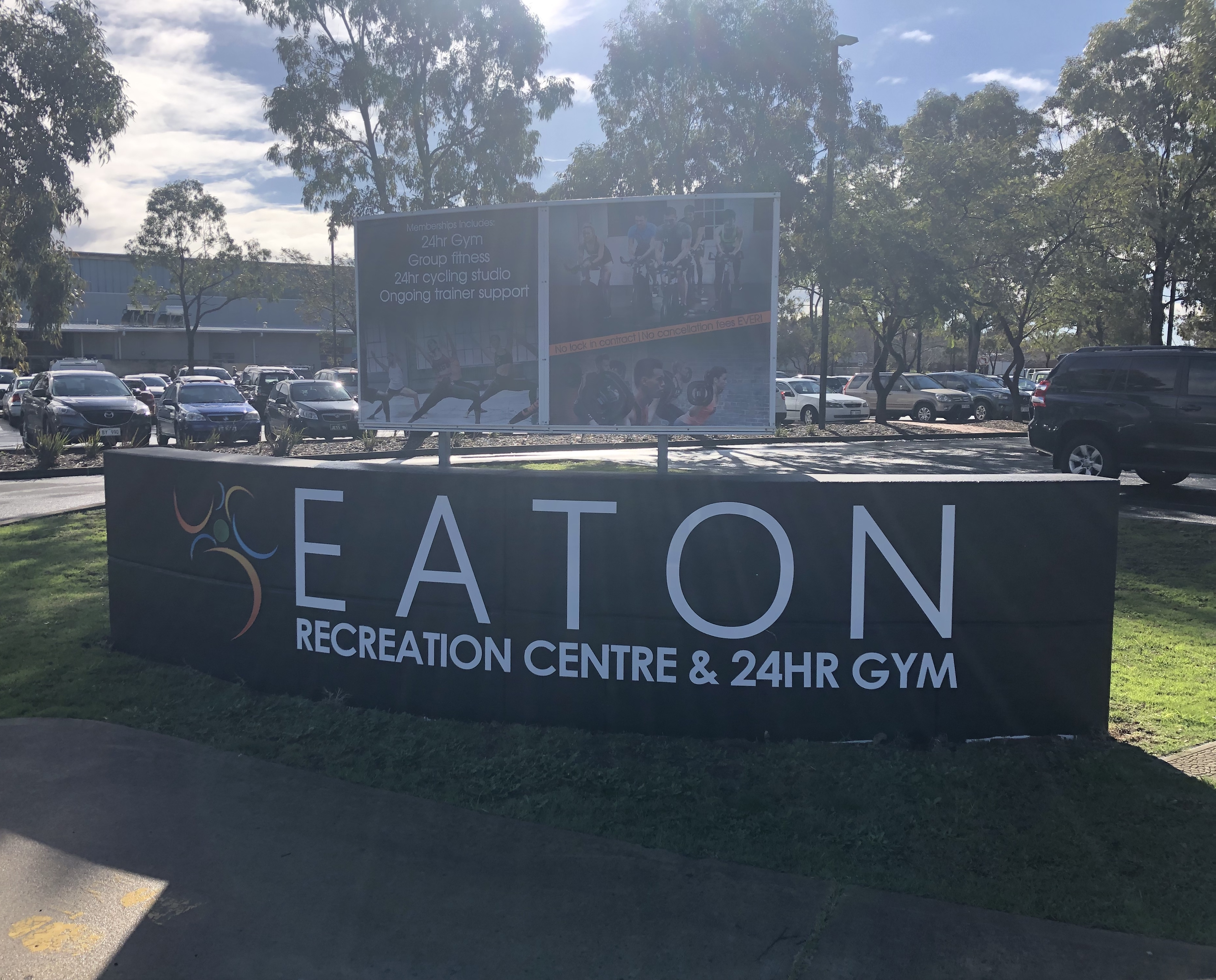

- Interactive map of Eaton
- Coordinates: 33°18′50″S 115°42′43″E
- Country: Australia
- State: Western Australia
- LGA: Shire of Dardanup
- Location: 7 km (4.3 mi) from Bunbury

Government
  - State electorate: Collie-Preston
  - Federal division: Forrest

Area
  - Total: 6.5 km^{2} (2.5 sq mi)

Population
  - Total: 8,669 (SAL 2021)
- Postcode: 6232
Suburbs around Eaton
Australind	Australind	Millbridge
Pelican Point	Eaton	Waterloo
Picton	Picton East	Waterloo

Eaton is a locality in the Shire of Dardanup in Western Australia. It is situated on the south bank of the Collie River, approximately 7 kilometres (4.3 mi) from the city of Bunbury. According to the 2021 census, Eaton had a population of 8,669 residents.

The offices for the Shire are located within the suburb. Eaton contains a state high school, Eaton Community College, and two state primary schools, Eaton and Glen Huon. The suburb also contains a shopping centre called Eaton Fair, as well as a sporting complex led by Eaton Recreation Centre.
