= Crooked Brook, Western Australia =

Locality in the Shire of Dardanup, Western Australia

Crooked Brook
- other
- Coordinates: 33.47°S 115.81°E
- Country: Australia
- State: Western Australia
- LGA: Shire of Dardanup
- Location: 168 km (104 mi) from Perth; 25 km (16 mi) from Bunbury; 10 km (6.2 mi) from Dardanup

Government
  - State electorate: Collie-Preston
  - Federal division: Forrest

Area
  - Total: 105.6 km^{2} (40.8 sq mi)

Population
  - Total: 272 (SAL 2021)
- Postcode: 6236
Localities around Crooked Brook
North Boyanup	Dardanup	Ferguson
Boyanup	Crooked Brook	Wellington Forest
Argyle	Donnybrook	Beelerup

Crooked Brook is a rural locality of the Shire of Dardanup in the South West region of Western Australia.

Crooked Brook is located on the traditional land of the Noongar people.
