= North Boyanup, Western Australia =

Locality in the Shire of Capel, Western Australia

North Boyanup
- Suburb
- Coordinates: 33.43°S 115.69°E
- Country: Australia
- State: Western Australia
- LGA(s): Shire of Capel
- Location: 177 km (110 mi) from Perth; 13 km (8.1 mi) from Bunbury; 24 km (15 mi) from Capel

Government
  - State electorate(s): Collie-Preston
  - Federal division(s): Forrest

Area
  - Total: 38.3 km^{2} (14.8 sq mi)

Population
  - Total(s): 323 (SAL 2021)
- Postcode: 6237
Suburbs around North Boyanup
College Grove	Davenport	Dardanup West
Gelorup	North Boyanup	Crooked Brook
Boyanup	Boyanup	Boyanup

North Boyanup is a rural locality of the Shire of Capel in the South West region of Western Australia, located along the South Western Highway.

The Shire of Capel and the locality of North Boyanup are located on the traditional land of the Wardandi (also spelled Wadandi) people of the Noongar nation.
