= Davenport, Western Australia =

Suburb of Bunbury, Western Australia

Davenport
- Suburb
- Coordinates: 33.37°S 115.68°E
- Country: Australia
- State: Western Australia
- LGA: City of Bunbury
- Location: 172 km (107 mi) from Perth; 6 km (3.7 mi) from Bunbury

Government
  - State electorate: Bunbury
  - Federal division: Forrest

Area
  - Total: 11.7 km^{2} (4.5 sq mi)

Population
  - Total: 8 (SAL 2021)
- Postcode: 6230
Suburbs around Davenport
Carey Park	Glen Iris	Picton
College Grove	Davenport	Picton East
North Boyanup	North Boyanup	Dardunup West

Davenport is a suburb of the City of Bunbury in the South West region of Western Australia. It is predominantly commercial in the north-west, with Bunbury Airport located within the suburb, while the remainder is rural.

Davenport is located on the traditional land of the Wardandi people of the Noongar nation.
