= Dardanup West, Western Australia =

Locality in the Shire of Dardanup, Western Australia

Dardanup West
- other
- Coordinates: 33.40°S 115.72°E
- Country: Australia
- State: Western Australia
- LGA: Shire of Dardanup
- Location: 161 km (100 mi) from Perth; 12 km (7.5 mi) from Bunbury; 2 km (1.2 mi) from Dardanup

Government
  - State electorate: Collie-Preston
  - Federal division: Forrest

Area
  - Total: 18.2 km^{2} (7.0 sq mi)

Population
  - Total: 669 (SAL 2021)
- Postcode: 6236
Localities around Dardanup West
Picton East	Picton East	Paradise
North Boyanup	Dardanup West	Dardanup
North Boyanup	Crooked Brook	Crooked Brook

Dardanup West is a rural locality of the Shire of Dardanup in the South West region of Western Australia.

Dardanup West is located on the traditional land of the Noongar people. The word "Dardanup" is believed to be a variation of the Aboriginal word Dudingup, the meaning of which is unknown.

The locality is home to the heritage listed Dardanup Park Homestead, which dates back to 1852. Originally built by Thomas Little, a pioneer settler, it was later home to Harry Venn, Western Australian Minister for Railways.
