= Ferguson River (Western Australia) =

River in Western Australia

Coordinates: 33°24′3″S 115°48′8″E

Location
- Country: Australia

Physical characteristics
- Source
  - location: Darling Range
  - elevation: 162 m (531 ft)
- Mouth
  - location: Preston River
- Length: 36 km (22 mi)

Ferguson River is a river in the South West region of Western Australia.

The river has a total length of 36 kilometres (22 mi) and rises in the Darling Range below Wellington Mill then flows in a north-westerly direction until discharging into the Preston River at Picton near Bunbury. The only tributary of the river is Hough Brook.

The river was named after John Ferguson by the surveyor H.M. Ommanney. Ferguson owned a property along the river that Ommanney was surveying at the time.

The Ferguson Valley is a tourist area in the Shire of Dardanup with several wineries, restaurants, boutique breweries and art galleries to be found amongst the picturesque rolling hills. The area is also still utilised for grazing of dairy cattle.
