= Paradise, Western Australia =

Locality in the Shire of Dardanup, Western Australia

Paradise
- other
- Coordinates: 33.38°S 115.77°E
- Country: Australia
- State: Western Australia
- LGA: Shire of Dardanup
- Location: 158 km (98 mi) from Perth; 14 km (8.7 mi) from Bunbury; 2 km (1.2 mi) from Dardanup

Government
  - State electorate: Collie-Preston
  - Federal division: Forrest

Area
  - Total: 24.3 km^{2} (9.4 sq mi)

Population
  - Total: 141 (SAL 2021)
- Postcode: 6236
Localities around Paradise
| Picton East | Waterloo | Henty |
| Dardanup West | Paradise | Henty |
| Dardanup West | Dardanup | Dardanup |

Paradise is a rural locality of the Shire of Dardanup in the South West region of Western Australia.

Paradise is located on the traditional land of the Noongar people.

== Heritage sites ==
The locality is home to four heritage listed sites: the Taunton Vale Homestead, the Princep Park Homestead as well as two heritage listed houses.
