= Waterloo, Western Australia =

Waterloo
- Town
- Coordinates: 33.33°S 115.76°E
- Country: Australia
- State: Western Australia
- LGA(s): Shire of Dardanup
- Location: 162 km (101 mi) south of Perth; 8 km (5.0 mi) north of Dardanup; 12 km (7.5 mi) east of Bunbury

Government
  - State electorate(s): Collie-Preston
  - Federal division(s): Forrest

Area
  - Total: 31.6 km^{2} (12.2 sq mi)
- Elevation: 19 m (62 ft)

Population
  - Total(s): 144 (SAL 2021)
- Postcode: 6228
Localities around Waterloo
Millbridge	Roelands	Roelands
Picton East	Waterloo	Burekup
Picton East	Paradise	Henty

Waterloo is a small town in the South West region of Western Australia, located on the South Western Highway between Bunbury and Brunswick Junction.

The population of the town was 41 (23 males and 18 females) in 1898.

In December 2013 the Western Australian Planning Commission's (WAPC's) Greater Bunbury Strategy identified an urban expansion area in the north of Waterloo. In April 2016 the WAPC released a draft Wanju District Structure Plan for the 1,245 ha (4.81 sq mi) urban expansion area, showing the broad layout of the urban expansion area and a conceptual fly-through video. "Wanju" means "welcome" in the Noongar language. The Wanju District Structure Plan will provide an estimated 20,000 dwellings and 4,000 jobs.
