= Roelands, Western Australia =

Roelands
- Town
- Interactive map of Roelands
- Coordinates: 33°17′31″S 115°49′42″E
- Country: Australia
- State: Western Australia
- LGA: Shire of Harvey
- Location: 165 km (103 mi) from Perth; 26 km (16 mi) from Harvey; 23 km (14 mi) from Bunbury
- Established: 1890s

Government
  - State electorate: Collie-Preston
  - Federal division: Forrest

Area
  - Total: 95 km^{2} (37 sq mi)

Population
  - Total: 938 (SAL 2021)
- Postcode: 6226

Roelands is a town in the South West region of Western Australia on the South Western Highway, between Brunswick Junction and Bunbury. At the 2011 census, Roelands had a population of 620.

== History ==
The name Roelands relates to a property of the same name granted to the Swan River Colony's first Surveyor General in 1830, John Septimus Roe, as part of the 20 square kilometres (5,000 acres) to which he was entitled for bringing considerable capital to the colony. Roe spoke highly of the area and its potential value for agriculture. The first pastoralists and shepherds arrived in the area in the 1880s seeking improved pasture for their stock.

In 1893 a railway station was built here to service the railway line from Pinjarra to Picton Junction, and was initially called Collie Siding after the nearby Collie River. However, after the gazettal of nearby Collie in December 1897, and much public argument in the region, Collie Siding was renamed to Roelands. The first big quantity of coal from Collie was carted by road to the Collie Siding and then railed to Perth. The demand on the area from the timber and coal business led to the construction of the Colliefields Hotel.

A school was established in 1903, and in 1916 a private subdivision was undertaken surrounding the school site. In 1963 the subdivision was gazetted a townsite at the request of the Shire of Harvey.

From the 1940s until the 1970s the Roelands Farm and Mission housed Aboriginal children whose families could not look after them, and also children who had been removed from their families by the government. Harry Lupton (United Aborigines Mission) and Ken Cross started it. UAM and later Churches of Christ missionaries served here. An estimated 500 children stayed here during the life of the mission, some of whom spent 16 years of their life there. The land was purchased for A$1.92 million in August 2004 by the Indigenous Land Corporation.

== Present day ==
Roelands is a small township nestled at the foothills of the Darling Range, and is the meeting point of the South Western Highway (Highway 20) between Bunbury and Perth via Pinjarra, and the Coalfields Highway (Route 107) to Collie, Darkan and Arthur River. Roelands has a small school called Hope Christian College located on Government Road, established in 1999, with approximately 500 students currently enrolled.
