= Pelican Point, Western Australia =

Pelican Point
- Suburb
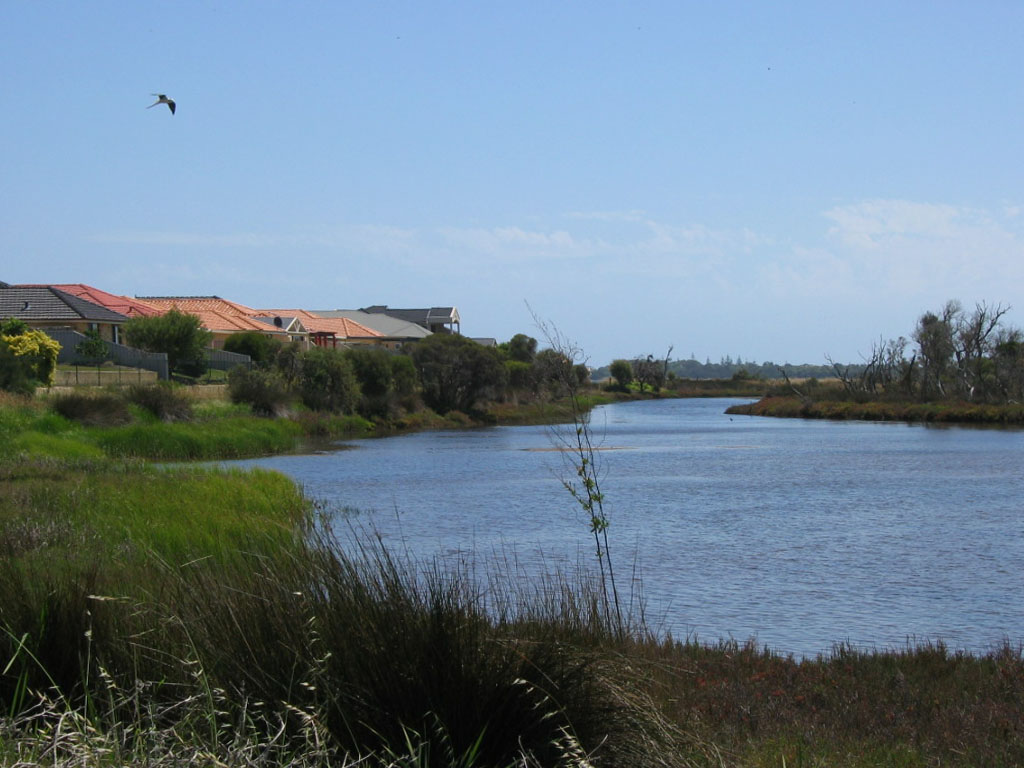

- Interactive map of Pelican Point
- Coordinates: 33°19′16″S 115°41′31″E
- Country: Australia
- State: Western Australia
- City: Bunbury
- LGA: City of Bunbury
- Location: 6 km (3.7 mi) from Bunbury
- Established: 1997

Government
  - State electorate: Bunbury
  - Federal division: Forrest

Area
  - Total: 2.2 km^{2} (0.85 sq mi)

Population
  - Total: 929 (SAL 2021)
- Postcode: 6230
Suburbs around Pelican Point
	Australind
Vittoria	Pelican Point	Eaton
	Glen Iris	Picton

Pelican Point is a northeastern suburb of Bunbury, Western Australia, that is six kilometres from the centre of Bunbury and adjoins the suburb of Eaton. It is within the City of Bunbury local government area.

== History ==
The suburb was developed from 1997 onwards by the City of Bunbury. The Sanctuary Golf Resort was designed in 1994 by Michael Coate, and residential estates opened around it and along the surrounding waterways and wetlands. The median house price in Pelican Point is $637,500, which is significantly higher than the neighbouring urban suburbs of Eaton ($355,000), Australind ($389,000) and Glen Iris ($328,250).

== Geography ==
The suburb of Pelican Point is bounded to the west and south by the Bunbury port railway, to the east by Old Coast Road, the Leschenault Estuary to the north and north west, and the mouth the Collie River. Only the north-eastern third is available for residential development.

== Facilities ==
Pelican Point's main attraction is the Sanctuary Golf Resort, open since 1999, with an All Seasons hotel and 18-hole golf course on site. The resort hosts a range of events. Several B&Bs, foreshore parks and a boat ramp are also located within the suburb. Scenic dual use trails for walking and biking run along the northern and western edges of Pelican Point, overlooking the estuary.

A neighbourhood shopping centre exists at the intersection of Estuary Drive and Old Coast Road. Eaton Central shopping centre meets daily shopping needs, while Bunbury Forum to the south-west provides other services. Near the suburb's eastern boundary are Eaton Community Centre and Eaton Primary School.

== Transport ==
Pelican Point is served by the 601 (Eaton) and 701 (Australind) routes from Bunbury's central bus station, with a journey time of approximately 15 minutes. The routes are operated by Bunbury City Transit for the Public Transport Authority.
