= Wellington Forest, Western Australia =

Locality in the Shire of Dardanup, Western Australia

Wellington Forest
- other
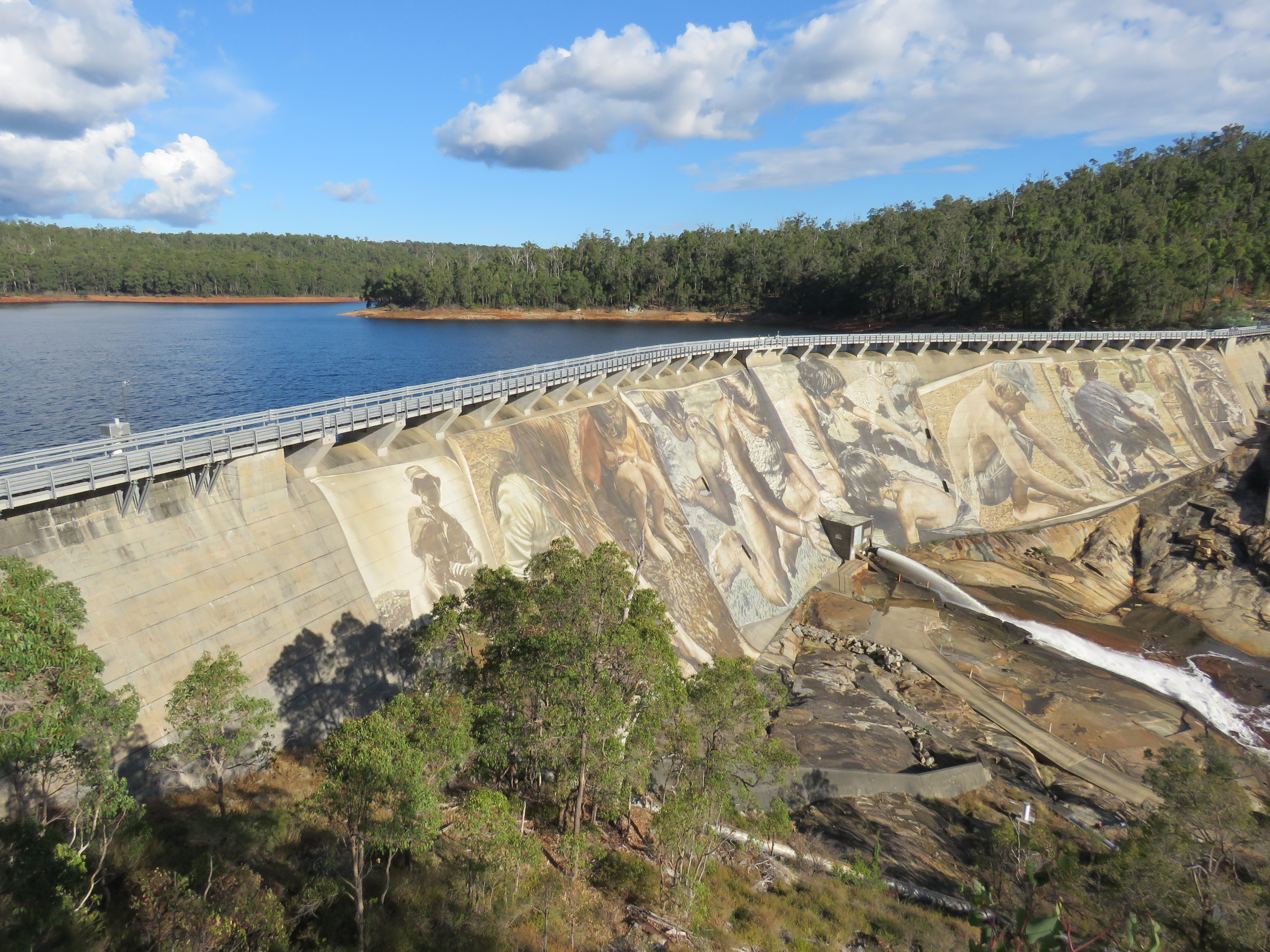
- The Wellington Dam wall in April 2022
- Coordinates: 33.43°S 115.96°E
- Country: Australia
- State: Western Australia
- LGA: Shire of Dardanup
- Location: 167 km (104 mi) from Perth; 36 km (22 mi) from Bunbury; 22 km (14 mi) from Dardanup

Government
  - State electorate: Collie-Preston
  - Federal division: Forrest

Area
  - Total: 186 km^{2} (72 sq mi)

Population
  - Total: 13 (SAL 2021)
- Postcode: 6236
Localities around Wellington Forest
Burekup	Worsley	Mungalup
Ferguson	Wellington Forest	Mungalup
Crooked Brook	Lowden	Yabberup

Wellington Forest is a forested locality of the Shire of Dardanup in the South West region of Western Australia. Wellington National Park is predominantly located within the locality.

Wellington Forest is located on the traditional land of the Noongar people.

The locality is home to the southern half of the state heritage listed Wellington Dam, which was constructed in 1933, while the northern half is located in the locality of Worsley in the Shire of Collie.
