= Shire of Dardanup =

Coordinates: 33°18′50″S 115°42′43″E

- Local government area
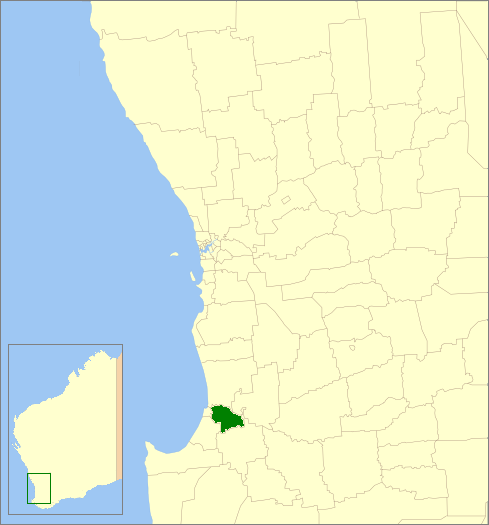
- Location in Western Australia

- Interactive map of Shire of Dardanup
- Country: Australia
- State: Western Australia
- Region: South West
- Established: 1894
- Council seat: Eaton

Government
  - Shire President: Tyrell Gardiner
  - State electorate: Collie-Preston
  - Federal division: Forrest

Area
  - Total: 526.6 km^{2} (203.3 sq mi)

Population
  - Total: 14,686 (LGA 2021)
- Website: Shire of Dardanup
LGAs around Shire of Dardanup
Harvey	Harvey	Collie
Bunbury	Shire of Dardanup	Collie
Capel	Donnybrook- Balingup	Donnybrook- Balingup

The Shire of Dardanup is a local government area in the South West region of Western Australia, immediately to the east and southeast of the City of Bunbury and about 180 kilometres (112 mi) south of the state capital, Perth. The Shire covers an area of 526.6 square kilometres (203.3 sq mi), and its seat of government is in Eaton in Bunbury's eastern suburbs.

== History ==
The Dardanup Road District was gazetted on 14 December 1894. On 1 July 1961, it became a shire following the passage of the Local Government Act 1960, which reformed all remaining road districts into shires.

== Wards ==
The Shire is no longer divided into wards and the nine councillors sit at large.

== Towns and localities ==
The towns and localities of the Shire of Dardanup with population and size figures based on the most recent Australian census:

Locality	Population	Area	Map
Burekup	788 (SAL 2021)	40.5 km^{2} (15.6 sq mi)	
Crooked Brook	272 (SAL 2021)	105.6 km^{2} (40.8 sq mi)	
Dardanup	588 (SAL 2021)	7 km^{2} (2.7 sq mi)	
Dardanup West	669 (SAL 2021)	18.2 km^{2} (7.0 sq mi)	
Eaton	8,669 (SAL 2021)	6.5 km^{2} (2.5 sq mi)	
Ferguson	233 (SAL 2021)	41.4 km^{2} (16.0 sq mi)	
Henty	142 (SAL 2021)	39.5 km^{2} (15.3 sq mi)	
Millbridge	2,736 (SAL 2021)	1.9 km^{2} (0.73 sq mi)	
Paradise	141 (SAL 2021)	24.3 km^{2} (9.4 sq mi)	
Picton East	141 (SAL 2021)	12.5 km^{2} (4.8 sq mi)	
Waterloo	144 (SAL 2021)	31.6 km^{2} (12.2 sq mi)	
Wellington Forest	13 (SAL 2021)	186 km^{2} (72 sq mi)	
Wellington Mill	151 (SAL 2021)	13.4 km^{2} (5.2 sq mi)	

== Notable councillors ==
- Les Craig, Dardanup Road Board member 1928–1951, chairman 1947–1951; also a state MP

== Heritage-listed places ==
As of 2023, 60 places are heritage-listed in the Shire of Dardanup, of which four are on the State Register of Heritage Places.
