= Picton, Western Australia =

Suburb of Bunbury, Western Australia

Picton
- Suburb
- Coordinates: 33.35°S 115.69°E
- Country: Australia
- State: Western Australia
- LGA: City of Bunbury
- Location: 170 km (110 mi) from Perth; 7 km (4.3 mi) from Bunbury

Government
  - State electorate: Bunbury
  - Federal division: Forrest

Area
  - Total: 6 km^{2} (2.3 sq mi)

Population
  - Total: 31 (SAL 2021)
- Postcode: 6229
Suburbs around Picton
Pelican Point	Picton East	Picton East
Glen Iris	Picton	Picton East
Davenport	Picton East	Picton East

Picton is a suburb of the City of Bunbury in the South West region of Western Australia. Both the South Western Highway and the South Western Railway bisect the suburb from east to west.

Picton is located on the traditional land of the Wardandi people of the Noongar nation.

The suburb contains a number of heritage-listed sites, among them the state registered St Mark's Anglican Church, the Picton Inn Hotel and the Forrest Homestead. Both the Picton Inn Hotel and the Forrest Homestead date back to around 1850.
