= Dardanup, Western Australia =

Dardanup
- Town
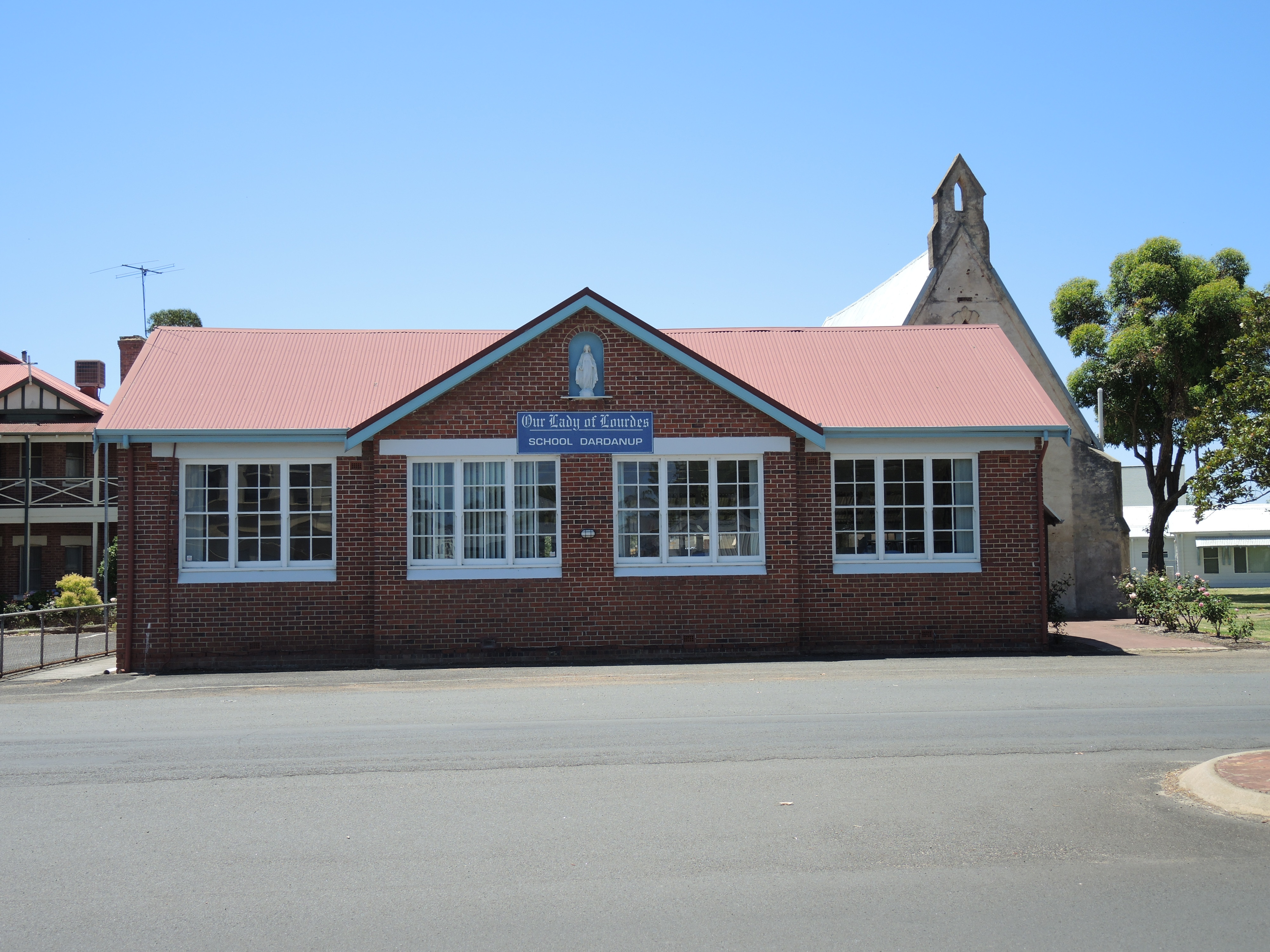
- Our Lady of Lourdes School

- Coordinates: 33°24′S 115°45′E
- Country: Australia
- State: Western Australia
- LGA(s): Shire of Dardanup
- Location: 187 km (116 mi) south of Perth; 10 km (6.2 mi) north of Boyanup; 13 km (8.1 mi) south east of Bunbury
- Established: 1923

Government
  - State electorate(s): Collie-Preston
  - Federal division(s): Forrest

Area
  - Total: 7 km^{2} (2.7 sq mi)
- Elevation: 30 m (98 ft)

Population
  - Total(s): 588 (SAL 2021)
- Postcode: 6236
Localities around Dardanup
Dardanup West	Paradise	Henty
Dardanup West	Dardanup	Ferguson
Crooked Brook	Crooked Brook	Crooked Brook

Dardanup is a small town in the South West region of Western Australia. The town is in the fertile Ferguson valley and is near the Ferguson River.

The first European settlement in the area was in 1852 by Thomas Little, who named his property Dardanup Park. The word "Dardanup" is believed to be a variation of the Aboriginal Australian word Dudingup, the meaning of which is unknown.

Construction of the local agricultural hall commenced in 1893 by J. and H. Gibbs, who had submitted the lowest tender. The hall, constructed of jarrah and weatherboard, was opened in 1894 by H. W. Venn.

The population of the area was 118 (81 males and 37 females) in 1898.

Little later gave land to the Catholic Church and a community was soon established in the locale. The government acquired land in the area in the 1920s and the townsite was gazetted in 1923.

James Mitchell was born to a Dardanup farming family in 1866. He was premier of Western Australia 1919–24 and again 1930–33. He was appointed acting governor and then governor of Western Australia, 1933–51, the only person to be both premier and governor of Western Australia.
