= Bunbury, Western Australia =

City in Western Australia

Bunbury Goomburrup (Noongar)
- City
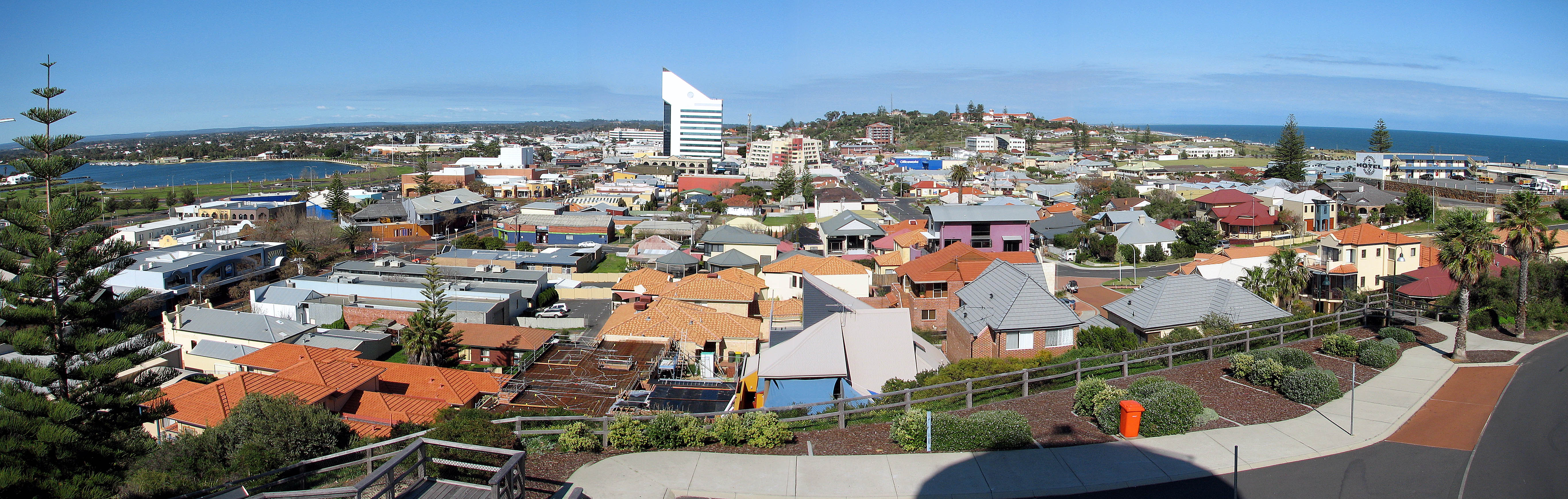
- Panorama of Bunbury from lookout tower

- Coordinates: 33°19′38″S 115°38′13″E
- Country: Australia
- State: Western Australia
- Region: South West
- Location: 175 km (109 mi) SSW of Perth; 108 km (67 mi) S of Mandurah; 52 km (32 mi) NE of Busselton; 47 km (29 mi) SW of Harvey; 39 km (24 mi) NW of Donnybrook
- Established: 1836

Government
  - State electorates: Bunbury; Collie-Preston; Murray-Wellington
  - Federal division: Forrest

Area (2021 urban)
  - Total: 222.8 km^{2} (86.0 sq mi)
- Elevation: 5 m (16 ft)

Population
  - Total: 76,452 (2021) (24th)
  - Density: 343.14/km^{2} (888.73/sq mi)
- Time zone: UTC+08:00 (AWST)
- Postcode: 6230 - 6231

Bunbury (/ˈbʌnbəɹɪ/, BUN-bə-REE; Noongar: Goomburrup) is a coastal city in the Australian state of Western Australia, approximately 175 kilometres (109 mi) south of the state capital, Perth. It is the state's third most populous city after Perth and Mandurah, with a population of approximately 75,000.

Located at the south of the Leschenault Estuary, Bunbury was established in 1836 on the orders of Governor James Stirling, A port was constructed on the existing natural harbour soon after, and eventually became the main port for the wider South West region. Further economic growth was fuelled by completion of the South Western Railway in 1893, which linked Bunbury with Perth.

Greater Bunbury includes four local government areas (the City of Bunbury and the shires of Capel, Dardanup, and Harvey), and extends between Yarloop in the north, Boyanup to the south and Capel to the southwest.

== Toponymy ==
The city was named in honour of the then Lieutenant Henry William St Pierre Bunbury (1812–1875).

The first European to travel to the area overland, Lt. Bunbury carried out explorations there in 1836. He wrote of the locality, "A township has been formed, or at least laid down on the maps, comprising the southern promontory and part of the north beach at the entrance of Port Leschenault Inlet, which ... Governor [Stirling] named "Bunbury" in compliment to me......"

In the Noongar language variety spoken by the area's original inhabitants, the Wardandi people, the name of the area is Goomburrup.

== History ==
=== Pre-European history ===
The Wardandi people are part of the Noongar cultural bloc of Aboriginal Australians who live in the south-west corner of Western Australia. They hunted and fished throughout the Bunbury sub-region prior to the first European settlement in the 1830s.

=== Early colonial period ===
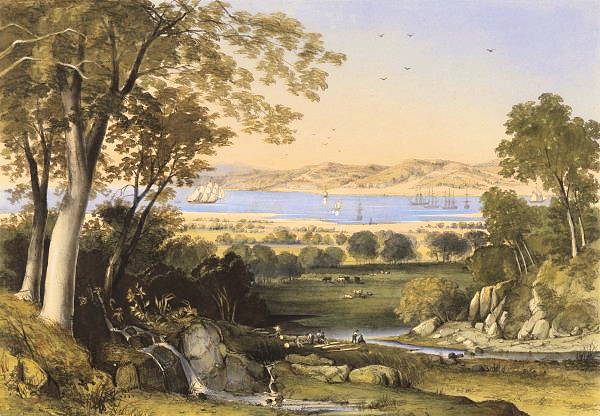
Thomas Colman Dibdin, A view of Koombana Bay, 1840, hand coloured lithograph, National Library of Australia

The first registered sighting of Greater Bunbury was by French explorer Captain Louis de Freycinet from his ship the Casuarina in 1803. He named the area Port Leschenault after the expedition's botanist, Leschenault de La Tour. The bay on Greater Bunbury's western shores was named Geographe after another ship in the fleet.

In 1829, Dr Alexander Collie and Lieutenant Preston explored the area of Bunbury on land. In 1830 Lieutenant Governor Sir James Stirling visited the area and a military post was subsequently established; it only lasted six months. The area was renamed Bunbury by the Governor in recognition of Lt. Bunbury, who developed the very difficult inland route from Pinjarra to Bunbury. Bunbury's first settlers were John and Helen Scott, their sons Robert, William and John Jr, and step-son Daniel McGregor, who arrived in January 1838. Bunbury township was mentioned in the Government Gazette in 1839, but lots in the township were not surveyed until 1841. In March 1841 lots were declared open for selection.

Intermittent bay whaling activity was conducted on the coast from the 1830s through to the 1850s.

By 1842, Bunbury was home to 16 buildings including an inn. Thereafter, a growing port serviced the settlers and the subsequent local industries that developed.

One of the major industries to open up to cement the importance of Bunbury as a port was the timber industry. Timber logs would be floated down the Collie River to be loaded aboard ships headed to the Northern Hemisphere or to South Africa where the hardwood timbers were used for railway sleepers.

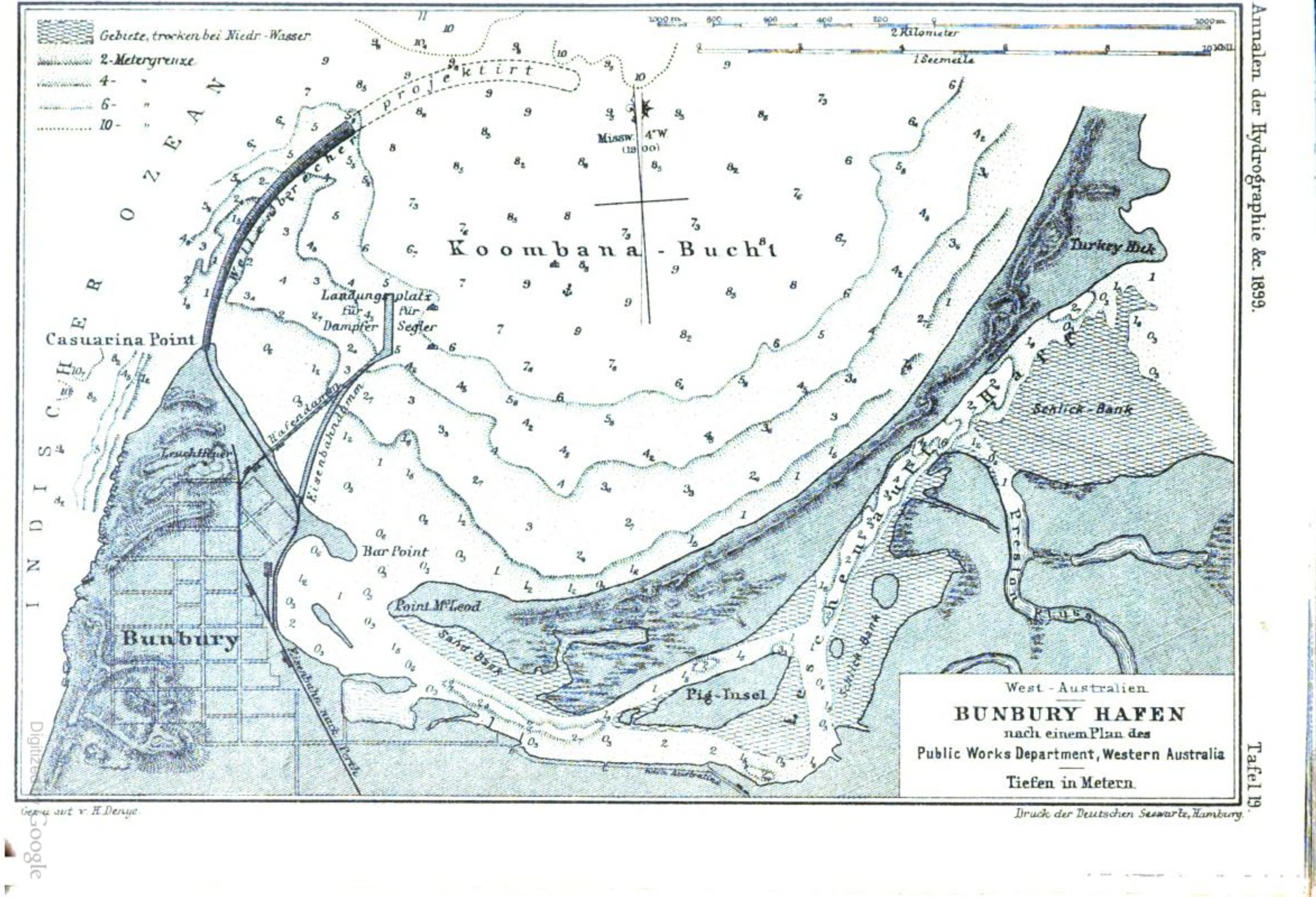
1899 Nautical chart of Bunbury Harbour showing the projected breakwater

In 1884, the Government decided to construct a railway from Bunbury to Boyanup, 16 miles (26 km) long. When the line was completed in 1887, the contractor who had built it obtained a contract to control and work it, which he did with horses. The line was eventually taken over by the Government in 1891 and operated with locomotives. The inconvenience of a railway isolated from the capital gave rise to agitation and in 1893 the South Western Railway was constructed between East Perth and Picton, connecting Greater Bunbury and Perth. The Boyanup line was extended to Donnybrook in the same year. The railways connected the port of Bunbury to the coal and mineral deposits and agricultural areas to the north and east of Greater Bunbury.

The population of the town was 2,970 (1,700 males and 1,270 females) in 1898.

In 1903, a breakwater to further protect the bay and port area was completed.

=== Federation to present day ===
The Old Bunbury railway station served as the terminal for the Australind passenger train between Perth, transporting its first passengers on 24 November 1947. The last train to use the station departed on 28 May 1985 with a new station opening at East Bunbury, 4 kilometres (2 mi) to the south-east the following day. The railway land was then sold and Blair Street realigned.

The Bunbury woodchip bombing in 1976 saw the bombing of Bunbury's export port terminal by environmental activists, in an attempt to disrupt the woodchipping industry in the South West. Two of the three bombs planted failed to explode and the resulting damage to the port was estimated at only $300,000 (equivalent to $2,000,000 in 2022), although shrapnel broke windows in a nearby housing estate and the blast was heard up to 20 kilometres (12 mi) away. There were no injuries although a security guard was held at gunpoint by the bombers.

== Geography ==
Bunbury is situated 175 kilometres (109 mi) south of Perth, at the original mouth of the Preston River and near the mouth of the Collie River at the southern end of the Leschenault Inlet, which opens to Koombana Bay and the larger Geographe Bay which extends southwards to Cape Naturaliste.

=== Climate ===
Bunbury has a Mediterranean climate (Köppen classification Csa) with warm to hot, dry summers and cool, wet winters. Precipitation peaks from the months of May to September.

Climate data for Bunbury, Western Australia (1995–present)
Month	Jan	Feb	Mar	Apr	May	Jun	Jul	Aug	Sep	Oct	Nov	Dec	Year
Record high °C (°F)	40.8 (105.4)	40.0 (104.0)	39.5 (103.1)	34.6 (94.3)	29.2 (84.6)	24.2 (75.6)	22.4 (72.3)	25.3 (77.5)	30.4 (86.7)	32.9 (91.2)	37.5 (99.5)	39.2 (102.6)	40.8 (105.4)
Mean daily maximum °C (°F)	29.9 (85.8)	30.0 (86.0)	27.7 (81.9)	24.2 (75.6)	21.0 (69.8)	18.5 (65.3)	17.3 (63.1)	17.7 (63.9)	18.6 (65.5)	21.1 (70.0)	24.4 (75.9)	27.5 (81.5)	23.2 (73.8)
Daily mean °C (°F)	22.7 (72.9)	23.0 (73.4)	21.1 (70.0)	18.0 (64.4)	15.1 (59.2)	13.3 (55.9)	12.3 (54.1)	12.7 (54.9)	13.6 (56.5)	15.4 (59.7)	18.3 (64.9)	20.6 (69.1)	17.2 (62.9)
Mean daily minimum °C (°F)	15.4 (59.7)	15.9 (60.6)	14.4 (57.9)	11.8 (53.2)	9.2 (48.6)	8.1 (46.6)	7.3 (45.1)	7.6 (45.7)	8.5 (47.3)	9.7 (49.5)	12.1 (53.8)	13.6 (56.5)	11.1 (52.0)
Record low °C (°F)	5.3 (41.5)	6.0 (42.8)	2.2 (36.0)	2.4 (36.3)	−0.1 (31.8)	−3.0 (26.6)	−2.1 (28.2)	0.0 (32.0)	−0.3 (31.5)	0.2 (32.4)	2.1 (35.8)	3.2 (37.8)	−3.0 (26.6)
Average precipitation mm (inches)	10.8 (0.43)	8.8 (0.35)	19.9 (0.78)	38.4 (1.51)	99.5 (3.92)	134.5 (5.30)	145.5 (5.73)	118.2 (4.65)	80.1 (3.15)	36.7 (1.44)	21.5 (0.85)	16.3 (0.64)	728.6 (28.69)
Average precipitation days	1.4	1.1	2.5	5.3	9.1	13	15.1	13.8	11.5	6	3.3	1.9	84
Average afternoon relative humidity (%) (at 15:00)	44	43	46	55	59	64	65	66	64	58	52	48	55
Average dew point °C (°F)	13.1 (55.6)	13.3 (55.9)	12.4 (54.3)	12.2 (54.0)	11.1 (52.0)	10.0 (50.0)	9.2 (48.6)	9.5 (49.1)	9.7 (49.5)	10.5 (50.9)	11.5 (52.7)	12.2 (54.0)	11.2 (52.2)
Source: Bureau of Meteorology

== Demographics ==
In 2007 Bunbury was recognised as Australia's fastest growing city for the 2005/06 period by the Australian Bureau of Statistics.

At the 2021 census the urban population of Bunbury was 76,452. At the 2021 Census the median age was 39. It is estimated that by 2031 the population of the Greater Bunbury region will exceed 100,000 people.

In urban Bunbury at the 2021 census, 74.8% of people were born in Australia. The most common other countries of birth were England 5.5%, New Zealand 3.0%, South Africa 1.9%, the Philippines 1.3% and India 0.8%. 85.7% of people only spoke English at home. Other languages spoken at home included Afrikaans 0.9%, Mandarin 0.7%, Italian 0.6%, Tagalog 0.6%, and Filipino 0.5%.

In the 2021 Census the most common responses for religion in Bunbury were No religion 47.5%, Catholic 17.2%, Anglican 12.3%, Christian, nfd (not further described) 3.3%.

The most common occupations in Bunbury included Technicians and Trades Workers 18.4%, Professionals 16.3%, Labourers 12.6%, Community and Personal Service Workers 12.0%, and Clerical and Administrative Workers 11.4%. In 2021 Bunbury had an unemployment rate of 4.9%.

== Governance ==
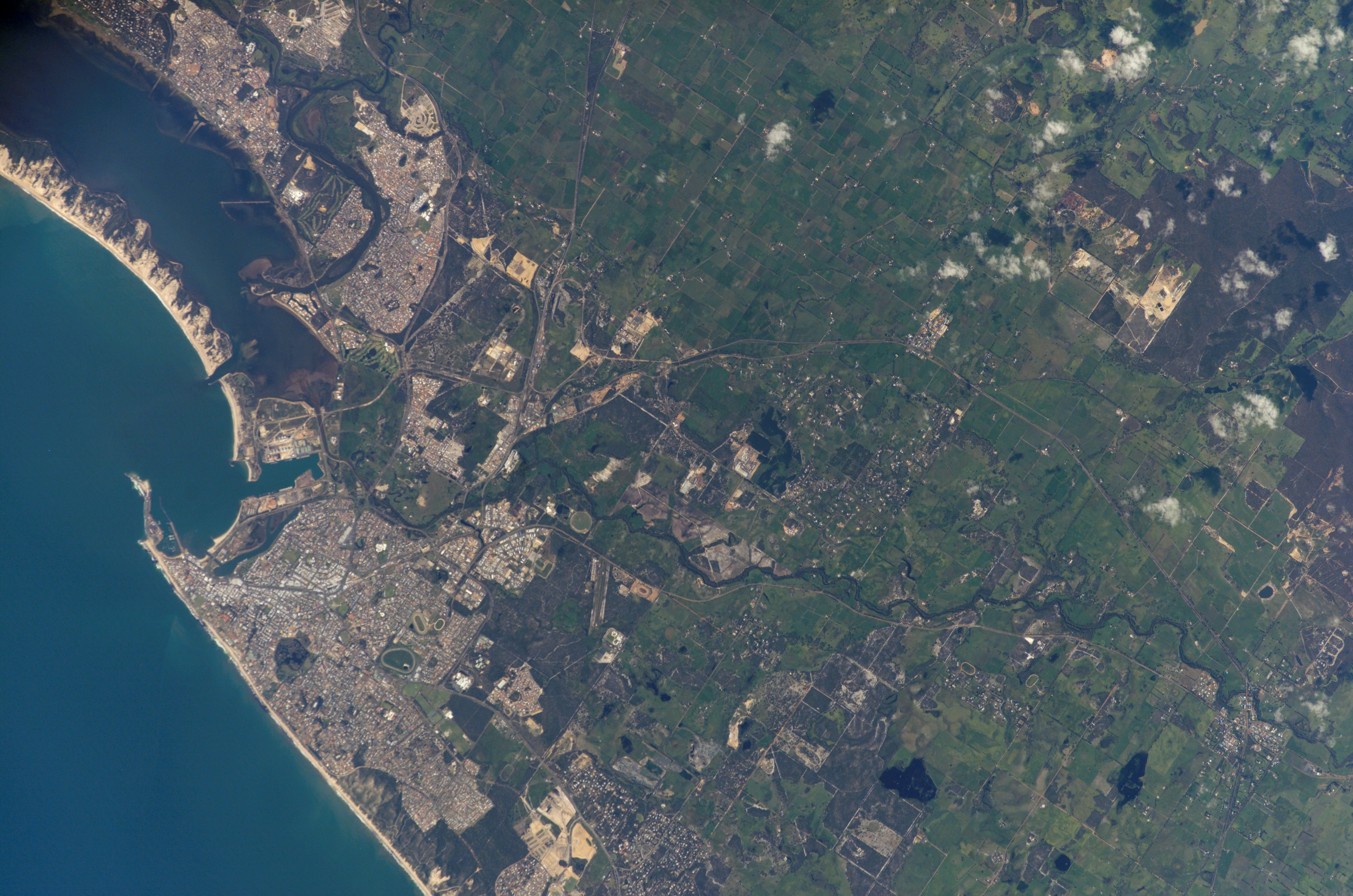
Satellite image of Bunbury and surrounds in October 2007

The Greater Bunbury sub-region comprises the four local government areas of the City of Bunbury, Shire of Capel, Shire of Dardanup and Shire of Harvey. The Greater Bunbury Region Scheme, in operation since November 2007, provides the legal basis for planning in the Greater Bunbury sub-region.

The Greater Bunbury sub-region is administered by State and local governments. There is no sub-region government structure in place for Greater Bunbury.

In December 2013 the Western Australian Planning Commission published the Greater Bunbury Strategy to guide urban, industrial and regional land use planning; and associated infrastructure delivery in the Greater Bunbury sub-region in the short, medium and long terms. The Strategy provides for the growth of Greater Bunbury through infill development of existing urban areas and the development of greenfield land in Waterloo east of Eaton, to provide for a population of 150,000 people beyond 2050.

== Economy ==
The economy of Bunbury is diverse, reflecting the range of heavy and general industries in the locality, mining, agricultural landscapes, services for the growing population, key transport links and the influence of Perth.

The mining and mineral processing sector remains the main economic driver for Bunbury ($2 billion annual turnover). The agriculture sector however, remains vitally important as the value of production is approximately $146 million per annum (2005/06) which equates to approximately 30 per cent of the South West region's agricultural production.

Other industries that are vital to the economic well-being of Greater Bunbury include retail and service industries, building industry, timber production and tourism. Bunbury is home to SIMCOA, which is Australia's only silicon manufacturing company. The Bunbury Port will continue to be the centre of economic activity for the Greater Bunbury sub-region with the flow of goods through it to and from all parts of the world. The proposed expansion of the port, as identified in the Bunbury Port Inner Harbour Structure Plan, will promote further economic growth for the sub-region, and may in time be an economic stimulus for the corporate support and ancillary services associated with port-based industries locating to Bunbury city centre, further strengthening its role as a regional city.

== Education ==
Education is compulsory in Western Australia between the ages of six and seventeen, corresponding to primary and secondary school.

Schools that serve primary school students in the area include Bunbury Primary School, St Mary's Catholic Primary School, Cooinda Primary School, South Bunbury Primary School, Grace Christian School, Bunbury Cathedral Grammar School, Carey Park Primary School, Picton Primary School, and St Joseph's Primary School.

Schools that serve high school students in the area include Bunbury Senior High School, Newton Moore Senior High School, Manea Senior College, College Row School (K–12 education support), Australind Senior High School, Eaton Community College, Dalyellup College, Bunbury Cathedral Grammar School (K–12), Bunbury Catholic College, Grace Christian School, and Our Lady of Mercy College.

=== Tertiary education ===
Tertiary education is available through a number of universities and technical and further education (TAFE) colleges. South Regional TAFE is a State Training Provider providing a range of vocational education with campuses in Bunbury, Albany, and other locations in the southern Western Australia region.

Edith Cowan University also has a campus based in Bunbury.

== Media ==
=== Radio ===
AM band

- SEN Spirit 621 Southwest 621 kHz AM – Sports/Talk/Music format. SEN Spirit 621 Southwest. Part of Sports Entertainment Network. Has local content including local sport and local talk back, and national live sport programming.
- ABC South West WA (6BS): 684 kHz AM – News, talk and sport. Broadcasts breakfast and morning programs from Bunbury.
- Triple M 963 kHz AM – Adult Contemporary for the 40+, with local news and sport. Mostly 60s, 70s, 80s, 90s, 2000s & 2010s (formerly RadioWest, part of the Southern Cross Austereo LocalWorks network)
- Vision Radio Network 1017 AM – Christian praise and worship music and talk
- 6MM 1116 kHz AM – Easy listening and greatest hits format from Mandurah
- ABC Radio National 1224 kHz AM – Speciality talk and music
- ABC News Radio 1152 kHz AM – News, Parliament and sport
- TAB Radio 1404 kHz AM – Racing and sport from Busselton
- 3ABN Christian Radio 1629 kHz AM – Narrowband station from Busselton

FM band

- Western Tourist Radio 87.6 MHz FM – Narrowcast station
- Magic FM 87.8 MHz FM – Narrowcast station
- Faith FM 88.0 MHz FM – Religious station
- 6MM (The Wave) 91.7 MHz FM – Easy listening and greatest hits format from Mandurah
- ABC Classic FM 93.3 MHz FM – Classical music
- Triple J 94.1 MHz FM – Alternative music
- Hit FM 95.7 MHz FM – Hit music (was Hot FM, part of the Southern Cross Austereo Hit radio network)
- Bunbury Community Radio 103.7 MHz FM
- Harvey Community Radio 96.5 MHz FM
- Collie Community Radio 101.3 MHz FM – Community station from Collie
- Coast FM 97.3 MHz FM – Hit music from Mandurah

=== Television ===
Television services available include:

- The Australian Broadcasting Corporation (ABC) – ABC TV, ABC Family/ABC Kids, ABC Entertains, ABC News (digital channels)
- The Special Broadcasting Service (SBS) – SBS TV, SBS2, SBS World Movies, SBS Food, SBS WorldWatch, NITV (digital channels)
- Seven (GWN), an owned and operated and formerly affiliated station of the Seven Network
- WIN Television, an affiliate station of the Nine Network
- West Digital Television, an affiliate station of the Network 10 (provided jointly by Seven Media Group and WIN Television)

The programming schedule is mainly the same as the Seven, Nine and 10 stations in Perth with variations for news bulletins, sport telecasts such as the Australian Football League and National Rugby League, children's and lifestyle programs and infomercials or paid programming.

Seven had its origins in Bunbury as BTW-3 in the late 1960s and then purchased other stations in Kalgoorlie and Geraldton, as well as launching a satellite service in 1986 to form the current network. Seven's studios and offices are based at Roberts Crescent in Bunbury, with its transmitter located at Mount Lennard approximately 25 kilometres (16 mi) to the east. The station produces a nightly 30-minute local news program for regional WA at 5:30 pm on weeknights.

WIN Television maintains a newsroom in the city; however, the station itself is based in Perth. The WIN newsroom provides regional coverage of local news for sister station STW's Nine News bulletins at 6pm each night, which are simulcast on WIN's Nine Western Australia.

On 28 July 2011, new digital television services from GWN and WIN commenced transmission. A new stand alone Network 10 affiliated channel branded as West Digital Television was the first of the new digital only channels to go on-air. The other new digital only channels that are also now available in Bunbury include 7two, 7mate, ishop tv, Racing.com, 10 HD, 10 Drama, 10 Comedy, A placeholder on channel 54 currently showing WIN Television's Australian landmark videos, TVSN, Gold, 9Gem, 9Life and 9Go!.

Subscription Television service Foxtel is available via satellite.

=== Newspapers ===
Bunbury Herald, South Western Times and Bunbury Mail are local newspapers available in Bunbury and surrounding region.

Newspapers from Perth including The West Australian and The Sunday Times are also available, as well as national newspapers such as The Australian and The Australian Financial Review.

== Culture ==
=== Arts and entertainment ===
A number of cultural organisations are located in Bunbury, including:

- Bunbury Regional Art Galleries
- Bunbury Regional Entertainment Centre, with theatre, film and live performance
- Stirling Street Arts Centre

The Bunbury Historical Society is located in the historic King Cottage, which was built around 1880. In 1966 the cottage was purchased by the City of Bunbury and subsequently leased to the Society. The rooms of the cottage are furnished and artifacts displayed to reflect the way of life for a family in Bunbury in the period from the 1880s to the 1920s.

The WA Performing Arts Eisteddfod is held annually at the Bunbury Regional Entertainment Centre.

=== Tourism and recreation ===
There are many tourism and recreational opportunities in Bunbury. Some of the most popular attractions include:

- Dolphin Discovery Centre
- Bunbury Back Beach
- Koombana Bay
- Bunbury Wildlife Park
- Bunbury Farmers Market
- Leschenault Inlet

Bunbury is also very close to the Ferguson Valley.

=== Sport ===
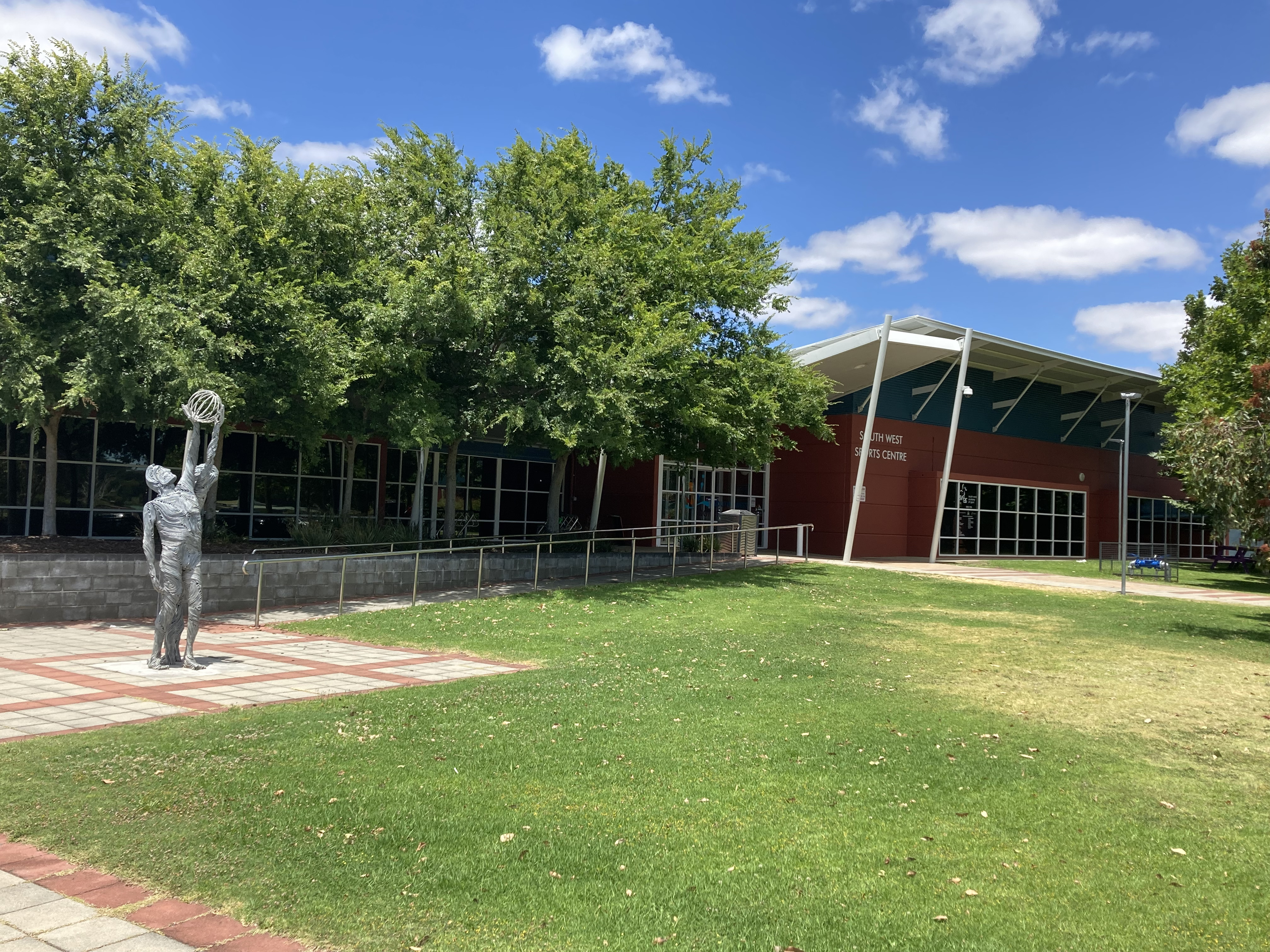
South West Sports Centre, January 2022

A number of Australian rules football clubs are based in Bunbury and play in the South West Football League. A notable stadium is Hands Oval in South Bunbury.

In 2024, it was announced that the North Melbourne Football Club would play one home game a year across a three-year deal in Bunbury. The first match was played on June 8 2025, at Hands Oval, with North Melbourne defeating West Coast by 10 points. It was the first AFL game in Western Australia played outside of the state capital, Perth.

On 5 July 2025, the Matildas played Panama in an international friendlies match at Bunbury's Hands Oval, losing 0–1. It was the first Matildas game played in regional Western Australia, and was one of four international matches held across the state in 2025.

Hay Park Sports Precinct is home to many junior and senior sports codes. Located in the precinct is South West Sports Centre, home to Bunbury Basketball Association.

Bunbury has three clubs in the South West Soccer Association: the Bunbury Dynamos, Bunbury United and Hay Park United.

== Transport ==
Bunbury Airport services Greater Bunbury and is located 8 kilometres (5 mi) southeast of the city centre.

TransWA provides rail and coach services from Bunbury Terminal: Australind train, GS3, SW1 and SW2 to Bunbury and services south from Bunbury and South West Coach Lines provides coach services to and from Bunbury. Bus services in Greater Bunbury are run by TransBunbury with 12 routes.

National Route 1 provides road access to the wider region, and includes:

- Forrest Highway, a dual carriageway road linking north to Perth
- South Western Highway linking to the southeast of Bunbury

Bussell Highway links to Busselton to the west.

The Eelup Rotary, where Forrest Highway terminates in East Bunbury, was named by the Royal Automobile Club of Western Australia as the worst regional intersection in Western Australia and has since undergone a $16m upgrade, which included eight sets of traffic lights (which were switched on in the early hours of Monday 21 May 2012) and extra lanes for each entrance. The government was criticised for breaking a 2008 election promise to build an overpass and underpass.

Bunbury was bypassed by the completion of the Wilman Wadandi Highway in 2024, linking Forrest Highway in Australind to Bussell Highway in Dalyellup.

== Notable people ==
Notable people who come from or have lived in Bunbury include:

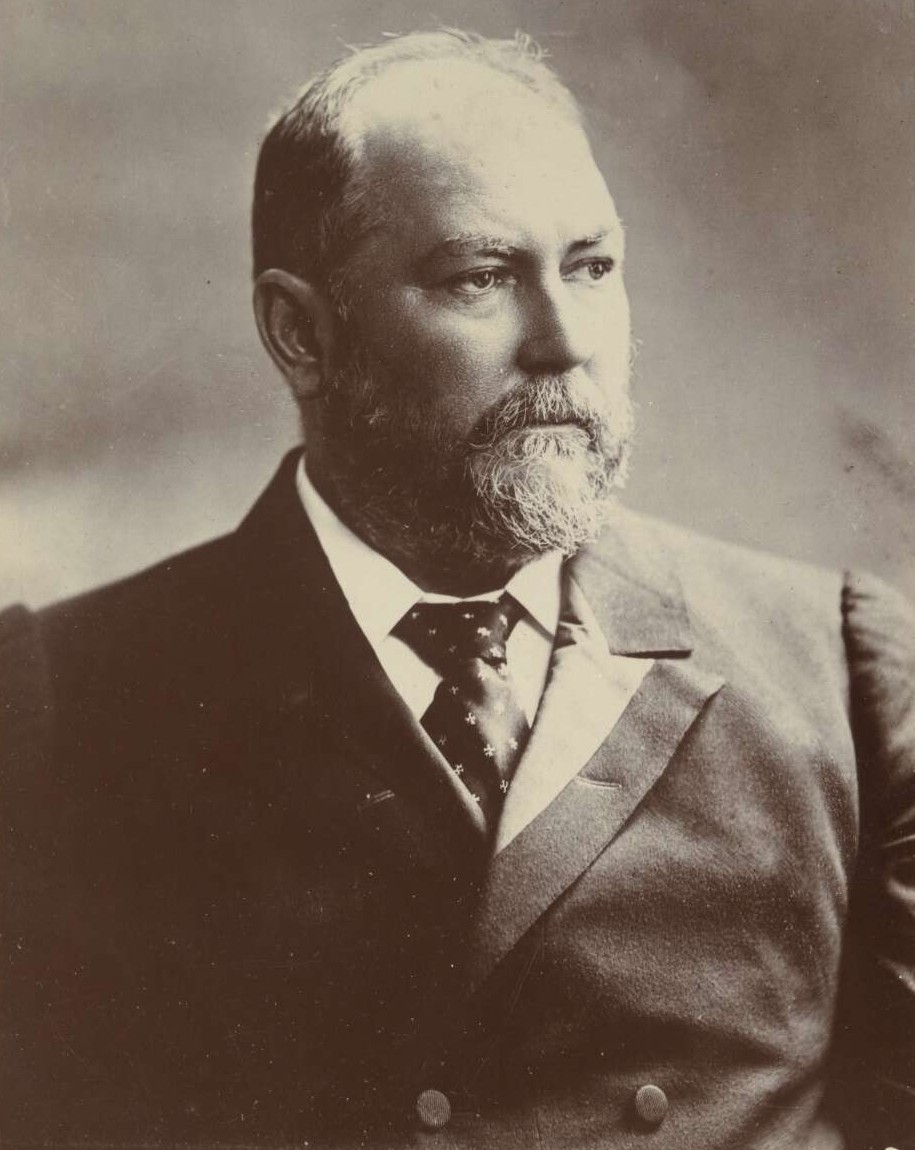
John Forrest was an explorer, surveyor and the first Premier of Western Australia. On 6 February 1918, Forrest was informed that he was to be raised to the British peerage as "Baron Forrest of Bunbury in the Commonwealth of Australia". Despite the announcement, however, no letters patent were issued before his death, so the peerage was not officially created.

- Leon Baker, AFL footballer for Essendon Football Club, played in 1984 and 1985 Premierships
- Paul Barnard, AFL footballer for Essendon Football Club, played in 2000 Premiership
- Natalie Barr, current Sunrise host
- Jamie Bennell, West Coast Eagles AFL player
- Noel Brunning, Seven Regional WA news anchor
- Dianne Buswell, professional dancer, Strictly Come Dancing
- Dorothy Carroll, geologist
- Brett Peter Cowan, convicted murderer and rapist
- Tracey Cross, Paralympic swimmer
- Kevin Cullen, doctor and winemaker
- Mary Ellen Cuper, Aboriginal postmistress and telegraphist
- Courtney Eaton, actress, Mad Max: Fury Road
- Troy Elder, field hockey player
- Alexander Forrest, explorer, politician and investor
- John Forrest, First Premier of Western Australia and cabinet minister in Australia's first parliament
- Jennifer Fowler, composer
- Cameron Gliddon, Cairns Taipans NBL player
- Murray Goodwin, Zimbabwe, Western Australia and Sussex cricketer
- Alexandra Hagan, Olympic rower in Australian Women's Eight at the 2012 London and 2016 Rio de Janeiro Olympic games
- Ben Howlett, Essendon Football Club AFL player
- Ethan Hughes, former AFL player
- Adam Hunter, West Coast Eagles ex-AFL player
- Neville Jetta, Melbourne Football Club AFL player
- Damian Lane, jockey
- Bob Maumill, 882 6PR radio presenter
- Newton Moore, Mayor of Bunbury, Minister for Lands and Agriculture, 8th Premier of Western Australia, Major General (WWI), member of the House of Commons of the United Kingdom
- John Boyle O'Reilly, Irish-born poet, sent to Bunbury in February, 1868 as a convict, escaped on an American whaling ship in 1869.
- Aristos Papandroulakis, television, Surprise Chef
- Kyle Reimers, Essendon Football Club ex-AFL player
- Josh Risdon, Soccer player for Western Sydney Wanderers FC in the A-League and Australia national soccer team
- Edwin Rose, pastoralist president, Royal Agricultural Society of WA
- Kim Salmon, musician
- Barry Shepherd, cricketer
- Richard Adolphus Sholl, Member of the WA Legislative Council 1886–90, member of Legislative Assembly 1890–97
- Robert Frederick Sholl, Western Australian representative at the Australasian Federal Convention 1897
- Nicole Trunfio, model
- Bruce Wallrodt, Paralympic athlete
- Shani Waugh, professional golfer
- Mark Worthington, Cairns Taipans NBL player, 2008 and 2012 Olympian

== See also ==
- List of Bunbury suburbs
