= Harvey High School =

Harvey High School may refer to:

- Harvey High School, in Harvey Station, New Brunswick
- Thomas W. Harvey High School, in Painesville, Ohio
- Harvey Milk High School, in East Village, Manhattan
- Harvey Senior High School, in Harvey, Western Australia
