= Harvey, Western Australia =

Harvey
- Town
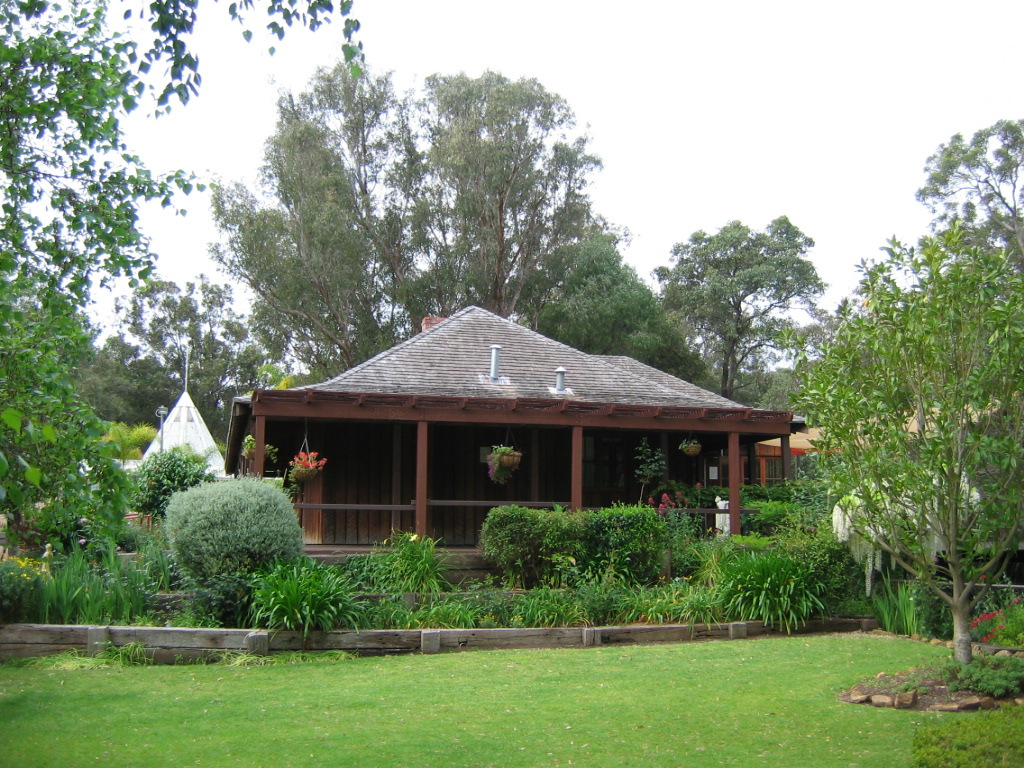
- Stirling Cottage in Harvey, 2006

- Interactive map of Harvey
- Coordinates: 33.08°S 115.89°E
- Country: Australia
- State: Western Australia
- LGA: Shire of Harvey
- Location: 140 km (87 mi) from Perth; 46 km (29 mi) from Bunbury; 76 km (47 mi) from Mandurah; 54 km (34 mi) from Pinjarra; 32 km (20 mi) from Australind
- Established: 1880s

Government
  - State electorate: Murray-Wellington
  - Federal division: Forrest

Area
  - Total: 66 km^{2} (25 sq mi)
- Elevation: 40.3 m (132 ft)

Population
  - Total: 2,797 (UCL 2021)
- Postcode: 6220
- Mean max temp: 23.0 °C (73.4 °F)
- Mean min temp: 11.4 °C (52.5 °F)
- Annual rainfall: 963.7 mm (37.94 in)

Harvey is a town in the South West region of Western Australia along the South Western Highway, 140 kilometres (87 mi) south of Perth, between Pinjarra and Bunbury. It has a population of 2,797. Harvey Town is known for its dairy industry and oranges.

== History ==
The original inhabitants of the Harvey area are the Pindjarup (Binjareb) and Wardandi Noongar people, who have lived there for tens of thousands of years.

Harvey's name is derived from the nearby Harvey River, named by Governor James Stirling in 1829, soon after the river's discovery by explorers Alexander Collie and Lieutenant William Preston RN.

Although not positively known, the river is most likely named after Rear Admiral John Harvey. In 1817–18, Harvey was Commander in Chief of the West Indies Station – Stirling served under him while in charge of HMS Brazen, and Harvey recommended him for promotion. Stirling named a number of Western Australian features after his former navy colleagues.

According to James Battye, Stirling selected 52 square kilometres (12,800 acres) known as Wellington Location 50A and established the Harvey River Settlement. The only improvement he made to the land, as far as is known, was the erection of a hunting lodge near the present town of Harvey, known as "The Hut", featuring a shingled roof, jarrah walls and hexagonal paving blocks. In the 1880s, this hut became the childhood home of children's author May Gibbs. Stirling called the area around the town of Harvey "Korijekup", using the Noongar name meaning "place of the red-tailed black cockatoo".

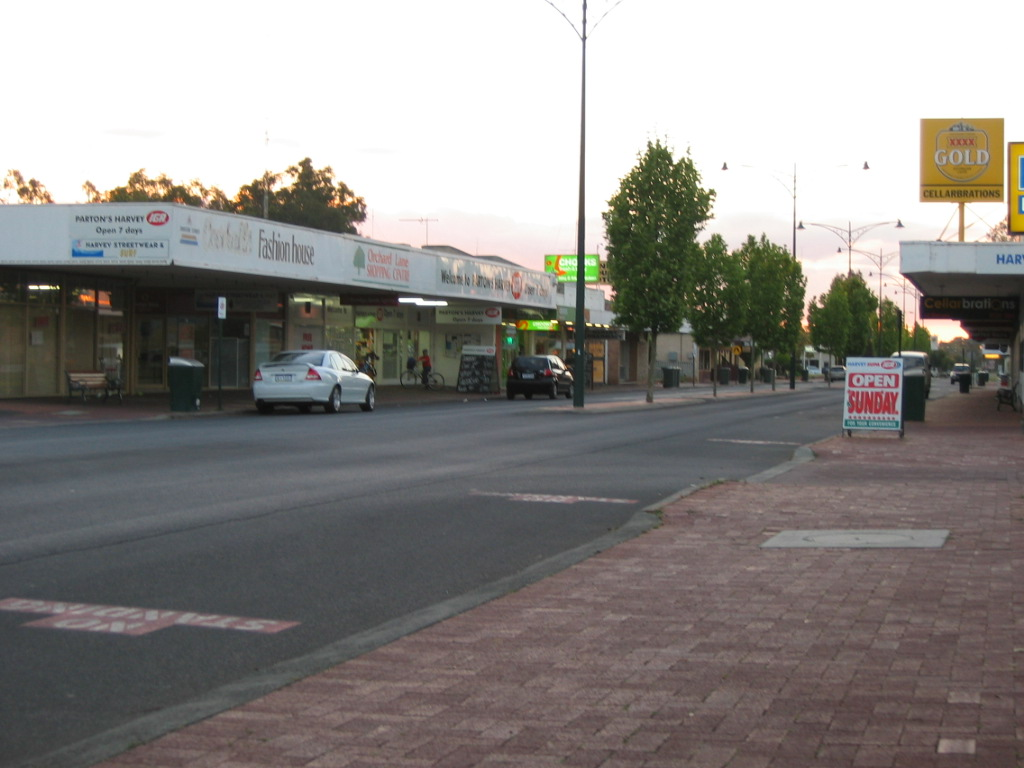
Uduc Road, Harvey, at dusk, 2006

The area was settled slowly over the remainder of the 1800s. During the 1860s, Australind, originally the site of a failed grandiose settlement scheme, was the centre of the Harvey District community. In 1863, a road was gazetted from Pinjarra to Brunswick Junction, which was built by convicts between 1864 and 1876 – it was called the "foothills route" and later became the South Western Highway.

Following the opening of a railway station in 1893, Harvey was developed as a private town by a group of investors. However, years before Harvey was begun, Cookernup, little more than a railway stop today, had a greater population, and a telegraph office and school.

In 1898, the population of Harvey town was 93 (66 males and 27 females).

In 1926, the Harvey Road Board sought the declaration of a town site, but that did not occur until 1938.

In February 2006, EG Green & Sons, the owner of the Harvey Beef brand since 1919, and responsible for about 90% of Western Australia's beef exports, went into administration. In April, however, the brand was rescued by a new consortium, which acquired EG Green & Sons and recreated it as Harvey Industries.

In 2010, Harvey gained national attention when 19-year-old Jessica Moloney became a finalist in the popular Fox8 show Australia's Next Top Model. She came in fourth place in Cycle 6 of the series.

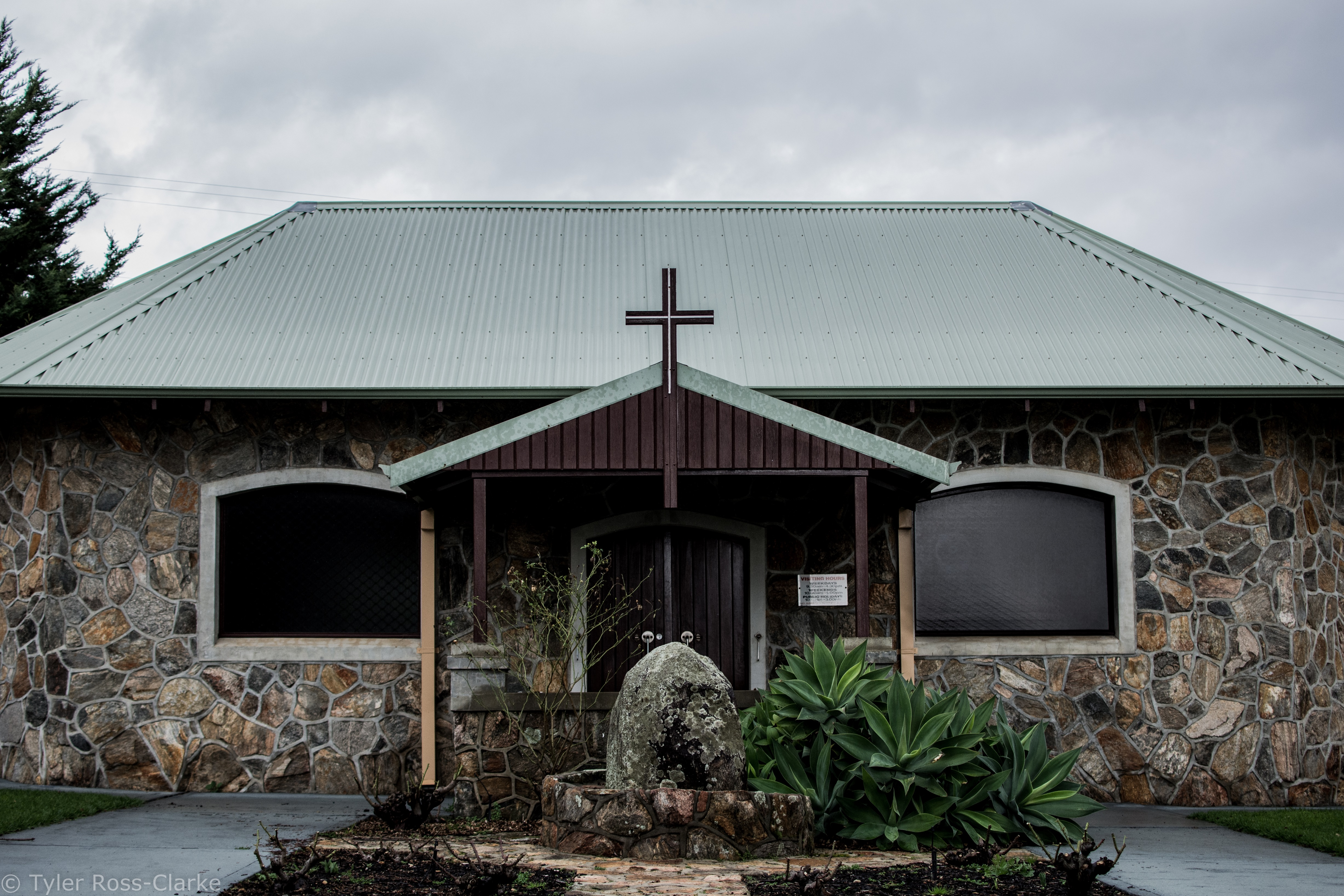
Harvey Internment Camp Shrine, 2015

== Present day ==
The town is the seat of the Shire of Harvey and is the centre of the Western Australian dairy industry. It contains a hospital, agricultural college, vocational college and the headquarters of Harvey Fresh, Harvey Beef and Harvey Cheese. Each year in April (previously October) it hosts a major agricultural show. In addition, Harvey Senior High School, two primary schools, dining and shopping facilities, banks, accommodation (hotel, motel, caravan park, farm stay), council offices and the Forest Products Commission's Timber Technology Centre are located within the town.

The railway station contains a museum which documents early life in the town, and the Stirling Cottage (actually a replica of it built 500 metres or 550 yards downstream from the original in 1994 after the original cottage succumbed to the elements in the 1960s) has been converted into a tourist information centre and tearooms. An unusual feature is the Italian Internment Shrine, built by Italian internees of Harvey No. 11 Camp during World War II and believed to be one of the only monuments of its kind in existence.

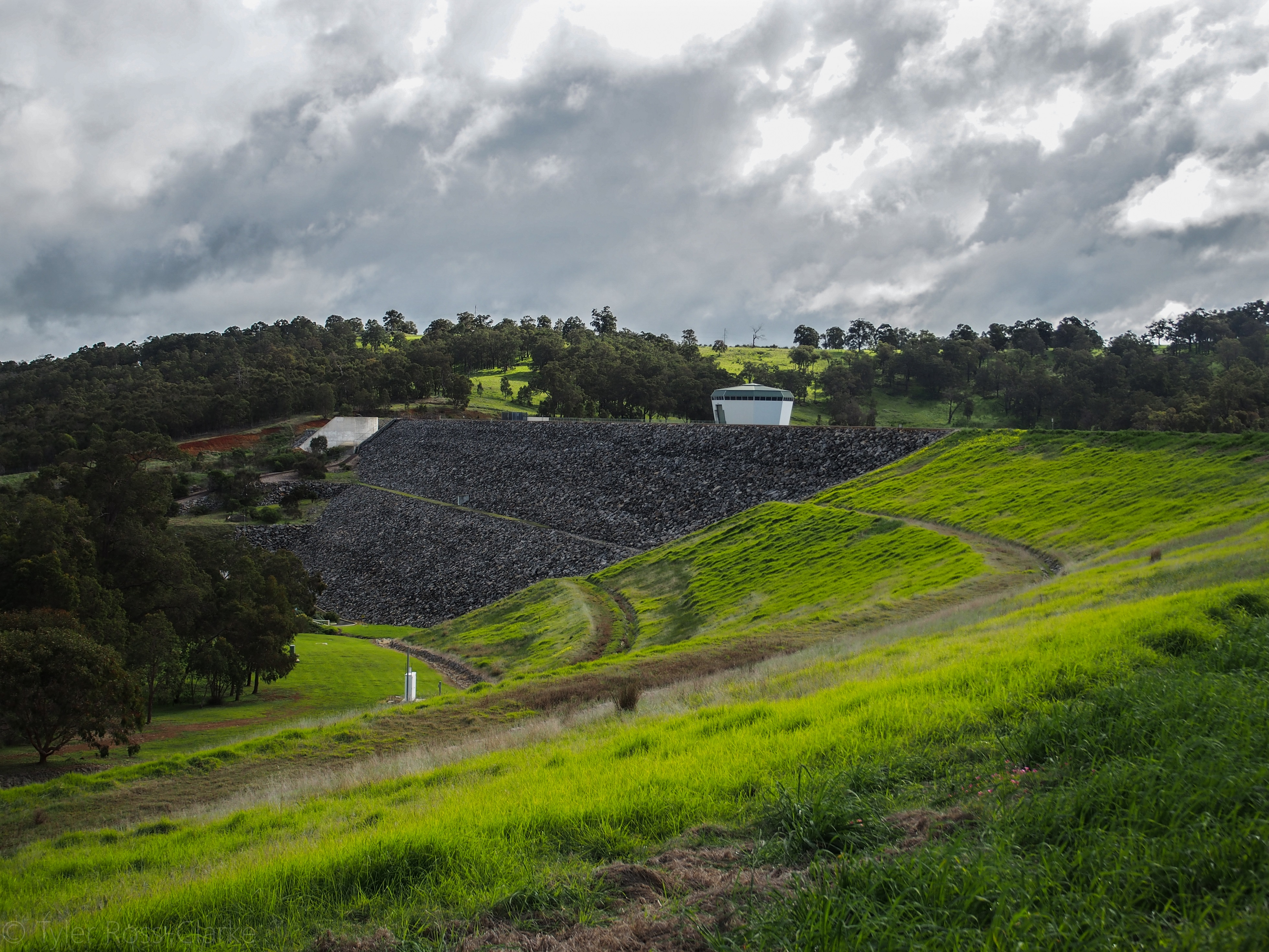
Harvey dam wall, with the tower visible top centre, 2015

Harvey is the site of the Harvey Dam, a popular recreational angling (licensed) and tourist destination, with picnic facilities, walkways and historical information. The dam wall can be traversed completely on foot.

In 2015, Harvey a new war memorial was constructed, with detailed casualty counts and information relevant to major Australian engagements.

On 7 January 2016 the residents of the town were urged to evacuate immediately by Western Australia's Department of Fire and Emergency Services due to an approaching bushfire. Patients at the Harvey District Hospital were evacuated to nearby hospitals along with residents from local nursing homes. On the evening of 8 January, after catastrophic losses in nearby Yarloop, the fire was threatening the town. Harvey was evacuated late on the afternoon of 9 January, but conditions eased the following day and the alert level was downgraded.

== Transport ==
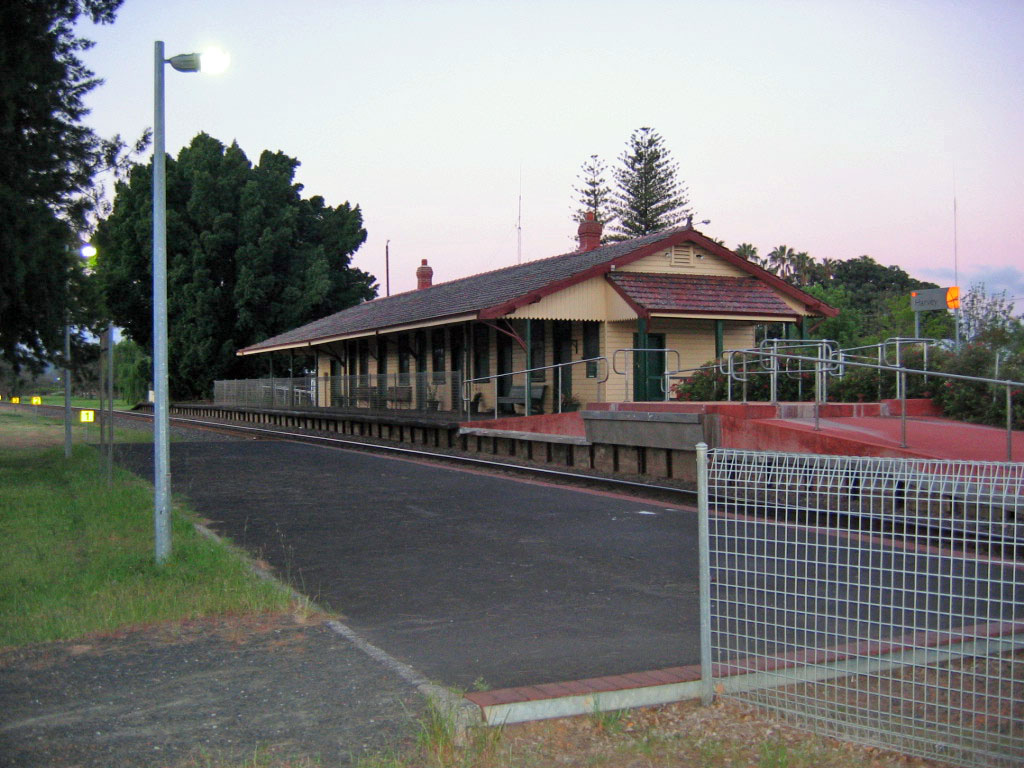
Harvey railway station, 2006

The main road route through the area is South Western Highway (Route 20; Perth to Bunbury via Pinjarra and Waroona). Uduc Road, the town's main street, goes to Old Coast Road near Myalup.

Harvey station is on the South Western Railway and served by Transwa's twice daily Australind service from Perth to Bunbury.

Transwa and South West Coachlines run daily bus service between Perth, Mandurah and Bunbury via Forrest Highway, and have stops in Harvey Intersection near Forestry Road, between Mylaup and Binningup. Private cab shuttle service also run daily to Perth Airport through Harvey.

A senior citizens bus service also run every Friday between Harvey and Bunbury.

== Tourist attractions ==
- Stirling Cottage
- Harvey Dam
- The Big Orange Tower and Harvey River Estate Winery
- Harvey Railway Station Museum
- Harvey Internment Camp Memorial Shrine (Harvey No 11 Camp)
- Harvey War Memorial Park
- Harvey River Diversion Enhancement
- Myalup Beach and Binningup Beach

== Education ==
There are two primary schools in the town: Harvey Primary School and St Anne's School. Secondary school options are Harvey Senior High School and the WA College of Agriculture – Harvey. Other popular secondary education options include Our Lady of Mercy College and Australind Senior High School, both located in Australind.

== Climate ==
Harvey experiences a Mediterranean climate with hot, dry summers and wet winters.

Climate data for Harvey
Month	Jan	Feb	Mar	Apr	May	Jun	Jul	Aug	Sep	Oct	Nov	Dec	Year
Record high °C (°F)	41.5 (106.7)	42.5 (108.5)	41.2 (106.2)	35.8 (96.4)	30.8 (87.4)	23.8 (74.8)	22.5 (72.5)	24.5 (76.1)	27.5 (81.5)	34.5 (94.1)	37.8 (100.0)	42.0 (107.6)	42.5 (108.5)
Mean daily maximum °C (°F)	31.1 (88.0)	31.3 (88.3)	29.3 (84.7)	24.8 (76.6)	21.4 (70.5)	18.4 (65.1)	17.2 (63.0)	17.7 (63.9)	18.5 (65.3)	21.4 (70.5)	25.2 (77.4)	28.6 (83.5)	23.7 (74.7)
Mean daily minimum °C (°F)	15.7 (60.3)	16.0 (60.8)	14.9 (58.8)	12.5 (54.5)	10.5 (50.9)	8.3 (46.9)	7.3 (45.1)	7.7 (45.9)	8.5 (47.3)	9.7 (49.5)	11.9 (53.4)	13.5 (56.3)	11.4 (52.5)
Record low °C (°F)	5.2 (41.4)	6.8 (44.2)	4.4 (39.9)	2.5 (36.5)	1.5 (34.7)	1.0 (33.8)	0.2 (32.4)	0.5 (32.9)	1.0 (33.8)	0.5 (32.9)	4.5 (40.1)	4.0 (39.2)	0.2 (32.4)
Average precipitation mm (inches)	12.4 (0.49)	10.2 (0.40)	13.9 (0.55)	47.3 (1.86)	121.1 (4.77)	147.3 (5.80)	154.1 (6.07)	137.2 (5.40)	121.4 (4.78)	47.6 (1.87)	38.6 (1.52)	17.8 (0.70)	865.6 (34.08)
Average rainy days	2.6	2.6	3.8	9.1	12.6	15.5	18.4	18.6	19.0	9.8	7.7	3.6	123.3

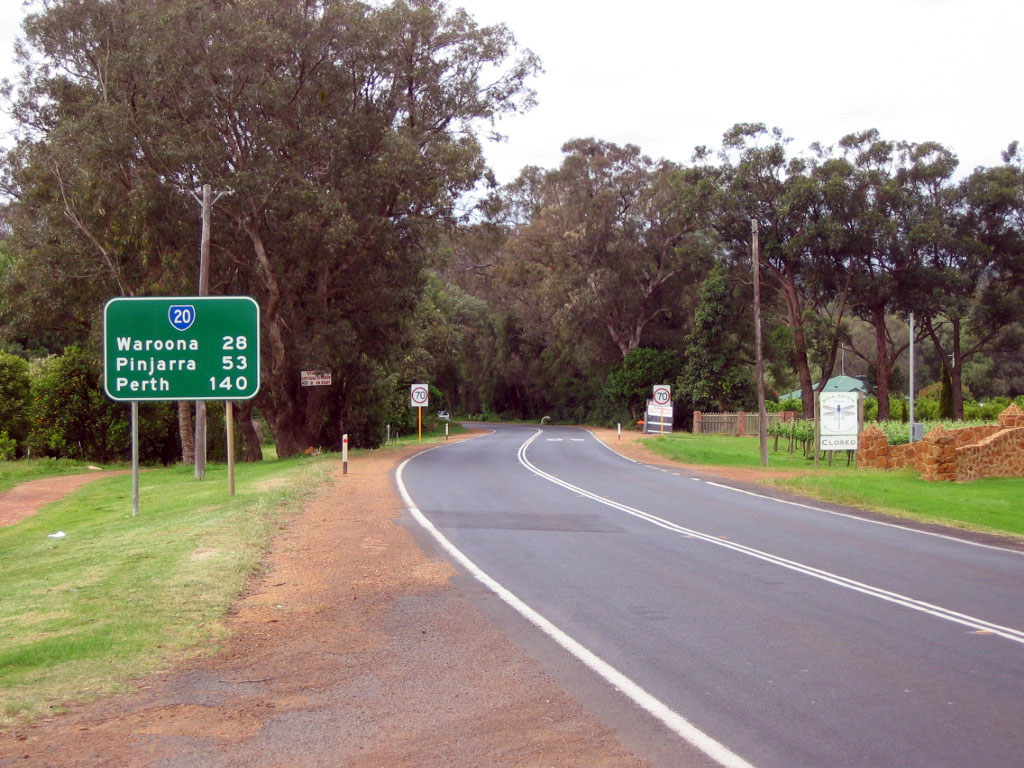
South Western Highway leaving Harvey, looking north, 2006

== Sister cities ==
- Mooka, Japan, 2022
