= Department of Fire & Emergency Services =

Government department in Western Australia

- Government agency logo

- Career Fire and Rescue Service (CFRS) Volunteer Fire and Rescue Service (VFRS)

Agency overview
- Formed: 2012
- Preceding agency: Fire and Emergency Services Authority of Western Australia (FESA)
- Jurisdiction: Government of Western Australia
- Motto: Working together for a safer state
- Annual budget: A$345M (2020)
- Minister responsible: Reece Whitby, Minister for Emergency Services
- Agency executives: Darren Klemm AFSM, Fire and Emergency Services Commissioner; Jon Broomhall AFSM, Fire and Emergency Services Deputy Commissioner (Operations); Melissa Pexton, Fire and Emergency Services Deputy Commissioner (Emergency Management)
- Child agencies: State Emergency Service (SES); Bush Fire Service (BFS); Volunteer Fire and Rescue Service (VFRS); Volunteer Fire and Emergency Service (VFES); Marine Rescue Service of Western Australia (MRS)
- Website: www.dfes.wa.gov.au

The Department of Fire & Emergency Services (DFES) is a government department responsible for fire and emergency services in Western Australia. The department was created in 2012 in reaction to the 2011 Perth Hills bushfire.

The DFES is responsible for the management, training and funding of career and volunteer services, including:

- Career Fire and Rescue Service (CFRS) 30 BGUs (Brigades, Groups and Units), 1,249 members
- Bushfire Brigade (BFB) 551 BGUs, 19, 987 members
- State Emergency Service (SES) 64 BGUs, 1,921 members
- Volunteer Fire and Emergency Services (VFES) 40 BGUs, 1,184 members
- Volunteer Fire and Rescue Service (VFRS) 93 BGUs, 2,369 members
- Marine Rescue Western Australia (MRWA) 39 BGUs, 1,677 members
- Public Service Officers and Technicians 658 members
  - Updated as of October 2026**

The DFES currently employs 1,249 career firefighters and over 600 staff members, as well as over 29,000 volunteers in the six services state-wide.

There are also 2,579 members in the Emergency Services Cadets and Youth programs across five services.

== History ==
The Department of Fire and Emergency Services was formerly known as the Fire and Emergency Services Authority of Western Australia (FESA), a statutory government authority created in January 1999 to administer the following legislation within the state of Western Australia:

- Fire and Emergency Services Authority of Western Australia Act 1998
- Fire Brigades Act 1942
- Bush Fires Act 1954
- Emergency Services Levy Act 2002
- Emergency Management Act 2005

The department was unaffected by the change in government following the 2017 Western Australian state elections.

=== Fire and Rescue Service of Western Australia ===
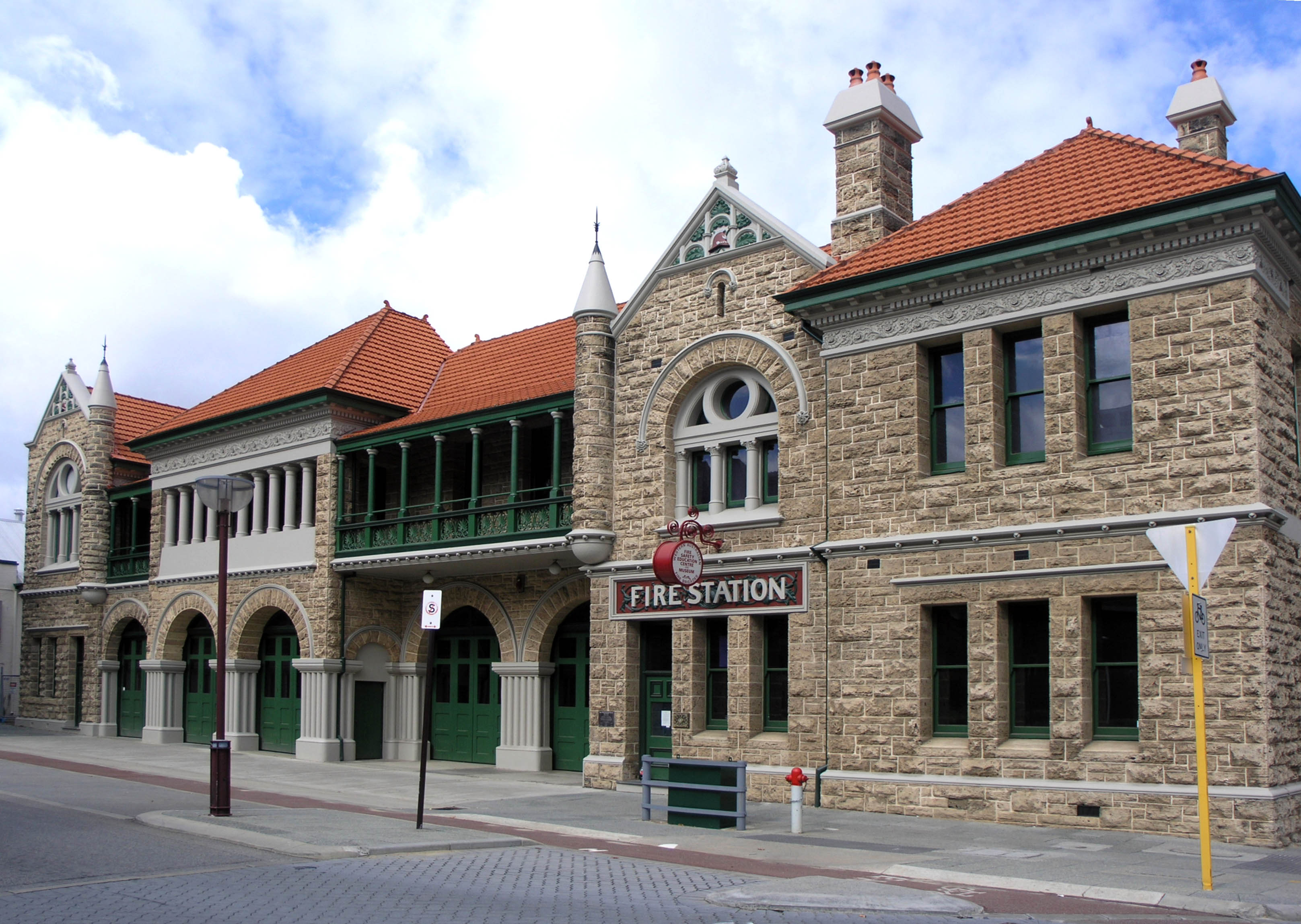
Old Perth Fire Station, the first in Western Australia; now a museum

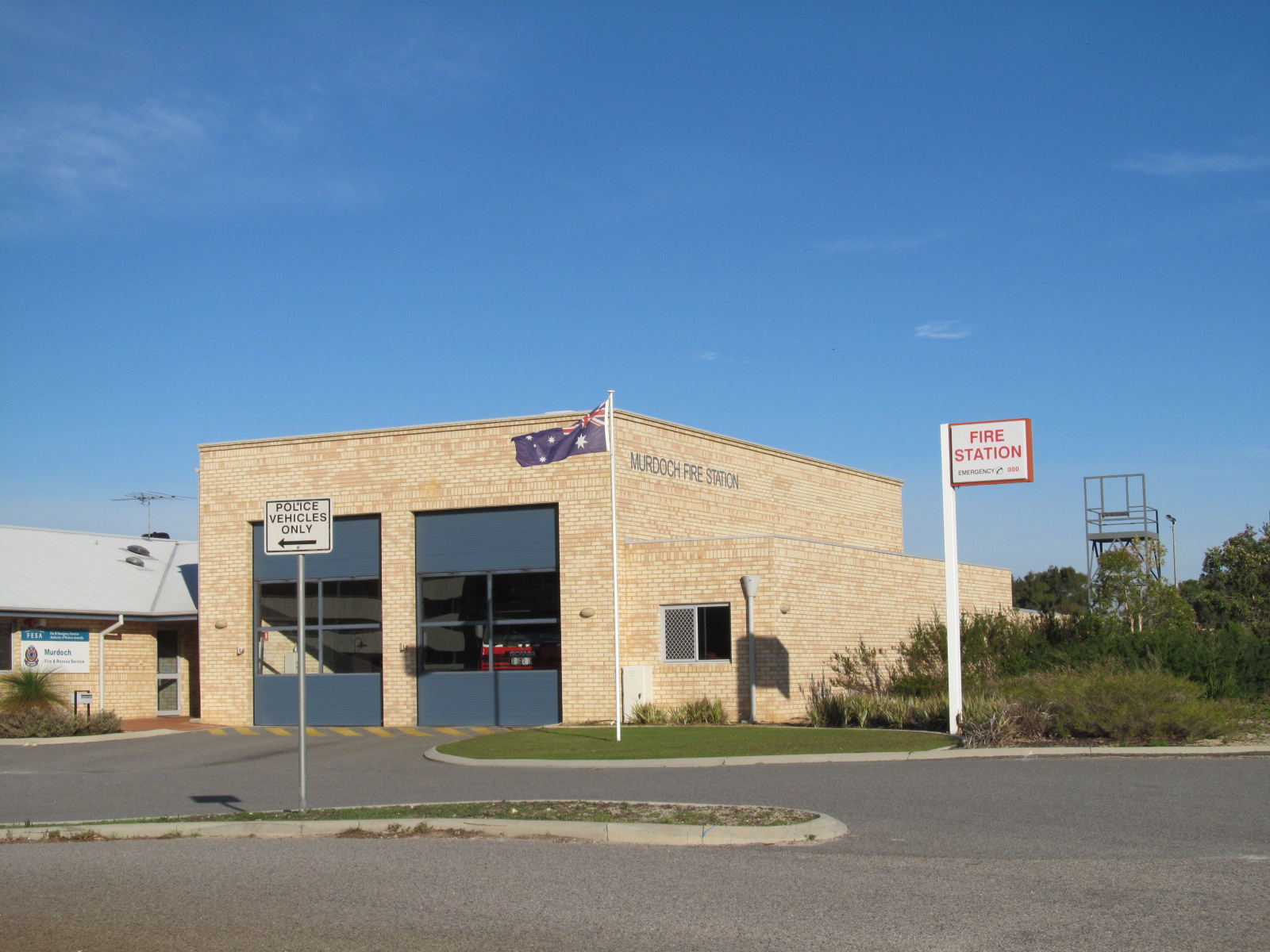
Murdoch fire station

The inaugural meeting of the Fire Brigades' Board was held on 16 January 1899. This later led to the establishment of the Western Australian Fire Brigades' Board in 1909. Western Australian Fire Brigades updated their name in 1995 to Fire and Rescue Service of Western Australia to more accurately reflect the service provided to the communities of Western Australia.

In 1999, the creation of FESA brought together the Fire and Rescue Service and the Bush Fire Service to form the Fire Services Division of FESA. The Fire and Rescue Service and Bush Fire Services actively maintain their original identities.

The Department of Fire and Emergency Services was established in 2012 and replaced FESA. Wayne Gregson (a former Western Australia Police assistant commissioner) was appointed the first Fire and Emergency Commissioner. The current headquarters are located at Stockton Bend in Cockburn Central. This building includes the state and metropolitan operations centres, state-wide communications centre, operations and capability commands and corporate services.

== Structure ==
The Department of Fire and Emergency Services operates under the Emergency Services Minister of the Government of Western Australia and is the Hazard Management Agency for cyclones, floods, storms, tsunami, structural collapses, HAZMAT incidents, earthquakes and fires. Their operational branch comprises metropolitan and country operations, operations capability, and oversees the listed services.

The Career Fire and Rescue Service of Western Australia consists of 1,249 paid firefighters working from 26 metropolitan stations and four country stations. Career firefighters attend a 21-week training course held at the academy in Forrestfield. They work on a roster of two 10-hour day shifts followed by two 14-hour night shifts and four days off. Metropolitan stations operate with at least one urban pumper and light tanker, with a crew of one station officer and three firefighters, while Perth Station does not run light tankers. Country stations operate with a crew of one station officer and five firefighters. Some metropolitan stations operate as relieving stations where two additional firefighters are on shift; these firefighters will fill short staffing at other stations if the need arises.

Appliance allocation is typically one Urban Pumper and one Light Tanker, with a second pump located at Perth, Vincent, Daglish, Fremantle, Welshpool and Bunbury. Two CLPs (Combined Ladder Platforms) are located at Perth and Fremantle stations. Two SET's (Specialised Equipment Tender) are located at Murdoch and Osborne Park. Four permanent Urban Tankers are located at Joondalup, Malaga, Cardup and Cockburn, with additional Urban Tankers added at Ellenbrook, Hope Valley, Midland, Kiara, Welshpool, Butler and Maddington, during the high threat period. The ICV (Incident Control Vehicle) is located at Belmont Station, The POD carrier is also located at Canning Vale for USAR CAT2 trained personnel.

The Volunteer Fire and Rescue Service (VFRS) is a volunteer service predominantly attending motor vehicle accidents, structure fires, and HAZMAT incidents in large urban areas. In 2024 the VFRS had 2,219 volunteer firefighters in 93 brigades across the state.

The Bush Fire Service is a volunteer service that attends any fire outside of a gazetted fire district within a brigade's local government area. They predominantly combat bushfires and conduct hazard reduction burning on a local level. As of 2024, there are 551 Bushfire Brigades with 20,227 volunteers. 37 of these stations are located in the Perth metropolitan area.

The Volunteer Fire and Emergency Services is another volunteer service, established to combine the resources of any combination of a Bush Fire Service Brigade, a VFRS Brigade, MR Group or an SES Unit to replace the Volunteer Fire Services and Volunteer Emergency Service in 2016 It has 1,184 volunteers as of 2024.

The State Emergency Service (SES) refers to a number of civil defence organisations that provide assistance during and after natural disasters and in search and rescue incidents where elevated equipment and skills are needed compared to more general emergency services. They attend land searches for missing people, storm damage, urban search and rescue, cliff rescue, road crash rescue, transporting personnel and equipment to fires as well as many other roles. The SES have a K9 unit with volunteers' dogs being trained in searching for missing people and a mounted unit for land searches. As of 2024, they had 1,020 members and 64 units.

The Marine Rescue Service Western Australia is another volunteer service tasked with assisting the Western Australian Police with searches for missing people or vessels, assisting disabled vessels, and rescues in water around the state. As of 2024 there are 39 MRS Groups with 1,667 volunteers.

In April 2018, a new Rural Fire Division was established after the findings of the 2016 Waroona Bushfire Special Inquiry. It is another branch under the DFES structure and consists of:

- Bushfire Centre of Excellence (training and research into Bushfire mitigation)
- State Bushfire Mitigation
- Bushfire Technical Services
- Land Use Planning
- Office of Bushfire Risk Management

=== Ranks and insignia ===
DFES Executives
Title	Epaulette	Helmet
Commissioner	Crossed staffs in gold wreath with red background below a crown.	Black 2 × white stripes on both sides
Deputy Commissioner	Crossed staffs in gold wreath with red background below 3 pips	Black 1 × white stripe on both sides
Assistant Commissioner	Crossed staffs in gold wreath with red background below 2 pips	Black
Chief Superintendent	Crossed staffs in gold wreath with red background below 1 pip	Silver 1 × white stripe on both sides
Superintendent	Crossed staffs in gold wreath with red background	Silver
District Officer (DO Urban & Rural Fire)	3 blue impellors	Blue 1 × white stripe
District Officer (DO Natural Hazards)	3 gold pips	Blue 1 × white stripe
Area Officer (AO)	2 blue impellors below a band	Blue
Community Emergency Services Manager (CESM)	2 gold pips, local government name printed below	Lime green 1 × white stripe on both sides
Career Fire & Rescue
Station Officer (SO)	2 blue impellors	Red 2 × blue impellors on both sides
Leading Firefighter	3 yellow chevrons below 2 crossed red axes	Yellow 3 × yellow chevrons on both sides
Senior Leading Firefighter – 15 years (SFF–15)	3 × chevrons ( 2 × yellow above 1 × red) below 2 crossed red axes	Yellow 3 × chevrons ( 2 × yellow above 1 × red) on both sides
Senior Firefighter	2 × yellow chevrons below 2 crossed red axes	Yellow 2 × yellow chevrons on both sides
Firefighter 1st & 2nd class	1 × yellow chevron below 2 crossed red axes	Yellow 1 × yellow chevron on both sides
Firefighter 5th, 4th & 3rd class	2 crossed red axes	Yellow
Trainee Firefighter	Blank coloured epaulette	Yellow
Volunteer Fire & Rescue Service
VFRS Captain	3 × red bars below a red impellor	Lime green
VFRS Lieutenant	2 × red bars below a red impellor	White 1 × blue stripe on both sides
VFRS Apparatus Officer	1 × red bar below a red impellor	White 1 × green stripe on both sides
VFRS Secretary (Non-active)	1 × yellow line above SECRETARY in writing	N/A
VFRS Leading Firefighter	3 × red chevrons below 2 crossed branches	White
VFRS Senior Firefighter	2 × red chevrons below 2 crossed branches	White
VFRS Qualified Firefighter	1 × red chevron below 2 crossed branches	White
VFRS Firefighter	2 crossed branches	White
VFRS Ex Captain	1 × yellow impellow above EX CAPTAIN in writing	White

== Stations ==
=== Metropolitan Career fire stations. ===
Along with the 26 career fire stations, there are 12 Volunteer Fire and Rescue stations located with in the Metropolitan Fire District. These stations are located at Armadale, Falcon, Kalamunda, Kwinana, Metropolitan VFRS (located at Forrestfield) Mandurah, Mundaring, Rockingham, Roleystone, Secret Harbour, and Yanchep. There are also four Volunteer Fire and Emergency Service stations, located at Baldivis, Bullsbrook, Karnup, and SWORD (State wide operational response division in Kewdale).

Station	Appliances			Co-located with VFRS
Station	Pump + LT	Specialist & Support	State Operational Support Fleet (SOSF)	Co-located with VFRS
Armadale	Armadale 1st (UPHR) Armadale LT			Armadale 2nd VFRS HSR, LT and SOSF 3.4UT
Belmont	Belmont Pump (UP) Belmont LT	Belmont ICV Foam Trailer		
Butler	Butler Pump (UPHR) Butler LT		Butler SOSF 3.4UT	
Canning Vale	Canning Vale Pump (UP) Canning Vale LT	USAR PODCAR 1 & 3, with containers		
Cardup	Cardup Pump (UPHR) Cardup LT	Cardup 3.4UT		
Claremont	Claremont Pump (UP) Claremont LT			
Cockburn	Cockburn Pump (UP) Cockburn LT	Foam Trailer Cockburn 3.4UT Cockburn Rehab	Cockburn LT2	
Daglish	Daglish 1st (UP) Daglish 1st LT Daglish 2nd (UPHR)		Daglish 2nd LT	
Duncraig	Duncraig Pump (UP) Duncraig LT		Duncraig LT2	
Ellenbrook	Ellenbrook Pump (UPHR) Ellenbrook LT		Ellenbrook SOSF 3.4UT	
Fremantle	Fremantle 1st (UP) Fremantle 1st LT Fremantle 2nd (UPHR) Fremantle 2nd LT	Fremantle CLP Foam Trailer		
Hope Valley	Hope Valley Pump (UPHR) Hope Valley LT		Hope Valley SOSF 3.4UT	
Joondalup	Joondalup Pump (UP) Joondalup LT	Joondalup 2.4UT		
Kensington	Kensington Pump (UP) Kensington LT			
Kiara	Kiara Pump (UP) Kiara LT		Kiara SOSF 3.4UT or SOSF LT	
Maddington	Maddington Pump (UP) Maddington LT		Maddington SOSF 3.4UT	
Malaga	Malaga Pump (UP) Malaga LT	Malaga 2.4UT		
Mandurah	Mandurah 1st (UPHR) Mandurah 1st LT			Mandurah 2nd VFRS 3.4UT, LT and Rescue Trailer
Midland	Midland Pump (UPHR) Midland LT		Midland SOSF 3.4UT	
Murdoch	Murdoch Pump (UP) Murdoch LT	Murdoch SET		
Osborne Park	Osborne Park Pump (UP) Osborne Park LT	Osborne Park SET		
Perth	Perth 1st (UP) Perth 2nd (UP)	Perth CLP Perth VRV Perth OSV DO Perth		
Rockingham	Rockingham 1st (UP) Rockingham 1st LT			Rockingham 2nd VFRS HSR, LT and 3rd LT
Vincent	Vincent 1st (UP) Vincent 1st LT Vincent 2nd (UPHR) Vincent 2nd LT	Vincent Rehab		
Wangara	Wangara Pump (UP) Wangara LT	Foam Trailer		
Welshpool	Welshpool 1st (UP) Welshpool 1st LT Welshpool 2nd (UPHR)		Welshpool SOSF 3.4UT Welshpool 2nd LT	

=== Country Career Fire Stations ===
Station	Appliances		
Station	Pump + LT	Specialist & Support	State Operational Support Fleet (SOSF)
Albany	Albany 1st (UPHR) Albany 1st LT	Albany 1st 3.4UT Albany Ute	Albany 1st LT2
Bunbury	Bunbury 1st (UPHR) Bunbury 1st LT Bunbury 2nd (UPHR) Bunbury 2nd LT	Bunbury 2.4B Bunbury Ute Bunbury CSR Trailer Bunbury USAR Trailer South West BA Trailer Bunbury Foam Trailer Bunbury Lighting Tower Trailer	
Kalgoorlie	Kalgoorlie 1st (UPHR) Kalgoorlie 1st LT	Kalgoorlie 1st 3.4UT	Kalgoorlie 1st LT 2
Geraldton	Geraldton 1st (UPHR) Geraldton 1st LT Geraldton 1st LT2 Geraldton HSR	Geraldton Ute Geraldton CSR Trailer Geraldton Foam Trailer	Geraldton 3.4UT

== Vehicles and equipment ==
The department maintains and coordinates a range of specialist equipment and emergency response vehicles. This includes pumpers and tankers, aerial ladders and other equipment designed to combat incidents including search and rescue, urban search and rescue, firefighting and other natural disasters.

Appliances used by DFES brigades groups and units include:

=== Pumpers ===
Fleet ID	Appliance Type	Appliance Specifications			Body Builder
Fleet ID	Appliance Type	Cab Chassis	Pump and Capacity	Water and Foam Capacity	Body Builder
UP	Urban Pump	Scania P310/320	Waterous CMC (Split shaft) twin stage 4,732 L/min (1,250 US gal/min) at 1.0 MPa (150 psi) Waterous CMK (PTO) twin stage 4,732 L/min (1,250 US gal/min) at 1.0 MPa (150 psi) (UP/UPHR 37 onwards)	Water: 1,200 L (320 US gal) Foam A: 60 L (16 US gal) Foam B: 200 L (53 US gal)	Paull and Warner Resources (UP/UPHR 37 onwards) Southwest Fire Units
UPHR	Urban Pump Heavy Rescue	Scania P310/320	Waterous CMC (Split shaft) twin stage 4,732 L/min (1,250 US gal/min) at 1.0 MPa (150 psi) Waterous CMK (PTO) twin stage 4,732 L/min (1,250 US gal/min) at 1.0 MPa (150 psi) (UP/UPHR 37 onwards)	Water: 1,200 L (320 US gal) Foam A: 60 L (16 US gal) Foam B: 200 L (53 US gal)	Paull and Warner Resources (UP/UPHR 37 onwards) Southwest Fire Units
MPHR	Medium Pump Heavy Rescue	Scania 94D	Waterous CSHK twin stage 3,500 L/min (920 US gal/min) at 1.0 MPa (150 psi)	Water: 1,200 L (320 US gal) Foam A: 60 L (16 US gal) Foam B: 200 L (53 US gal)	WA Fire Appliances
HP	Heavy Pump	Scania P310	Waterous CMC (Split shaft) twin stage 4,800 L/min (1,300 US gal/min) at 1.0 MPa (150 psi)	Water: 1,400 L (370 US gal) Foam A: 60 L (16 US gal) Foam B: 240 L (63 US gal)	Southwest Fire Units
VP	Volunteer Pump Urban Pump Type 2	Volvo FM	Waterous CXK (PTO) single stage 4,000 L/min (1,100 US gal/min) at 1.0 MPa (150 psi)	Water: 1,200 L (320 US gal) Foam A: 60 L (16 US gal) Foam B: 200 L (53 US gal)	Paull and Warner Resources
CP	Urban Pump Type 2 (Previously Country Pump)	Iveco Eurocargo	Waterous CGVK (PTO) single stage 3,000 L/min (790 US gal/min) at 1.0 MPa (150 psi)	Water: 1,200 L (320 US gal) Foam A: 60 L (16 US gal) Foam B: 200 L (53 US gal)	Frontline Fire and Rescue (CP18 and 3 Indian Ocean Territories trucks)
CP	Urban Pump Type 2 (Previously Country Pump)	Isuzu FTR	Waterous CGVK (PTO) single stage 3,000 L/min (790 US gal/min) at 1.0 MPa (150 psi)	Water: 1,200 L (320 US gal) Foam A: 60 L (16 US gal) Foam B: 200 L (53 US gal)	WA Fire Appliances Paull and Warner Resources (CP20)
HSR	Urban Pump Type 3 (Previously HSR, HAZMAT Structural Rescue)	Isuzu FTS 4x4	Waterous CLSK (PTO) single stage 1,800 L/min (480 US gal/min) at 1.0 MPa (150 psi)	Water: 1,400 L (370 US gal) Foam A: 60 L (16 US gal) Foam B: 200 L (53 US gal)	McDonald Johnson Southwest Fire Units Frontline Fire and Rescue

=== Tankers ===
Firefighting tankers are used across all services, including CFRS, VFRS, VFES and BFB. Tankers are designated by their water capacity, drive type (2wd or 4wd), and capability. For example, 1.4R means approximately 1,000 litres, 4×4, designed for a rural environment.

B - Broadacre - Designed for fighting mostly farmland and cropping areas, has minimal stowage on the vehicle.

R - Rural - Designed for fighting fires in the rural area. This designation is no longer in production.

U/UT - Urban/Urban Tanker - Designed for urban environments and towns, has the capabilities to go off road and carries urban fire fighting stowage. The newer generation are also being fitted with Central Tyre Inflation Systems (CTIS), and remote controlled bullbar mounted bumper monitor. Structural capable appliances with FRS VFES and some BFB's carry Breathing aparatus.

Tankers also include a range of comprehensive crew protection items. This includes in-cab air units, radiant heat shields, burnover blankets, crew protection deluge system, and automatic vehicle locators (AVL).

Fleet ID	Appliance Type	Appliance Specifications			Body Builder
Fleet ID	Appliance Type	Cab Chassis	Pump and Capacity	Water and Foam Capacity	Body Builder
LT (DFES) N/E (Local Government	Light Tanker/Ultra Light Tanker	Landcruiser 79 Series	GAAM MK70 close coupled to HATZ 1B50 engine, 550 L/min at 5 Bar GAAM MK70 close coupled to Honda GX270 engine, 550 L/min at 5 Bar	Water: 500L Foam A: 20L	Technifire Frontline Fire and Rescue (Ultra Light Tankers)
RU (DFES) N/E (Local Government)	1.4RU / 1.4R	Mitsubishi Canter Isuzu NPS Iveco Daily	GAAM MK125 close coupled to Kubota Z482 engine, 350 L/min at 7 Bar (Iveco Daily) GAAM MK125 close coupled to HATZ 2G40 engine, 350 L/min at 7 Bar (Mitsubishi/Iszusu)	Water: 1000 - 1400L Foam A: 20L	Technifire Frontline Fire and Rescue
BT/UT (DFES) N/E (Local Government)	2.4UT / 2.4B / 2.4R	Isuzu FTS/FSS Hino FT	Waterous CP-2 close coupled to Isuzu 4CE1, 1200 L/min at 7 bar (2.4B) PTO Driven Hale AP-50, 1800 L/min at 10 Bar (2.4R/UT) GAAM MK300/400 close coupled to HATZ 2L41C, 1500 L/min at 10 bar (2.4UT)	Water: 2,000–2,400 L (530–630 US gal) Foam A: 20–60 L (5.3–15.9 US gal) Foam B: 200 L (53 US gal)	WA Fire Appliances (2.4R) South West Fire Units (2.4UT) Varley Group (2.4B)
UT (DFES) N/E (Local Government)	3.4UT / 3.4R (old, not being made anymore)	Isuzu FTS	PTO driven Waterous CLVK, 1800 L/min at 10 bar. Waterous CLVT close coupled to Isuzu 4JG1 engine, 1800 L/min at 10 bar.	Water: 3,000–3,600 L (790–950 US gal) Foam A: 60 L (16 US gal) Foam B: 200 L (53 US gal)	McDonald Johnson Engineering Frontline Fire and Rescue
BT (DFES) N/E (Local Government)	4.4R / 4.4B	Isuzu FTS Tatra T815 Volvo FL Iveco Eurocargo (no longer available)	PTO Driven Hale AP-50, 1800 L/min at 10 Bar (4.4R) GAAM MK300 close coupled to HATZ 4L41C or Isuzu 4CE1, 1100 L/min at 7 bar	Water: 4,000–4,600 L (1,100–1,200 US gal) Foam A: 40 L (11 US gal)	WA Fire Appliances (4.4R) Frontline Fire and Rescue (4.4B)
BWT/SM (DFES) N/E (Local Government)	12.2 / 9.2	Isuzu FVZ 6x4	PTO driven Waterous CLVK, 1400 L/min	Water: 12,000L 9,000 L	WA Fire Appliances Varley Group (UAE donation) Frontline Fire and Rescue

=== Specialist Vehicles ===
- Road Crash Rescue Tender (RCR)
- Bulk Water Tankers (BWT) 9.2 and 12.2
- Incident Control Vehicle (ICV)
- Combination Ladder Platform (CLP)
- Combination Aerial Pumper (CAPA) Appliance (CAPA) (due to enter service in 2027/2028, first one to be stationed at Welshpool replacing one of the pumps, it will then be at Duncraig, Joondalup and Fremantle for metro, Bunbury for regional, replacing one of the pumps.)
- POD Carrier
- Vertical Rescue Vehicle (VRV)
- Rehabilitation Vehicle

=== SES/Volunteer Fire and Emergency Services vehicles ===
- Personnel Carrier (Toyota Landcruiser 70 Series V8 Troop Carrier used to transport personnel and equipment to incidents)
- General Rescue Utility (Isuzu NPS 75-155/NPR 75-190 used to transport rescue/communications equipment to incidents)
- General Rescue Truck
- Commuter Bus
- Road Crash Rescue Tender
- Flood Rescue Boat

=== Aerial Fleet ===
Quantity	Aircraft	Water Capacity	Base Location	Photos	Remarks
6	Bell 214B	2,650 L (700 US gal)	2 at Jandakot (YPJT) 2 at Busselton (YBLN)		671 – N1073W; 672 – N254SM; 673 – N214LJ; 674 – N49732; 676 – N216PJ; 677 – N217PJ
5	Eurocopter AS355 Écureuil	Air Attack Supervisor	4 at Jandakot (YPJT) 1 at Bunbury (YBUN)		N/A
2	Eurocopter AS365 Dauphin	Air Intel	2 at Jandakot (YPJT)		N/A
2	Lockheed C-130 Hercules	15,000 L (4,000 US gal)	2 at Busselton (YBLN)		N/A
4	UH-60 Blackhawk	4,500 L (1,200 US gal)	2 at Gingin 2 at Serpentine		
3	Leonardo AW139	Rescue Helicopter	1 at Jandakot (YPJT); 1 at Bunbury(YBUN); 1 Spare		RSCU651 – VH-8AR; RSCU652 – VH-8AU; RSCU653 – VH-8AW

=== Gallery ===
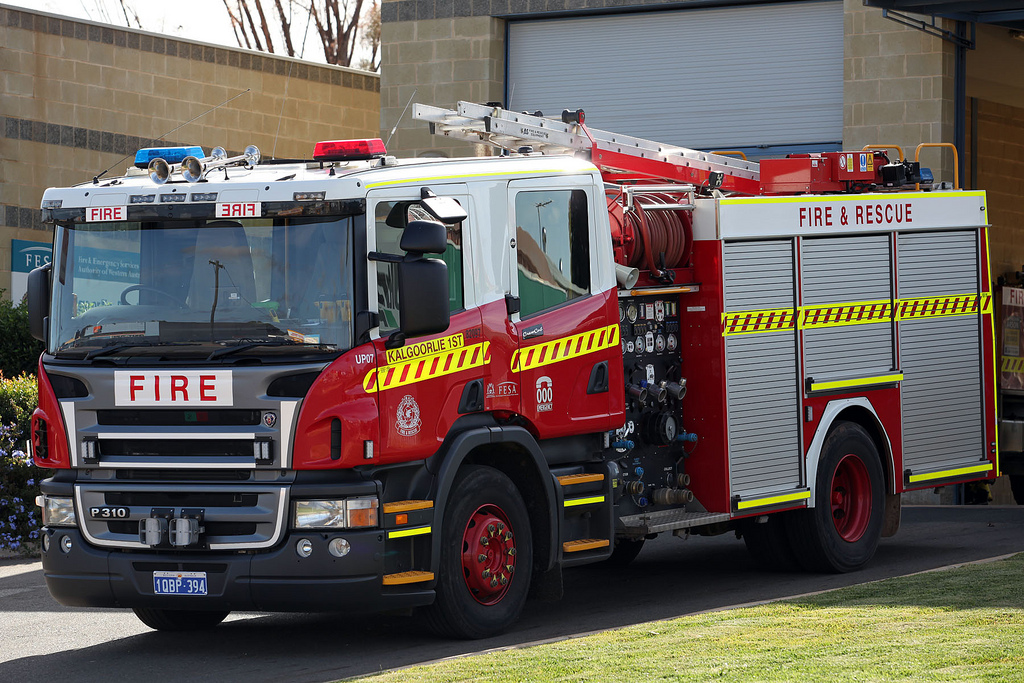
Scania Urban Pump (UPT1) (Kalgoorlie 1st UP)

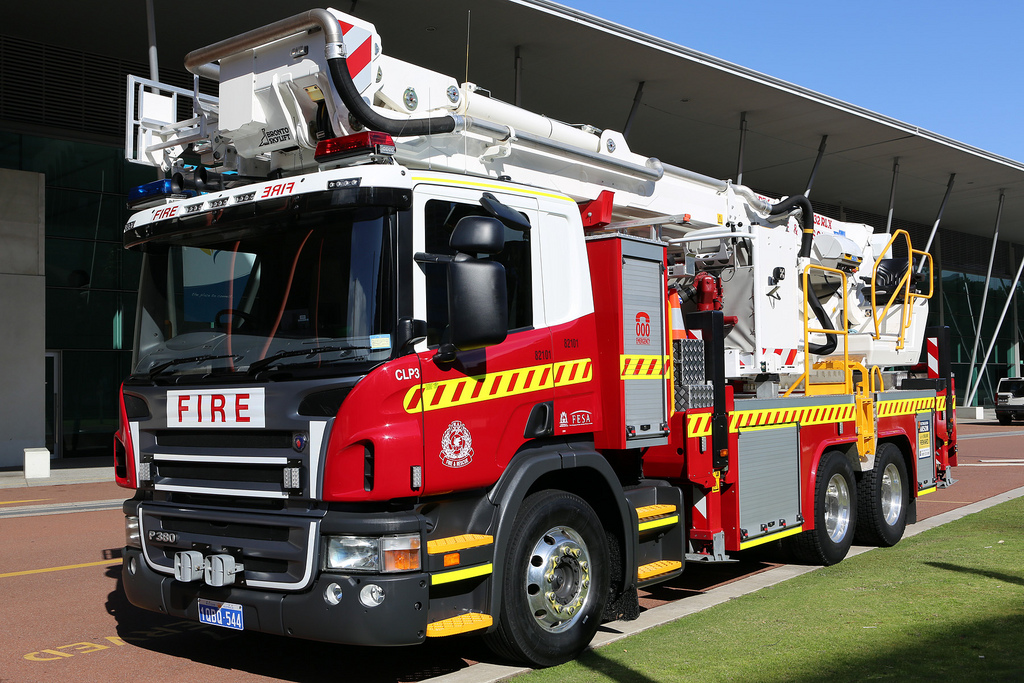
Combination Ladder Platform (CLP) (Perth CLP)

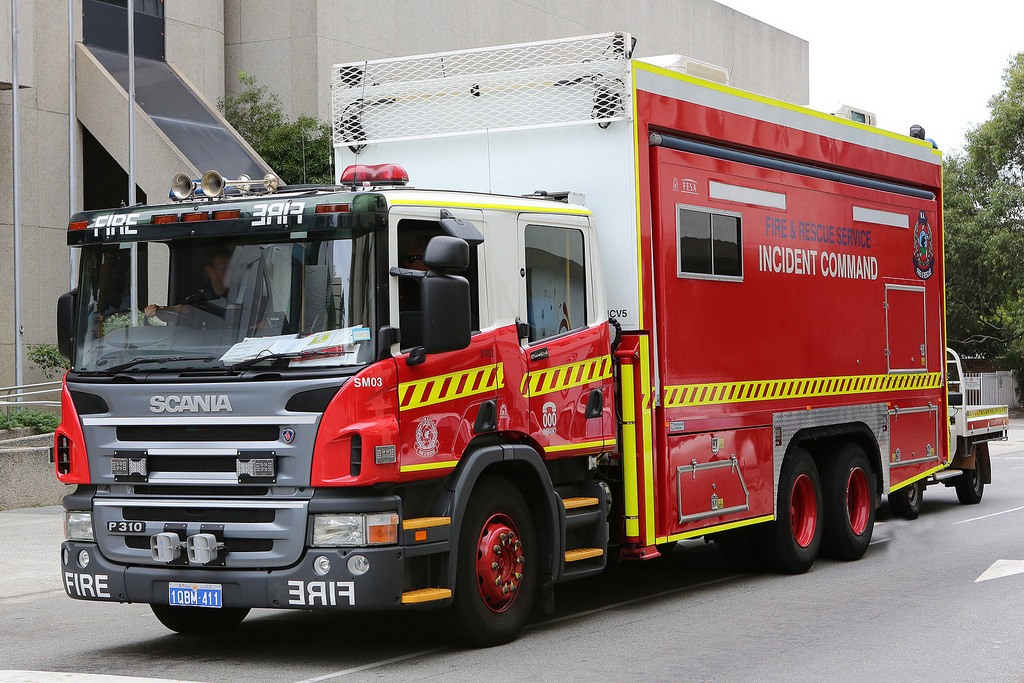
Incident Control Vehicle (ICV) (Belmont ICV)

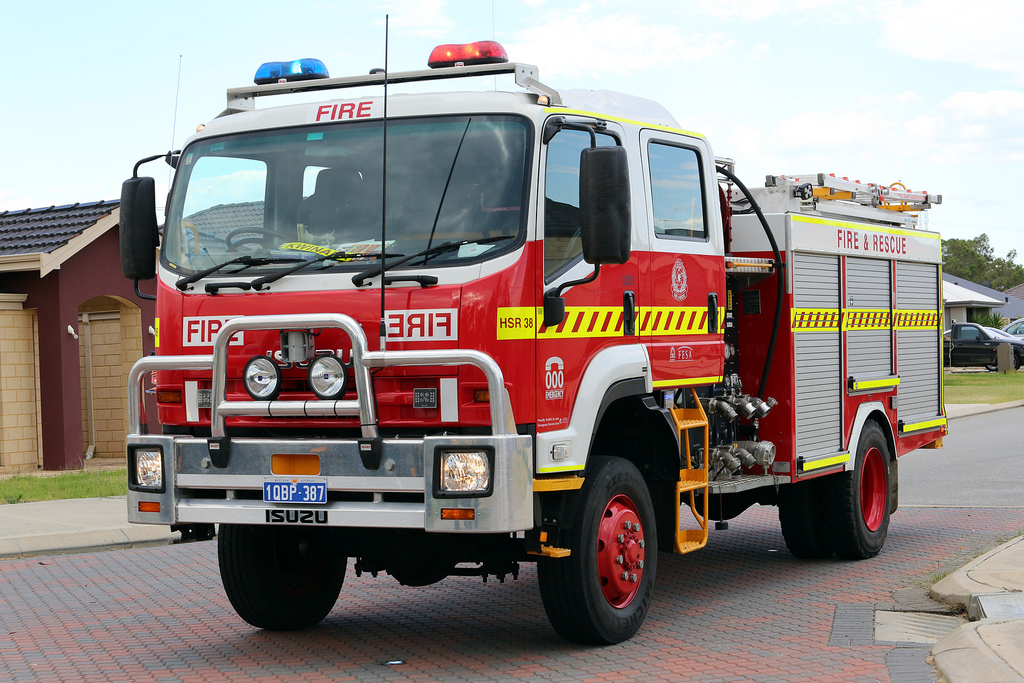
Hazmat Structure Rescue (UPT3) (Kwinana HSR)

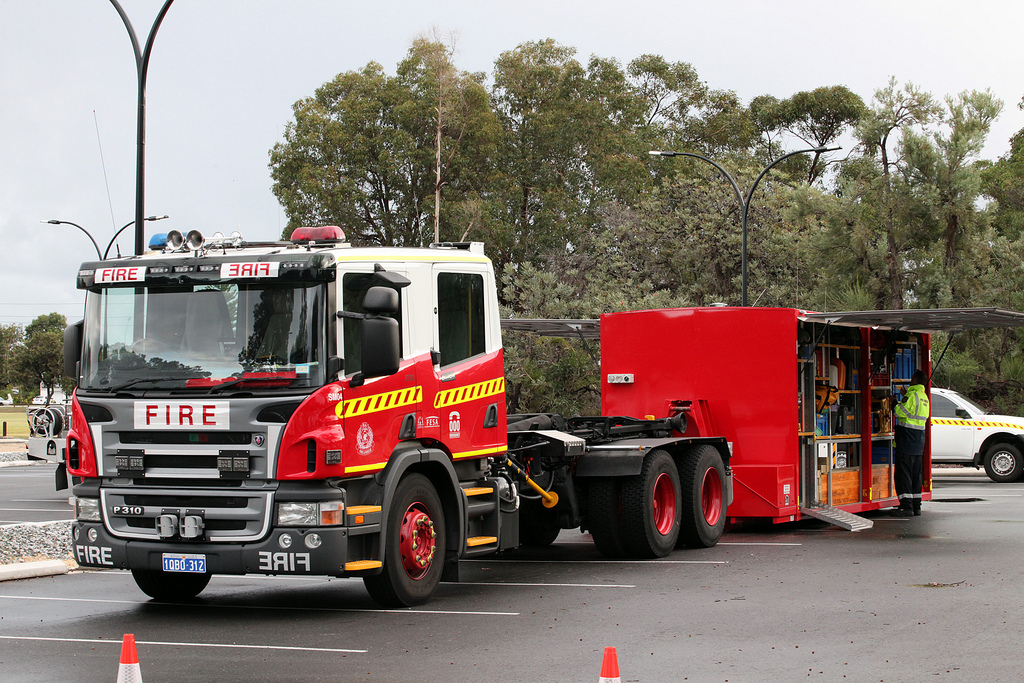
POD Carrier (USAR POD4)

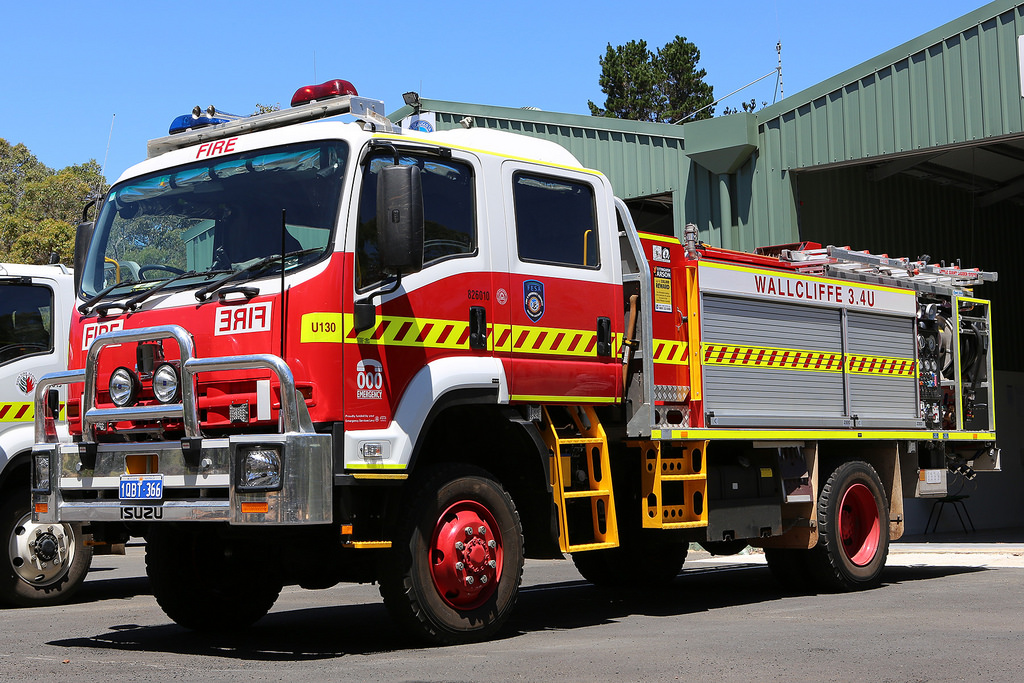
3.4U Urban Tanker (Wallcliffe 3.4U)

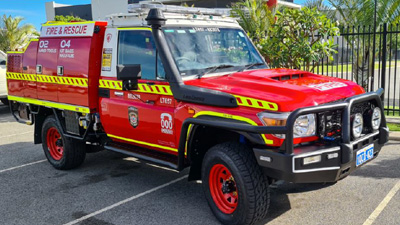
VFRS/CFRS Light Tanker

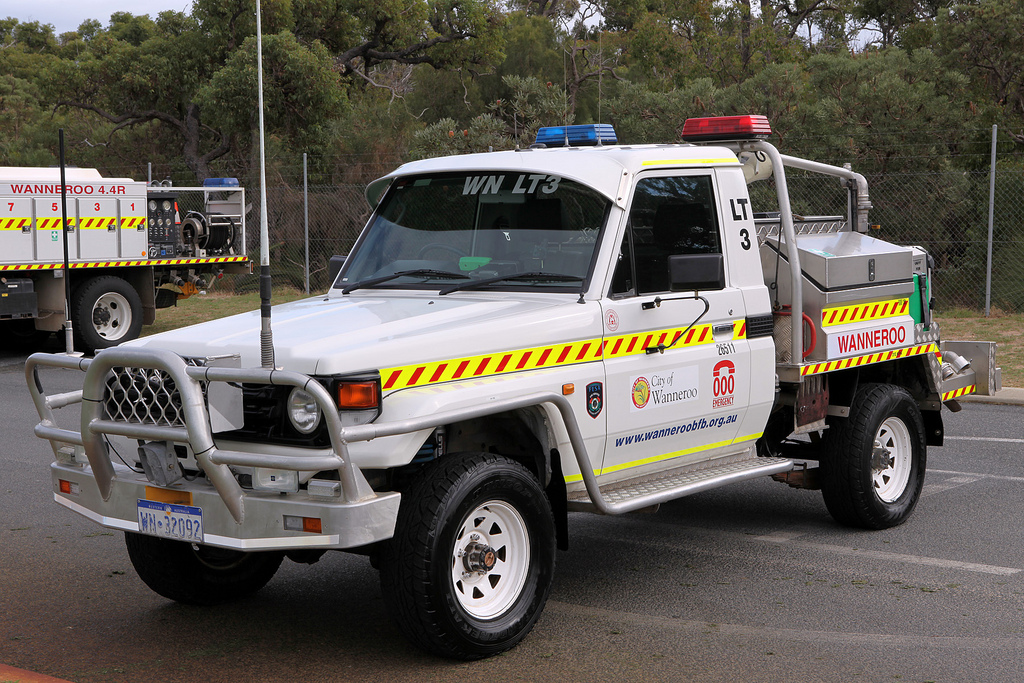
Bush Fire Service Light tanker (Wanneroo Central LT3)

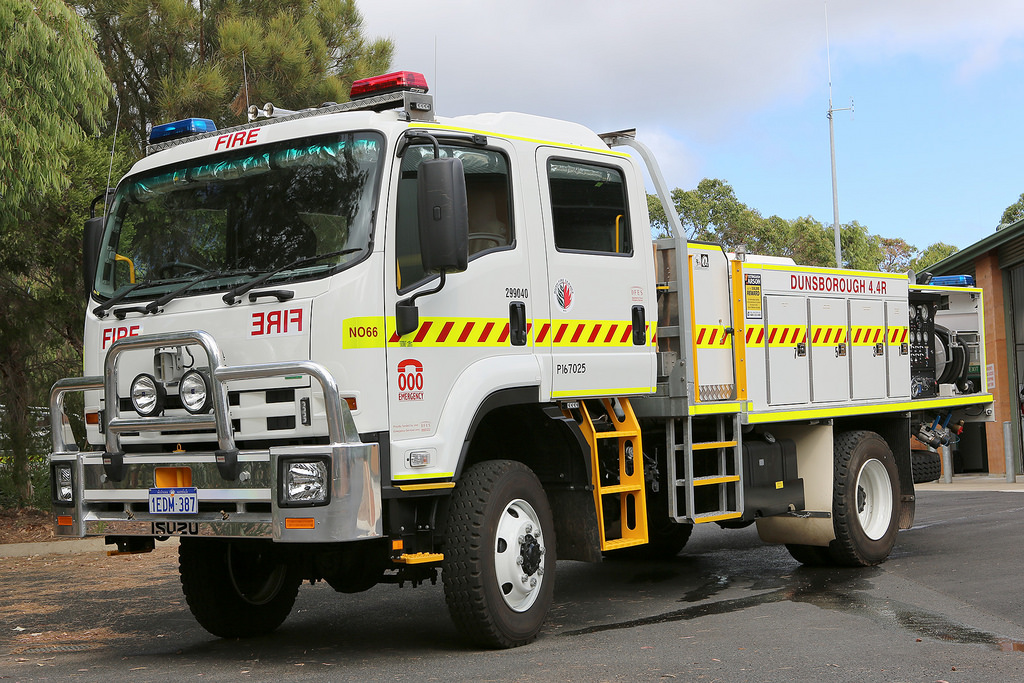
Bush Fire Service Isuzu 4.4 rural tanker (Dunsborough 4.4R)

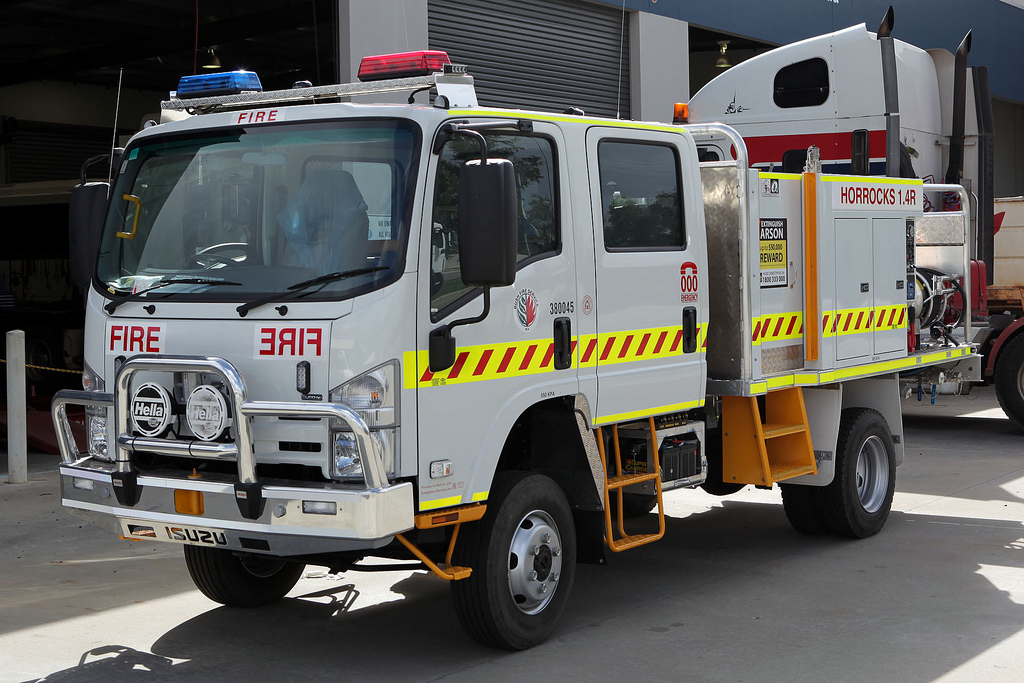
Bush Fire Service Isuzu 1.4 rural tanker (Horrocks 1.4R)

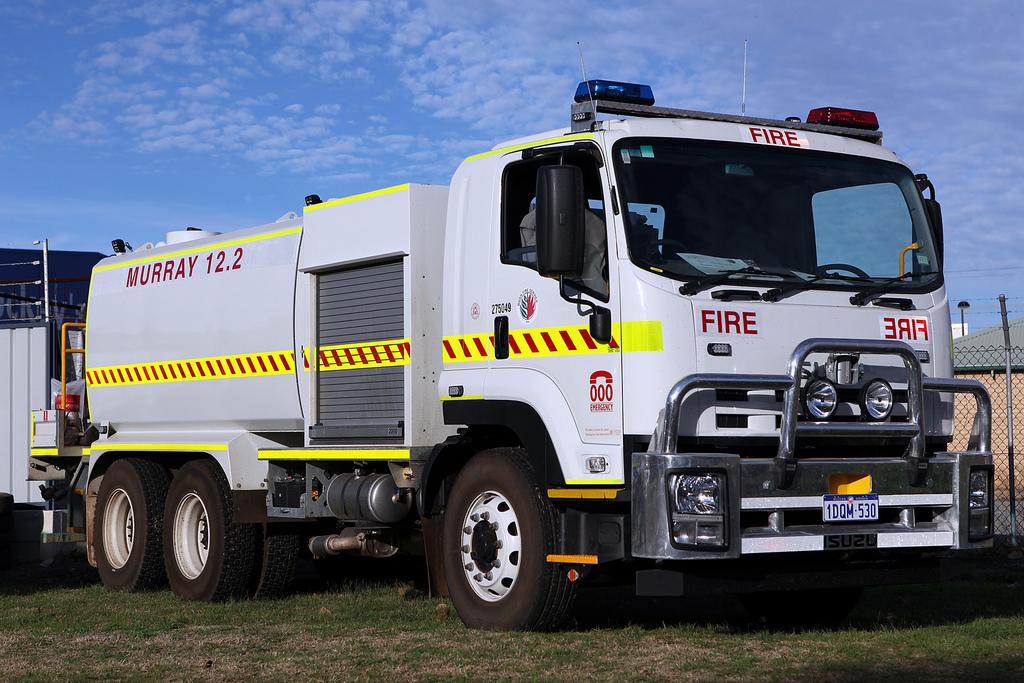
Isuzu 12.2 bulk water tanker (Murray 12.2)

== Incidents ==
In February 2023, a Coulson Aviation Boeing 737-300 crashed while fighting fires in the Fitzgerald River National Park; both pilots survived the crash.

== See also ==
- National Council for Fire & Emergency Services
