= 2016 Waroona–Yarloop bushfire =

Bushfire in Peel and South West regions of Western Australia

- Date: 5 January – 22 January
- Location: Shire of Harvey; Shire of Waroona
- Coordinates: 32°53′24″S 116°11′24″E; 32°53′24″S 116°10′12″E (approximate ignition point)

Statistics
- Burned area: 70,000 hectares (170,000 acres)

Impacts
- Deaths: 2
- Injuries: 5
- Structures lost: 181 with 166 in Yarloop

The 2016 Waroona–Yarloop bushfire started in the east in the forests of the Darling Scarp before reaching the Swan Coastal Plain and continued westwards until it reached the Indian Ocean. It started as a lightning strike that caused two fires in the Lane Poole Reserve state forest near Dwellingup, Western Australia on 5 January 2016 and then burnt close to Waroona and then through the historical town of Yarloop, destroying it, before continuing southwards towards the outskirts of the town of Harvey and westwards to Preston Beach. Around 70,000 ha (170,000 acres) of land was burnt, two people died and at least 166 buildings were destroyed in Yarloop alone with only ninety buildings surviving. In total 181 buildings and structures were lost with the total cost of fighting the fire and the cost of the damage and the loss resulting estimated at $155 million.

== Introduction ==
It was reported by the Bureau of Meteorology that during 2015, the rainfall was well below average in the region. Rainfall was 10% lower than expected and was following a trend of lower rainfalls in the region for the last forty years. 2015 was also warmer with Dwellingup recording its warmest summer in 75 years and the forest fuel loads around the source of the fire were said to be the driest in 25 years. Combined with these fuel loads, the Department of Parks and Wildlife's (P&W) yearly fuel reduction targets via burnoffs had not been achieved over the previous twelve years though it had made improvements in targets in the last 4 years.

== Timescale ==
=== 5 January ===
The Bureau of Meteorology data shows that there were lightning strikes in Lane Poole Reserve, a state forest of jarrah and marri, between 18:00 and 20:00 on Tuesday. The later inquiry concluded that this was the source of the fire that was reported early the next day and consisted of two fires.

=== 6 January ===
The fire was first reported at 07:26 on Wednesday morning, its cause reported as a lightning strike in Lane Poole Reserve, near Dwellingup. It had been detected earlier by a P&W officer who had checked the Sentinel Hotspots website on his computer around 06:30. By 08:30, the P&W officer was at the fire site and resources sent to their location. A bush fire advice warning for the fire was issued at 08:50. Later it was reported that it had grown to an 8 ha (20 acres) scrub fire when a P&W spotter plane overflew the site. The second fire was tackled first as it would have endangered crews fighting the first if it got out of control. It was extinguished by 11:45. The first fire was then tackled but the effort was hampered by heavy fuel loads, poor access, steep terrain and mining leases.

By 12:00 the fire was 800m east of the Murray River and the firefighters attempted use that barrier as means to containing it. But by 13:45, the fire jumped river and the barrier strategy ended. It was reported that at 13:30, the fire had grown to 160 ha (400 acres) and by 15:30, the Alcoa's mine leases and rehabilitation forests were burning and property owners between the fire and the town Waroona were warned. At 17:00 the fire was reported to at 2,200 ha (5,400 acres) and moving slowly at 1.5 to 2km/h. Ash from the fire had begun to fall over the town of Waroona around 18:00. Two hours later, it had increased to 2,800 ha (6,900 acres) and was now 13 km (8.1 mi) from the town of Waroona. Waroona soon came under ember attack and more units were sent to the town but the fire appeared west of the South West Highway as it left the hills and entered the coastal plain and farmlands. These new fires were probably started by lightning and pyro-cumulonimbus cloud over the original fire with main fire still far away.

The fire would pass Waroona to the south of the town and into the western farmlands via the Waroona Main Drain, around 21:30, which acted as a fuse due to the fuel load along the banks of this drain, as well the contours of the terrain and the convergence of two streams. Later in the evening, the fire was upgraded to an emergency level and the first emergency alerts were issued to residents in Waroona and east of the town at 22.25 instructing the residents either to flee their homes or stay and defend them.

That night, eight campers were trapped in the forest at Lake Navarino and firefighters were sent to rescue them but were trapped themselves with the campers for one and a half hours. The first injuries from firefighters were received. Three were injured fighting the fire. Two firefighters received minor burns when a paddock fire got out of control and when attempting to flee their vehicle became stuck and fire overran them. They and two others had to escape on foot into a burnt-out area to escape the inferno. One was later evacuated by air ambulance to Peel Health Campus with burns to his back. At 22:30, the first evacuation centre had been opened at Pinjarra. Just before midnight, the fire was reported 1 km (0.62 mi) from Waroona and a report later at midnight stated the fire had travelled 35 km (22 mi) from the ignition point and had burnt out 12,000 ha (30,000 acres).

=== 7 January ===
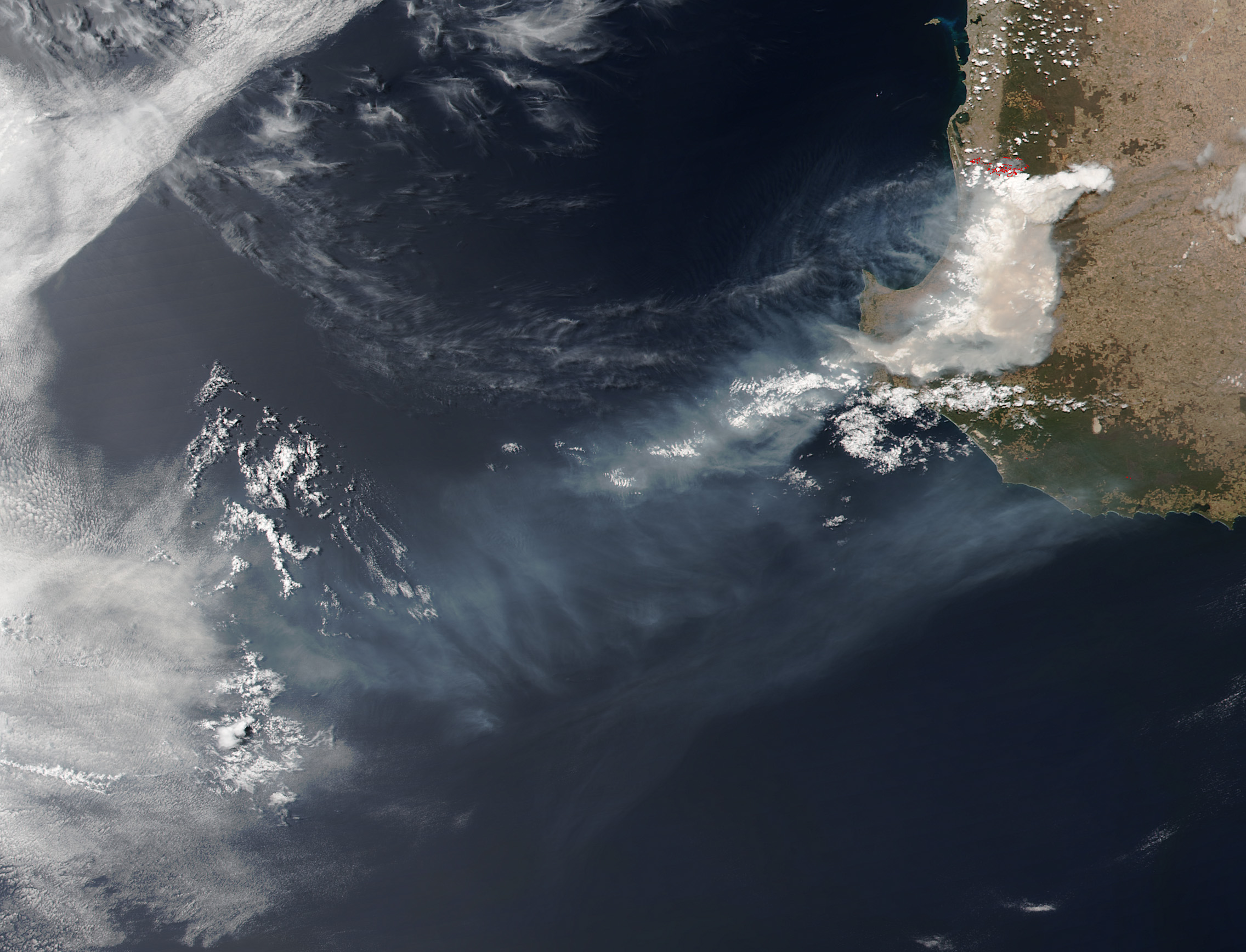
NASA Visible Infrared Imaging Radiometer Suite (VIIRS) on the Suomi NPP satellite acquired this image of the Waroona fire - 7 January

The northern edge of the fire was now reported moving towards Dwellingup and Pinjarra while the southern edge was reported moving towards Harvey, Hamel and Waroona mainly due to wind direction being a north-easterly. Places declared as emergency areas include Waroona, Preston Beach and Harvey and surrounding areas. At 02:00, the fire to the east of Waroona slowed as it burnt younger vegetation.

During the day, temperatures were said to have reached 40 °C (104 °F) degrees, with 80 km/h (50 mph) wind gusts reported in the fire area that made the creation of containment areas difficult. The perimeter of the fire was now estimated to be around 113 km (70 mi). The fire could not be scaled properly from the air due to thick smoke. The fire front was reported to be 40 km (25 mi) wide. During the day, a Pyrocumulonimbus cloud formed over the fire area and could be seen from space as well as 118 km (73 mi) away in Perth, but only lasted an hour.

By Thursday afternoon, damage received to this point was described as property, livestock and one home with 29,000 ha (72,000 acres) burnt. Ash was now reported falling in Bunbury. At this point, 200 firefighters, 23 appliances, 5 dozers and water bombers were being used to fight the fire.

By evening, sixty people had sought shelter at the Pinjarra emergency evacuation centre while another fifty people sought shelter at the Australind evacuation centre. The Southbound Festival in Busselton was called off at 20:30pm by promoter David Chitty after consultation with emergency authorities when 15,000 people were expected to arrive in the region.

==== Harvey ====
At 06.30 an emergency evacuation centre had opened in Harvey but was then closed at 12:30 and one at Australind opened as by 13:30, Harvey was now bushfire alert. Patients were evacuated from the Harvey Hospital after it was closed and they were moved to other hospitals.

==== Preston Beach ====
Smoke and ash had begun raining down on Preston Beach on Wednesday night, with heavy winds, and by 03:00, an evacuation point was set up at the beach carpark. By morning, residents and holidaymakers faced evacuation from the beach at Preston Beach. Some were forced to stay on the beach, while others evacuated to Mandurah by boat. Other evacuees who could, were ordered by authorities to drive south. A smoke cloud could now be seen as far as Perth, 50 km (31 mi) away.

==== Roads ====
Parts of Forrest Highway were closed from 02:00 and South Western Highway later that evening to protect drivers and firefighters from injury. The reason the South Western Highway was closed to traffic was that the Samson Brook bridge, south of Waroona, had been destroyed by fire. Firefighters fought to keep the Forrest Highway protected so it could be opened sooner if the South Western Highway remained closed for longer. Roads around Waroona were expected to be closed around three to five days. Incident controllers at the Department of Parks and Wildlife said the Forrest Highway would probably open up first due to a bridge down on the South Western Highway. Main Roads WA said it would attempt to build an alternative route around the bridge but the area would need accessing and a decision would take a week. Albany Highway and Coalfields Highway remained open.

==== Waroona, Hamel and Wagerup ====
Later in the day, fire units were now sent to protect the Yarloop townsite and Alcoa's Wagerup refinery. Firefighters responded to fire reports south of Waroona and close to Hamel with 80 km/h (50 mph) winds and 3m high flames. An hour later the fire reached Hamel while to the west the fire was predicted to reach the Forrest Highway in a few hours and so parts are closed. By 08:00 the fire enters Hamel and an hour later, the fire was heading towards the Wagerup refinery northeast of Yarloop and fire crews were sent there soon afterwards and spend the rest of the morning fighting the blaze in the area. The plant loses power mid-afternoon and by 19:00 the refinery's gas plant was under threat.

==== Yarloop ====
Around 08:00, fire units were sent east of Yarloop to fight the fires as they advance westward. By 11:00, spot fires could be seen north-east of Yarloop close to Wagerup refinery and so more units were sent to Yarloop. The Water Corporation asked around 13:00 that generators be brought into Yarloop to get the water pumps running, a second request for the day, but the idea was rejected by fire officials. In Yarloop, residents reported that water and power were lost between 14:00 and 15:00. The tanks had been drain by residents preparing their properties for the fire. By 15:00, the fire was reported to be 3 km (1.9 mi) north and 5 km (3.1 mi) east of Yarloop and more units were brought in to slow the fire east of the town. These units attempted to protect Yarloop by constructing an earth break along existing a powerline servitude east of the town. Water Corporation announced at 17:00 there was no longer water in Yarloop and requested water be tanked in. The Harvey Shire Fire Controller asked for more units to be sent to Yarloop in the afternoon but his calls went unheeded and by 18:00 the units east of the town who were trying to build the earth firebreak retreated from the fire which has become dangerous and was now 1-2km away from the South Western Highway close to the town itself. Hot easterly winds at 80 km/h (50 mph) appear suddenly and begin to blow embers over the town around 19:20 and 15 minutes later an emergency warning was issued by authorities that names the town itself under threat. By 19:30, the fire had reached the outskirts of the town via ember attacks and spot fires and the remaining residents, around 200 people, evacuated to the oval. The Harvey Shire Fire Controller again asked for more units to fight the fire at the town and this time units were allocated and sent. By 8.30pm the South Western Highway had been crossed by fire as it headed for Yarloop with 50m high flames and winds at 46kmh winds reported with urgent requests sent for more fire units as the structures in the town were on fire. After the water supply was lost from the morning in Yarloop, irrigation water from Harvey was rerouted to the oval and sprinklers used to keep people on the oval wet. The firefighter's in town, overwhelmed by the fire and with the lack of available water, remained on the oval too and when the fire had passed, began to mop up the remaining fires. As units arrived they attempted to fight the fires with minimal water and by 21:40 the town was fully ablaze. Just before midnight, the Yarloop fire was now 4 km (2.5 mi) southwest of the town. Historical buildings lost to the fire in the town included the Yarloop Town Hall built in 1938, the old Yarloop Hospital, the Yarloop Hotel, and the Yarloop Workshops and Steam Museum which was 115 years old. The curator of that museum, Geoff Fortune, estimated $12 million of damage to the old boilers and engineering machines as well as steam and diesel locomotives. Other historical buildings destroyed include the old mill boarding house, hotel, first post office and timber workers' cottages.

=== 8 January ===
By Friday, the fire had now covered 62,000 ha (150,000 acres) and had a 222 km (138 mi) perimeter. 200 firefighters, 50 appliances including 38 heavy machines were involved in fighting the fire. 835 people were housed at evacuation centres in Australind and Pinjarra. Emergency areas now included Waroona, Harvey, Hamel, Cookernup, Yarloop, Myalup, Preston Beach and Lake Clifton. Power outages affected 3,900 customers. Temperatures were lower this day and wind changes on the southern boundary was of concern for communities in Cookernup, Harvey and Myalup. Early reports from the Thursday fire in Yarloop saw 95 homes reported as destroyed by DFES Commissioner Wayne Gregson with the remaining residents in the town evacuated to Pinjarra and Australind. Three people who were reported missing were accounted for. Meanwhile, Emergency Services Minister Joe Francis claimed everything that could be done, was done to save the town of Yarloop. WA Acting Premier Kim Hames announced a $3,000 sum in disaster relief assistance for those people whose homes had been destroyed and $1,000 for damaged homes. Sixty-eight firefighters were said to be on their way from the Eastern States. The Insurance Commission of Australia was predicting tens of millions of dollars damage.

At the western end of the fire, it was reported around 02:00 that the fire had jumped the Forrest Highway near Myalup and a short while later fire teams were sent to Lake Clifton with fire well alight by 03:30. By 13:45pm, Myalup was under emergency warning. Evacuation of remaining residents in Yarloop to Pinjarra was planned for the early afternoon with buses brought in for those requiring them. At the same time, lightning strikes appear to the west of Waroona. At Preston Beach, where people remained on the beach, and who hadn't left earlier or evacuated by boats, food and water were dropped by air around 14:00 and delivered to the general store. Soon after, a fire was reported around 14:07 close to the Cookernup area south of Yarloop. At Lake Preston, fire breaks were placed by firefighter by the late afternoon. Around 19:00, evacuees on Clifton Beach were told they could return to their homes. The fire close reported earlier in the day around Cookernup was reported at 20:00 to have burnt around the town. In the southern end of the fire, the fire was reported by 23:00 to be about five kilometres from Harvey.

=== 9 January ===
At 01:30 Saturday, the fire was reported still moving towards Harvey but had slowed. Parts of Forrest Highway, Old Coast Road and the South Western Highway remained closed. By 06:30, the damage loss at Yarloop was now increased to 121 homes and 10 structures. The fire was said to have burnt through 70,000 ha (170,000 acres) and had a 222km perimeter with 250 firefighters now tackling the fires with the emergency areas being areas east Waroona, Hamel, Cookernup and Yarloop. Preston Beach's warning was downgraded at 04:50 to a watch and act alert. Around 10.30am, WA Premier Colin Barnett visited the evacuation centre at Pinjarra and announced a contribution of $1million to the Lord Mayor's Disaster Relief Fund, while at the same time, the Perth Lord Mayor announced the opening of the relief fund.

The WA Police announced a half-hour later that three people had been reported missing in Yarloop. By 13.30pm, the town of Harvey had now been declared under an emergency alert. People continued to leave Harvey as the fire headed towards it and Cookernup and Hamel. The fire was fanned by north-easterly winds towards the eastern outskirts of Harvey. These would be downgraded to spot fires around 16:32. Sixty NSW firefighters had now arrived in the region as had brigades from other parts of WA to relieve the firefighters on the ground. Early evening saw the WA Police announce that two bodies had been recovered from homes in Yarloop. They were later reported as Malcolm Taylor, 73 and Leslie Owen Taylor 77, while one person was still missing.

Criticism of how DFES had managed the fire at the town of Yarloop now began to be reported on social media. Fire Commissioner Wayne Gregson had to defend the role of his department DFES, the Department of Parks and Wildlife, local government and career and volunteer firefighters. Yarloop Volunteer Bushfire Brigade criticised DFES in a Facebook post saying DFES had not posted a fire warning for Yarloop until an hour after the blaze went through, a statement backed by Harvey Shire chief bushfire control officer Phil Penny. DFES countered by saying that at 12:10 Thursday an emergency warning was issued for Waroona and Harvey and surrounding areas in those shires and 07.35pm specifically named towns of Wagerup, Yarloop and Cookernup.

Reports were being received of dairy farmers dumping milk as they had been blocked by road closures from getting into the emergency area since Thursday to make deliveries to Harvey Fresh in Harvey.

=== 10 January ===
On Sunday 10 January, the Water Corporation was allowed into Yarloop and public tap stations were established but no other repair work can be performed. Music groups from the cancelled Southbound festival, Disclosure, Bloc Party and Birds of Tokyo played a bushfire benefit concert at the HBF Stadium, Mt Claremont with all proceeds from the attendance going to the bushfire appeal while VenuesWest, the venue owner, waived its hire fees.

=== 11 January ===
The emergency warning for the town of Waroona is lifted. Residents of Yarloop were escorted fire authorities to view their properties. People evacuated from the fire area started to become frustrated with authorities as roadblocks prevented them returning to view properties or feed their livestock with some vowing to bypass the roadblocks by any means. DFES Commissioner Wayne Gregson stated that NSW fire authorities had made an offer of a DC-10 and a C-130 fire bombers to fight the fire but had turned down the offer. He did not believe they would have made a difference operationally in fighting the fire.

=== 12 January ===
The Forrest Highway was opened on Tuesday for all traffic from 06:25. Harvey Fresh announced that its trucks would be allowed through to dairy farmers as prior to this date, farmers had been forced to dump tens of thousands of litres of milk. Livestock farmers began to break the law to get to properties to feed or truck-out cattle on burnt out properties as permits were slow in being issued. Emergency Services Minister Joe Francis continued to defend the actions of the firefighters as did Lea Anderson secretary United Firefighters Union of WA who defended the firefighter at Yarloop, who with low water supplies protected the remaining people on the oval. Francis also mention that an inquiry into the fire would be carried out. The Federal Government's disaster recovery allowance would be available to workers of businesses who lost income and could cover up to thirteen weeks income. Alcoa, who lost 80 houses it owned in Yarloop said at the time it was too early to make a decision as to whether they would rebuild the houses, most of which had been rented out.

=== 13 January ===
Wednesday saw the fire jump containment lines and a watch and act alert was issued again for residents around Waroona and Cookernup. Five truckloads of donate hay was delivered to the fire ravaged area so farmers could feed their livestock. 1,000 power poles had been damaged by the fire and it was estimated that it would cost $7-10 million to replace them.

== Aftermath ==
On 20 January, the Water Corporation installed generators to pump water to their water tanks and by 25 January, water was fully restored to the remaining properties in the town. By 19 January 2016, Western Powers repair bill reached $26 million and in addition to 1,000 power poles, now included 44 transformers and more the 50 km (31 mi) of powerlines.

The WA Premier Colin Barnett visited the town of Yarloop on 20 January 2016 and spoke to the town's locals at the bowling club. He announced that Euan Ferguson, former Country Fire Authority boss in Victoria and South Australia would investigate the cause and effect of the fire which was promised to take two to three months while the recovery and reconstruction effort would be managed by Main Roads Commissioner Ken Michael.

== Inquiry and recommendations ==
On 20 June 2016, Euan Ferguson briefed the WA Cabinet about his two-volume report into the Waroona–Yarloop fire. The report was to be released in Harvey on 23 June 2016, was described as contentious and frank by Premier Barnett saying it while it wasn't judgmental it did constructive long-term recommendations.

The report stated that the fire started as a lightning strike in Lane Poole Reserve National Park. The report mentioned that FESA was late in specifically mentioning Yarloop in its alerts; the need to manage the whereabouts of the location of fire trucks better and fatigue levels in fire crews. The fuels loads in the south-western region were described as frightening. Ferguson also recommended the split of emergency services with a rural fire service being set up separate from FESA's metropolitan services.

== Rebuilding ==
In August 2017, work on the new Yarloop fire station, built on the old site, was begun with funding of $935,729 from the Shire of Harvey and additional funding to be provided by FESA.

By 2018, Yarloop's rebuilding was underway, though the town's population had dropped from 395 in 2016 to 120 in 2018. The Shire of Harvey had issued building permits for 30 new houses and a Yarloop Town Development Plan had been adopted with a town committee to ensure the town's population had input into the rebuilds. Heritage site rebuilds were also on the plan. A new Town Hall was planned and the new fire brigade station was officially opened in May 2018. Yarloop Primary School, though not burnt down reopened in January 2017.
