= Harvey railway station =

Harvey railway station may refer to:

- Harvey station (British Columbia), Canada
- Harvey station (Illinois), United States
- Harvey railway station, Western Australia

== See also ==
- Harvey, New Brunswick, Canada, also called Harvey Station
