= 2010–11 Australian bushfire season =

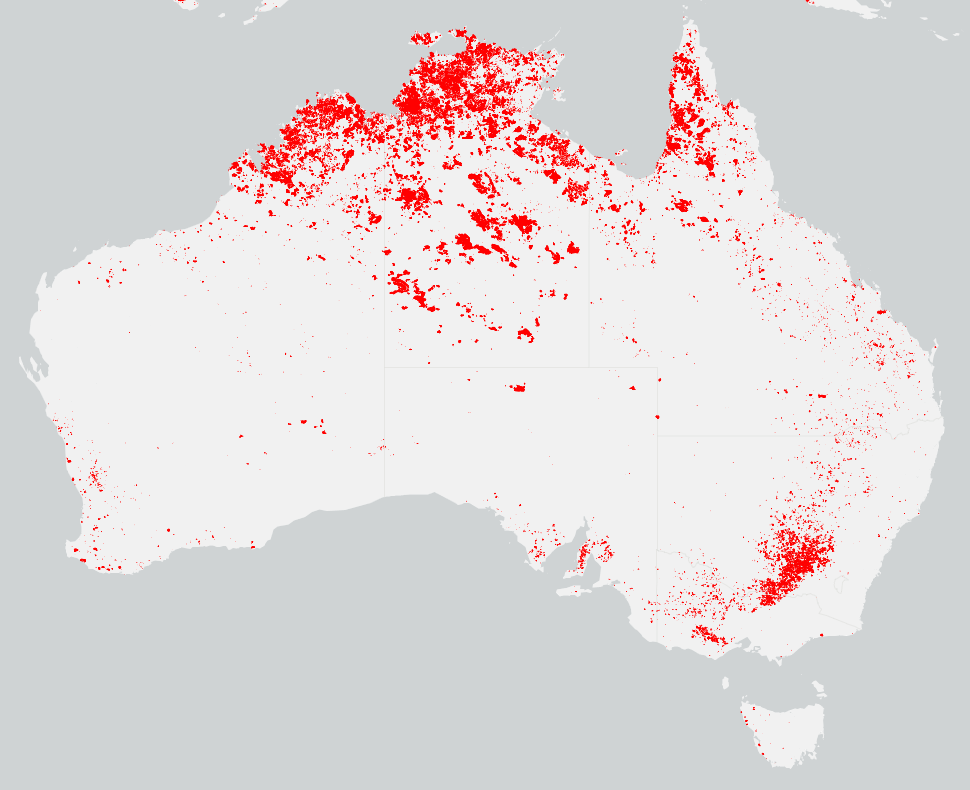
- NASA MODIS burned area detections from June 2010 to May 2011
- Date: Winter (June) 2010 – Autumn (May) 2011
- Location: Australia

Impacts
- Structures destroyed: 90+ total: 84 houses; several non-residential structures

During the summer of 2010–11, a relative lack of bushfires occurred along Eastern Australia due to a very strong La Niña effect, which instead contributed to severe flooding, in particular the 2010–11 Queensland floods and the 2011 Victorian floods. As a result of these weather patterns, most major fire events took place in Western Australia and South Australia. Some later significant fire activity occurred in Gippsland in eastern Victoria, an area which largely missed the rainfall that lead to the flooding in other parts of the state.

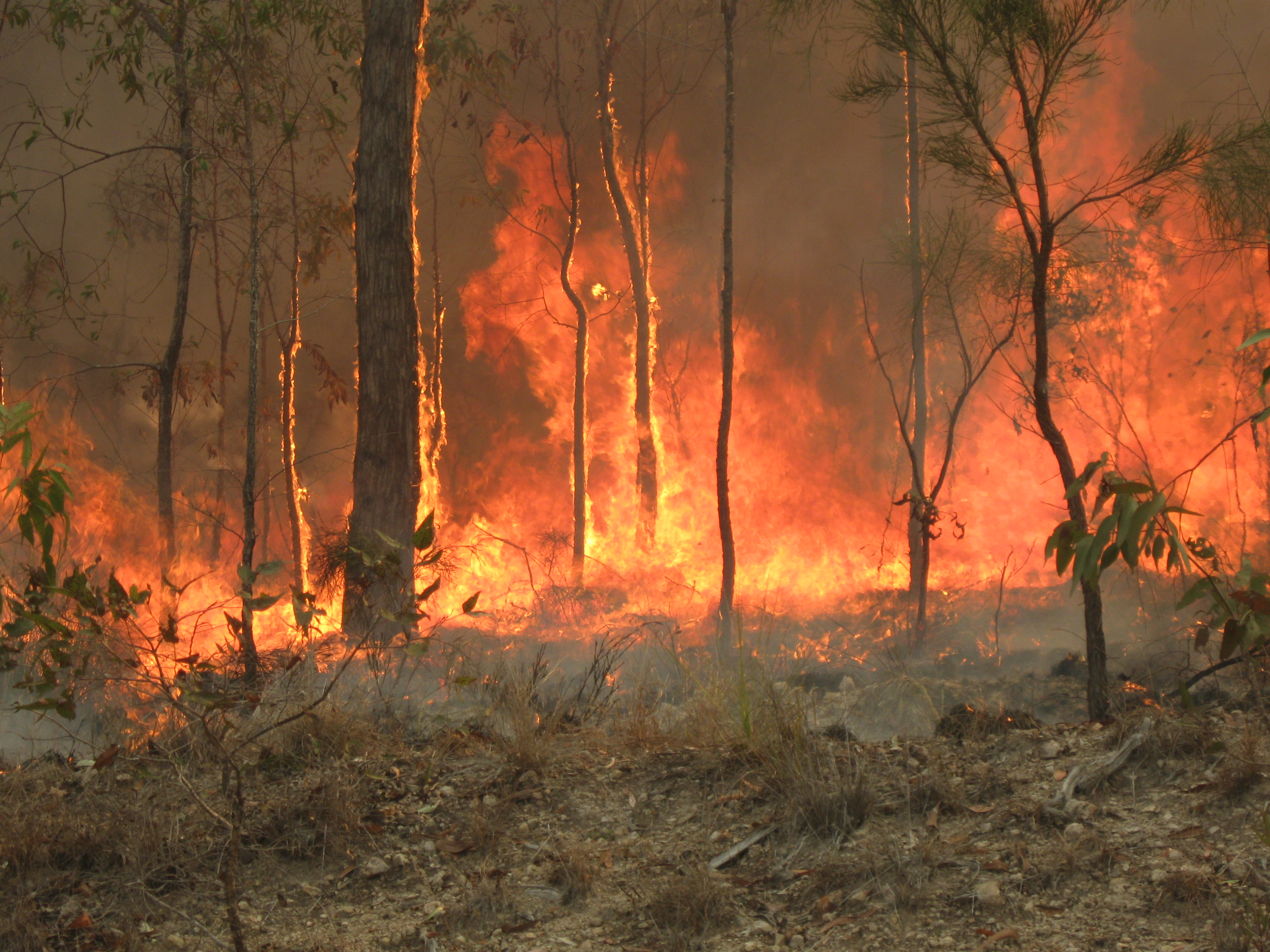
Bush fire at Captain Creek, Queensland 2010

== September ==
WA

On 24 September 2010, a fire started west Walpole at the Boronia Ridge sub-division. The fire moved east toward the town and burned through the thick coastal scrub near the Walpole Inlet making access difficult for fire crews. The Department of Fire & Emergency Services issued bushfire advice to residents of the surrounding areas. The fire was contained by the following day and 23 hectares of bushland was burnt out with no loss of homes.

== November ==
WA

On 30 November 2010, a fire began about 50 km south of Perth near the suburb of Karnup leading to FESA issuing an emergency warning for residents to take shelter and defend their homes on 1 December. By 2 December the fire had burnt through 350 hectares (860 acres) but had claimed no homes, and was brought under control by over one hundred firefighters.

== January ==
WA

On 10 January 2011, a fire began about 30 km south of Mandurah, near the suburb of Lake Clifton, leading to FESA issuing an emergency warning for residents to evacuate or to defend their homes on 10 January. A shed was burnt and flames were reported to be as high as a two-storey building. By 12 January ten homes had been destroyed and the fire had burnt an area of approximately 2000ha, the fire was deliberately lit with investigators identifying nine ignition points.

Another fire occurred south of Perth, North East of Parmelia on 19 January 2011 and burnt an area of 45 hectares. Challenger Avenue, between Warner Road and Parmelia Avenue were closed while up to 90 fire-fighters tackled the blaze. Another fire near the neighbouring suburb of Bertram was also contained. Both fires were thought to have been deliberately lit.

== February ==
Vic

On 1 February 2011, a combination of high temperatures and strong winds led to the outbreak of several fires in the Gippsland region of Victoria. While most were relatively small and quickly contained, the worst of the fires, the Tostaree bushfires, spread rapidly, burning 8,000 hectares (20,000 acres) of thinly populated State forest, grassland, and farmland near the Princes Highway between Nowa Nowa and Newmerella, just west of Orbost. The fires quickly destroyed two houses (with several other houses being saved by fire crews), cut power to most of East Gippsland east of Nowa Nowa for several days, and caused the Princes Highway to be closed for almost two days, effectively isolating the region. The firefighting effort included two hundred Country Fire Authority firefighters, seven aircraft, and the Elvis air crane. Early speculation was that the fire had been started by clashing or fallen power lines caused by the strong winds. Milder weather conditions allowed the fire to be largely contained by 3 February, and the Princes Highway was reopened with a reduced speed limit. Further investigations suggested the fire had been started by smouldering tree roots from a lightning strike months earlier.

WA

On the night of 5 February 2011 a fire began to the east of Swan Valley when a tree branch fell on an electrical transmission tower, resulting in hundreds of people being evacuated. By 7 February the fire had burnt through 1,167 hectares (2,884 acres) with 150 firefighters tackling the blaze. The high winds resulted in all fixed wing water bombers being grounded, but five helicopters (four helitankers and one large type 1 helicopter) were used to combat the blaze.

At about midday 6 February a fire began in the south eastern suburbs of Perth, Western Australia in the Perth Hills. By the next day hundreds of residents were evacuated from the suburbs of Roleystone and Kelmscott as firefighters battled to contain the blaze. At an early stage of the fire at least eight homes were lost and over 300 hectares (741 acres) of bush had been destroyed. By the end of daylight on the same day the number was raised to 35 homes lost. By late afternoon of 7 February the fire had destroyed 64 homes, with 32 more damaged, and was 95 percent contained with more than 100 firefighters still tackling the blaze. A total area of 440 hectares (1,087 acres) was burnt out by the blaze, which is believed to have been started by sparks from an angle grinder igniting dry grass.

On 6 February additional bushfires were burning in the Perth suburbs of Ferndale and Wilson in bushland adjoining the Canning River. Outside of Perth there were three additional fires burning in Chittering Estate, Jarrahdale, and in the Lesueur National Park. On 6 February the Victorian Government sent 21 specialist firefighters along with two helitankers, with an additional two helitankers due to arrive on 8 February.

== Fires of note ==
State	Start date	Deaths	Injuries	Houses lost	Area (ha)	Local govt.	Impacted communities & destruction	Duration	Ref.
WA	10 January 2011			10	2,000 ha (4,900 acres)	Waroona	Armstrong Hills, Lake Clifton & South Herron: 15 vehicles and several non-residential structures destroyed	2 days	
Vic	1 February 2011			2	7,500 ha (19,000 acres)	East Gippsland	Wombat Creek & Tostaree: A machinery shed destroyed	2 days	
WA	6 February 2011		15	71	440 ha (1,100 acres)	Armadale	Brigadoon, Clifton Hills, Kelmscott & Roleystone: 40 vehicles and numerous more non-residential structures destroyed; 39 houses damaged	15 days	
WA	5 April 2011			1	1 ha (2.5 acres)	Cockburn	Coolbellup: 4 houses damaged		
