= Yarloop Workshops =

Railway and timber mill machinery workshop in Western Australia

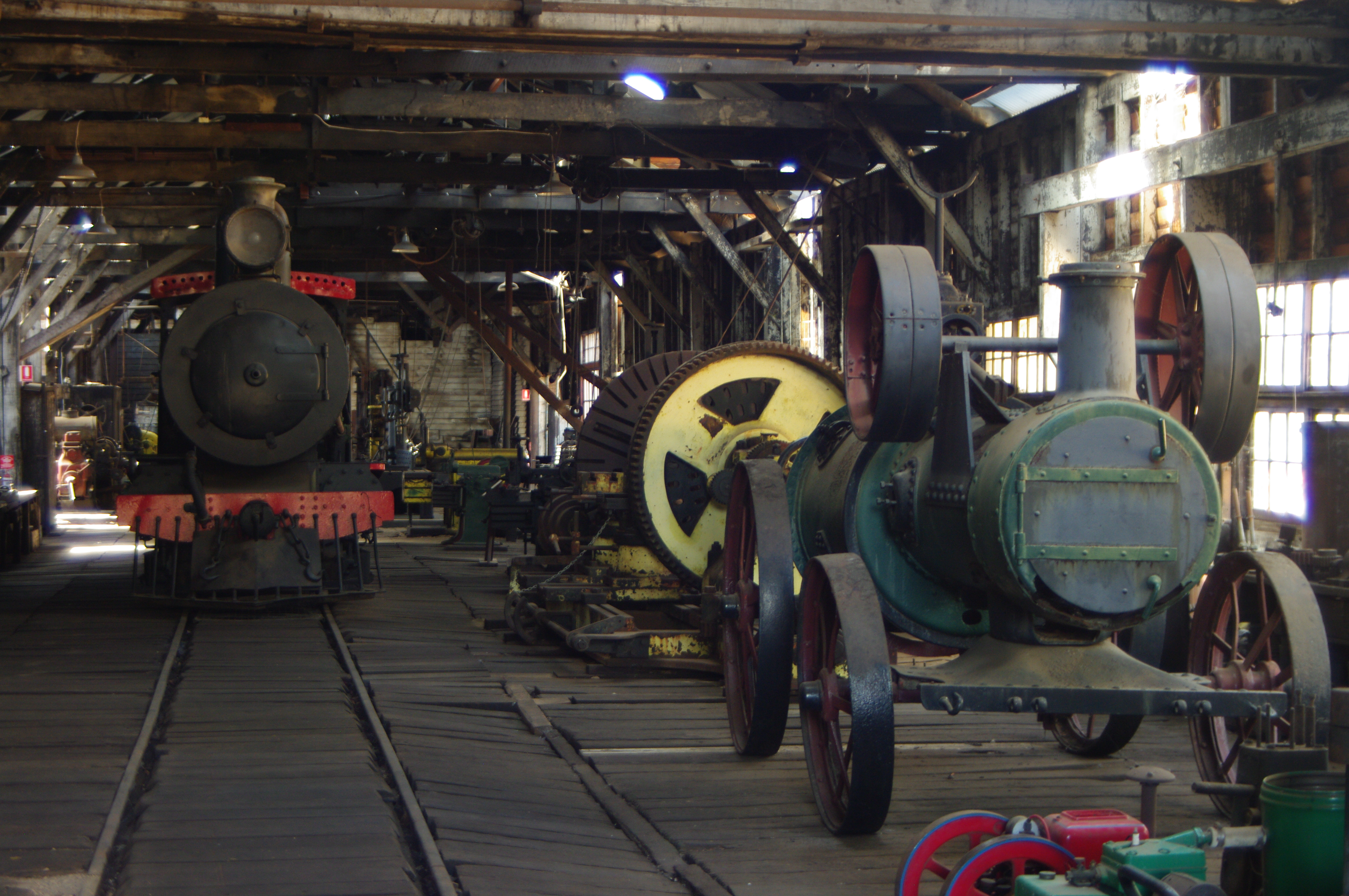
- Inside the main workshop, major features of the image are a self-propelled steam tractor, a steam locomotive, and wheel lathe

- Location within Western Australia
- Location: Yarloop, Western Australia, Western Australia
- Coordinates: 32.96°S 115.9°E
- Defunct

Western Australia Heritage Register
- Designated: 12 May 2000
- Reference no.: 1203

The Yarloop Workshops was a railway and timber mill machinery workshop, situated in the town of Yarloop, Western Australia.

The workshops operated from 1901 to 1978. Originally built by Charles and Edwin Millar on the site of the first timber mill in the area, the operations expanded to become the support facility for Millars Karri and Jarrah Forests Limited's 26 timber mills and the rail network that connected them. The workshops hand-crafted most of the parts necessary to maintain the equipment rather than experience delays in obtaining parts from the United Kingdom. After suffering extensive damage from Cyclone Alby in 1978, Millars moved their operation to a site just outside the town on the South Western Highway. The site then changed ownership several times until it was bought by Bunnings in 1983.

== History ==
In 1895 the Millar brothers built a timber mill on the site and as production increased the need to maintain equipment meant that the place was expanded to incorporate the various machinery workshops until 1901 when the site's sole function was for the maintenance of Millars equipment. During both World War I and World War II the workshops were converted to manufacture armaments. In the 1930s the timber industry in the region peaked with Millars operating 26 sawmills and an extensive private railway system to support them. The workshops became the centre of the operations employing over 100 people. The workshops included a foundry making the parts as necessary; as part of this the largest collection of wooden patterns were made and are still retained on site in the workshops.

== 2016 fire ==
On 7 January 2016 the workshop, along with most of the townsite, was destroyed by the 2016 Waroona–Yarloop bushfire.

== Rebuilding ==
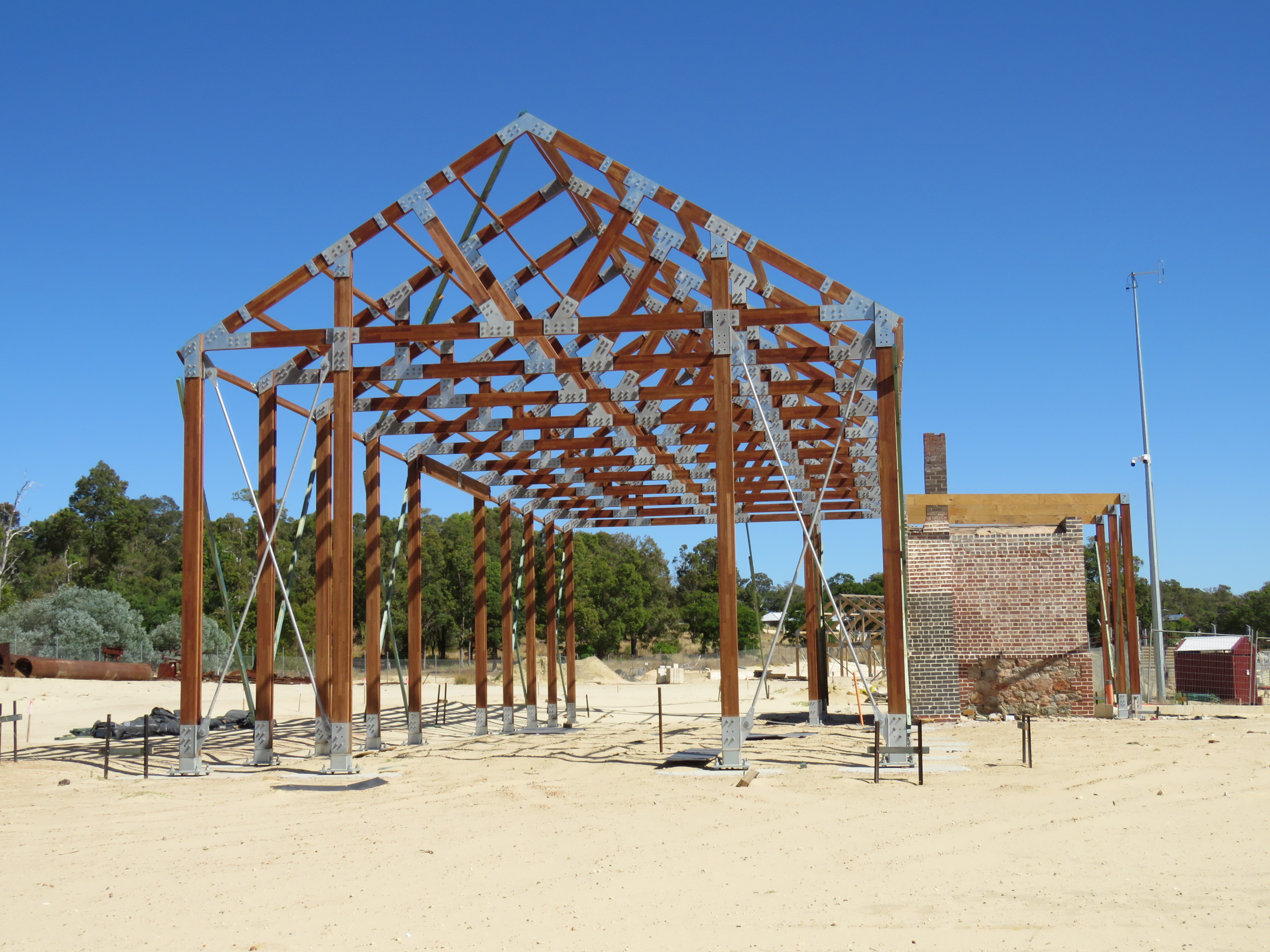
Rebuilding of the Yarloop Workshops in January 2023

In January 2022, it was announced that the workshops would be rebuilt, with the first stage focusing on rebuilding the steam workshops.
