= Kwinana =

Kwinana may refer to:

- City of Kwinana, a local government area in Western Australia
- Electoral district of Kwinana, an electorate of the Western Australian Legislative Assembly
- Kwinana Beach, Western Australia, a suburb in Western Australia
- Kwinana Desalination Plant
- Kwinana Freeway, a major road in Western Australia
- Kwinana Grain Terminal, a grain terminal in East Rockingham, Western Australia
- Kwinana Power Station, a coal power station
- Kwinana railway station, a station of the Mandurah Line
- Kwinana Town Centre, Western Australia, a suburb in Western Australia
- SS Kwinana, a ship that was driven ashore at Kwinana Beach in 1922

== See also ==
- Kiwiana
