= Harvey River =

River in Western Australia

Coordinates: 32°46′S 115°43′E

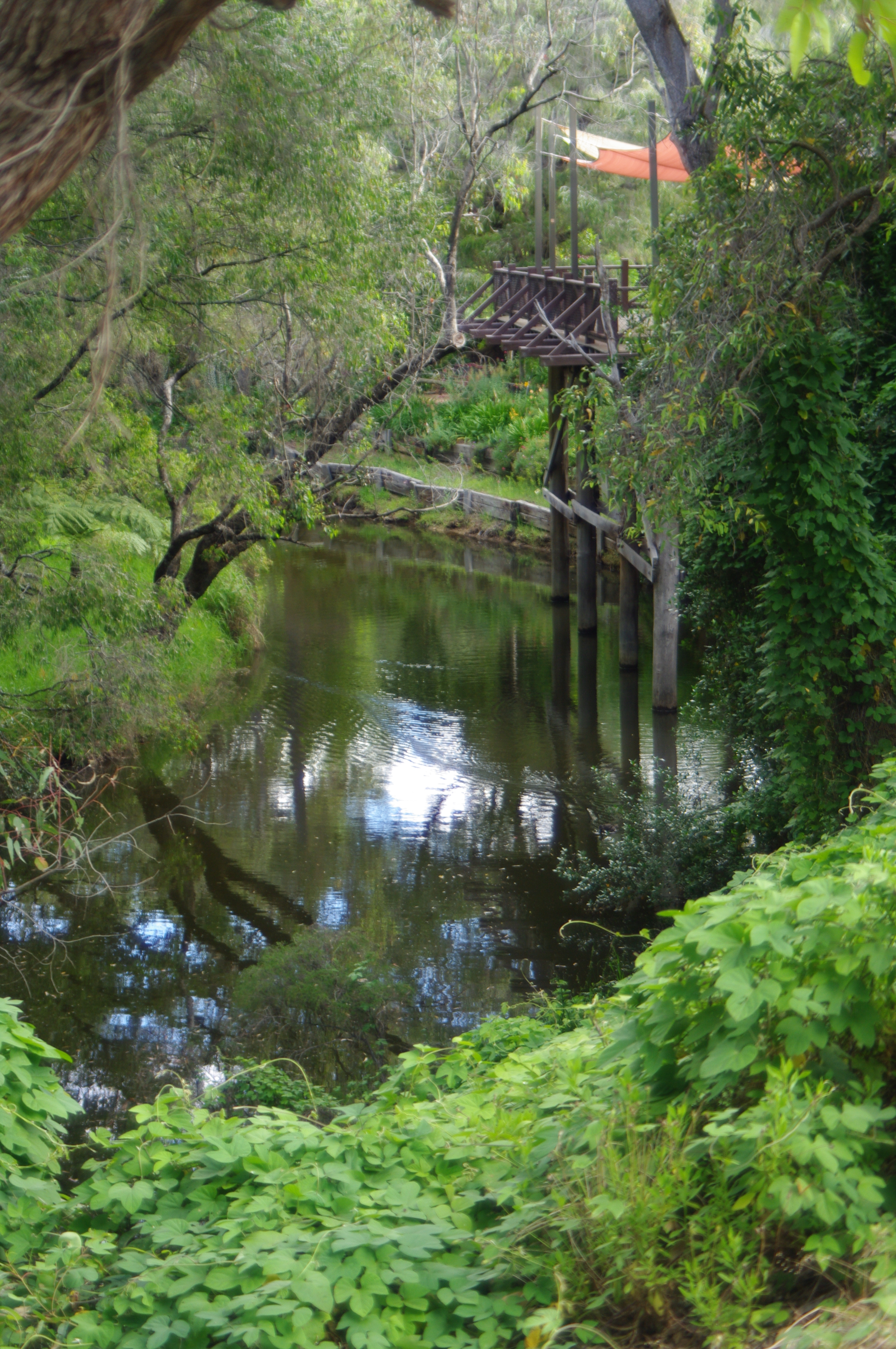
- Harvey River as passes below Stirling Cottage in Harvey

Location
- Country: Australia

Physical characteristics
- Source
  - location: Mount Keats
- Mouth
  - location: Peel-Harvey Estuary
- Length: 90 kilometres (56 mi)
- Basin size: 2,000 square kilometres (772 sq mi)
- Discharge
  - average: 4,426 ML/a (0.1403 m^{3}/s; 4.953 cu ft/s)

The Harvey River is a river in Western Australia and is the southernmost of the three major waterways which drain into the Peel-Harvey Estuary, with its delta in the southern extreme of the Harvey Estuary. It is about 90 km in length, rising near Mount Keats. Due to flooding of grazing land the river was diverted to discharge directly into the ocean in 1934.

The river's first recorded encounter was by Dr Alexander Collie and Lieutenant William Preston in an expedition in November 1829. It is presumed to have been named by Governor James Stirling after Rear Admiral Sir John Harvey, who in 1818 was Commander in Chief of the West Indies Station while Stirling had served in that region.
