= Harvey Senior High School =

Location
- Harvey, South West region, Western Australia; Australia; 33°5′1″S 115°54′27″E

Information
- Type: Public co-educational high day school
- Motto: Seek Truth
- Established: 1958; 68 years ago
- Principal: David Gault
- Enrolment: 211 (2021)
- Campus: Harvey
- Colours: Green and gold
- Website: www.harveyshs.wa.edu.au

Harvey Senior High School is a comprehensive public co-educational high day school, located in Harvey, a regional centre 140 kilometres (87 mi) south of Perth, Western Australia.

== Overview ==
The school was established in 1958 and by 2012 had an enrolment of 220 students between Year 8 and Year 12, approximately 8% of whom were Indigenous Australians.

The school operated as a junior high school from 1958 to 1962 when it moved from the present primary school site to the current site on the South Western Highway. The agricultural wing was split from the high school in 1998.

The current principal is David Gault, as of 2022.

Enrolment as of 2021 is 211.

== See also ==
- List of schools in rural Western Australia
