= Electoral results for the district of Collie-Preston =

Western Australian district election results

This is a list of electoral results for the electoral district of Collie-Preston in Western Australian state elections.

== Members for Collie ==
South-West Mining
Member	Party	Term
John Ewing	Ministerial	1901–1904
Collie
Ernest Henshaw	Labor	1904–1905
John Ewing	Ministerial	1905–1908
Arthur Wilson	Labor	1908–1947
Harry May	Labor	1947–1968
Tom Jones	Labor	1968–1989
Dr Hilda Turnbull	National	1989–2001
Mick Murray	Labor	2001–2005
Collie-Wellington
Mick Murray	Labor	2005–2008
Collie-Preston
Mick Murray	Labor	2008–2021
Jodie Hanns	Labor	2021–present

== Election results ==
=== Elections in the 2020s ===
2025 Western Australian state election: Collie-Preston
Party	Candidate	Votes	%	±%
Labor	Jodie Hanns	11,361	40.6	−21.0
Liberal	Matt Sharp	6,393	22.9	+8.5
National	Cam Parsons	3,571	12.8	+3.8
One Nation	Jess Adams	2,076	7.4	+5.4
Greens	Robert Mann	1,919	6.9	+2.8
Legalise Cannabis	Paul Gullan	1,142	4.1	+2.3
Shooters, Fishers, Farmers	Joshua Wray Coffey	764	2.7	−0.2
Christians	Norm Wiese	736	2.6	+2.6
Total formal votes		27,962	95.2	−0.8
Informal votes		1,412	4.8	+0.8
Turnout		29,374	88.6	+5.2
Two-party-preferred result
Labor	Jodie Hanns	15,177	54.3	−19.0
Liberal	Matt Sharp	12,760	45.7	+19.0
Labor hold		Swing	−19.0	

2021 Western Australian state election: Collie-Preston
Party	Candidate	Votes	%	±%
Labor	Jodie Hanns	16,085	62.2	+12.3
Liberal	Jane Goff	3,778	14.6	−3.3
National	Wayne Sanford	2,245	8.7	−4.3
Greens	Gordon Scantlebury	889	3.4	−0.9
Shooters, Fishers, Farmers	Clinton Thomas	773	3.0	−0.9
One Nation	Michael Williams	533	2.1	−6.6
No Mandatory Vaccination	Christine Merrifield	487	1.9	+1.9
Legalise Cannabis	Emily Wilkinson	458	1.8	+1.8
Independent	Russell Sheridan	385	1.5	+1.5
Sustainable Australia	Graham Butler	149	0.6	+0.6
WAxit	Jackie Tomic	71	0.3	+0.3
Total formal votes		25,853	96.0	+0.2
Informal votes		1,082	4.0	−0.2
Turnout		26,935	87.6	+1.2
Two-party-preferred result
Labor	Jodie Hanns	18,963	73.4	+8.7
Liberal	Jane Goff	6,879	26.6	−8.7
Labor hold		Swing	+8.7	

=== Elections in the 2010s ===
2017 Western Australian state election: Collie-Preston
Party	Candidate	Votes	%	±%
Labor	Mick Murray	12,246	49.5	+10.7
Liberal	Elysia Harverson	4,408	17.8	−22.7
National	Monique Warnock	3,306	13.4	+2.8
One Nation	David Miller	2,069	8.4	+8.4
Greens	Gordon Tayler	1,170	4.7	−1.4
Shooters, Fishers, Farmers	Clinton Thomas	975	3.9	+3.9
Independent	Louie Scibilia	347	1.4	+1.4
Independent	Don Hyland	230	0.9	+0.9
Total formal votes		24,751	95.8	+1.1
Informal votes		1,086	4.2	−1.1
Turnout		25,837	89.9	+0.6
Two-party-preferred result
Labor	Mick Murray	16,003	64.7	+17.6
Liberal	Elysia Harverson	8,728	35.3	−17.6
Labor gain from Liberal		Swing	+17.6	

2013 Western Australian state election: Collie-Preston
Party	Candidate	Votes	%	±%
Labor	Mick Murray	8,708	43.2	−1.0
Liberal	Jaimee Motion	8,250	40.9	+3.6
National	Peter Hutchinson	1,513	7.5	+7.5
Greens	Kingsley Gibson	1,010	5.0	−2.9
Family First	Alice Harper	529	2.6	−5.3
	Clinton Knop	158	0.8	+0.8
Total formal votes		20,168	95.0	
Informal votes		1,069	5.0	
Turnout		21,237	91.72	
Two-party-preferred result
Labor	Mick Murray	10,108	50.1	−3.7
Liberal	Jaimee Motion	10,052	49.9	+3.7
Labor hold		Swing	−3.7	

=== Elections in the 2000s ===
2008 Western Australian state election: Collie-Preston
Party	Candidate	Votes	%	±%
Labor	Mick Murray	8,439	41.00	−1.3
Liberal	Steve Thomas	8,260	40.13	+2.4
Greens	Richard Chapman	1,802	8.75	+2.7
Family First	Keith Hopper	1,534	7.45	+4.6
Christian Democrats	Wayne Barnett	548	2.66	+1.2
Total formal votes		20,583	95.46	
Informal votes		979	4.54	
Turnout		21,562	90.33	
Two-party-preferred result
Labor	Mick Murray	10,494	51.00	+0.1
Liberal	Steve Thomas	10,083	49.00	−0.1
Labor hold		Swing	+0.1	

2005 Western Australian state election: Collie-Wellington
Party	Candidate	Votes	%	±%
Labor	Mick Murray	6,798	50.5	+13.0
Liberal	Craig Carbone	3,741	27.8	+3.9
National	Neale Armstrong	1,517	11.3	+0.6
Greens	David Paris	432	3.2	+0.8
One Nation	Kevin Gordon	283	2.1	−13.8
Family First	Edward Dabrowski	282	2.1	+2.1
Independent	Gary Murrihy	222	1.6	+1.6
Christian Democrats	Tanya Dunjey	110	0.8	+0.8
New Country	Martha Window	70	0.5	+0.5
Total formal votes		13,455	94.4	−0.7
Informal votes		798	5.6	+0.7
Turnout		14,253	92.7	
Two-party-preferred result
Labor	Mick Murray	7,962	59.3	+6.7
Liberal	Craig Carbone	5,463	40.7	−6.7
Labor hold		Swing	+6.7	

2001 Western Australian state election: Collie
Party	Candidate	Votes	%	±%
Labor	Mick Murray	4,162	34.7	−6.0
National	Hilda Turnbull	2,922	24.4	−34.9
Liberal	Steve Thomas	1,897	15.8	+15.8
One Nation	Jan Hough	1,811	15.1	+15.1
Greens	Peter Murphy	844	7.0	+7.0
Independent	Frank Marciano	191	1.6	+1.6
Independent	Andrew Williams	163	1.4	+1.4
Total formal votes		11,990	95.3	−2.2
Informal votes		588	4.7	+2.2
Turnout		12,578	93.7	
Two-party-preferred result
Labor	Mick Murray	5,947	50.1	+9.4
National	Hilda Turnbull	5,913	49.9	−9.4
Labor gain from National		Swing	+9.4	

=== Elections in the 1990s ===
1996 Western Australian state election: Collie
Party	Candidate	Votes	%	±%
National	Hilda Turnbull	6,954	59.3	+26.1
Labor	Mick Murray	4,779	40.7	+1.8
Total formal votes		11,733	97.5	+1.0
Informal votes		295	2.5	−1.0
Turnout		12,028	92.4	
National hold		Swing	+0.9	

1993 Western Australian state election: Collie
Party	Candidate	Votes	%	±%
Labor	Mick Murray	4,280	42.2	−1.2
National	Hilda Turnbull	4,054	39.9	+9.0
Liberal	Harald Peterson	1,427	14.1	−6.9
Democrats	Sandra Churches	172	1.7	−1.6
Independent	Adrianus Hladio	124	1.2	+1.2
Independent	Alfred Bussell	94	0.9	−0.5
Total formal votes		10,151	96.4	+2.3
Informal votes		374	3.6	−2.3
Turnout		10,525	94.9	+2.0
Two-party-preferred result
National	Hilda Turnbull	5,635	55.5	+2.6
Labor	Mick Murray	4,516	44.5	−2.6
National hold		Swing	+2.6	

=== Elections in the 1980s ===
1989 Western Australian state election: Collie
Party	Candidate	Votes	%	±%
Labor	John Mumme	4,091	43.4	−8.1
National	Hilda Turnbull	2,914	30.9	+4.1
Liberal	John Silcock	1,984	21.0	+0.5
Democrats	Ursula Bolitho	311	3.3	+3.3
Independent	Alfred Bussell	129	1.4	+1.4
Total formal votes		9,429	94.1	
Informal votes		592	5.9	
Turnout		10,021	92.9	
Two-party-preferred result
National	Hilda Turnbull	4,984	52.9	+6.5
Labor	John Mumme	4,445	47.1	−6.5
National gain from Labor		Swing	+6.5	

1986 Western Australian state election: Collie
Party	Candidate	Votes	%	±%
Labor	Tom Jones	4,480	51.6	−14.0
National	Hilda Turnbull	2,509	28.9	−5.5
Liberal	John Davison	1,563	18.0	+18.0
Independent	Roy Bussell	131	1.5	+1.5
Total formal votes		8,683	97.9	+0.1
Informal votes		183	2.1	−0.1
Turnout		8,866	94.2	+2.1
Two-party-preferred result
Labor	Tom Jones	4,706	54.2	−11.4
National	Hilda Turnbull	3,977	45.8	+11.4
Labor hold		Swing	−11.4	

1983 Western Australian state election: Collie
Party	Candidate	Votes	%	±%
Labor	Tom Jones	5,102	65.6	
National Country	Allen Mountford	2,674	34.4	
Total formal votes		7,776	97.9	
Informal votes		312	2.1	
Turnout		7,953	92.1	
Labor hold		Swing		

1980 Western Australian state election: Collie
Party	Candidate	Votes	%	±%
Labor	Tom Jones	unopposed		
Labor hold		Swing		

=== Elections in the 1970s ===
1977 Western Australian state election: Collie
Party	Candidate	Votes	%	±%
Labor	Tom Jones	4,609	61.1	
Liberal	Maurice Williams	2,937	38.9	
Total formal votes		7,546	97.7	
Informal votes		175	2.3	
Turnout		7,721	94.4	
Labor hold		Swing		

1974 Western Australian state election: Collie
Party	Candidate	Votes	%	±%
Labor	Tom Jones	3,943	56.1	
National Alliance	Hilda Turnbull	1,619	23.0	
Liberal	Brian Menzies	1,465	20.9	
Total formal votes		7,027	97.2	
Informal votes		205	2.8	
Turnout		7,232	93.8	
Two-party-preferred result
Labor	Tom Jones	4,186	59.6	
National Alliance	Hilda Turnbull	2,841	40.4	
Labor hold		Swing		

1971 Western Australian state election: Collie
Party	Candidate	Votes	%	±%
Labor	Tom Jones	4,267	79.1	+25.8
Liberal	Iain Paterson	859	15.9	−24.2
Democratic Labor	Stanley Johnston	268	5.0	+5.0
Total formal votes		5,394	98.2	−0.5
Informal votes		101	1.8	+0.5
Turnout		5,495	94.7	−0.4
Two-party-preferred result
Labor	Tom Jones	4,307	79.8	+23.2
Liberal	Iain Paterson	1,087	20.2	−23.2
Labor hold		Swing	+23.2	

=== Elections in the 1960s ===
1968 Western Australian state election: Collie
Party	Candidate	Votes	%	±%
Labor	Tom Jones	2,827	53.3	
Liberal and Country	Bob Pike	2,125	40.1	
Independent	John Davidson	352	6.6	
Total formal votes		5,304	98.7	
Informal votes		70	1.3	
Turnout		5,374	95.1	
Two-party-preferred result
Labor	Tom Jones	3,003	56.6	
Liberal and Country	Bob Pike	2,301	43.4	
Labor hold		Swing		

1965 Western Australian state election: Collie
Party	Candidate	Votes	%	±%
Labor	Harry May	2,990	60.9	+2.0
Liberal and Country	Edward Cocker	1,923	39.1	+12.0
Total formal votes		4,913	97.7	−1.6
Informal votes		117	2.3	+1.6
Turnout		5,030	94.7	−0.1
Labor hold		Swing	−5.0	

1962 Western Australian state election: Collie
Party	Candidate	Votes	%	±%
Labor	Harry May	2,937	58.9	
Liberal and Country	Edward Cocker	1,352	27.1	
Independent	Norman Coote	698	14.0	
Total formal votes		4,987	99.3	
Informal votes		33	0.7	
Turnout		5,020	94.8	
Two-party-preferred result
Labor	Harry May		65.9	
Liberal and Country	Edward Cocker		34.1	
Labor hold		Swing		

- Two party preferred vote was estimated.

=== Elections in the 1950s ===
1959 Western Australian state election: Collie
Party	Candidate	Votes	%	±%
Labor	Harry May	3,290	71.1	−3.4
Independent	Norman Coote	1,335	28.9	+28.9
Total formal votes		4,625	98.8	+0.5
Informal votes		56	1.2	−0.5
Turnout		4,681	95.0	+0.7
Labor hold		Swing	N/A	

1956 Western Australian state election: Collie
Party	Candidate	Votes	%	±%
Labor	Harry May	3,415	74.5	
Country	Norman Coote	1,048	22.9	
Communist	Norman Lacey	120	2.6	
Total formal votes		4,583	98.3	
Informal votes		80	1.7	
Turnout		4,663	94.3	
Two-party-preferred result
Labor	Harry May		76.9	
Country	Norman Coote		23.1	
Labor hold		Swing		

- Two party preferred vote was estimated.

1953 Western Australian state election: Collie
Party	Candidate	Votes	%	±%
Labor	Harry May	unopposed		
Labor hold		Swing		

1950 Western Australian state election: Collie
Party	Candidate	Votes	%	±%
Labor	Harry May	unopposed		
Labor hold		Swing		

=== Elections in the 1940s ===
1947 Western Australian state election: Collie
Party	Candidate	Votes	%	±%
Labor	Harry May	unopposed		
Labor hold		Swing		

1943 Western Australian state election: Collie
Party	Candidate	Votes	%	±%
Labor	Arthur Wilson	unopposed		
Labor hold		Swing		

=== Elections in the 1930s ===
1939 Western Australian state election: Collie
Party	Candidate	Votes	%	±%
Labor	Arthur Wilson	unopposed		
Labor hold		Swing		

1936 Western Australian state election: Collie
Party	Candidate	Votes	%	±%
Labor	Arthur Wilson	unopposed		
Labor hold		Swing		

1933 Western Australian state election: Collie
Party	Candidate	Votes	%	±%
Labor	Arthur Wilson	2,732	69.3	−30.7
Independent Labor	Harry Stapledon	1,208	30.7	+30.7
Total formal votes		3,940	98.8	
Informal votes		46	1.2	
Turnout		3,986	90.0	
Labor hold		Swing	N/A	

1930 Western Australian state election: Collie
Party	Candidate	Votes	%	±%
Labor	Arthur Wilson	unopposed		
Labor hold		Swing		

=== Elections in the 1920s ===
1927 Western Australian state election: Collie
Party	Candidate	Votes	%	±%
Labor	Arthur Wilson	unopposed		
Labor hold		Swing		

1924 Western Australian state election: Collie
Party	Candidate	Votes	%	±%
Labor	Arthur Wilson	unopposed		
Labor hold		Swing		

1921 Western Australian state election: Collie
Party	Candidate	Votes	%	±%
Labor	Arthur Wilson	unopposed		
Labor hold		Swing		

=== Elections in the 1910s ===
1917 Western Australian state election: Collie
Party	Candidate	Votes	%	±%
Labor	Arthur Wilson	unopposed		
Labor hold		Swing		

1914 Western Australian state election: Collie
Party	Candidate	Votes	%	±%
Labor	Arthur Wilson	1,632	70.4	−29.6
Liberal	Herbert Wells	685	29.6	+29.6
Total formal votes		2,317	99.1	
Informal votes		21	0.9	
Turnout		2,338	46.8	
Labor hold		Swing	N/A	

1911 Western Australian state election: Collie
Party	Candidate	Votes	%	±%
Labor	Arthur Wilson	unopposed		
Labor hold		Swing		

=== Elections in the 1900s ===
1908 Western Australian state election: Collie
Party	Candidate	Votes	%	±%
Labour	Arthur Wilson	1,039	51.3	+5.3
Ministerialist	John Ewing	985	48.7	−5.3
Total formal votes		2,024	99.2	−0.7
Informal votes		17	0.8	+0.7
Turnout		2,041	71.3	+21.5
Labour gain from Ministerialist		Swing	+5.3	

1905 Western Australian state election: Collie
Party	Candidate	Votes	%	±%
Ministerialist	John Ewing	600	54.0	+13.5
Labour	Ernest Henshaw	511	46.0	–13.5
Total formal votes		1,111	99.9	+1.3
Informal votes		1	0.1	–1.3
Turnout		1,112	49.8	+0.8
Ministerialist gain from Labour		Swing	+13.5	

1904 Western Australian state election: Collie
Party	Candidate	Votes	%	±%
Labour	Ernest Henshaw	859	59.5	+59.5
Ministerialist	John Ewing	584	40.5	+40.5
Total formal votes		1,443	98.6	n/a
Informal votes		21	1.4	n/a
Turnout		1,464	49.0	n/a
Labour win		(new seat)		

1901 Western Australian state election: South West Mining
Party	Candidate	Votes	%	±%
Opposition	John Ewing	394	53.2	+53.2
Labour	George Henderson	205	27.7	+27.7
Opposition	Harry Courtney	142	19.2	+19.2
Total formal votes		741	99.3	n/a
Informal votes		5	0.7	n/a
Turnout		746	60.7	n/a
Opposition win		(new seat)		
