= Gwindinup, Western Australia =

Locality in the Shire of Capel, Western Australia

Gwindinup
- Town
- Coordinates: 33.51°S 115.74°E
- Country: Australia
- State: Western Australia
- LGA(s): Shire of Capel
- Location: 191 km (119 mi) from Perth; 26 km (16 mi) from Bunbury; 23 km (14 mi) from Capel

Government
  - State electorate(s): Collie-Preston
  - Federal division(s): Forrest

Area
  - Total: 15.3 km^{2} (5.9 sq mi)

Population
  - Total(s): 52 (SAL 2021)
- Postcode: 6237
Localities around Gwindinup
Boyanup	Boyanup	Crooked Brook
The Plains	Gwindinup	Crooked Brook
The Plains	Paynedale	Argyle

Gwindinup is a small town and locality of the Shire of Capel in the South West region of Western Australia, located along the South Western Highway and the Preston River.

The Shire of Capel and the locality of Gwindinup are located on the traditional land of the Wardandi (also spelled Wadandi) people of the Noongar nation.

The area of the Gwindinup townsite, including the sites of the former Runnymead Mill and school, are heritage-listed. The town's origin dates back to 1892 when it was founded as a railway siding, then under the name of Runnymeade, on the Boyanup to Donnybrook railway line. A town site was gazetted in 1909 but, to prevent confusion as the name Runnymeade was already in use in Australia, the name Gwindinup was allocated to the new town instead. The origins of the name are unknown but may come from a local variation of the spelling of the near-by Gynudup Brook.

== See also ==
- -up, a suffix common to place names in south western Western Australia
