= List of State Register of Heritage Places in the Shire of Capel =

The State Register of Heritage Places is maintained by the Heritage Council of Western Australia. As of 2026, 189 places are heritage-listed in the Shire of Capel, of which eleven are on the State Register of Heritage Places.

== List ==
The Western Australian State Register of Heritage Places, as of 2026, lists the following eleven state registered places within the Shire of Capel:

Place name	Place #	Street number	Street name	Suburb or town	Co-ordinates	Notes & former names	Photo
Higgins Cut (former)	368		Springfield, Ludlow Road North	Capel	33.541136°S 115.493872°E		
St John's Anglican Church, Capel	436	88	Capel Drive	Capel	33.552323°S 115.562937°E	Site of original stone church	
Minninup Homestead	440		Mangles Road	Minninup	33.477328°S 115.555545°E		
St Louis Catholic Church, Boyanup	442	Corner	Bridge Street & Thomas Street	Boyanup	33.482357°S 115.729462°E		
Lexden Park	3022	2	Jamieson Road	Capel	33.567123°S 115.576951°E	Payne's Mill, Mount Pleasant	
Slab Hut, Boyanup Farm	3089		South Western Highway	Boyanup	33.498827°S 115.729387°E	Bessneut Springs, Smith's Cottage (former), Slab Hut, Boyanup Farm	
Lime Kilns	4622		Ludlow Road North	Capel	33.537747°S 115.516337°E	Lara Lime Kilns, Coolingup Lime Works	
Forestry Houses, State Forest No 2	14872		Ludlow Road	Ludlow	33.602226°S 115.480426°E		
Single Men's Quarters, State Forest No 2	14874		Ludlow Road	Ludlow River	33.601205°S 115.478334°E		
Ludlow Forestry Mill and Settlement	15834		Corner Ludlow Road North & Tuart Drive	Ludlow	33.601764°S 115.479149°E	Ludlow Forestry Settlement	
Minninup Homestead Precinct	24632		Mangles Road	Capel	33.477328°S 115.555545°E		
