= Stratham, Western Australia =

Locality in the Shire of Capel, Western Australia

Stratham
- Suburb
- Interactive map of Stratham
- Coordinates: 33.47°S 115.59°E
- Country: Australia
- State: Western Australia
- LGA: Shire of Capel
- Location: 191 km (119 mi) from Perth; 19 km (12 mi) from Bunbury; 11 km (6.8 mi) from Capel

Government
  - State electorates: Bunbury; Collie-Preston
  - Federal division: Forrest

Area
  - Total: 40.8 km^{2} (15.8 sq mi)

Population
  - Total: 793 (SAL 2021)
- Postcode: 6237
Suburbs around Stratham
Geographe Bay	Dalyellup	Gelorup
	Stratham	Boyanup
Stirling Estate	Capel	Elgin

Stratham is a semi-rural locality of the Shire of Capel in the South West region of Western Australia, located on Geographe Bay and on Bussell Highway. In the south-west, a section of the Tuart Forest National Park is located within Stratham.

The Shire of Capel and the locality of Stratham are located on the traditional land of the Wardandi (also spelled Wadandi) people of the Noongar nation.

A number of heritage-listed sites exist in the locality, among them Sunnyside, Stratham Park, Roselands and Rosemore homesteads as well as the All Souls Church. Stratham Park homestead dates back to the 1850s, when John Scott, a constable in Bunbury, married and settled in the area, building a four-room cottage which he named after the family home in Scotland. The near-by Roselands, Sunnyside and Rosemore properties were owned by relatives of John Scott, his brother, his son and his nephew.
