= The Plains, Western Australia =

Locality in the Shire of Capel, Western Australia

The Plains
- Suburb
- Coordinates: 33.56°S 115.69°E
- Country: Australia
- State: Western Australia
- LGA: Shire of Capel
- Location: 200 km (120 mi) from Perth; 32 km (20 mi) from Bunbury; 14 km (8.7 mi) from Capel

Government
  - State electorate: Collie-Preston
  - Federal division: Forrest

Area
  - Total: 64.4 km^{2} (24.9 sq mi)

Population
  - Total: 52 (SAL 2021)
- Postcode: 6237
Suburbs around The Plains
Elgin	Boyanup	Gwindinup
Elgin	The Plains	Paynedale
Capel River	Capel River	Paynedale

The Plains is a rural locality of the Shire of Capel in the South West region of Western Australia.

The Shire of Capel and the locality of The Plains are located on the traditional land of the Wardandi (also spelled Wadandi) people of the Noongar nation.
