= Elgin, Western Australia =

Locality in the Shire of Capel, Western Australia

Elgin
- Suburb
- Coordinates: 33.51°S 115.63°E
- Country: Australia
- State: Western Australia
- LGA: Shire of Capel
- Location: 195 km (121 mi) from Perth; 26 km (16 mi) from Bunbury; 9 km (5.6 mi) from Capel

Government
  - State electorate: Collie-Preston
  - Federal division: Forrest

Area
  - Total: 60.2 km^{2} (23.2 sq mi)

Population
  - Total: 133 (SAL 2021)
- Postcode: 6237
Suburbs around Elgin
Stratham	Stratham	Boyanup
Capel	Elgin	The Plains
Capel	Capel River	The Plains

Elgin is a rural locality of the Shire of Capel in the South West region of Western Australia.

The Shire of Capel and the locality of Elgin are located on the traditional land of the Wardandi (also spelled Wadandi) people of the Noongar nation.

A number of heritage-listed sites exist in the locality, among them Elgin Siding, Elgin School, the Bridge Homestead and Cocker's Well, the latter named after an indigenous drover.

Elgin Siding, established around 1895, was located on the Boyanup to Busselton railway line, which commenced operation in 1891 but nothing remains of the former railway siding now, which was located near Elgin Hall on Railway Road. Elgin Hall was constructed in 1931 and is also heritage listed.

The Elgin School operated from 1909 to 1936, after which the children from the locality attended school in Stratham.
