= Stirling Estate, Western Australia =

Locality in the Shire of Capel, Western Australia

Stirling Estate
- Suburb
- Interactive map of Stirling Estate
- Coordinates: 33.52°S 115.54°E
- Country: Australia
- State: Western Australia
- LGA: Shire of Capel
- Location: 197 km (122 mi) from Perth; 28 km (17 mi) from Bunbury; 4 km (2.5 mi) from Capel

Government
  - State electorates: Bunbury; Vasse
  - Federal division: Forrest

Area
  - Total: 28.5 km^{2} (11.0 sq mi)

Population
  - Total: 161 (SAL 2021)
- Postcode: 6271
Suburbs around Stirling Estate
Geographe Bay		Stratham
Peppermint Grove Beach	Stirling Estate	Capel
Forrest Beach	Capel	Capel

Stirling Estate is a rural locality of the Shire of Capel in the South West region of Western Australia, located on Geographe Bay. In the south, a section of the Tuart Forest National Park is located within the locality. The Capel River flows through the locality, with its mouth located at the boundary of Stirling Estate and Peppermint Grove Beach.

The Shire of Capel and the locality of Stirling Estate are located on the traditional land of the Wardandi (also spelled Wadandi) people of the Noongar nation.

A number of heritage-listed sites exist in the locality, among them The Grange, Dunkley's Place, Summerlea and Robert's Old Capel Farm homesteads.
