= Capel River, Western Australia =

Locality in the Shire of Capel, Western Australia

Capel River
- Suburb
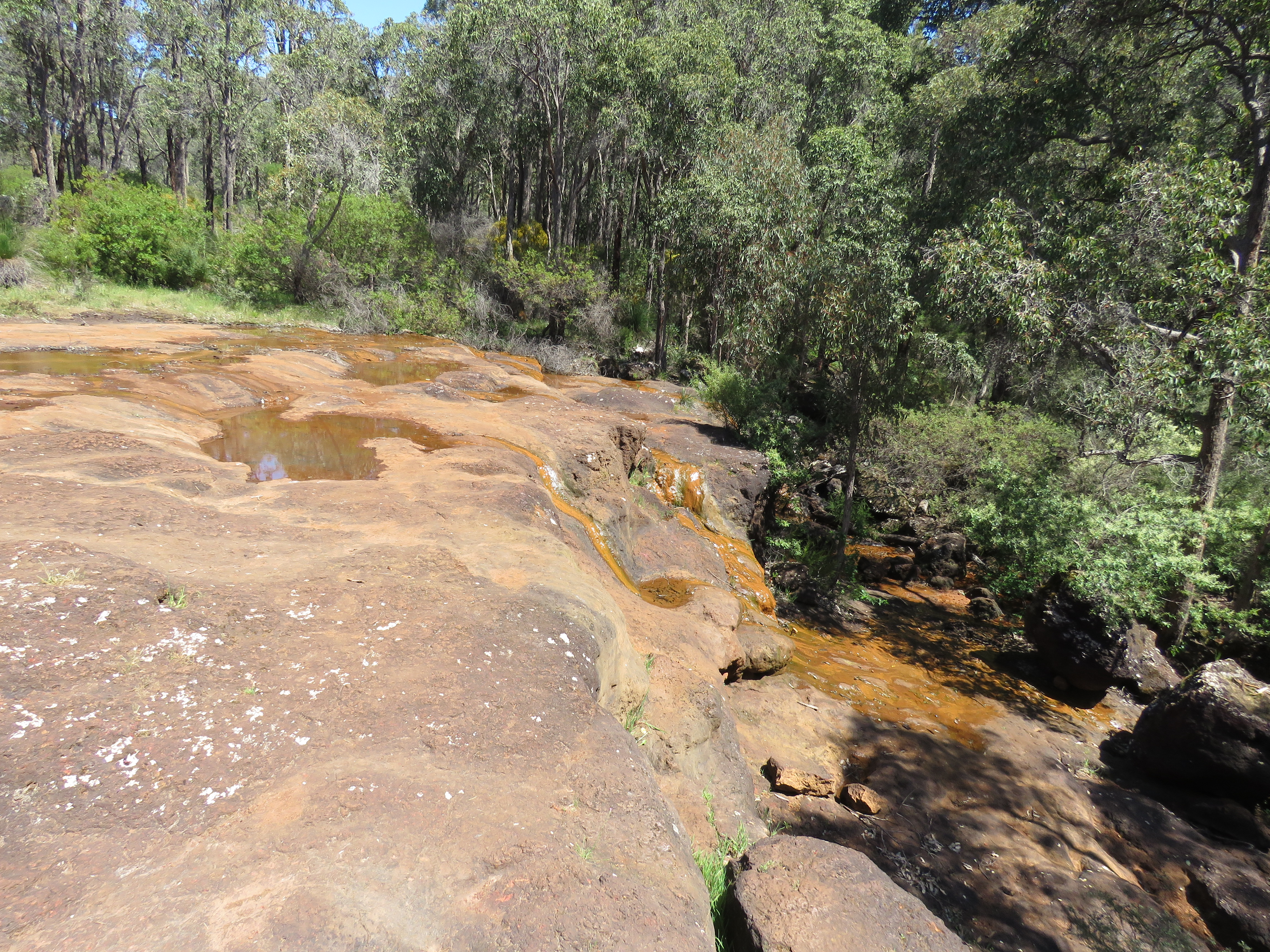
- The Ironstone Gully Falls, located on a tributary of the Capel River
- Coordinates: 33.65°S 115.67°E
- Country: Australia
- State: Western Australia
- LGA(s): Shire of Capel
- Location: 209 km (130 mi) from Perth; 40 km (25 mi) from Bunbury; 12 km (7.5 mi) from Capel

Government
  - State electorate(s): Vasse
  - Federal division(s): Forrest

Area
  - Total: 95.1 km^{2} (36.7 sq mi)

Population
  - Total(s): 136 (SAL 2021)
- Postcode: 6271
Suburbs around Capel River
Capel	Elgin	The Plains
Tutunup	Capel River	Paynedale
Tutunup	Yoganup	Yoganup

Capel River is a rural locality of the Shire of Capel in the South West region of Western Australia, located along the eponymous Capel River.

The Shire of Capel and the locality of Capel River are located on the traditional land of the Wardandi (also spelled Wadandi) people of the Noongar nation.

Several heritage-listed sites are located in the locality, including the former Moriarty's Timber Mill, two entities named Capel River School, and Tom Hutton's Place.
