= Paynedale, Western Australia =

Locality in the Shire of Donnybrook–Balingup, Western Australia

Paynedale
- other
- Coordinates: 33.60°S 115.76°E
- Country: Australia
- State: Western Australia
- LGA: Shire of Donnybrook–Balingup
- Location: 189 km (117 mi) from Perth; 39 km (24 mi) from Bunbury; 11 km (6.8 mi) from Donnybrook

Government
  - State electorate: Collie-Preston
  - Federal division: Forrest

Area
  - Total: 76.5 km^{2} (29.5 sq mi)

Population
  - Total: 60 (SAL 2021)
- Postcode: 6239
Localities around Paynedale
Gwindinup	Argyle	Donnybrook
The Plains	Paynedale	Upper Capel
Capel River	Upper Capel	Upper Capel

Paynedale is a rural locality of the Shire of Donnybrook–Balingup in the South West region of Western Australia. The Capel River flows through the far southern part of the locality, which is agricultural, while the remainder of Paynedale is mostly covered by forest of the Boyanup State Forest.

Paynedale and the Shire of Donnybrook–Balingup are located on the traditional land of the Wardandi people of the Noongar nation.
