= Peppermint Grove Beach =

- Town
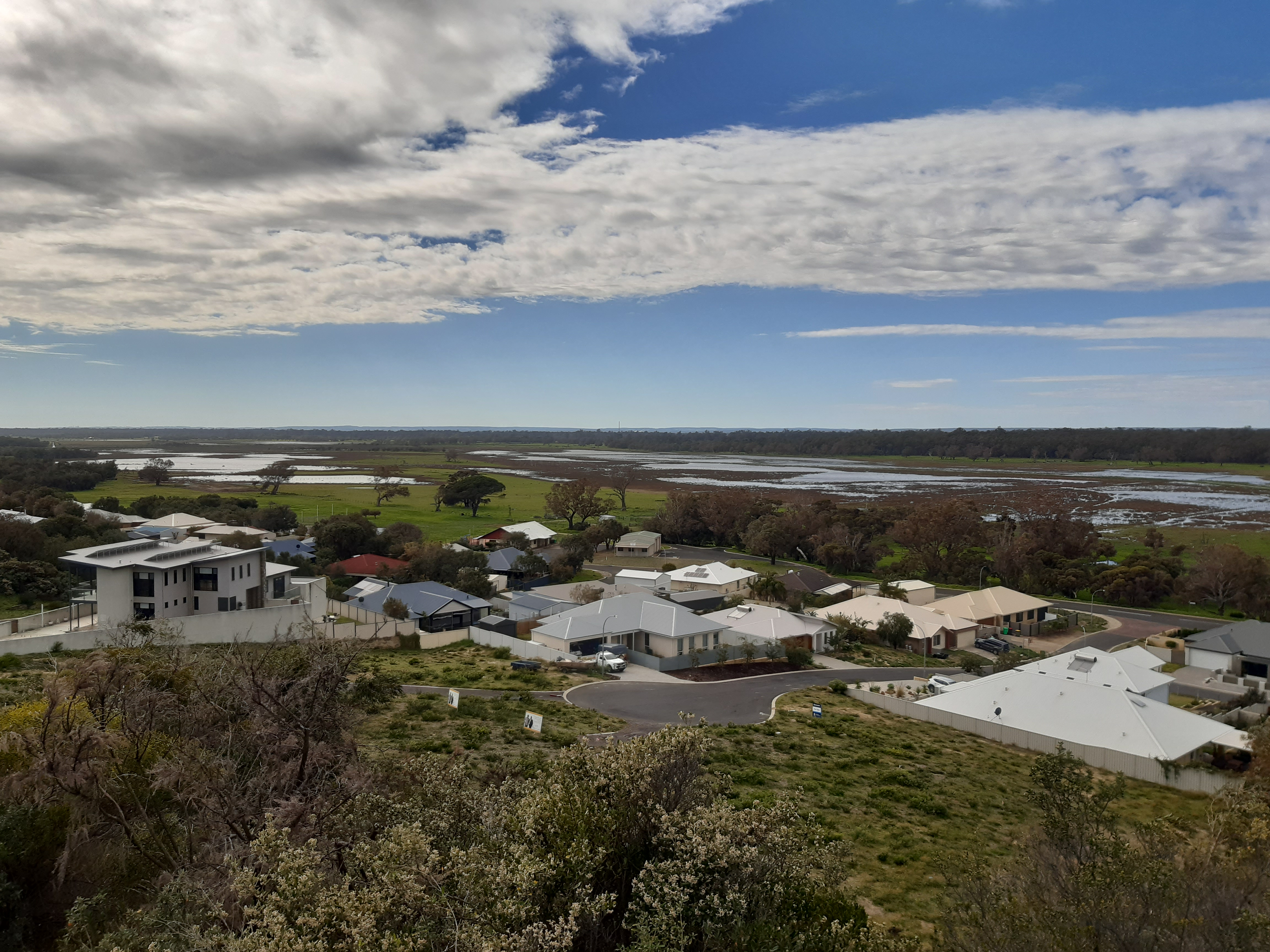
- Looking east from the lookout in Peppermint Grove Beach

- Interactive map of Peppermint Grove Beach
- Coordinates: 33.52°S 115.51°E
- Country: Australia
- State: Western Australia
- LGA: Shire of Capel
- Location: 8 km (5.0 mi) NW of Capel; 201 km (125 mi) SSW of Perth
- Established: 1970s

Government
  - State electorate: Collie-Preston
  - Federal division: Forrest

Area
  - Total: 1.6 km^{2} (0.62 sq mi)
- Elevation: 16 m (52 ft)

Population
  - Total: 518 (SAL 2021)
- Postcode: 6271

Peppermint Grove Beach is a residential subdivision and beachside town in the South West region of Western Australia. Its local government area is the Shire of Capel and it is located 8 kilometres (5 mi) northwest of Capel on the Geographe Bay coast near the Capel River mouth.

Peppermint Grove Beach, sometimes called Peppermint Grove Beach Estate, is situated on land that was first farmed by James McCourt, an Irish Catholic settler in the 19th century. James McCourt arrived in the colony in 1842 with his wife Mary and two children, on the 'Trusty'. He worked at Australind as a timber worker. In 1843, they abandoned Australind and moved to Ludlow where several Catholic families had settled. By 1847 McCourt had a 330-acre depasturing lease which he named 'Fatfield' by 1848. He expanded his property. After buying land at Peppermint Grove Beach in 1854, he purchased locations 181–185 in 1860. In 1862, after floods washed away their dwelling, he sold property to Captain Molloy. After some years of financial difficulties, he was able to retain Peppermint Grove properties and built a dwelling. He established 'McCourt's Farm', growing onions, breeding horses and raising cattle. In 1873, the government resumed part of Location 182 as a site chosen for a cut through the sea. In 1874, Charles Manning (Clerk of Works) had the cut built by the last of the convicts from the Bunbury depot which closed the same year. The cut was immediately south of Doungup, and is still there. McCourt was employed to keep the cut clear. People often camped on the land in the valley near the safe swimming spot and during the popularity of the place, it became known as Peppermint Grove. James McCourt died in 1899. His daughter Kathleen McCourt married Robert Hardey in 1904, after having helped run the farm for a number of years, continued to do so after her husband died in 1933. During WWII, a lookout was established at Hardy's Hill and Alex Campbell was stationed there. Mrs Hardey employed him to help on the farm before he was assigned to Bougainville. After the war, Alex Campbell settled his family with Mrs Hardey, purchased some land and managed the property. When Mrs Hardey died, (early 1950s) she left some property to Alex Campbell. In the early 1960s part of the farm was sold off the developers and Alex Campbell did some development with the first residential blocks at Peppermint Grove Beach in 1965. In 1966 Jim Campbell and his wife Cheryl became part owners of the property and settled there in 1975. Part of the property has since been developed by the Campbells as the McCourt Hill Estate.

During World War II, the Australian Army established a lookout tower on top of the main dune - the highest point between Bunbury and Busselton - to look out for Japanese warships. McCourt's daughter, Mrs Hardy, sold the farm to one of the servicemen, Alex Campbell. Alex Campbell sold land to property developers, but was the first to subdivide and sell land for housing. Much of the original McCourt farm is now residential housing. Remnants of McCourt's original house remain on an undeveloped section of land.

Much of the estate is in the immediate vicinity of the ocean, and there is beach access in several locations. Facilities and attractions include a small park near the main beach access, and a caravan park.
