= Pterostylis angusta =

Narrow shell orchid

Scientific classification
- Kingdom: Plantae
- Clade: Tracheophytes
- Clade: Angiosperms
- Clade: Monocots
- Order: Asparagales
- Family: Orchidaceae
- Subfamily: Orchidoideae
- Tribe: Cranichideae
- Genus: Pterostylis
- Species: P. angusta

Binomial name
- Pterostylis angusta A.S.George

Synonyms
- Diplodium angustum (A.S.George) D.L.Jones & M.A.Clem.

Species of orchid

Pterostylis angusta, commonly known as the narrow shell orchid, is a species of orchid endemic to the south-west of Western Australia. As with similar greenhoods, the flowering plants differ from those which are not flowering. The non-flowering plants have a rosette of leaves flat on the ground but the flowering plants have a single flower with leaves on the flowering spike. In this species the flower is green, white and brown with an inflated base, a narrow hood and the longest labellum of any Western Australian Pterostylis species.

== Description ==
Pterostylis angusta is a terrestrial, perennial, deciduous, herb with an underground tuber and when not flowering, a rosette of dark bluish-green leaves lying flat on the ground. Each leaf is 10–25 mm (0.4–1 in) long and 7–12 mm (0.3–0.5 in) wide. Flowering plants usually only have a single flower 12–15 mm (0.5–0.6 in) long and 7–8 mm (0.3–0.3 in) wide which leans slightly forwards on a flowering stem 80–200 mm (3–8 in) high with between three and seven stem leaves. The flowers are green and white, brownish near the tip. The dorsal sepal and petals are fused, forming a hood or "galea" over the column. The base of the galea is inflated and the top is narrow with a sharply-pointed end. The lateral sepals are held closely against the galea and have narrow tips 15–18 mm (0.6–0.7 in) long and a V-shaped sinus between their bases. The labellum is 13–15 mm (0.5–0.6 in) long, about 2 mm (0.08 in) wide and curved, and protrudes above the sinus. Flowering occurs from late May to July.

== Taxonomy and naming ==
Pterostylis angusta was first formally described in 1971 by Alex George from a specimen collected near Mount Trio in the Stirling Range and the description was published in Nuytsia. The specific epithet (angusta) is a Latin word meaning "narrow", referring to the narrow galea.

== Distribution and habitat ==
The narrow shell orchid grows in two disjunct areas in the Jarrah Forest biogeographic region, one between Brookton and the Stirling Range and the other between Australind and Capel. It mostly grows in woodland, often in sandy soil.

== Conservation ==
Pterostylis angusta is listed as "not threatened" by the Government of Western Australia Department of Parks and Wildlife.
