= Argyle, Western Australia =

Locality in the Shire of Donnybrook–Balingup, Western Australia

Argyle
- other
- Coordinates: 33.55°S 115.77°E
- Country: Australia
- State: Western Australia
- LGA: Shire of Donnybrook–Balingup
- Location: 176 km (109 mi) from Perth; 27 km (17 mi) from Bunbury; 7 km (4.3 mi) from Donnybrook

Government
  - State electorate: Collie-Preston
  - Federal division: Forrest

Area
  - Total: 13.8 km^{2} (5.3 sq mi)

Population
  - Total: 575 (SAL 2021)
- Postcode: 6239
Localities around Argyle
| Gwindinup | Gwindinup | Crooked Brook |
| Paynedale | Argyle | Donnybrook |
| Paynedale | Paynedale | Donnybrook |

Argyle is a rural locality of the Shire of Donnybrook–Balingup in the South West region of Western Australia. The South Western Highway and the Preston River run alongside each other through the locality.

Argyle and the Shire of Donnybrook–Balingup are located on the traditional land of the Wardandi people of the Noongar nation.

The locality is home to the heritage listed Hazelwood homestead, built in 1905 by William Edward Dempster.
