= Calytrix retrorsifolia =

Scientific classification
- Kingdom: Plantae
- Clade: Tracheophytes
- Clade: Angiosperms
- Clade: Eudicots
- Clade: Rosids
- Order: Myrtales
- Family: Myrtaceae
- Genus: Calytrix
- Species: C. retrorsifolia

Binomial name
- Calytrix retrorsifolia Nge & K.R.Thiele

Species of flowering plant

Calytrix retrorsifolia is a species of flowering plant in the myrtle family Myrtaceae and is endemic to a restricted part of the south-west of Western Australia. It is a slender, spreading, open shrub with linear leaves and clusters of white flowers with 23 to 40 white stamens in several rows.

== Description ==
Calytrix retrorsifolia is a slender, spreading, open shrub that typically grows to a height of up to 0.3–2 m (1 ft 0 in – 6 ft 7 in). The leaves are linear, 3.7–7.3 mm (0.15–0.29 in) long, 0.3–0.45 mm (0.012–0.018 in) wide on a petiole 0.5–1 mm (0.020–0.039 in) long. The flowers are borne in clusters 20–100 mm (0.79–3.94 in) long on a peduncle about 0.5 mm (0.020 in) long with green to light brown bracteoles 1.5–3.0 mm (0.059–0.118 in) long. The floral tube is 1.5–2.0 mm (0.059–0.079 in) long and has 5 ribs. The sepals are 0.3–0.6 mm (0.012–0.024 in) long and 0.4–0.5 mm (0.016–0.020 in) wide and lack awns. The petals are yellow in the bud stage, then white, 4–5 mm (0.16–0.20 in) long and 0.5–1.3 mm (0.020–0.051 in) wide with 23 to 40 white stamens, the longest filaments 3–4 mm (0.12–0.16 in) long. Flowering mostly occurs in October.

== Taxonomy ==
Calytrix retrorsifolia was first formally described in 2017 by Francis Jason Nge and Kevin R. Thiele in the journal Nuytsia from specimens collected near Tutunup by Greg Keighery and Neil Gibson. The specific epithet (retrorsifolia) means 'bent backwards-leaved'.

== Distribution and habitat ==
This species of Calytrix is restricted to the Whicher Range where it grows in shallow red clays and/or yellow sands in shrublands and woodlands in the Swan Coastal Plain bioregion of south-western Western Australia.

== Conservation status ==
This star flower is listed as "Priority One" by the Government of Western Australia Department of Biodiversity, Conservation and Attractions, meaning that it is known from only one or a few locations where it is potentially at risk.
