= Forest Beach =

Forest Beach may refer to:

- North and South Forest Beach, on Hilton Head Island, South Carolina
- Forrest Beach, Queensland, 12 miles east of Ingham, Queensland
- Forrest Beach, Western Australia, a locality in the Shire of Capel
