= Forrest Beach, Western Australia =

Locality in the Shire of Capel, Western Australia

Forrest Beach
- Suburb
- Coordinates: 33.57°S 115.47°E
- Country: Australia
- State: Western Australia
- LGA(s): Shire of Capel
- Location: 204 km (127 mi) from Perth; 35 km (22 mi) from Bunbury; 8 km (5.0 mi) from Capel

Government
  - State electorate(s): Collie-Preston
  - Federal division(s): Forrest

Area
  - Total: 18 km^{2} (6.9 sq mi)

Population
  - Total(s): 34 (SAL 2021)
- Postcode: 6271
Suburbs around Forrest Beach
Geographe Bay		Stirling Estate
	Forrest Beach	Capel
	Wonnerup	Ludlow

Forrest Beach is a rural locality of the Shire of Capel in the South West region of Western Australia, located on Geographe Bay. In the east, a section of the Tuart Forest National Park is located within the locality while, in the south, it stretches to the Ludlow River.

The Shire of Capel and the locality of Forrest Beach are located on the traditional land of the Wardandi (also spelled Wadandi) people of the Noongar nation.

Two heritage-listed homesteads are located within the locality, Seaview and Rootfield, with Seaview dating back to 1863, having been built by early settler James McCourt, originally named Fatfield. It subsequently changed names and owners on a number of occasions until adopting its current name in 1885.
