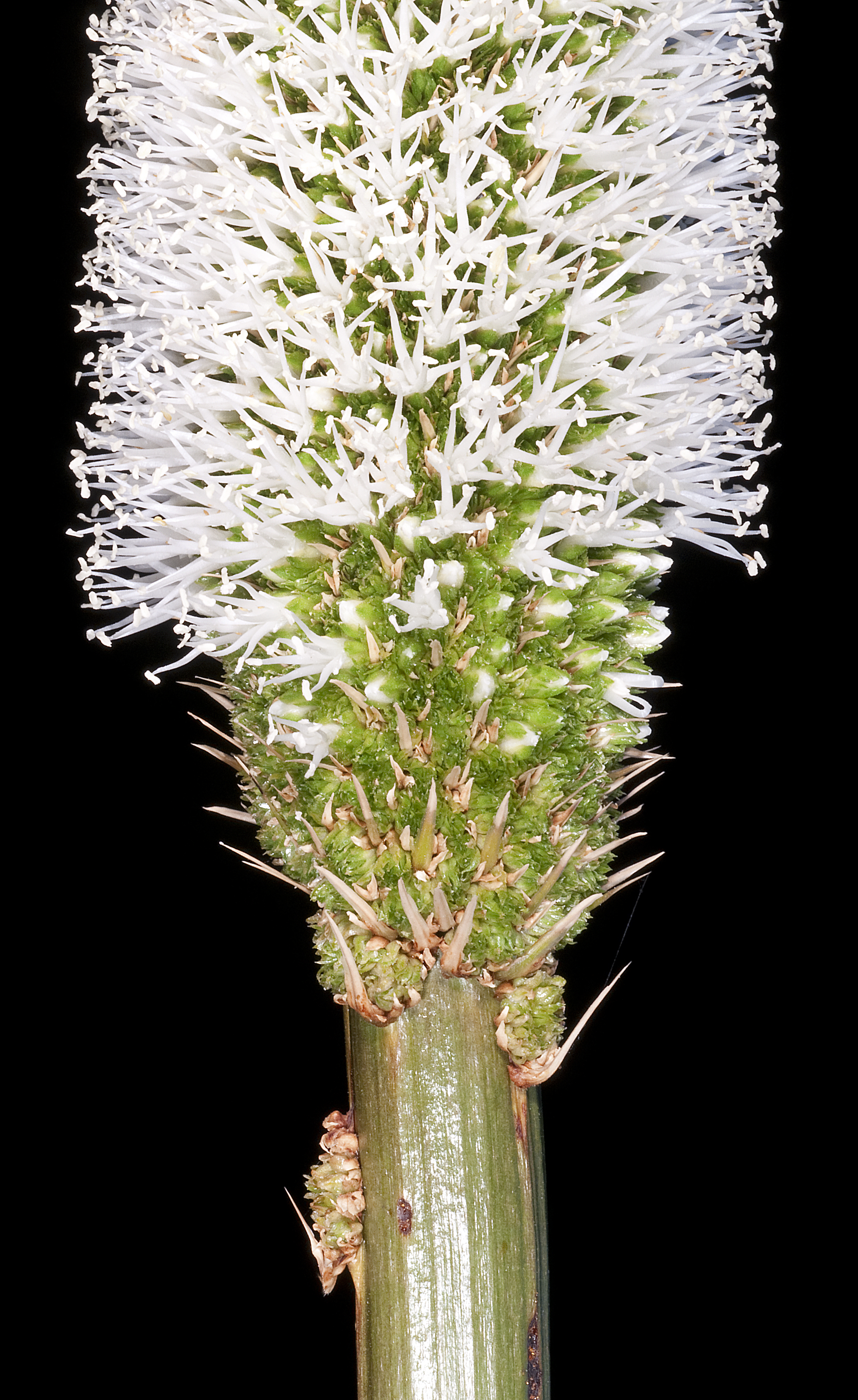
- X. acanthostachya flower-spike

Scientific classification
- Kingdom: Plantae
- Clade: Tracheophytes
- Clade: Angiosperms
- Clade: Monocots
- Order: Asparagales
- Family: Asphodelaceae
- Subfamily: Xanthorrhoeoideae
- Genus: Xanthorrhoea
- Species: X. acanthostachya

Binomial name
- Xanthorrhoea acanthostachya D.J.Bedford

= Xanthorrhoea acanthostachya =

Species of flowering plant

Xanthorrhoea acanthostachya is a species of grasstree of the genus Xanthorrhoea native to Western Australia.

== Description ==
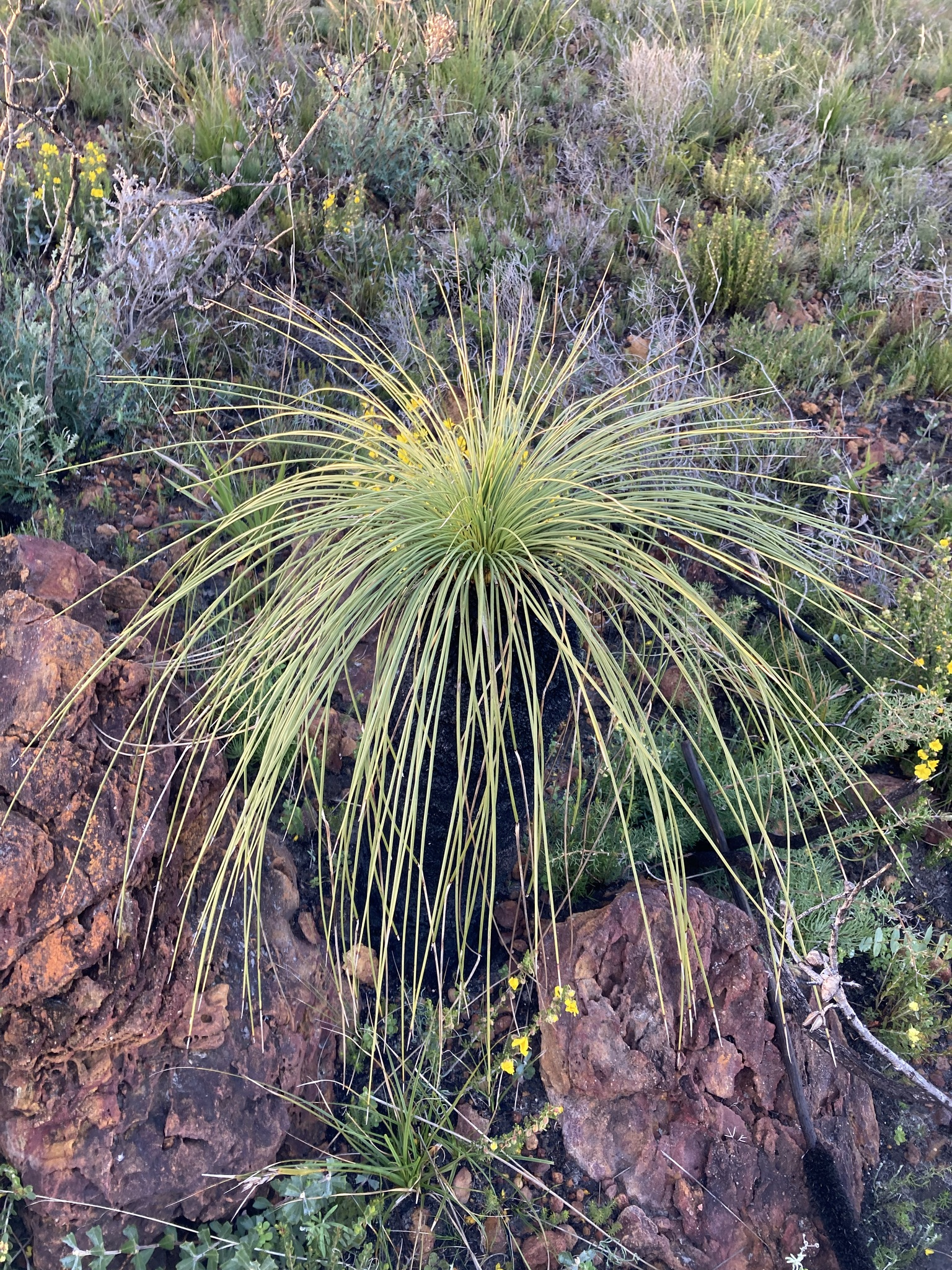
Xanthorrhoea acanthostachya in Coomallo Nature Reserve

The perennial grass tree typically grows to a height of 0.8 to 3 metres (3 to 10 ft) with the trunk reaching 1.5 metres (5 ft), scape of 0.5 metres (1.6 ft) and the flower spike to 0.5 metres (2 ft). It blooms between August and December producing cream-white flowers.

== Classification ==
The species was first formally described by the botanist David Bedford in 1985 as part of the work "Xanthorrhoea acanthostachya (Xanthorrhoeaceae), a new species of the Perth region, Western Australia" as published in the journal Nuytsia.

== Distribution ==
It has a scattered distribution along the west coast in the Wheatbelt, Peel and South West regions of Western Australia. It extends from Coorow in the north to Capel in the south where it grows in sandy soils with lateritic gravel.
