= Harry May =

Australian politician from Western Australia (1892–1972)

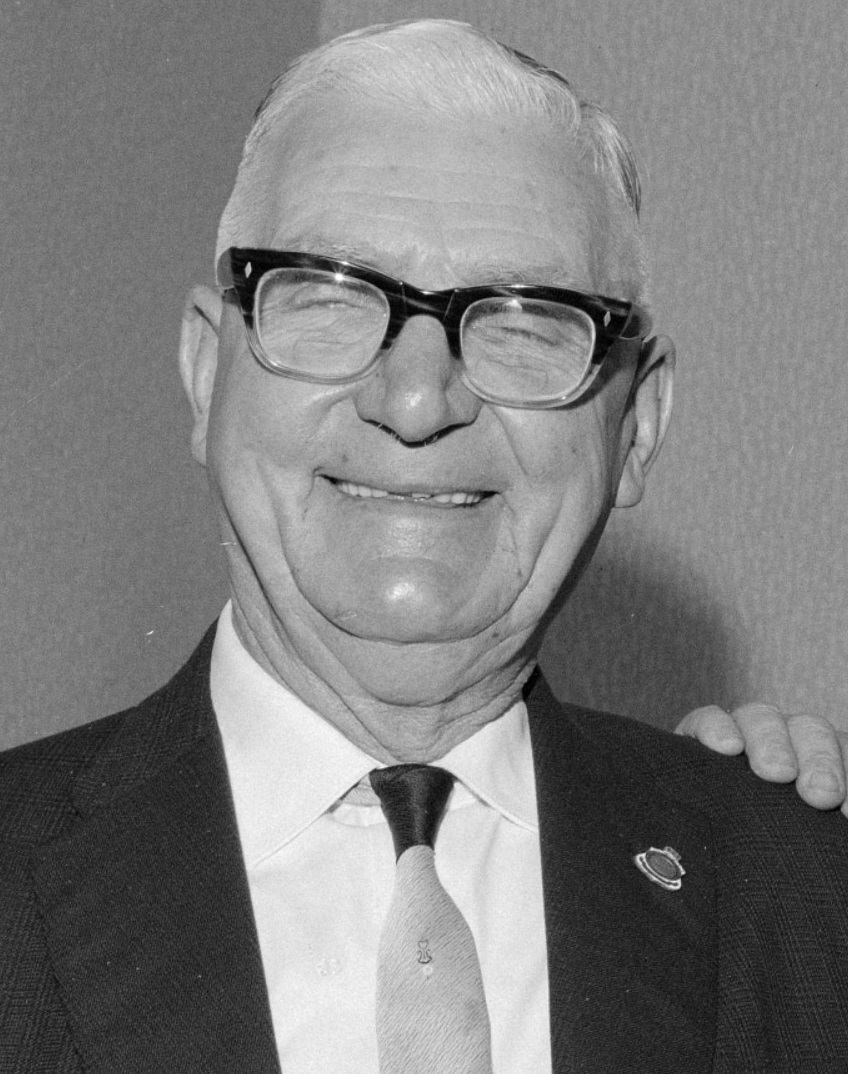
- May in 1960

Member of the Legislative Assembly of Western Australia
- In office 17 February 1947 – 23 March 1968
- Preceded by: Arthur Wilson
- Succeeded by: Tom Jones
- Constituency: Collie

Personal details
- Born: 1 August 1892 Minster-on-Sea, Kent, England
- Died: 13 May 1972 (aged 79) South Perth, Western Australia, Australia
- Party: Labor

Henry Thomas "Harry" May (1 August 1892 – 13 May 1972) was an Australian politician who was a Labor Party member of the Legislative Assembly of Western Australia from 1947 to 1968, representing the seat of Collie.

== Biography ==
May was born in Minster-on-Sea, Kent, England. He arrived in Australia in 1911, to farm wheat at Narrogin. In May 1915, May enlisted in the Australian Imperial Force, serving in the Gallipoli Campaign as a private in the 2/28th Battalion. He was discharged from service in August 1916, sick with enteric fever, and afterward worked as a clerk for the federal Repatriation Department. He eventually settled in Collie, working a variety of roles in the coal industry. A long-time member of the Labor Party, May first attempted to enter politics at the 1944 Legislative Council elections, but was defeated by the sitting Nationalist member, Les Craig. At the 1947 state election, he was elected to the Legislative Assembly seat of Collie, replacing his father-in-law, Arthur Wilson. After Labor's victory at the 1953 election, May was appointed chief whip in the government of Albert Hawke. He remained Labor whip until his retirement at the 1968 election. May died in Perth in 1972, aged 79. His son, Donald George May, was also a member of parliament, and the pair sat together in the Legislative Assembly between 1962 and 1965, the first father and son to do so.

Parliament of Western Australia
Preceded by Arthur Wilson	Member for Collie; 1947–1968	Succeeded by Tom Jones
