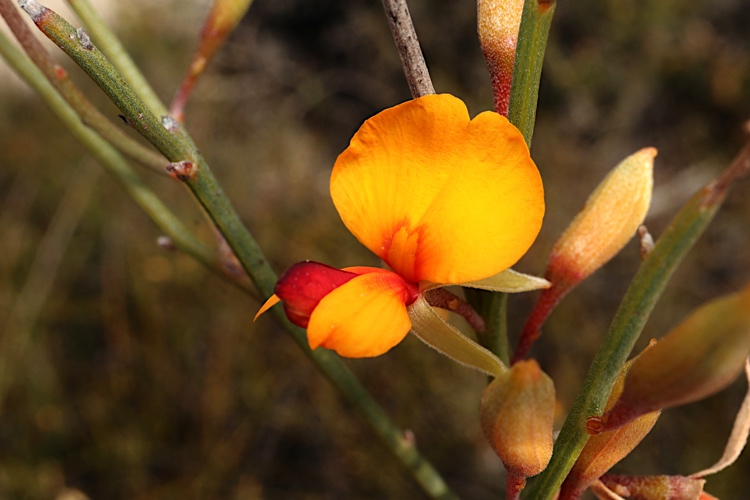

Scientific classification
- Kingdom: Plantae
- Clade: Tracheophytes
- Clade: Angiosperms
- Clade: Eudicots
- Clade: Rosids
- Order: Fabales
- Family: Fabaceae
- Subfamily: Faboideae
- Genus: Jacksonia
- Species: J. lehmannii

Binomial name
- Jacksonia lehmannii Meisn.

Synonyms
- Jacksonia lehmanni Meisn. orth. var.; Piptomeris lehmanni Greene orth. var.; Piptomeris lehmannii (Meisn.) Greene

= Jacksonia lehmannii =

Species of legume

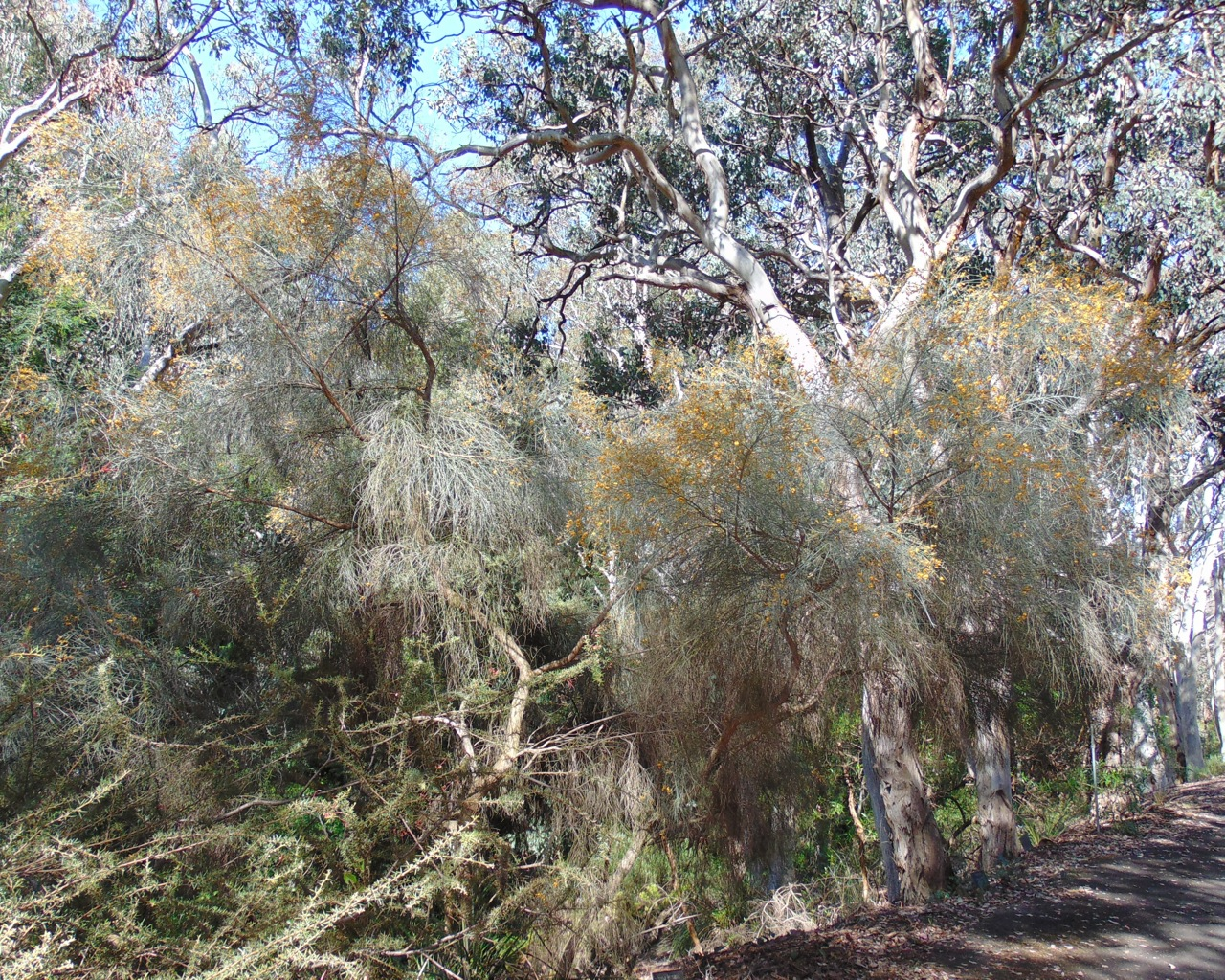
Habit in the Australian National Botanic Gardens

Jacksonia lehmannii is a species of flowering plant in the family Fabaceae and is endemic to the south-west of Western Australia. It is an erect to prostrate or spreading, spindly shrub with greyish-green branches, sharply-pointed side branches, its leaves reduced to scales leaves, yellowish-orange flowers with orange-red markings, and woody, hairy pods.

== Description ==
Jacksonia lehmannii is an erect to prostrate or spreading, spindly shrub that typically grows to 0.1–1.0 m (3.9 in – 3 ft 3.4 in) high and 0.5–1.5 m (1 ft 8 in – 4 ft 11 in) wide. Its branches are greyish-geen, with sharply-pointed side branches. Its leaves are reduced to dark brown, egg-shaped scales, 0.7–0.3 mm (0.028–0.012 in) long and 0.7–1.4 mm (0.028–0.055 in) wide. The flowers are scattered along the branches on a pedicel 6.5–8 mm (0.26–0.31 in) long, with narrowly egg-shaped bracteoles 0.8–1.3 mm (0.031–0.051 in) long on the upper part of the pedicels. The floral tube is 0.5–1.5 mm (0.020–0.059 in) long and the sepals are membranous, with lobes 8–11 mm (0.31–0.43 in) long and 0.9–2 mm (0.035–0.079 in) wide. The standard petal is yellowish-orange with a red "eye", 5.5–8.2 mm (0.22–0.32 in) long, the wings yellowish-orange with red markings and 6.5–8.6 mm (0.26–0.34 in) long, and the keel red, 7.2–8.9 mm (0.28–0.35 in) long. The stamens have deep red filaments 5.7–8.6 mm (0.22–0.34 in) long. Flowering occurs from August to December, and the fruit is a woody hairy, elliptical pod 8–11.7 mm (0.31–0.46 in) long and 3.6–6.7 mm (0.14–0.26 in) wide.

== Taxonomy ==
Jacksonia lehmannii was first formally described in 1844 by Carl Meissner in Lehmann's Plantae Preissianae from specimens collected by James Drummond near the Canning River in 1839. The specific epithet (lehmannii) honours Lehmann.

== Distribution and habitat ==
This species of Jacksonia grows in shrubland or woodland in sandplains on sand over laterite in disjunct areas near Eneabba, between Maida Vale and Pinjarra, and south of Capel in the Geraldton Sandplains, Jarrah Forest and Swan Coastal Plain bioregions of south-western Western Australia.

== Conservation status ==
Jacksonia lehmannii is listed as "not threatened" by the Government of Western Australia Department of Biodiversity, Conservation and Attractions.
