= Hilda Turnbull =

Australian politician

Dr Hilda Margaret Turnbull (née Morcombe) (born 15 January 1942) is an Australian politician. She was a National Party of Western Australia member of the Western Australian Legislative Assembly from 1989 until 2001, representing the electorate of Collie.

Turnbull was born in Perth, and was a general practitioner before entering politics.

She was elected to the Legislative Assembly at the 1989 state election, defeating Labor in the seat of Collie, which they had held since 1908. Her victory followed the retirement of veteran Collie Labor MP Tom Jones. She was the National Party spokesperson for Health, Community Services and Women's Interests from March 1989 until November 1992, and the Coalition Shadow Minister for Family and Youth from November 1992 to February 1993 after the National Party re-entered their coalition with the Liberal Party. She was not appointed to the ministry after the election of the Court Coalition government at the 1993 state election.

Turnbull served on the Library Committee (1993–1998), as chairman of the Select Committee on Intervention in Childbirth (1994–1995), and as a member of the Select Committee on the National HIV/AIDS Strategy White Paper (1989–1990), the Select Committee on Country Hospitals and Nursing Posts (1990–1992), the Select Committee on Science and Technology (1993–1994), and the Select Committee on Heavy Transport (1994–1996).

Turnbull was defeated by Labor candidate Mick Murray at the 2001 state election.

Western Australian Legislative Assembly
Preceded by Tom Jones	Member of Parliament for Collie; 1989–2001	Succeeded by Mick Murray
