= Tutunup, Western Australia =

Locality in the City of Busselton, Western Australia

Tutunup
- Suburb
- Coordinates: 33.66°S 115.56°E
- Country: Australia
- State: Western Australia
- LGA: City of Busselton
- Location: 211 km (131 mi) from Perth; 21 km (13 mi) from Busselton

Government
  - State electorate: Vasse
  - Federal division: Forrest

Area
  - Total: 41.5 km^{2} (16.0 sq mi)

Population
  - Total: 75 (SAL 2021)
- Postcode: 6280
Suburbs around Tutunup
Ludlow	Capel	Capel River
Ruabon	Tutunup	Capel River
Abba River	Yoganup	Yoganup

Tutunup is a rural locality of the City of Busselton in the South West region of Western Australia.

The City of Busselton and the locality of Tutunup are located on the traditional land of the Wardandi (also spelled Wadandi) people of the Noongar nation.

Tutunup was established as Tutunup Siding, located on the Nannup branch railway, as a Group Settlement with the group number 14 in May 1922.

The locality was the site of a proposed mineral sands mine in 2002 by Cable Sands and Iluka Resources, the Tutunup Mineral Sands Project, with the company having applied for approval in 2021. The proposed mine would stretch along the southern boundary of the locality which runs along the edge of Millbrook State Forest.
