= John Ewing (Australian politician) =

Australian politician

The Honourable John Ewing

Member of the Legislative Assembly of Western Australia
- In office 28 April 1901 – 24 June 1904
- Preceded by: none (new creation)
- Succeeded by: Ernest Henshaw
- Constituency: South-West Mining
- In office 27 October 1905 – 11 September 1908
- Preceded by: Ernest Henshaw
- Succeeded by: Arthur Wilson
- Constituency: Collie

Member of the Legislative Council of Western Australia
- In office 18 May 1916 – 30 November 1933
- Preceded by: Sir J. W. Hackett
- Succeeded by: Les Craig
- Constituency: South-West Province

Personal details
- Born: 6 October 1863 Wollongong, New South Wales, Australia
- Died: 30 November 1933 (aged 70) Bassendean, Western Australia, Australia
- Party: Nationalist

John Ewing (6 October 1863 – 30 November 1933) was an Australian politician who served in both houses of the Parliament of Western Australia. He was a member of the Legislative Assembly from 1901 to 1904 and again from 1905 to 1908, and then served as a member of the Legislative Council from 1916 until his death.

Ewing was born in Wollongong, New South Wales, to Elizabeth (née Thomson) and Thomas Campbell Ewing. His brothers, Norman Ewing and Sir Thomas Ewing, were also politicians. Ewing was educated at The King's School, Parramatta, and afterward worked as a surveyor in southern New South Wales. He came to Western Australia in 1896, initially working as a surveyor on the goldfields. He later settled in the South West, living at Bunbury, and in 1897 was responsible for surveying the townsite of Collie. At the 1901 state election, Ewing was elected to represent the South-West Mining constituency in the Legislative Assembly, running as a supporter of the Ministerialist faction (led by George Leake). He lost his seat (which had been renamed Collie) at the 1904 election, to Labor's Ernest Henshaw.

After losing his seat, Ewing was elected chairman of the Collie Road Board in 1905. However, he served for only a short amount of time, as he re-claimed his former seat at that year's state election. At the 1908 election, Ewing lost his seat for a second time, defeated by Labor's Arthur Wilson (who would hold Collie until 1947). Afterward, he returned to his previous profession as a surveyor, working for the Midland Railway Company. Ewing contested the seat of Bunbury at the 1911 state election, but was unsuccessful, losing to Labor's William Thomas. He eventually re-entered parliament in 1916, winning a Legislative Council by-election for South-West Province (caused by the death of John Winthrop Hackett). Ewing was appointed chairman of the committees in the Legislative Council in August 1920, and in June 1923 was elevated to Sir James Mitchell's ministry, as Minister for Education, Minister for Justice, and Minister for the North-West.

The Nationalist–Country coalition government was defeated at the 1924 state election, with Ewing consequently losing his place in the ministry. He did not return to the ministry when the coalition was returned to power at the 1927 election. In the last years of his life, Ewing was in frequent poor health, and went blind, although he remained a member of parliament. He died in a convalescent home in Perth in November 1933, aged 70.

Parliament of Western Australia
Preceded by New creation Ernest Henshaw	Member for Collie; 1901–1904; 1905–1908	Succeeded by Ernest Henshaw; Arthur Wilson
Political offices
Preceded by Hal Colebatch	Minister for Education; 1923–1924	Succeeded by John Drew
Preceded by Hal Colebatch	Minister for Justice; 1923–1924	Succeeded by John Willcock
Preceded by Hal Colebatch	Minister for the North-West; 1923–1924	Abolished
