= Les Craig =

Australian politician (1892–1966)

The Honourable Les Craig CMG

Member of the Legislative Council of Western Australia
- In office 20 January 1934 – 21 May 1956
- Preceded by: John Ewing
- Succeeded by: Graham MacKinnon
- Constituency: South-West Province

Personal details
- Born: 23 November 1892 York, Western Australia
- Died: 9 February 1966 (aged 73) Subiaco, Western Australia
- Party: Nationalist (to 1945); Liberal (from 1945)

Leslie "Les" Craig CMG (23 November 1892 – 9 February 1966) was an Australian politician who was a member of the Legislative Council of Western Australia from 1934 to 1956, representing South-West Province.

Craig was born in York, a town in Western Australia's Wheatbelt region. He was educated at Hale School, in Perth, and later at Melbourne Grammar School. Craig enlisted in the Australian Imperial Force in October 1914, and served with the 10th Light Horse Regiment in the Gallipoli Campaign. He was wounded in action in August 1915, which resulted in the amputation of his left leg. After returning to Australia, Craig farmed at Balingup, where he had a Border Leicester sheep-stud, and later at Dardanup. At the 1927 state election, he contested the seat of Bunbury for the Nationalist Party, but lost to the sitting member, Labor's Frederick Withers.

In April 1928, Craig was elected to the Dardanup Road Board. He would serve as a councillor until November 1951, when he moved to Perth, including as chairman from 1947. Craig was elected to parliament in January 1934, winning a Legislative Council by-election caused by the death of John Ewing. After finishing Ewing's term, which expired in 1936, he was re-elected another three times, serving one eight-year term and two six-year terms before his eventual retirement in 1956. Craig worked as a company director after leaving parliament, and in the 1966 New Year Honours was made a Companion of the Order of St Michael and St George (CMG). He died in Perth later that year. Craig's wife, Frances Eileen (née Boyd), was a president of the Associated Country Women of the World, and his daughter-in-law, June Craig, was a member of parliament.
