= Mick Murray (politician) =

Australian politician

Mick Murray AM

Member of the Western Australian Legislative Assembly for Collie-Preston
- In office 10 February 2001 – 29 January 2021
- Preceded by: Hilda Turnbull
- Succeeded by: Jodie Hanns

Personal details
- Born: Michael Philip Murray; 26 November 1949 (age 76) Subiaco, Western Australia
- Party: Labor Party
- Profession: Mechanic

Michael Philip Murray (born 26 November 1949) is an Australian former politician who was a Labor member of the Western Australian Legislative Assembly from February 2001 to March 2021. He represented the electorate of Collie from 2001 to 2005 and the electorate of Collie-Preston from 2005 to 2021.

Growing up in the small town of Duranillin in the Shire of West Arthur, Murray attended the local primary school before moving to Collie with his parents and completing his education in local state schools. Murray completed his apprenticeship as a mechanic and worked in the North West of Western Australia before settling back in Collie to work in the coal mines.

Murray contested the seat of Collie twice before defeating the sitting member, Hilda Turnbull, in the 2001 election on a swing of 9.4 points and a two-party-preferred margin of 2.6 points.

The electorate of Collie was abolished in 2003 to become Collie-Wellington and Murray retained the seat in the 2005 election with a comfortable majority of 9.3%.

While in Parliament, Murray was a member of the Economics and Industry Standing Committee and Joint Standing Committee on Delegated Legislation committees. He has been a trustee of the Parliamentary superannuation fund from 2001 and a Deputy government whip from 2001 to 2005. He is the convenor of the Country Labor grouping within the Western Australian Labor Party.

Murray was appointed a Member of the Order of Australia in the 2026 King's Birthday Honours in recognition of his "significant service to the people and Parliament of Western Australia".

Western Australian Legislative Assembly
Preceded by Hilda Turnbull	Member for Collie; 2001–2005	Abolished
New seat	Member for Collie-Wellington; 2005–2008	Abolished
New seat	Member for Collie-Preston; 2008–2021	Succeeded by Jodie Hanns
