= Arthur Wilson (Western Australian politician) =

Australian politician

Arthur Wilson OBE

Member of the Western Australian Legislative Assembly for Collie
- In office 11 September 1908 – 17 February 1947
- Preceded by: John Ewing
- Succeeded by: Harry May

Personal details
- Born: Arthur Alan Wilson; 3 April 1864 Dalry, North Ayrshire, Scotland
- Died: 19 August 1948 (aged 84) Inglewood, Western Australia
- Resting place: Karrakatta Cemetery
- Party: Labor Party
- Occupation: Coal miner

Military service
- Allegiance: Australia
- Branch/service: Australian Army
- Years of service: 1917–1919

Arthur Alan Wilson OBE was an Australian politician. He was the Labor member for Collie in the Western Australian Legislative Assembly from 1908 to 1947.

He was also a writer and editor.
