= Shire of Capel =

Coordinates: 33°33′25″S 115°33′58″E

- Local government area
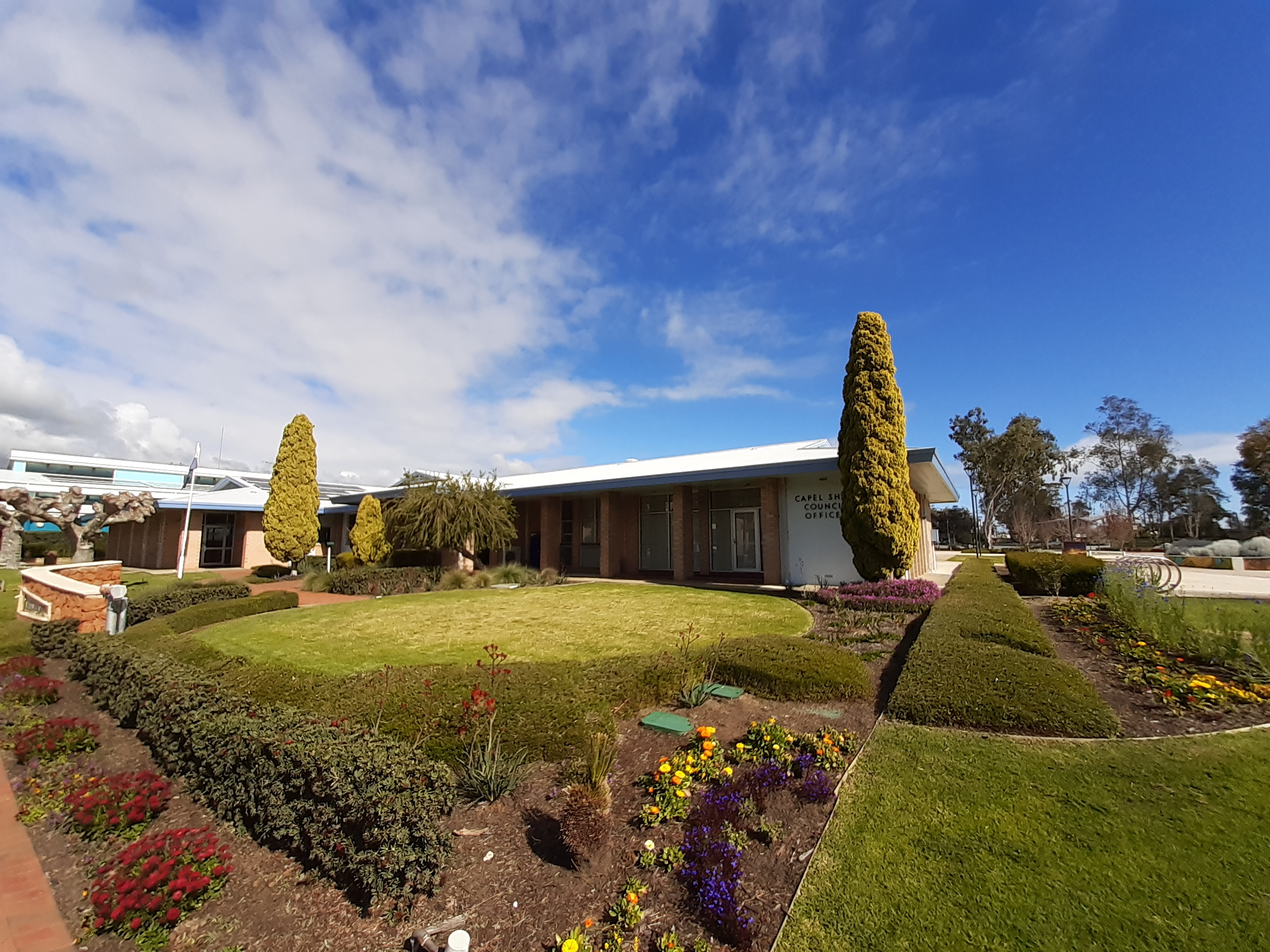
- The Capel Shire offices

- Interactive map of Shire of Capel
- Country: Australia
- State: Western Australia
- Region: South West
- Established: 1894
- Council seat: Capel

Government
  - Shire President: John Fergusson
  - State electorates: Collie-Preston; Bunbury; Vasse
  - Federal division: Forrest

Area
  - Total: 557.6 km^{2} (215.3 sq mi)

Population
  - Total: 18,175 (LGA 2021)
- Website: Shire of Capel
LGAs around Shire of Capel
Indian Ocean	Bunbury	Dardanup
Indian Ocean	Shire of Capel	Donnybrook- Balingup
Busselton	Busselton	Donnybrook- Balingup

The Shire of Capel is a local government area in the South West region of Western Australia, taking in the land between the cities of Bunbury and Busselton about 200 kilometres (124 mi) south of the state capital, Perth. The Shire covers an area of 557.6 square kilometres (215.3 sq mi), and its seat of government is the town of Capel.

The Shire of Capel has 29 km of beach frontage onto Geographe Bay including access at Forrest Beach, Peppermint Grove Beach, Minninup Beach and Dalyellup Beach. The eight kilometer stretch of Stirling Beach (commencing at the Capel River, north to the Minninup Beach access at Rich Road) has no public access points since all the adjacent land is privately owned.

According to the 2016 census figures, the population of the Shire of Capel was 17,123.

== History ==
Capel was initially constituted as the first Bunbury Road District on 15 June 1894 (as distinguished from the Bunbury Municipal District). On 26 July 1907, it was renamed to the Capel Road District, and on 1 July 1961, it became a shire under the Local Government Act 1960.

== Indigenous people ==
The Shire of Capel is located on the traditional land of the Wardandi (also spelled Wadandi) people of the Noongar nation.

== Wards ==
The Shire is no longer divided into wards and the nine councillors sit at large.

== Towns and localities ==
The towns and localities of the Shire of Capel with population and size figures based on the most recent Australian census:

Locality	Population	Area	Map
Boyanup	1,304 (SAL 2021)	70.6 km^{2} (27.3 sq mi)	
Capel	2,606 (SAL 2021)	66.4 km^{2} (25.6 sq mi)	
Capel River	136 (SAL 2021)	95.1 km^{2} (36.7 sq mi)	
Dalyellup	9,770 (SAL 2021)	16.5 km^{2} (6.4 sq mi)	
Elgin	133 (SAL 2021)	60.2 km^{2} (23.2 sq mi)	
Forrest Beach	34 (SAL 2021)	18 km^{2} (6.9 sq mi)	
Gelorup	2,255 (SAL 2021)	24.8 km^{2} (9.6 sq mi)	
Gwindinup	52 (SAL 2021)	15.3 km^{2} (5.9 sq mi)	
Ludlow *	132 (SAL 2021)	49.2 km^{2} (19.0 sq mi)	
North Boyanup	323 (SAL 2021)	38.3 km^{2} (14.8 sq mi)	
Peppermint Grove Beach	518 (SAL 2021)	1.6 km^{2} (0.62 sq mi)	
Stirling Estate	161 (SAL 2021)	28.5 km^{2} (11.0 sq mi)	
Stratham	793 (SAL 2021)	40.8 km^{2} (15.8 sq mi)	
The Plains	52 (SAL 2021)	64.4 km^{2} (24.9 sq mi)	

- (* indicates locality is only partially located within this shire)

== Heritage-listed places ==
As of 2023, 189 places are heritage-listed in the Shire of Capel, of which eleven are on the State Register of Heritage Places.
