= Jodie Hanns =

Australian politician (born 1972)

Jodie Hanns MLA

Member of the Western Australian Legislative Assembly for Collie-Preston
- Incumbent
- Assumed office 13 March 2021
- Preceded by: Mick Murray

Personal details
- Born: 9 April 1972 (age 53) Yarloop, Western Australia
- Party: Labor
- Website: www.jodiehanns.com.au

Jodie Louise Hanns (born 9 April 1972) is an Australian politician. She has been a Labor member of the Western Australian Legislative Assembly since the 2021 state election, representing Collie-Preston.

Hanns was born in Yarloop and moved to Collie in 2005. She was deputy principal of Collie Senior High School prior to entering politics. She had previously been a Shire of Collie councillor, chief executive officer of the Collie Chamber of Commerce and Industry, and board member of the Coal Miners' Welfare Board of Western Australia, the Collie Early Education Centre and St Brigid's School.

She was elected to the Legislative Assembly at the 2021 election, successfully replacing long-time Labor MP Mick Murray in the usually marginal seat. Labor won the election in a landslide statewide, and the local Liberal campaign was hampered by a controversial proposal to close the Collie power station, resulting in Hanns winning with 73.4% of the two-party preferred vote. In her election campaign Hanns received mentoring from Victorian politician, Katie Hall, through EMILY's List Australia.

In December 2022, she became a parliamentary secretary to Mark McGowan, the premier, treasurer, minister for public sector management, and the minister for federal–state relations.

In the 2025 Western Australian state election, she was re-elected to a second term.

Western Australian Legislative Assembly
Preceded by Mick Murray	Member for Collie-Preston; 2021–present	Incumbent
