= Ernest Henshaw =

Australian politician

Ernest Percival Henshaw (4 September 1870 – 11 June 1950) was a Labor Party politician who became a Member of the Western Australian Legislative Assembly.

Born in Geelong, Victoria on 4 September 1870, Henshaw was the son of cabinet maker John Henshaw and Frances née Lamb. Nothing is known of his childhood, except that he was apprenticed as a carpenter. By 1892 he was working as a carpenter and living in Clifton Hill, and on 17 August of that year he married Julia Emma Wildy. They had a son and two daughters.

Around 1894, Henshaw emigrated to Western Australia along with his brother and two sisters. Henshaw settled in Subiaco, working as a carpenter and joiner. He became active in the labour movement, becoming secretary of the Industrial Union of Carpenters and Joiners, and later president of the Coastal Trades and Labour Council. On 24 June 1904 he was elected to the Western Australian Legislative Assembly seat of Collie on a Labor ticket. He held the seat until the election of 27 October 1905, when he was defeated by John Ewing.

Henshaw held numerous official positions in the Australian Labor Party over the next five years. He contested the Australian House of Representatives seat of Perth in the election of 13 April 1910 but was unsuccessful. In 1911 he was heavily involved in the design and construction of the Perth Trades Hall, but later that year he left the party over a dispute.

During World War I Henshaw was the foreman carpenter for the Henderson Naval Base project. He later became a building surveyor, and in the late 1930s he helped form the Institute of Quantity Surveyors. In 1947 he rejoined the Labor party. He died at Subiaco on 11 June 1950, and was cremated at Karrakatta Cemetery.

His grandson, David Henshaw, was a member of the Victorian Legislative Council from 1982 to 1996, representing Geelong Province.
