= Tom Jones (Australian politician) =

Australian politician

The Honourable Tom Jones MLA OAM
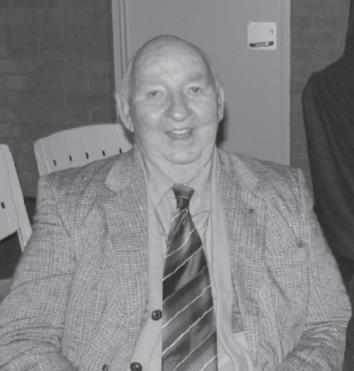
- In office 1968–1989
- Preceded by: Harry May
- Succeeded by: Hilda Turnbull
- Constituency: Collie

Personal details
- Born: Thomas Henry Jones; 2 March 1924 Donnybrook, Western Australia, Australia
- Died: 26 March 2014 (aged 90)
- Party: Labor Party

Thomas Henry Jones OAM (2 March 1924 – 26 March 2014) was an Australian politician and trade union leader. He served the Labor Party as member for Collie from 1968 until his retirement in 1989.

== Early life ==
Jones was born in Donnybrook, Western Australia. He worked as a call boy with the railways at the beginning of his career after moving to Collie in 1929. In 1947 he joined the coal mining industry and in 1951 was elected General Secretary of the Coal Miners Industrial Union - the youngest person ever elected to that position. He also served as Secretary of the Collie Coal Miners Combined Union. Tom Jones was also responsible as an industrial advocate for winning the 35-hour week as an Award Condition for Australian workers.

== Political life ==
Jones was elected as member for Collie-Wellington in 1968 and served as the Labor Member for 21 years. His retirement in 1989 saw the National Party candidate Hilda Turnbull become the member for Collie.

During his parliamentary career he was active in the policies of Government for the coal mining industry. He was Chairman of the State Parliamentary Party during the period of the John Tonkin Government. In 1974, with the Labor Party in Opposition, he was a member of the Tonkin Shadow Ministry.

== Medal of the Order of Australia ==
Jones holds the Medal of the Order of Australia, granted for his service as a member of the Western Australian Legislative Assembly, and for his service to the trade union movement and the welfare of the elderly.

== See also ==
- Tonkin Ministry
- Tonkin shadow ministry
