= Capel River =

River in Western Australia

Coordinates: 33°34′37″S 115°35′31″E

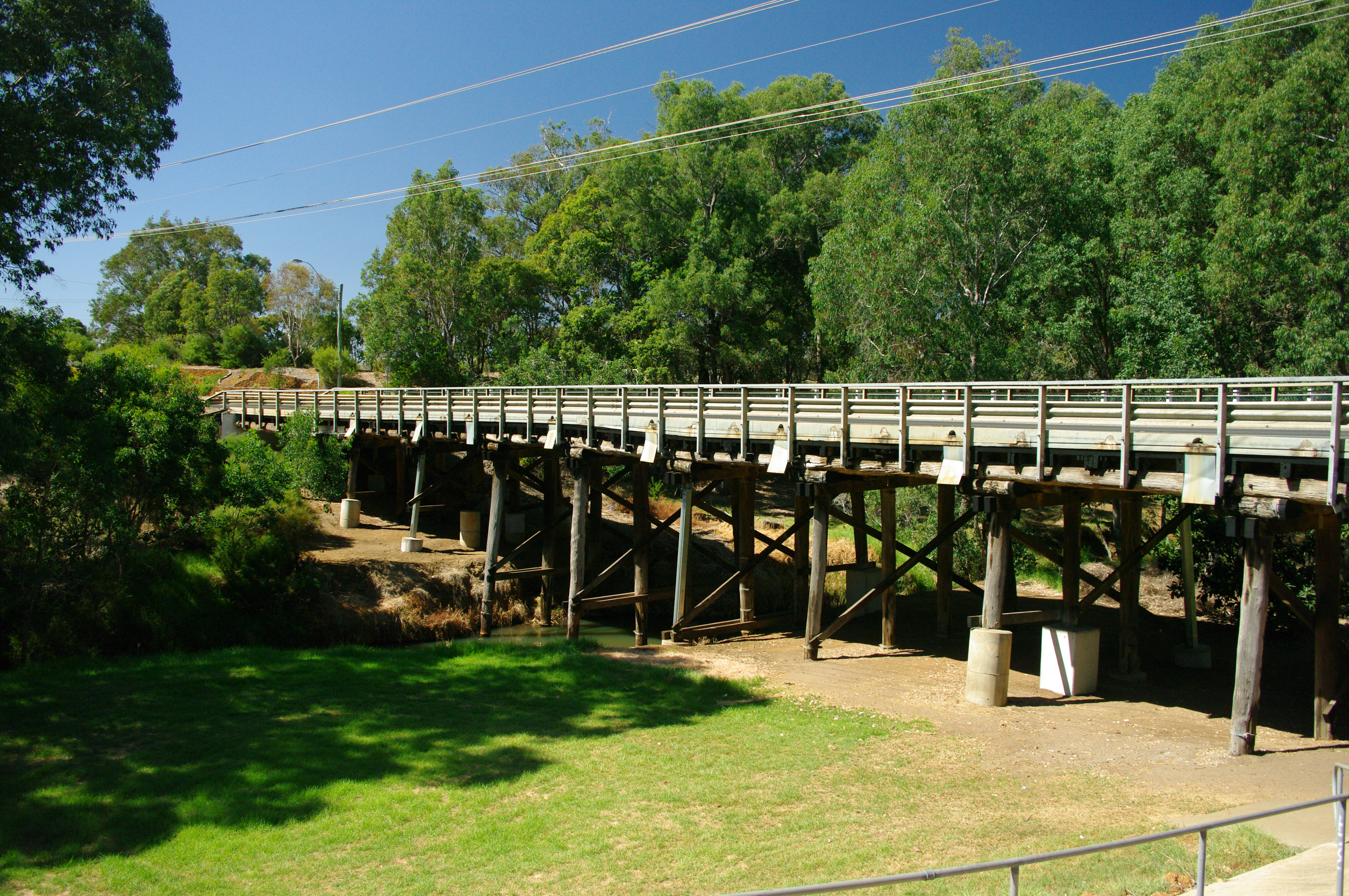
- Bridge over the Capel River at Capel

Location
- Country: Australia

Physical characteristics
- Source
  - location: Junction of Capel River North and Capel River South
  - elevation: 76 metres (249 ft)
- Mouth
  - location: Geographe Bay
  - elevation: sea level
- Length: 32 kilometres (20 mi)
- Basin size: 653 square kilometres (252 sq mi)

The Capel River is a river in the South West region of Western Australia that rises in the Darling Range east of Mullalyup, and flows into the Indian Ocean at Peppermint Grove Beach.

The Capel River is the largest in the Geographe catchment. It rises at the edge of the Darling Scarp and flows in a north-westerly direction across the northern part of the Blackwood plateau to the confluence of the Capel River North and Capel River South, near Goodwood.

The original inhabitants of the Capel basin were the Noongar Aboriginal people of the Wardandi dialect group. They called the river Coolingup. The river is said to have formed a border between different clans. Various stone artifacts were found along the river. The lower reaches of the Capel were of cultural importance for the Wardandi because they buried their dead there. A slaughter of the Wardandi occurred in 1841, by John Bussell and a number of settlers, following the murder of George Layman by the Wardandi elder Gaywal. The Wardandi later avoided the place.

The river was given its English name after Capel Carter Brockman (1839–1924), daughter of John Bussell (1803–1875), who was named after a Miss Capel Carter, a cousin of the Bussells in England with whom the Bussell family members corresponded.

The river crosses the Bussell Highway near Capel.

An artificial river mouth was cut through the sand dunes adjacent to the Stirling Wetlands in 1880 to allow it to flow directly into Geographe Bay.

The Capel river has six tributaries: Capel River North, Capel River South, Gynudup Brook, Camp Gully, Layman Gully and Maidenhair Gully.

The inaugural 2009 Ranger Outdoors Capel Descent was held in June 2009, consisting of a 15-kilometre (9 mi) part down river, part open ocean paddle along the Capel River and Geographe Bay.
