= Boyanup, Western Australia =

Boyanup
- Town
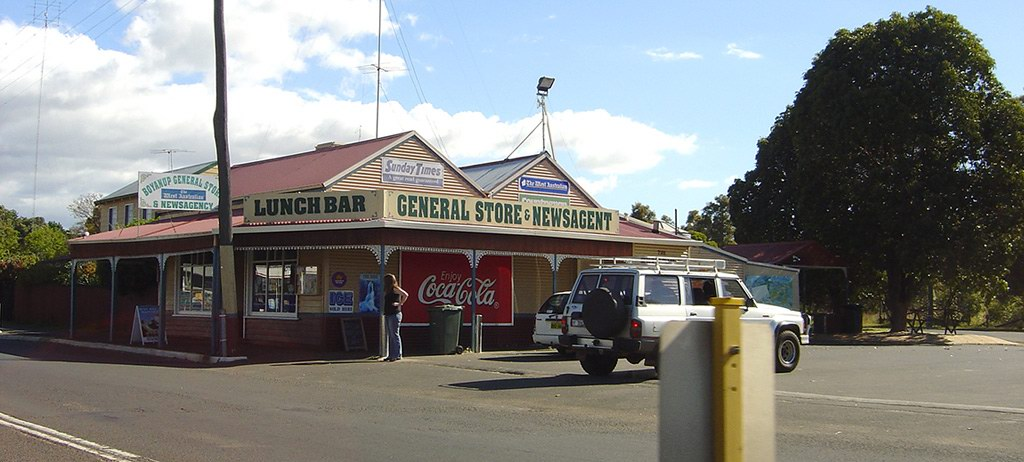
- Boyanup General Store

- Coordinates: 33°29′10″S 115°43′48″E
- Country: Australia
- State: Western Australia
- LGA(s): Shire of Capel
- Location: 195 km (121 mi) south of Perth; 18 km (11 mi) south east of Bunbury
- Established: 1894

Government
  - State electorate(s): Collie-Preston
  - Federal division(s): Forrest

Area
  - Total: 70.6 km^{2} (27.3 sq mi)
- Elevation: 40 m (130 ft)

Population
  - Total(s): 878 (UCL 2021)
- Postcode: 6237

Boyanup is a town on the South Western Highway in the South West agricultural region, 195 km south of Perth and 18 km south-east of Bunbury, Western Australia. The town is located on the Preston River.

Boyanup is a Noongar name, said to mean 'a place of quartz' as boya means 'rock' or 'stone'.

The first European in the area was Lieutenant Henry William Bunbury, who in December 1836 explored the route from Pinjarra to Busselton and thought it to be ideal for farming.

In 1845 Dublin solicitor James Bessonnet took up Location 54 in the Wellington District, consisting of 385 acres through which the Preston River flowed and the new road from Bunbury to the Blackwood had just been completed. The land also had a natural spring, sometimes known as Bessonnet Springs, and a permanent billabong. Bessonnet named his farm Boyanup. Bessonnet left the colony in 1849 aboard Despatch. Location 54 proved to be "too far from anywhere to be workable and eventually the bush took it back".

A road survey in 1869 shows the town name as "Boyinup". In 1894 the South Western Railway was completed from Perth to Bunbury. The Bunbury to Boyanup section was completed on 30 November 1887. The townsite was gazetted in 1894. A railway line extension between Boyanup and Bridgetown opened on 1 November 1898.

The population of the town was 198 (103 males and 95 females) in 1898.

The Yoganup North Mine site, located 5.1 kilometres (3 mi) north-west of the town and closed in 1997, is owned by Iluka Resources and where mineral sands were mined and separated.

== Sources ==
- Bunbury, Henry William St Pierre; Morrell, William Parker, eds. (1930), Early days in Western Australia: Being the letters and journal of Lieut. H.W. Bunbury, 21st fusiliers (PDF), London: Oxford University Press, OCLC 221171847, Wikidata Q136431240
