= Electoral district of Collie-Preston =

State electoral district of Western Australia

Collie-Preston Western Australia—Legislative Assembly
- Interactive map of electoral district boundaries from the 2025 state election
- State: Western Australia
- Dates current: 1901–present
- MP: Jodie Hanns
- Party: Labor
- Namesake: Collie, Preston River
- Electors: 33,150 (2025)
- Area: 4,164 km^{2} (1,607.7 sq mi)
- Demographic: Rural
- Coordinates: 33.43°S 115.92°E
Electorates around Collie-Preston:
Bunbury	Murray-Wellington	Central Wheatbelt
Bunbury; Indian Ocean	Collie-Preston	Roe
Vasse	Warren-Blackwood	Warren-Blackwood

Collie-Preston is a Legislative Assembly electorate in the state of Western Australia. While the seat was known as Collie for just over a century of its existence as an electorate, the seat was known as South West Mining from 1901 to 1904, and Collie-Wellington from 2005 to 2008. It is named for the South West coal mining town of Collie. While historically a very safe seat for the Labor Party, redistributions in 1988 and 2007 due to increases in the quota for country seats which had historically been malapportioned resulted in the seat incorporating surrounding rural shires which were hostile to Labor and thereby becoming more marginal.

== History ==
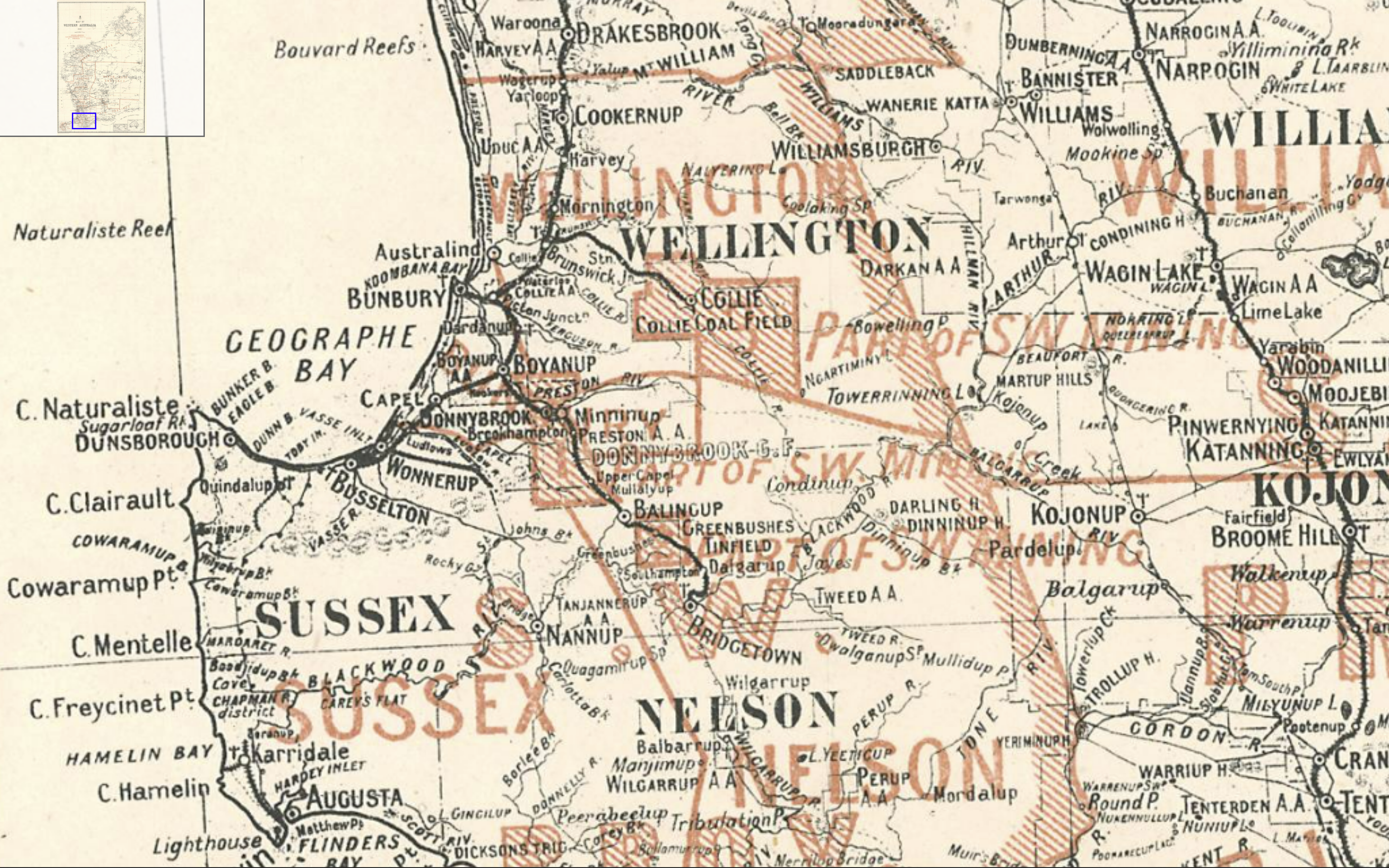
South West Mining in 1900, showing the three non-contiguous parts of the district

Collie was originally created as the seat of "South West Mining" in the Constitution Act Amendment Act 1899, the last redistribution of seats to require a modification of the Constitution. It was first contested at the 1901 election. The district in 1900 consisted of three non-contiguous parts: one centred on the Collie coalfields, one centred on the Greenbushes tinfields, and one centred on the Donnybrook goldfields.

In 1904, it was renamed "Collie" with almost no changes to its boundaries. In the Redistribution of Seats Act 1911, its boundaries were so unusually contorted by the then-Liberal government, which was accused of trying to lock Labor votes in Premier Frank Wilson's marginal seat of Sussex behind Collie's boundaries, that the Kalgoorlie Miner and other newspapers used the seat's map as an effective mascot for the bill. However, the boundaries remained unchanged until a later redistribution ahead of the 1930 election.

The seat changed hands three times between the Liberal member John Ewing and his Labor rivals, but the seat was securely Labor from the 1908 election and for 81 years continuously remained a Labor seat, with only three members during that time—Arthur Wilson until 1947, then Harry May until 1968 and Tom Jones until 1989.

In 1986, the seat had 9,410 enrolled voters compared with an average of 13,796 statewide and over 28,000 in some metropolitan electorates such as Joondalup and Murdoch. The Burke Labor government's Acts Amendment (Electoral Reform) Act 1987, passed with National Party support, increased metropolitan representation from 29 to 34 out of 57 seats, and the 1988 redistribution which resulted in Collie gaining parts of Dale and Warren combined with a significant statewide swing against the Labor Party delivered the seat to the Nationals' Dr Hilda Turnbull, who held the seat until the 2001 election. Labor's Mick Murray, head of the Country Labor grouping in Western Australia, gained the seat on his third attempt with a margin of 34 votes.

In the 2003 redistribution, the seat was renamed Collie-Wellington when it lost its southern and eastern sections and incorporated large sections of Waroona and Harvey which had been part of Murray-Wellington. The 2007 redistribution renamed the seat Collie-Preston and largely reversed the 2003 redistribution, but added the coastal section of the Shire of Capel which brought in residents on the fringes of metropolitan Bunbury. This slashed Murray's margin from a fairly safe 9.3 percent to an extremely marginal 0.8 percent.

Mick Murray retained the seat at the 2005, 2008 and 2013 elections. A redistribution ahead of the 2017 election saw Collie-Preston gain Donnybrook-Balingup Shire from Warren-Blackwood and Clifton Park from Bunbury while it lost Dalyellup to Bunbury. This erased Murray's paper-thin majority of 0.1 percent and made Collie-Preston notionally Liberal, on a margin of 2.9 percent. However, Murray retained the seat on a massive swing of 17.6 percent. Murray retired in 2021, and Jodie Hanns easily retained the seat for Labor. She now sits on a margin of 23.4 percent, Labor's safest outside the Perth-Mandurah axis.

== Geography ==
Collie-Preston presently includes the Shires of Collie, Capel, Donnybrook-Balingup and Dardanup. It includes the Bunbury outer suburbs of Eaton and Millbridge, the towns of Balingup, Boyanup, Burekup, Capel, Collie, Dardanup, Donnybrook and Kirup.

The seat has changed many times through its history. In the 1950s, the seat was limited to the region around Collie itself and mining areas within the Shire of West Arthur. By 1968, the seat consisted of the Shires of Collie, Donnibrook, Balingup and Boyup Brook districts, and from 1976 to 1982 also included Dardanup. The 1988 redistribution added Boddington from the abolished Dale, as well as the Greenbushes district from Warren. The 1994 redistribution added Dardanup and eastern Capel, including Boyanup but excluding Eaton and the coastal regions. Ahead of the state election, only Collie and Dardanup were retained, with the seat gaining Waroona and most of Harvey (excluding Australind and other urban districts which were part of Leschenault).

The 2007 redistribution, which took effect at the 2008 election, brought back Dardanup and Donnybrook-Balingup, but also added Capel from the abolished Capel district, and the Bunbury suburb of Eaton from the abolished Leschenault. This change rendered Collie a marginal Labor seat, with Labor's 81.7% two-party-preferred vote across the six booths in the town of Collie contrasting with the Liberals' 60.1% two-party-preferred vote across the three outer Bunbury booths. With the rural districts generally historically preferring Liberal candidates—62.7% at the 2005 election and 61.9% at the 2007 federal election—the seat has been rated by Antony Green as marginal Labor with a margin of 0.9% going into the election.

== Members for Collie ==
South-West Mining
Member	Party	Term
John Ewing	Ministerial	1901–1904
Collie
Ernest Henshaw	Labor	1904–1905
John Ewing	Ministerial	1905–1908
Arthur Wilson	Labor	1908–1947
Harry May	Labor	1947–1968
Tom Jones	Labor	1968–1989
Dr Hilda Turnbull	National	1989–2001
Mick Murray	Labor	2001–2005
Collie-Wellington
Mick Murray	Labor	2005–2008
Collie-Preston
Mick Murray	Labor	2008–2021
Jodie Hanns	Labor	2021–present

== Election results ==
2025 Western Australian state election: Collie-Preston
Party	Candidate	Votes	%	±%
Labor	Jodie Hanns	11,361	40.6	−21.0
Liberal	Matt Sharp	6,393	22.9	+8.5
National	Cam Parsons	3,571	12.8	+3.8
One Nation	Jess Adams	2,076	7.4	+5.4
Greens	Robert Mann	1,919	6.9	+2.8
Legalise Cannabis	Paul Gullan	1,142	4.1	+2.3
Shooters, Fishers, Farmers	Joshua Wray Coffey	764	2.7	−0.2
Christians	Norm Wiese	736	2.6	+2.6
Total formal votes		27,962	95.2	−0.8
Informal votes		1,412	4.8	+0.8
Turnout		29,374	88.6	+5.2
Two-party-preferred result
Labor	Jodie Hanns	15,177	54.3	−19.0
Liberal	Matt Sharp	12,760	45.7	+19.0
Labor hold		Swing	−19.0	
