= Capel, Western Australia =

Capel Coolingup (Noongar)
- Town
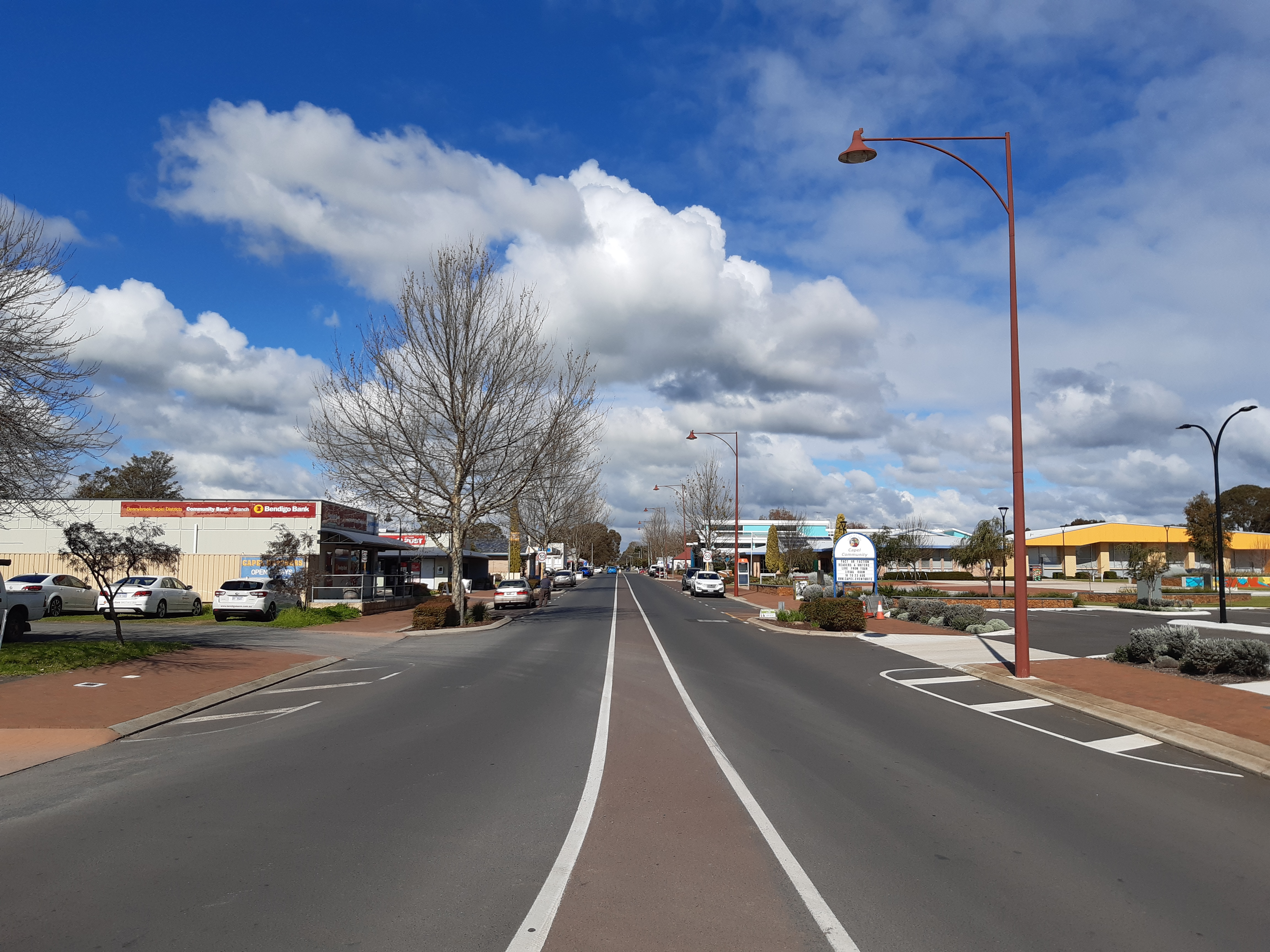
- Forrest Road in Capel

- Interactive map of Capel
- Coordinates: 33.557°S 115.57°E
- Country: Australia
- State: Western Australia
- LGA: Shire of Capel
- Location: 212 km (132 mi) south of Perth; 17 km (11 mi) south of Bunbury; 23 km (14 mi) north of Busselton
- Established: 1897

Government
  - State electorate: Collie-Preston
  - Federal division: Forrest

Area
  - Total: 66.4 km^{2} (25.6 sq mi)
- Elevation: 19 m (62 ft)

Population
  - Total: 2,402 (UCL 2021)
- Postcode: 6271

Capel is a town in the South West region of Western Australia, located 212 kilometres (132 mi) south of Perth and midway between Bunbury and Busselton. The town is located on the Capel River and is approximately 19 metres (62 ft) above sea level.

== History ==
The Capel area was originally inhabited by the Wardandi Noongar people.

Colonists visited the region early in the history of colonial Western Australia. The Capel River was visited by Frederick Ludlow in 1834, but it was not given an English name until the Bussell family settled in the area soon afterwards. The name honours Capel Carter Brockman (1839–1924), daughter of John Bussell (1803–1875), herself named after a Miss Capel Carter, a cousin of the Bussells in England with whom Bussell family members corresponded. In the 1830s a number of settlers followed the Bussells into the area, and both James Stirling and John Hutt, (the first two Governors of Western Australia) took up land in the region.

Plans to establish a townsite in the area were first mooted in 1844, but the site was not surveyed until the 1870s and lots were not sold until 1897. Initially the town was named Coolingnup, which is the Noongar name for the place; the name was changed to Capel in 1899.

== Climate ==
The climate is hot-summer Mediterranean climate (Köppen: Csa), at a certain distance from the headquarters, Forrest Beach has the warm-summer version as in Busselton or southern California (Csb), delimiting the northern limit of the second climatic zone on the Australian coast.

Capel has hot dry summers and cool wet winters. Daily temperatures range from 13 °C to 40 °C in summer, and from 5 °C to 27 °C in winter. Average annual rainfall is about 830 mm.

== Demographics ==
The population of the town was 91 (44 males and 47 females) in 1898. According to the 2016 census figures, the population of the Town of Capel was 2,509, and the population of the Shire of Capel was 17,123.

== Economy ==
Historically, Capel is a farming area; traditional agricultural pursuits include dairy and beef. In recent times, Capel has become popular for hobby farms, and a number of innovative agricultural pursuits have been introduced, including alpacas, viticulture, aquaculture and growing of blue gums. There is also some mining of mineral sands in the Shire, and tourism is increasingly important to the Shire's economy.

Westralian Sands was established in 1954 but commenced operations in 1959 when it started mining and processing the Yoganup deposit just north of the town. Another company, RGC, operated a mine to the south of the town. In 1998 both companies merged to form Iluka Resources which continues to operate ilmenite mines around the area and produce synthetic rutile at the processing facility to the north of the town along the Bussell Highway.
