= List of libraries in Western Australia =

This is a list of libraries in Western Australia.

- State Library of Western Australia, in the Alexander Library Building.
- J S Battye Library (division of state library)

== Academic libraries ==
- Curtin University Library (Curtin University)
- ECU Library (Edith Cowan University)
- Geoffrey Bolton Library (Murdoch University)
- Reid Library (University of Western Australia)
- Stanley College Library (Stanley College)

== Public libraries ==
Public libraries in Western Australia are operated by the local governments in which they are located.

A number of libraries are grouped into library consortia, so they can share collections easily and members from one library can borrow from any other in the consortium without needing separate memberships.

=== Regional WA Library Consortium ===
These libraries are part of the Regional WA Library Consortium, the largest library consortium by geographic coverage in Australia.

- City of Albany Libraries (City of Albany)
- Ashburton Shire Libraries (Shire of Ashburton)
- Bindoon Public Library (Shire of Chittering)
- Brookton Public Library (Shire of Brookton)
- Broomehill-Tambellup Shire Libraries (Shire of Broomehill-Tambellup)
- Bruce Rock Public Library (Shire of Bruce Rock)
- Coolgardie Shire Libraries (Shire of Coolgardie)
- Cranbrook Shire Libraries (Shire of Cranbrook)
- Denmark Public Library (Shire of Denmark)
- Dumbleyung Shire Libraries (Shire of Dumbleyung)
- East Pilbara Shire Libraries (Shire of East Pilbara)
- Esperance Public Library (Shire of Esperance)
- Gingin Shire Libraries (Shire of Gingin)
- Gnowangerup Shire Libraries (Shire of Gnowangerup)
- Harold Williams Memorial Library (Shire of Mukinbudin)
- Jerramungup Shire Libraries (Shire of Jerramungup)
- Katanning Public Library (Shire of Katanning)
- Kojonup Public Library (Shire of Kojonup)
- Koorda Public Library (Shire of Koorda)
- Laverton Public Library (Shire of Laverton)
- Moora Public Library (Shire of Moora)
- Mount Barker Public Library (Shire of Plantagenet)
- Mt Marshall Shire Libraries (Shire of Mt Marshall)
- Murray Public Library (Shire of Murray)
- Pingrup Public Library (Shire of Kent)
- Ravensthorpe Shire Libraries (Shire of Ravensthorpe)
- Southern Cross Public Library (Shire of Yilgarn)
- Toodyay Shire Libraries (Shire of Toodyay)
- Wagin Public Library (Shire of Wagin)
- Williams Public Library (Shire of Williams)

=== South West Library Consortium ===
These libraries are part of the South West Library Consortium.

- Boddington Library (Shire of Boddington)
- Boyup Brook Community Resource Centre (Boyup Brook)
- Bridgetown Regional Library (Shire of Bridgetown-Greenbushes)
- Brookton Public Library (Brookton)
- Bunbury Public Libraries (Bunbury)
- City of Busselton Public Libraries (City of Busselton)
- Shire of Capel Libraries (Shire of Capel)
- Collie Public Library (Shire of Collie)
- Dardanup Public Libraries (Shire of Dardanup)
- Donnybrook-Balingup Shire Council Libraries
- Harvey Shire Libraries (Shire of Harvey)
- Manjimup Shire Council Libraries (Shire of Manjimup)
- Nannup Library (Shire of Nannup)
- Waroona Public Library (Shire of Waroona)

=== Western Suburbs Regional Library Network ===
These libraries are part of the Western Suburbs Regional Library Consortium.

- The Grove Library (Peppermint Grove, Town of Mosman Park, Town of Cottlesloe)
- Grove Community History Library (Peppermint Grove, Town of Mosman Park, Town of Cottlesloe)
- City of Nedlands Library Service (Nedlands)
- Claremont Public Library (Claremont)
- Evelyn H Parker Library (Subiaco)

=== Local government public libraries ===
==== Public Libraries in Greater Perth ====
These are public libraries located in Perth or the Perth metropolitan region.

- City of Armadale Libraries (City of Armadale)
- Bassendean Memorial Library (Bassendean)
- City of Bayswater Libraries (Bayswater)
- Ruth Faulkner Library and Belmont Museum (City of Belmont)
- Town of Cambridge Library (Town of Cambridge)
- City of Canning Public Libraries (City of Canning)
- Cockburn Libraries (City of Cockburn)
- City of Fremantle Library (City of Fremantle)
- City of Gosnells Libraries (City of Gosnells)
- City of Joondalup Libraries (City of Joondalup)
- City of Kalamunda Libraries (Kalamunda)
- Darius Wells Library and Resource Centre (City of Kwinana)
- City of Mandurah Libraries (City of Mandurah)
- City of Melville Libraries (City of Melville)
- Shire of Mundaring Libraries (Shire of Mundaring)
- City of Perth Library (Perth) (previously the Swan River Mechanics' Institute)
- City of Rockingham Council Libraries (City of Rockingham)
- Byford Public Library (Shire of Serpentine-Jarrahdale)
- City of South Perth Libraries (City of South Perth)
- Stirling Libraries (City of Stirling)
- City of Swan Libraries (Swan)
- Victoria Park Library (Victoria Park)
- City of Vincent Library (City of Vincent)
- City of Wanneroo Libraries (City of Wanneroo)

==== Public Libraries in the Wheatbelt ====
- Corrigin Public Library (Corrigan)
- Cunderdin Public Library (Shire of Cunderdin)
- Dalwallinu Library (Shire of Dalwallinu)
- Dandaragan Shire Libraries (Shire of Dandaragan)
- Dowerin Community Resource Centre (Shire of Dowerin)
- Kellerberrin Library (Shire of Kellerberrin)
- Kulin Public Library (Kulin)
- Lake Grace Shire Council Libraries (Shire of Lake Grace)
- Merredin Regional Library (Merredin)
- Narembeen Library (Shire of Narembeen)
- Northam Region Library (Northam)
- Pingelly Public Library (Shire of Pingelly)
- Quairading Library (Shire of Quairading)
- R.W. (Bob) Farr Memorial Library (Narrogin)
- Trayning Public Library (Shire of Trayning)
- Victoria Plains Shire Council Libraries (Shire of Victoria Plains)
- Wandering Public Library (Shire of Wandering)
- Westonia Library (Shire of Westonia)
- Wongan Hills Public Library (Shire of Wongan-Billidu)

==== Others ====
- Broome Library and Information Service (Broome)
- Coorow Shire Libraries (Shire of Coorow)
- Cue Public Library (Cue)
- Darkan Public Library (Shire of West Arthur)
- Dongara Library (Shire of Irwin)
- Exmouth Public Library (Shire of Exmouth)
- Gascoyne Junction Community Resource Centre (Shire of Upper Gascoyne)
- Goomalling Public Library (Shire of Goomalling)
- Halls Creek Shire Libraries (Shire of Halls Creek)
- Karratha Public Libraries (City of Karratha)
- Nyabing Public Library (Shire of Kent)
- Norseman Public Library (Shire of Dundas)
- Shire of Carnamah Libraries (Shire of Carnamah)
- West Kimberley Public Library and Information Services (Shire of Derby-West Kimberley)
- William Grundt Memorial Library (Kalgoorlie)
- Kondinin Shire (Shire of Kondinin)
- Hyden Library (Hyden)
- Kupungarri Community Library (Kupungarri)
- Leinster Community Library (Shire of Leinster)
- Leonora Library (Shire of Leonora)
- Meekatharra Public Library (Meekatharra)
- Menzies Library (Menzies)
- Mingenew Public Library (Shire of Mingenew)
- Morawa Public Library (Shire of Morawa)
- Mount Magnet Public Library (Shire of Mount Magnet)
- Murchison Public Library (Shire of Murchison)
- Northampton Shire Libraries (Shire of Northampton)
- Nungarin Public Library (Shire of Nungarin)
- Perenjori Shire Council Libraries (Shire of Perenjori)
- Sandstone Library (Shire of Sandstone)
- Tammin Shire Library (Shire of Tammin)
- Three Springs Library (Shire of Three Springs)
- Town of Port Hedland Libraries (Town of Port Hedland)
- Wiluna Library (Shire of Wiluna)

=== External territories with libraries managed by the WA Government ===
- Christmas Island Public Library (Christmas Island)
- Cocos Home Island Public Library (Cocos / Keeling Island)
- Rottnest Island Public Library (Rottnest Island)
- Shark Bay Libraries (Shark Bay)

== Special libraries ==
- Murdoch University Veterinary Library (Murdoch University)

=== Historical libraries ===
- The Royal Western Australian Historical Society Library

=== Legal libraries ===
- Western Australian Parliamentary Library and Research Services

== See also ==
- Mechanics' institutes of Australia
