= Electoral district of Mount Marshall =

Former state electoral district of Western Australia

Mount Marshall Western Australia—Legislative Assembly
- State: Western Australia
- Dates current: 1930–1989
- Namesake: Mount Marshall

Mount Marshall was an electoral district of the Legislative Assembly in the Australian state of Western Australia from 1930 to 1989.

== History ==
The seat was created under the Redistribution of Seats Act 1929 and was first contested in the 1930 state election. It was historically very safe for the Country Party, and its member from 1967 to 1983, Ray McPharlin, led the party between 1974 and 1975. He lost the leadership after the party walked out of a coalition with Charles Court and the Liberal Party on 16 May 1975, only to ultimately return under considerable pressure. In 1978, McPharlin joined a breakaway party, known as the National Party (NP), led by future Deputy Premier Hendy Cowan, and won the seat under this banner at the 1980 election. However, in 1982 he rejoined the National Country Party, who lost the seat for the first time in its history to the Liberals. It was recaptured by Mort Schell at the 1986 election, however, the seat was dissolved in a redistribution under the Electoral Districts Act 1947 on 29 April 1988 into the neighbouring seats of Avon and Merredin.

== Geography ==
Mount Marshall was located in the Eastern Wheatbelt region and, while its exact composition varied over time, it was remarkably stable over its existence when compared with neighbouring electoral districts.

It included the following local government areas:

- Dalwallinu (northeast)
- Dowerin (1955 onwards)
- Kellerberrin
- Koorda
- Mount Marshall
- Mukinbudin
- Nungarin
- Tammin
- Trayning
- Wyalkatchem

In later years, as populations in the area declined, the District absorbed the rest of Dalwallinu (1966) and the Shires of Cunderdin (1972), Quairading (1972), Goomalling (1977), Wongan-Ballidu (1977), Westonia (1982) and parts of Yilgarn (1982).

== Members ==
Member	Party	Term
John Lindsay	Country	1930–1933
Frederick Warner	Ind. Country	1933–1936
Frederick Warner	Country	1936–1943
Hugh Leslie	Country	1943–1950
George Cornell	Country	1950–1967
Ray McPharlin	Country	1967–1975
Ray McPharlin	National Country	1975–1978
Ray McPharlin	National (WA)	1978–1982
Ray McPharlin	National Country	1982–1983
Bill McNee	Liberal	1983–1986
Mort Schell	National	1986–1989
