= Walgoolan, Western Australia =

Town in the Wheatbelt region of Western Australia

Walgoolan
- Town
- Interactive map of Walgoolan
- Coordinates: 31°23′00″S 118°34′00″E
- Country: Australia
- State: Western Australia
- LGA: Shire of Westonia
- Location: 290 km (180 mi) ENE of Perth; 8 km (5.0 mi) E of Burracoppin
- Established: 1923

Government
  - State electorate: Central Wheatbelt
  - Federal division: O'Connor

Area
  - Total: 527.9 km^{2} (203.8 sq mi)
- Elevation: 329 m (1,079 ft)

Population
  - Total: 64 (SAL 2021)
- Postcode: 6422

Walgoolan is a small town located in the eastern Wheatbelt region of Western Australia. It is situated between Merredin and Bodallin along the Great Eastern Highway.

Originating as a railway siding on the main eastern railway, Walgoolan was established between 1895 and 1899. Land was set aside for a townsite in 1913 and lots were surveyed in 1922. The townsite was gazetted in 1923.

The name of the town is Aboriginal in origin and means place where the short bushes grow.

Following World War I, nearly 100 settlers took up land in the area, which were cleared and planted with cereal crops, mostly wheat. The town was a thriving community with five schools, tennis courts, a cricket club, Country Women's Association and Wheat Growers Union.

Tenders for the construction of a brick and cement hall in the town were called for in 1926. The hall was opened and being used for recitals and other community events the following year. The Westonia Road board held a referendum among the ratepayers to decide whether £500 of funding should be used to purchase the hall. The proposal was carried by a large majority.

In 1932 the Wheat Pool of Western Australia announced that the town would have two grain elevators, each fitted with an engine, installed at the railway siding.

In 1932, 30,000 emus migrated to the farm land around Walgoolan nearby, which would go on to start the Emu War, which changed the face of Australian farming, ravaging crops and destroying fences. The Australian military was deployed to fight these emus at the request of the farmers, in an unsuccessful attempt to use machine guns to lower the population of emus.

The Great Depression and a succession of droughts took their toll on the area; by 1940 only one shop was left and the townsite was abandoned soon after. By 2010 only 10 families remain in the district.

A gazebo was erected in the town in 2010 to commemorate the early settlers and launch the book East of the Fence; the gazebo contains historic photographs and a list of the names of the pioneers.
