= Nangeenan, Western Australia =

Nangeenan
- Town
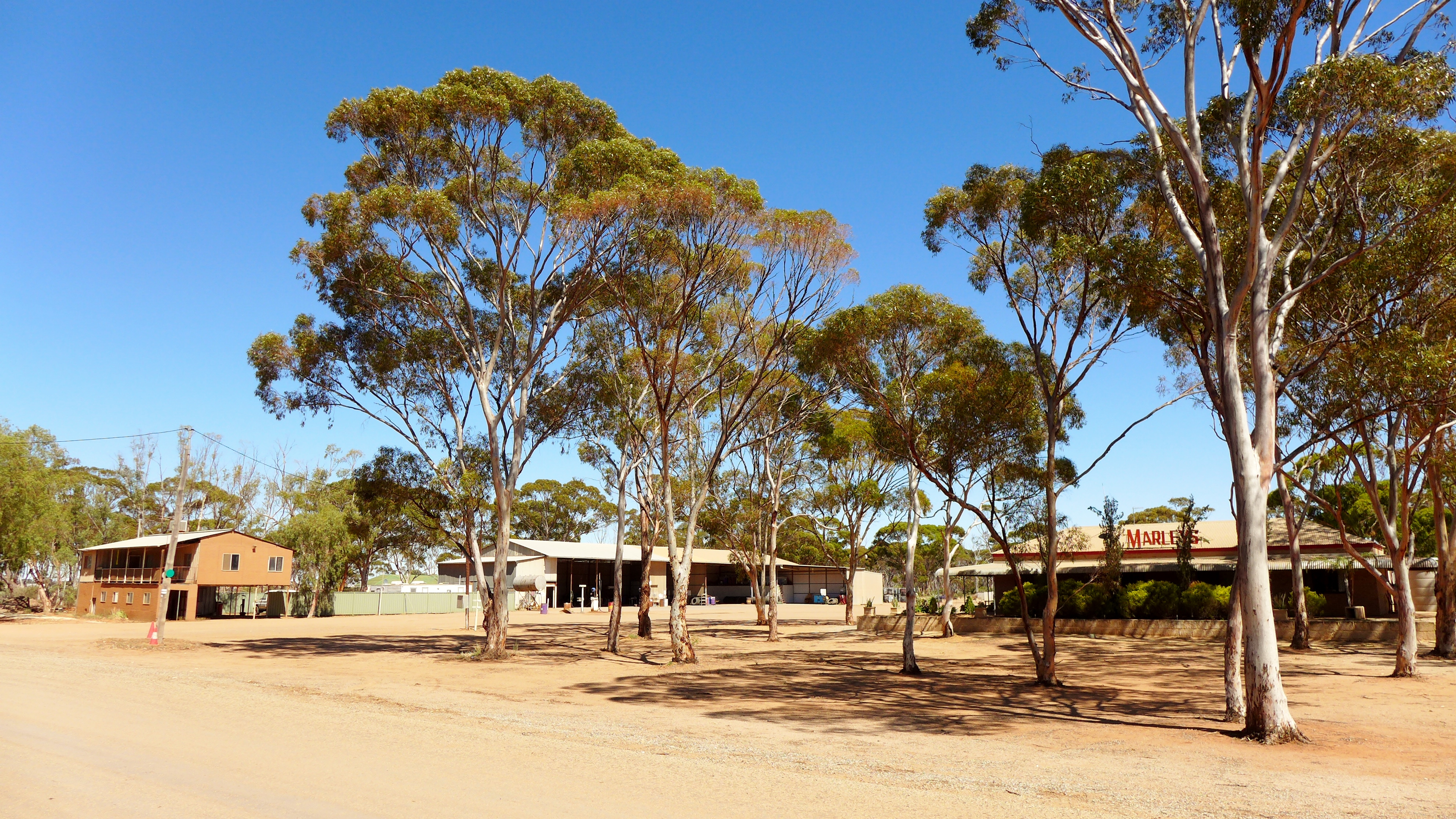
- View of the Marleys Transport depot at Nangeenan in December 2014

- Interactive map of Nangeenan
- Coordinates: 31°32′S 118°10′E
- Country: Australia
- State: Western Australia
- LGA: Shire of Merredin

Government
  - State electorate: Central Wheatbelt
  - Federal division: Durack

Area
  - Total: 184.6 km^{2} (71.3 sq mi)

Population
  - Total: 75 (SAL 2021)
- Postcode: 6414

Nangeenan is a small town west of Merredin on the Great Eastern Highway, in the Wheatbelt region of Western Australia. A railway siding was opened by the Western Australian Government Railways on the Eastern railway line in 1898. People moved into the town shortly after.

Nangeenan was officially recognised as a town in 1905.

It has a local hall which was built in 1912. It has been in use since around the time of World War I. During the same era, Nangeenan was the site of a "state farm", a term used at the time for a research station of the Department of Agriculture.
