= Division of O'Connor =

Australian federal electoral division

Coordinates: 29.620°S 123.668°E

O'Connor Australian House of Representatives Division
- Interactive map of electorate boundaries from the 2025 federal election
- Created: 1980
- MP: Rick Wilson
- Party: Liberal
- Namesake: Charles Yelverton O'Connor
- Electors: 117,954 (2022)
- Area: 1,126,937 km^{2} (435,112.8 sq mi)
- Demographic: Rural
Electorates around O'Connor:
Durack	Durack	Lingiari (NT)
Durack	O'Connor	Grey (SA)
Bullwinkel; Canning; Forrest	Indian Ocean	Grey (SA)

The Division of O'Connor is an Australian electoral division in the state of Western Australia. It is one of Western Australia's three rural seats, and one of the largest electoral constituencies in the world.

== Geography ==
Since 1984, federal electoral division boundaries in Australia have been determined at redistributions by a redistribution committee appointed by the Australian Electoral Commission. Redistributions occur for the boundaries of divisions in a particular state, and they occur every seven years, or sooner if a state's representation entitlement changes or when divisions of a state are malapportioned.

== History ==
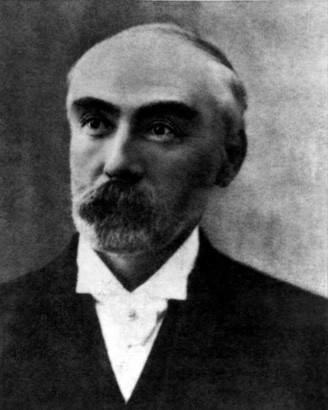
Charles Yelverton O'Connor, the division's namesake

The division was named after Charles Yelverton O'Connor, the Engineer-in-Chief of Western Australia most famously known for designing the Fremantle Harbour and the Goldfields Pipeline. The division was proclaimed at the redistribution of 28 February 1980, and was first contested at the 1980 federal election. It has always been a rural seat.

For its first three decades, it took in large portions of the Mid West, Wheatbelt and Great Southern regions of Western Australia with major population centres in Geraldton and Albany. The division was significantly altered by a redistribution in 2008, taking effect at the 2010 election. The other large country seat in Western Australia, Kalgoorlie, already the largest single-member electorate in the world, needed to expand in size. However, it soon became apparent that redistributing Kalgoorlie would have made it all but impossible to reconfigure O'Connor in a way that would have had any rational basis. Ultimately, it was decided to abolish Kalgoorlie and push O'Connor well to the east to take in most of Kalgoorlie's former southern portion, including the city of Kalgoorlie itself. The northern portion of the old O'Connor was transferred to the new seat of Durack.

In August 2021, the Australian Electoral Commission (AEC) announced that O'Connor would receive the Wheatbelt Shires of Bruce Rock, Cunderdin, Kellerberrin, Koorda, Kulin, Merredin, Mount Marshall, Mukinbudin, Narembeen, Nungarin, Quairading, Tammin, Trayning, Westonia, Wyalkatchem and Yilgarn and the Mid West Shire of Wiluna from the seat of Durack, while it would also receive the Wheatbelt Shire of Beverley from the seat of Pearce and the South West Shires of Boddington and Nannup from the seats of Canning and Forrest, respectively. These boundary changes took place at the 2022 election.

It now includes the Great Southern region (Albany, Broomehill-Tambellup, Cranbrook, Denmark, Gnowangerup, Jerramungup, Katanning, Kent, Kojonup, Plantagenet, and Woodanilling), the Goldfields-Esperance region (Coolgardie, Dundas, Esperance, Kalgoorlie-Boulder, Laverton, Leonora, Menzies, Ngaanyatjarraku, and Ravensthorpe), the Mid West Shire of Wiluna, parts of the South-West region (Boyup Brook, Bridgetown-Greenbushes, Collie, Manjimup and Nannup), and the southern portion of the Wheatbelt (Beverley, Boddington, Brookton, Bruce Rock, Corrigin, Cuballing, Cunderdin, Dumbleyung, Kellerberrin, Kondinin, Koorda, Kulin, Lake Grace, Merredin, Mount Marshall, Mukinbudin, Narembeen, Narrogin, Nungarin, Pingelly, Quairading, Tammin, Trayning, Wagin, Wandering, West Arthur, Westonia, Wickepin, Williams, Wiluna, Wyalkatchem and Yilgarn).

The seat has always been held by a conservative party. When it was created, its demographics suggested that it should have been held by the National Country Party, despite its large notional Liberal majority. However, severe conflict between rival branches of the state National Party allowed Liberal Wilson Tuckey to take the seat on Labor preferences. Tuckey held it without serious difficulty until his defeat at the 2010 election by Nationals WA candidate Tony Crook with a large swing. However, the Liberals regained the seat at the 2013 election.

== Members ==
Image	Member	Party	Term	Notes
	Wilson Tuckey (1935–)	Liberal	18 October 1980 – 21 August 2010	Served as minister under Howard. Lost seat
	Tony Crook (1959–)	Nationals WA	21 August 2010 – 5 August 2013	Retired
	Rick Wilson (1966–)	Liberal	7 September 2013 – present	Incumbent

== Election results ==
2025 Australian federal election: O'Connor
Party	Candidate	Votes	%	±%
Liberal	Rick Wilson	34,488	34.45	−10.05
Labor	Darren Moir	21,080	21.06	−5.68
National	Heidi Tempra	12,812	12.80	+12.80
One Nation	Gemma Johnston	11,053	11.04	+4.14
Greens	Giz Watson	10,014	10.00	−0.89
Legalise Cannabis	Philip Arnatt	5,394	5.39	+5.39
Christians	Deonne Kingsford	3,077	3.07	+0.27
Trumpet of Patriots	Lindsay Cameron	2,197	2.19	+0.75
Total formal votes		100,115	94.66	+0.38
Informal votes		5,649	5.34	−0.38
Turnout		105,764	86.69	+1.91
Two-party-preferred result
Liberal	Rick Wilson	63,356	63.28	+6.59
Labor	Darren Moir	36,759	36.72	−6.59
Liberal hold		Swing	+6.59	
