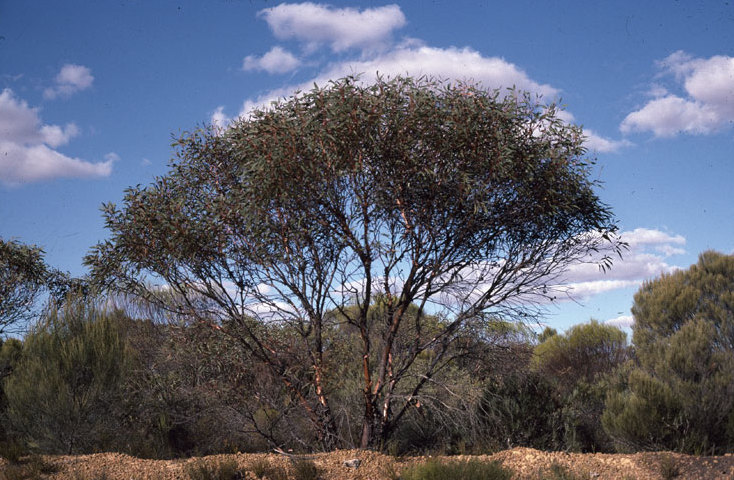

Conservation status
- Vulnerable (IUCN 3.1)

Scientific classification
- Kingdom: Plantae
- Clade: Tracheophytes
- Clade: Angiosperms
- Clade: Eudicots
- Clade: Rosids
- Order: Myrtales
- Family: Myrtaceae
- Genus: Eucalyptus
- Species: E. burracoppinensis

Binomial name
- Eucalyptus burracoppinensis Maiden & Blakely

= Eucalyptus burracoppinensis =

Burracoppin mallee

Species of eucalyptus

Eucalyptus burracoppinensis, commonly known as Burracoppin mallee is a mallee that is endemic to Western Australia. It has smooth bark, except for a short "stocking" of loose rough bark at the base, lance-shaped adult leaves, flower buds arranged in groups of three, white flowers and top-shaped fruit.

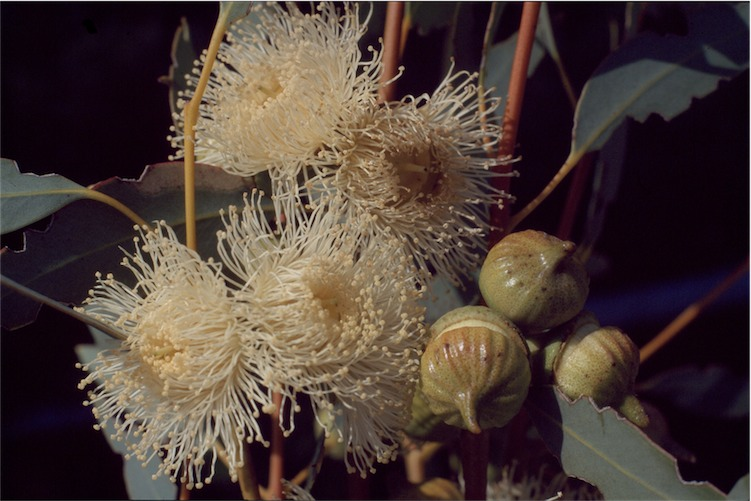
Buds and flowers

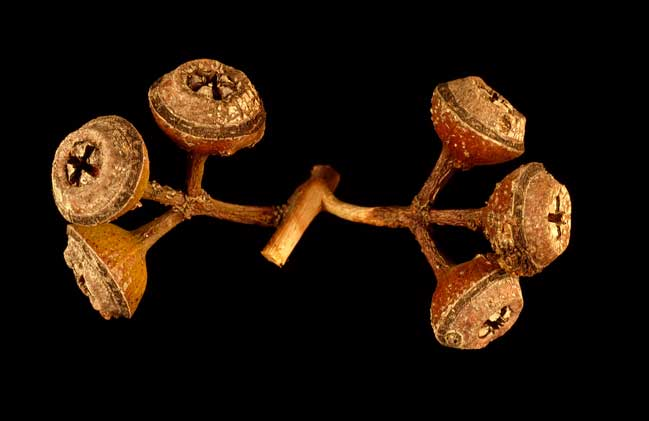
Fruit

== Description ==
Eucalyptus burracoppinensis is a mallee that typically grows to a height of 1 to 6 metres (3 to 20 ft) and forms a lignotuber. It has smooth grey and coppery to pink bark, except at the base of the trunk where there are persistent strips of rough, loose greyish bark. Young plants and coppice regrowth have leaves that are arranged alternately, dull green, egg-shaped to lance-shaped, 70–100 mm (2.8–3.9 in) long, 18–27 mm (0.7–1 in) wide and have a petiole. Adult leaves are lance-shaped, the same dull green on both sides, 60–115 mm (2.4–4.5 in) long and 9–23 mm (0.4–0.9 in) wide on a petiole 10–25 mm (0.39–0.98 in) long. The flower buds are arranged in groups of three on an unbranched peduncle 7–30 mm (0.28–1.2 in) long, the individual flowers on pedicels 3–10 mm (0.12–0.39 in) long. Mature flower buds are flattened globe-shaped, 16–30 mm (0.63–1.2 in) long and 13–20 mm (0.51–0.79 in) wide with a rounded operculum 11–23 mm (0.43–0.91 in) long that has a long, pointed and beaked tip. Flowering mainly occurs between August and November and the flowers are white. The fruit is a woody top-shaped capsule 12–20 mm (0.47–0.79 in) long and 15–25 mm (0.59–0.98 in) wide.

== Taxonomy and naming ==
Eucalyptus burracoppensis was first formally described in 1925 by Joseph Maiden and William Blakely and the description was published in Journal and Proceedings of the Royal Society of New South Wales. The specific epithet (burracopinensis) refers to Burracoppin, the ending -ensis is a Latin suffix "denoting place", "locality" or "country".

== Distribution and habitat ==
Burracoppin mallee is found on sandplains in scattered areas of the central and eastern wheatbelt region between Ballidu, Bullfinch, Kondinin and Marvel Loch.

== Conservation status ==
This eucalypt is classified as "not threatened" by the Western Australian Government Department of Parks and Wildlife.

== Use in horticulture ==
This eucalypt is a slow growing, drought tolerant mallee sold as an ornamental, hedge, shelterbelt and windbreak that can grow in low rainfall areas.

== See also ==
- List of Eucalyptus species
