= Youndegin =

Town in Wheatbelt, Western Australia

- Town
- Coordinates: 31°47′S 117°20′E
- Country: Australia
- State: Western Australia
- LGA: Shire of Cunderdin
- Location: 155 km (96 mi) east of Perth; 18 km (11 mi) south of Northam
- Established: 1892

Government
  - State electorate: Central Wheatbelt
  - Federal division: Durack
- Elevation: 296 m (971 ft)
- Postcode: 6407

Youndegin is a small town 155 kilometres (96 mi) east of Perth, Western Australia along the Goldfields Road in the Wheatbelt region of Western Australia.

A police post existed in Youndegin in 1844; the same year several metallic objects later identified as meteorites were found not far from town during a routine police patrol.

The townsite of Youndegin was gazetted in 1892.

Charles Cooke Hunt was the first European to visit the area in 1864 when he established a track through the area to the eastern pastoral regions. By 1876 the government has set aside land for a police station. When gold was discovered further to the east in the 1880s, the traffic along the track increased immensely, and by 1891 an inn had been constructed, named the Youndegin Arms. Following the gazetting of the town and the subdivision of lots, a railway to the goldfields was constructed well south of the town, and little further development occurred.

The name of the town is Aboriginal in origin and is the name of a nearby hill; the name was first recorded by Hunt during his 1864 expedition.
