= Wongamine =

- Town
- Interactive map of Wongamine
- Coordinates: 31°29′S 116°37′E
- Country: Australia
- State: Western Australia
- LGA: Shire of Goomalling

Area
  - Total: 27.8 km^{2} (10.7 sq mi)

Population
  - Total: 39 (SAL 2016)
- Postcode: 6401

Wongamine is a locality in the Wheatbelt region of Western Australia.

Located approximately 30 kilometres (19 mi) from the nearby town of Goomalling and 19 kilometres (12 mi) from Toodyay along Toodyay Road. The locality is situated entirely within the boundaries of the Shire of Goomalling.

== Education ==
The locality had a primary school from 1876 until it shut down in 1945. William Perrin taught at Buckland Primary School from 1871 to 1876 then Wongamine Primary School to 1900. He was one of many ex-convict teachers.

== Notable people ==
Notable people from or who have lived in Wongamine include:

- William Perrin, ticket of leave settler, and teacher
- Charles Dempster, politician, Western Australian Legislative Council
