= Acacia filifolia =

Conservation status
- Priority Three — Poorly Known Taxa (DEC)

Scientific classification
- Kingdom: Plantae
- Clade: Tracheophytes
- Clade: Angiosperms
- Clade: Eudicots
- Clade: Rosids
- Order: Fabales
- Family: Fabaceae
- Subfamily: Caesalpinioideae
- Clade: Mimosoid clade
- Genus: Acacia
- Species: A. filifolia

Binomial name
- Acacia filifolia Benth.
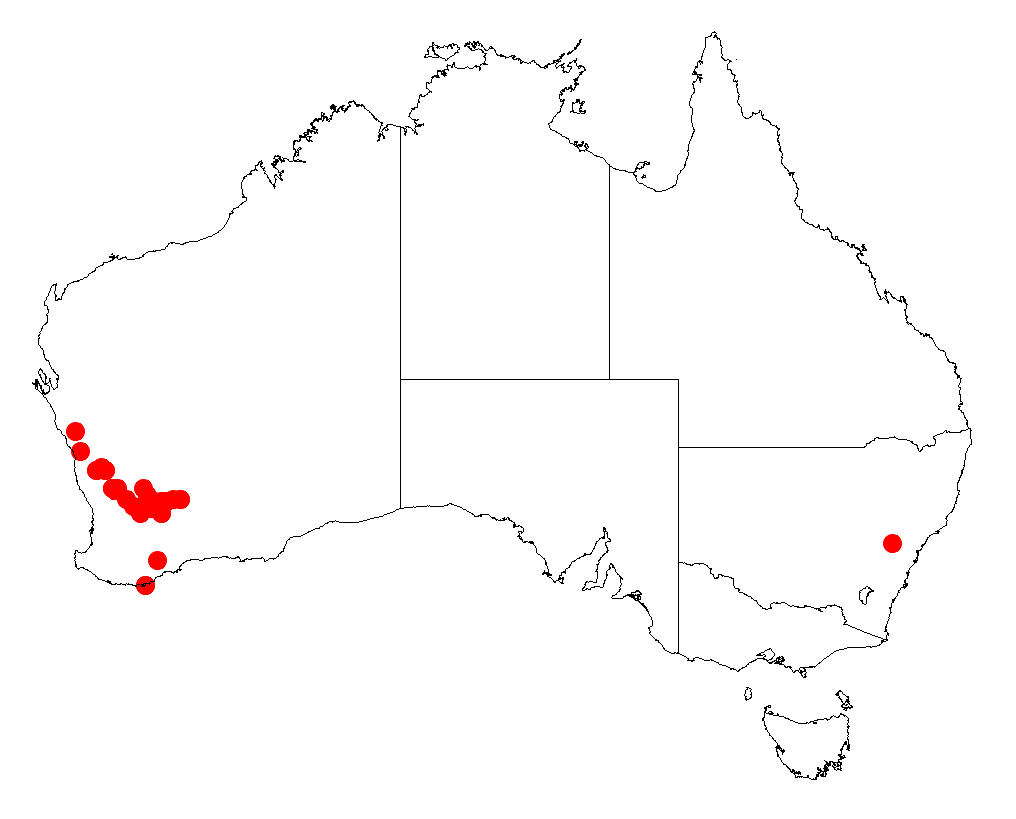
- Occurrence data from AVH

Synonyms
- Racosperma filifolium (Benth.) Pedley; Acacia ephedroides auct. non Benth.: Bentham, G. (5 October 1864), p.p.

Species of legume

Acacia filifolia is a species of flowering plant in the family Fabaceae and is endemic to the south-west of Western Australia. It is a wispy, spindly, single-stemmed shrub or tree with straight to winding branchlets, sessile, ascending phyllodes, more or less spherical to oblong heads of yellow flowers and linear, firmly papery pods.

== Description ==
Acacia filifolia is an open, wispy, spindly shrub or tree that typically grows to a height of 1.2–3 m (3 ft 11 in – 9 ft 10 in) and is single stemmed or sparingly branched at the base. Its branches are straight to slightly winding with silky hairs between resin-ribs. The phyllodes are sessile, ascending, curved and four-sided in cross section, sometimes terete, 120–200 mm (4.7–7.9 in) long, 0.7–1 mm (0.028–0.039 in) wide, yellow green and glabrous. There are eight, broad, flat-topped veins, each separated by a shallow, dark coloured furrow on the phyllodes. The flowers are golden yellow and borne one or two sessile, more or less spherical to oblong heads 6–12 mm (0.24–0.47 in) long and 5–8 mm (0.20–0.31 in) wide in axils. Flowering occurs from May to September and the pods are linear, firmly papery, up to 120 mm (4.7 in) long, 2.5–3.0 mm (0.098–0.118 in) wide and densely hairy with yellowish edges. The seeds are oblong to elliptic, 3 mm (0.12 in) long and glossy, mottled grey-brown and brown with an aril more or less the same length as the seed.

== Taxonomy ==
Acacia filifolia was first formally described in 1842 by the botanist George Bentham in William Jackson Hooker's London Journal of Botany from specimens collected in the Swan River Colony by James Drummond. The specific epithet (filifolia) means 'thread-leaved'.

== Distribution and habitat ==
This species of wattle grows in sand over laterite, mostly in shrubland in scattered populations from near Coorow and east through Wongan Hills to near Burracoppin and Southern Cross in the Avon Wheatbelt, Coolgardie and Geraldton Sandplains bioregions of south-western Western Australia.

== Conservation status ==
Acacia filifolia is listed as "Priority Three" by the Government of Western Australia Department of Biodiversity, Conservation and Attractions meaning that it is poorly known and known from only a few locations but is not under imminent threat.

== See also ==
- List of Acacia species
