= Westonia =

Westonia may refer to:

- Elizabeth Jane Weston (1582-1612), English-Czech poet known as Westonia
- Westonia, Western Australia, a town
- Shire of Westonia, Western Australia
- Westonia (brachiopod); see List of brachiopod genera
