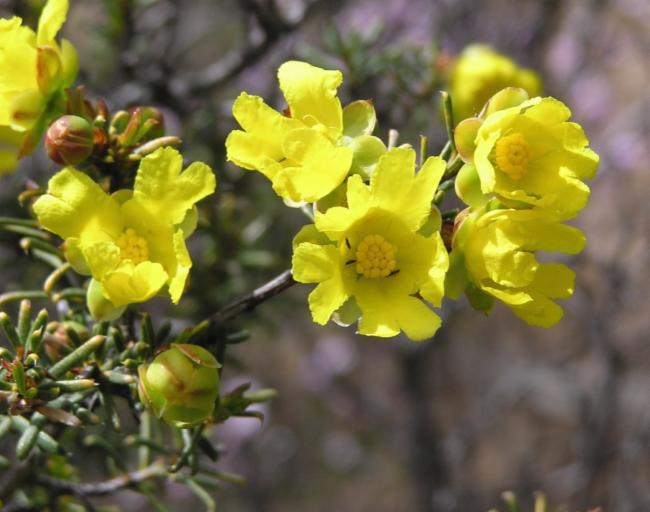
- Near Burracoppin

Scientific classification
- Kingdom: Plantae
- Clade: Tracheophytes
- Clade: Angiosperms
- Clade: Eudicots
- Order: Dilleniales
- Family: Dilleniaceae
- Genus: Hibbertia
- Species: H. pungens

Binomial name
- Hibbertia pungens Steud.

= Hibbertia pungens =

Species of flowering plant

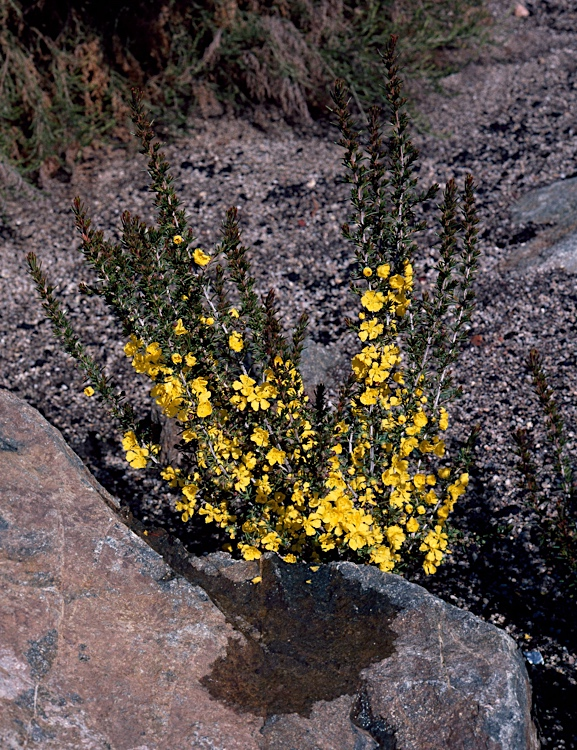
Habit in the ANBG

Hibbertia pungens is a species of flowering plant in the family Dilleniaceae and is endemic to Western Australia. It is a prickly, erect or sprawling shrub that typically grows to a height of 0.2–2.0 m (7.9 in – 6 ft 6.7 in) and produces uniformly yellow flowers between June and November. It was first formally described in 1863 by George Bentham in Flora Australiensis. The specific epithet (pungens) means "ending in a sharp point".

This species is found in the Avon Wheatbelt, Coolgardie, Esperance Plains, Geraldton Sandplains, Great Victoria Desert, Hampton, Mallee, Murchison and Yalgoo biogeographic regions of Western Australia where it grows on rocky hillsides, plains and river banks.

== See also ==
- List of Hibbertia species
