= Pioneer Women's Memorial Waterfall =

The Pioneer Women's Memorial Waterfall is a commemorative waterfall in the town of Merredin, Western Australia. It honours the contribution of women settlers to the development of the district.

The waterfall was built by the Merredin Museum and Historical Society and unveiled in November 1993 by Transport Minister Eric Charlton. At the opening, Charlton commented that the first white women to arrive in the area initially lacked experience in the harsh living conditions, but their "deep resourcefulness and strong character" enabled them to manage difficult times well.
