= Shire of Merredin =

Local government area in the Wheatbelt region of Western Australia

Coordinates: 31°28′59″S 118°17′10″E

- Local government area
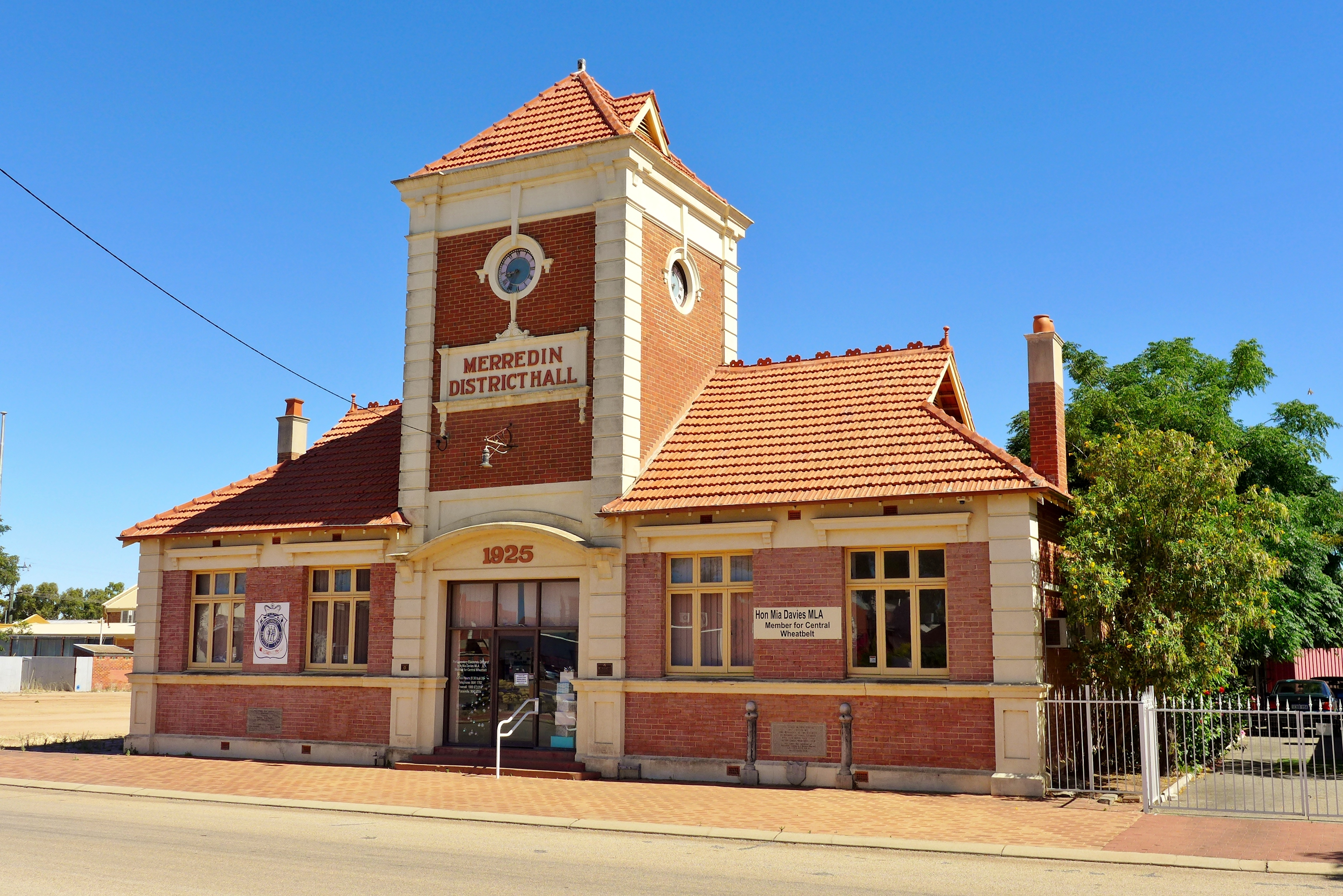
- The state heritage listed Merredin District Hall, 2014

- Interactive map of Shire of Merredin
- Country: Australia
- State: Western Australia
- Region: Wheatbelt
- Council seat: Merredin

Government
  - Shire President: Donna Crook
  - State electorate: Central Wheatbelt
  - Federal division: O'Connor

Area
  - Total: 3,299.7 km^{2} (1,274.0 sq mi)

Population
  - Total: 3,119 (LGA 2021)
- Website: Shire of Merredin
LGAs around Shire of Merredin
| Nungarin | Mukinbudin | Westonia |
| Kellerberrin | Shire of Merredin | Westonia |
| Bruce Rock | Narembeen | Yilgarn |

The Shire of Merredin is a local government area in the Wheatbelt region of Western Australia, about 250 kilometres (155 mi) east of Perth, the state capital. Its seat of government is the town of Merredin, where 2,804 of the Shire's 3,595 residents live. The Shire covers an area of 3,300 square kilometres (1,274 sq mi).

== History ==
On 30 June 1921, the Merredin Road District was created. On 1 July 1961, it became a shire under the Local Government Act 1960.

== Wards ==
On 3 May 2003, all wards were abolished and all 11 councillors sit at large.

Prior to this, the ward structure was as follows:

- Central Ward (7 councillors)
- North West Ward
- North East Ward
- South West Ward
- Totadgin Ward

== Towns and localities ==
The towns and localities of the Shire of Merredin with population and size figures based on the most recent Australian census:

| Locality | Population | Area | Map |
|---|---|---|---|
| Burracoppin | 114 (SAL 2021) | 312.7 km^{2} (120.7 sq mi) | |
| Goomarin | 15 (SAL 2021) | 277.9 km^{2} (107.3 sq mi) | |
| Hines Hill | 59 (SAL 2021) | 237.8 km^{2} (91.8 sq mi) | |
| Korbel | 59 (SAL 2021) | 341.2 km^{2} (131.7 sq mi) | |
| Merredin | 2,604 (SAL 2021) | 250.1 km^{2} (96.6 sq mi) | |
| Muntadgin | 39 (SAL 2021) | 262.2 km^{2} (101.2 sq mi) | |
| Nangeenan | 75 (SAL 2021) | 184.6 km^{2} (71.3 sq mi) | |
| Nokaning | 48 (SAL 2021) | 233.6 km^{2} (90.2 sq mi) | |
| Norpa | 29 (SAL 2021) | 209.3 km^{2} (80.8 sq mi) | |
| Nukarni | 39 (SAL 2021) | 242 km^{2} (93 sq mi) | |
| South Burracoppin | 30 (SAL 2016) | 366.2 km^{2} (141.4 sq mi) | |
| Tandegin | 16 (SAL 2021) | 376.4 km^{2} (145.3 sq mi) | |

== Population ==
Historical population

| Year | Pop. | ±% p.a. |
|---|---|---|
| 1921 | 2,799 | — |
| 1933 | 3,445 | +1.75% |
| 1947 | 3,023 | −0.93% |
| 1954 | 3,797 | +3.31% |
| 1961 | 4,563 | +2.66% |
| 1966 | 5,297 | +3.03% |
| 1971 | 4,693 | −2.39% |
| 1976 | 4,730 | +0.16% |
| 1981 | 4,525 | −0.88% |

| Year | Pop. | ±% p.a. |
|---|---|---|
| 1986 | 4,177 | −1.59% |
| 1991 | 3,802 | −1.86% |
| 1996 | 3,634 | −0.90% |
| 2001 | 3,595 | −0.22% |
| 2006 | 3,245 | −2.03% |
| 2011 | 3,282 | +0.23% |
| 2016 | 3,350 | +0.41% |
| 2021 | 3,119 | −1.42% |

== Notable councillors ==
- William Telfer, Merredin Roads Board member 1936–1955, chairman 1938–1955; also a state MP

== Heritage-listed places ==
As of 2024, 99 places are heritage-listed in the Shire of Merredin, of which 15 are on the State Register of Heritage Places.
