= Shire of Mukinbudin =

Local government area in the Wheatbelt region in Western Australia

Coordinates: 30°54′50″S 118°12′25″E

- Local government area
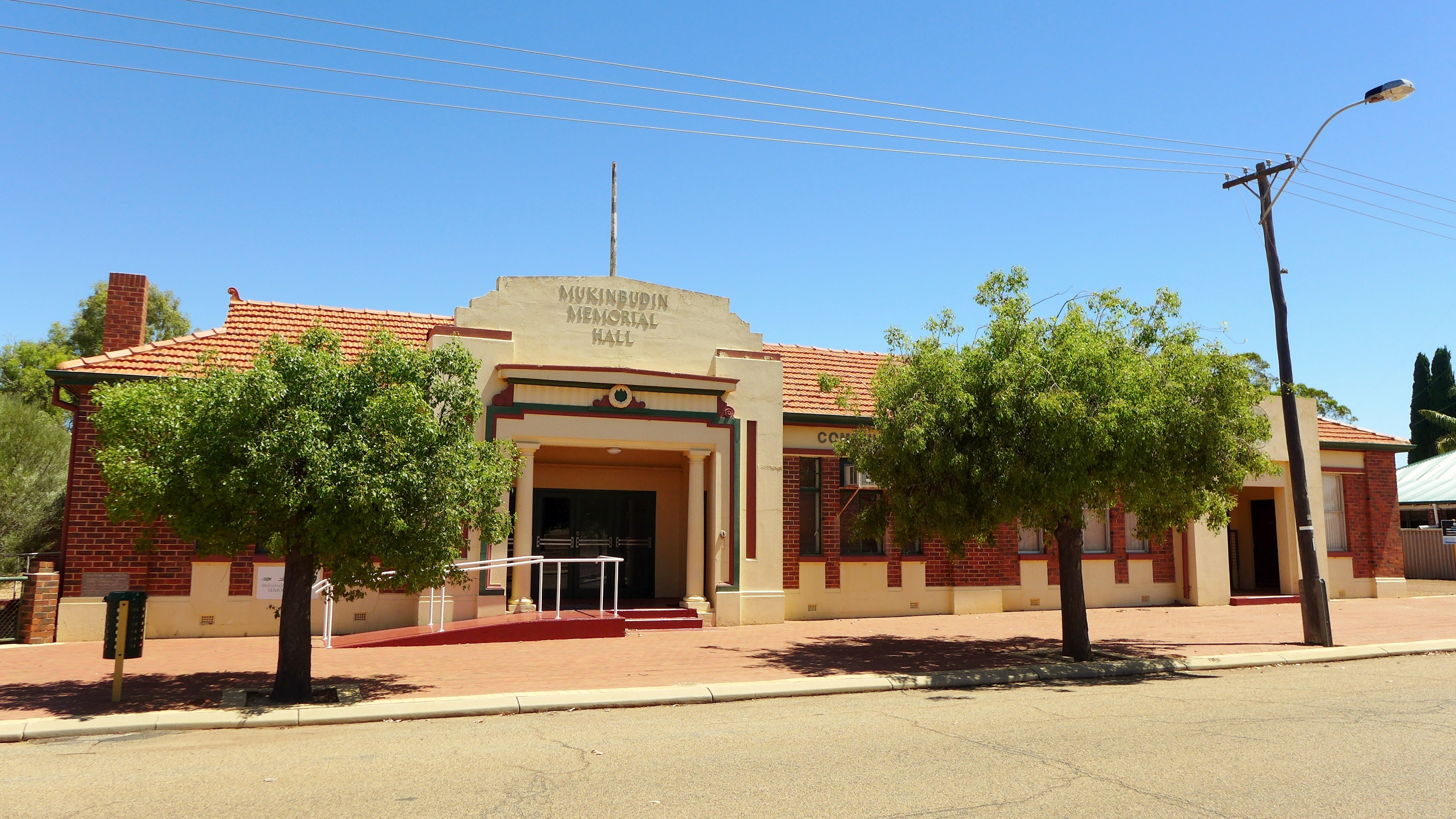
- Mukinbudin Memorial Hall, 2014

- Interactive map of Shire of Mukinbudin
- Country: Australia
- State: Western Australia
- Region: Wheatbelt
- Council seat: Mukinbudin

Government
  - Shire President: Gary Shadbolt
  - State electorate: Central Wheatbelt
  - Federal division: Durack

Area
  - Total: 3,437.1 km^{2} (1,327.1 sq mi)

Population
  - Total: 579 (LGA 2021)
- Postcode: 6479
- Website: Shire of Mukinbudin
LGAs around Shire of Mukinbudin
Mount Marshall	Mount Marshall	Yilgarn
Mount Marshall	Shire of Mukinbudin	Westonia
Trayning	Nungarin	Merredin

The Shire of Mukinbudin is a local government area in the Wheatbelt region of Western Australia, about 80 kilometres (50 mi) north of Merredin and about 300 kilometres (186 mi) east of the state capital, Perth. The Shire covers an area of 3,437 square kilometres (1,327 sq mi), and its seat of government is the town of Mukinbudin.

== History ==
Initially, Mukinbudin was governed by the Merredin Road District, and then from 1921 the Nungarin Road District.

The Shire of Mukinbudin originated as the Mukinbudin Road District, established with effect from 1 November 1933, having separated from Nungarin due to a growing population. Its first election was held on 18 November 1933, and Thomas Basil Conway was elected its inaugural chairman at its first meeting.

On 1 July 1961, it became a Shire following the passage of the Local Government Act 1960, which reformed all remaining road districts into shires.

== Towns and localities ==
The towns and localities of the Shire of Mukinbudin with population and size figures based on the most recent Australian census:

Locality	Population	Area	Map
Barbalin	17 (SAL 2021)	165.3 km^{2} (63.8 sq mi)	
Bonnie Rock	60 (SAL 2021)	1,246.8 km^{2} (481.4 sq mi)	
Dandanning	26 (SAL 2021)	206.2 km^{2} (79.6 sq mi)	
Karloning	34 (SAL 2021)	213.3 km^{2} (82.4 sq mi)	
Lake Brown	13 (SAL 2016)	258.3 km^{2} (99.7 sq mi)	
Mukinbudin	336 (SAL 2021)	227.7 km^{2} (87.9 sq mi)	
North Wialki	10 (SAL 2021)	290.6 km^{2} (112.2 sq mi)	
Wattoning	24 (SAL 2021)	195.7 km^{2} (75.6 sq mi)	
Wialki *	45 (SAL 2021)	889.1 km^{2} (343.3 sq mi)	
Wilgoyne	38 (SAL 2016)	461.7 km^{2} (178.3 sq mi)	

- (* indicates locality is only partially located within this shire)

== Population ==
Historical population

Year	Pop.	±% p.a.
1933	350	—
1947	470	+2.13%
1954	589	+3.28%
1961	707	+2.64%
1966	869	+4.21%
1971	872	+0.07%
1976	995	+2.67%
1981	884	−2.34%

Year	Pop.	±% p.a.
1986	855	−0.66%
1991	678	−4.53%
1996	691	+0.38%
2001	648	−1.28%
2006	575	−2.36%
2011	490	−3.15%
2016	555	+2.52%
2021	579	+0.85%

== Heritage-listed places ==
As of 2023, 37 places are heritage-listed in the Shire of Mukinbudin, of which none are on the State Register of Heritage Places.
