= Shire of Kellerberrin =

Local government area in the Wheatbelt region of Western Australia

Coordinates: 31°37′55″S 117°42′29″E

- Local government area
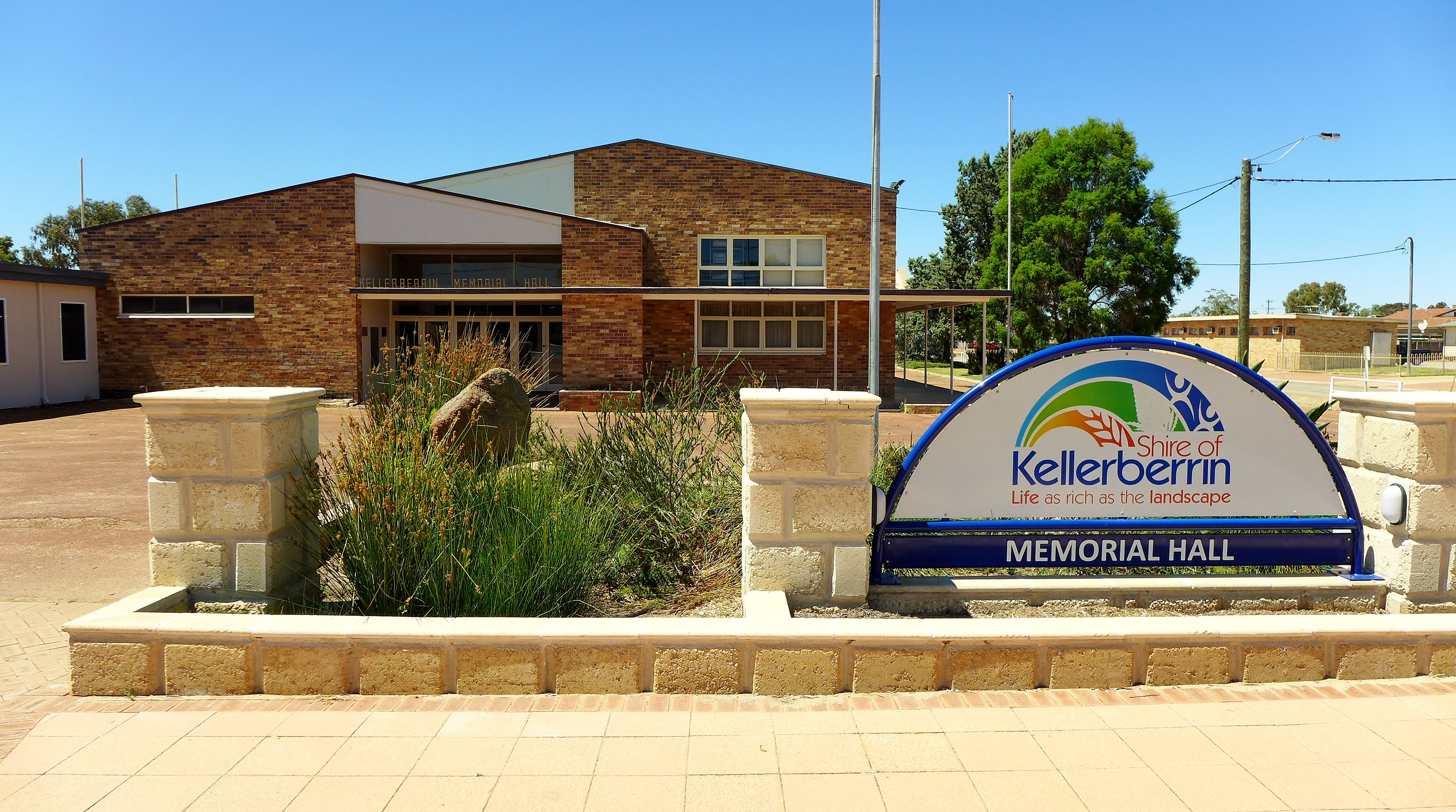
- Kellerberrin Memorial Hall, 2014

- Interactive map of Shire of Kellerberrin
- Country: Australia
- State: Western Australia
- Region: Wheatbelt
- Established: 1908
- Council seat: Kellerberrin

Government
  - Shire President: Scott O’Neill
  - State electorate: Central Wheatbelt
  - Federal division: Durack

Area
  - Total: 1,916.8 km^{2} (740.1 sq mi)

Population
  - Total: 1,138 (LGA 2021)
- Website: Shire of Kellerberrin
LGAs around Shire of Kellerberrin
Wyalkatchem	Trayning	Nungarin
Tammin	Shire of Kellerberrin	Merredin
Quairading	Bruce Rock	Bruce Rock

The Shire of Kellerberrin is a local government area in the Wheatbelt region of Western Australia, about 60 kilometres (37 mi) west of Merredin and about 200 kilometres (124 mi) east of Perth, the state capital. The Shire covers an area of 1,917 square kilometres (740 sq mi) and its seat of government is the town of Kellerberrin.

== History ==
On 24 July 1908, the Kellerberrin Road District was created, and included large parts of what is now Tammin, Wyalkatchem and Trayning. On 1 July 1961, it became the Shire of Kellerberrin after the Local Government Act 1960 was enacted, which reformed all remaining road districts into shires.

== Wards ==
The Shire has seven councillors and no wards. Prior to the elections in May 2003, there were eight councillors representing three wards - East Ward (2), Kellerberrin Ward (4) and West Ward (2).

== Towns and localities ==
The towns and localities of the Shire of Kellerberrin with population and size figures based on the most recent Australian census:

Locality	Population	Area	Map
Baandee	12 (SAL 2021)	146.3 km^{2} (56.5 sq mi)	
Daadenning Creek	32 (SAL 2021)	288.1 km^{2} (111.2 sq mi)	
Doodlakine	81 (SAL 2021)	246.8 km^{2} (95.3 sq mi)	
Kellerberrin	877 (SAL 2021)	305 km^{2} (118 sq mi)	
Mount Caroline	12 (SAL 2021)	93.2 km^{2} (36.0 sq mi)	
North Baandee	49 (SAL 2021)	298.6 km^{2} (115.3 sq mi)	
North Kellerberrin	30 (SAL 2021)	297.1 km^{2} (114.7 sq mi)	
South Doodlakine	47 (SAL 2016)	240.8 km^{2} (93.0 sq mi)	

== Population ==
Historical population

Year	Pop.	±% p.a.
1921	1,804	—
1933	2,412	+2.45%
1947	2,076	−1.07%
1954	2,347	+1.77%
1961	2,420	+0.44%
1966	2,367	−0.44%
1971	2,132	−2.07%
1976	1,794	−3.39%
1981	1,663	−1.51%

Year	Pop.	±% p.a.
1986	1,436	−2.89%
1991	1,326	−1.58%
1996	1,210	−1.81%
2001	1,162	−0.81%
2006	1,183	+0.36%
2011	1,181	−0.03%
2016	1,224	+0.72%
2021	1,138	−1.45%

== Notable councillors ==
- Tom Harrison, Kellerberrin Roads Board member 1911–1915, briefly chairman; later a state MP
- Leslie Diver, Kellerberrin Roads Board member 1933–1946, chairman 1940, 1942–1946; later a state MP

== Heritage-listed places ==
As of 2023, 57 places are heritage-listed in the Shire of Kellerberrin, of which six are on the State Register of Heritage Places.
