= Shire of Wiluna =

Local government area in the Goldfields-Esperance region of Western Australia

Coordinates: 26°35′42″S 120°13′30″E

- Local government area
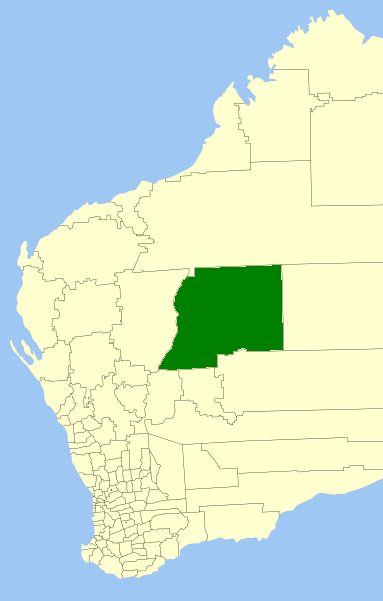
- Location in Western Australia

- Interactive map of Shire of Wiluna
- Country: Australia
- State: Western Australia
- Region: Goldfields-Esperance
- Council seat: Wiluna

Government
  - Shire President: Mr Peter Grundy
  - State electorate: Kalgoorlie, Kimberley
  - Federal division: O'Connor

Area
  - Total: 182,155.8 km^{2} (70,330.7 sq mi)

Population
  - Total: 535 (LGA 2021)
- Website: Shire of Wiluna
LGAs around Shire of Wiluna
| East Pilbara | East Pilbara | East Pilbara |
| Meekatharra | Shire of Wiluna | Ngaanyatjarraku |
| Sandstone | Leonora | Laverton |

The Shire of Wiluna is a local government area in the Goldfields-Esperance region (since 2021) of Western Australia, about 950 kilometres (590 mi) northeast of the state capital, Perth. The Shire covers an area of 182,155 square kilometres (70,330 sq mi), and its seat of government is the town of Wiluna.

== History ==
The Wiluna Road District was gazetted on 29 October 1909, largely formed out of part of the abolished Nannine Road District. On 1 July 1961, it became a shire following the passage of the Local Government Act 1960, which reformed all road districts into shires. On 1 July 1993, the eastern half of the Shire abutting the State's border with the Northern Territory was incorporated as the Shire of Ngaanyatjarraku.

The shire is predominantly mining and pastoral land. There are 27 pastoral leases within the shire; 15 of which are owned by families or pastoral companies, ten of which are owned by mining companies, two are owned by the Department of Environment and Conservation (DEC). Both of the stations that are owned by the DEC are destocked and run as nature reserves; many of the leases owned by mining companies have also been destocked.

== Wards ==
The Shire is no longer divided into wards and the seven councillors sit at large.

== Towns and localities ==
The towns and localities of the Shire of Wiluna with population and size figures based on the most recent Australian census:

| Locality | Population | Area | Map |
|---|---|---|---|
| Lake Carnegie | 12 (SAL 2021) | 25,855.6 km^{2} (9,982.9 sq mi) | |
| Little Sandy Desert | 5 (SAL 2021) | 119,397.1 km^{2} (46,099.5 sq mi) | |
| Wiluna | 521 (SAL 2021) | 35,984.5 km^{2} (13,893.7 sq mi) | |

== Heritage-listed places ==
As of 2023, 38 places are heritage-listed in the Shire of Wiluna, of which two are on the State Register of Heritage Places.
