= Shire of Cunderdin =

Local government area in the Wheatbelt region in Western Australia

Coordinates: 31°39′22″S 117°14′38″E

- Local government area
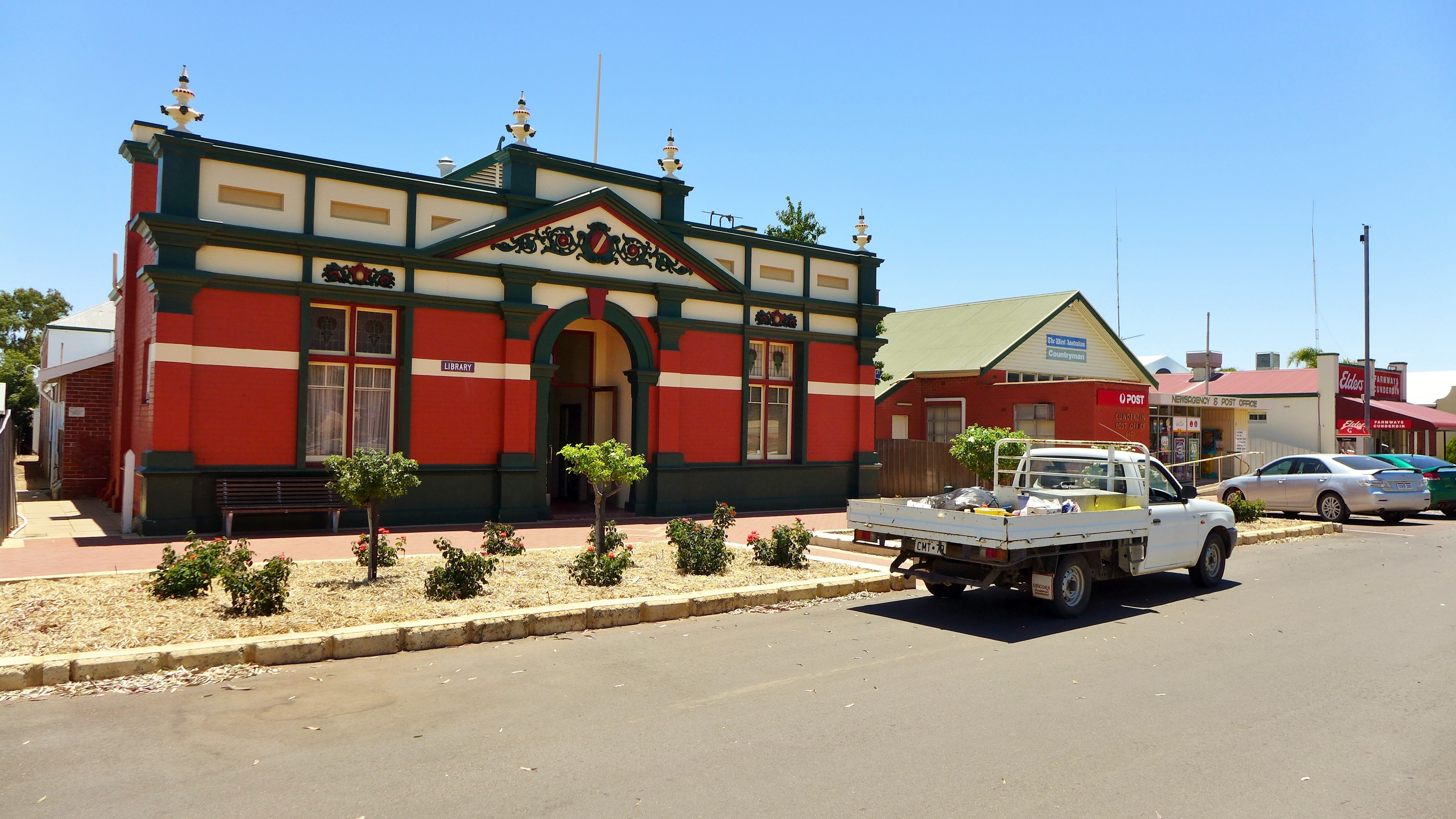
- The state heritage listed Cunderdin Hall, 2015

- Interactive map of Shire of Cunderdin
- Country: Australia
- State: Western Australia
- Region: Wheatbelt
- Council seat: Cunderdin

Government
  - Shire President: Alison Harris
  - State electorates: Central Wheatbelt; Agricultural
  - Federal division: Durack

Area
  - Total: 1,864.2 km^{2} (719.8 sq mi)

Population
  - Total: 1,302 (LGA 2021)
- Postcode: 6407
- Gazetted: 1906 (Cunderdin townsite)
- Website: Shire of Cunderdin
LGAs around Shire of Cunderdin
Goomalling	Dowerin	Wyalkatchem
Northam	Shire of Cunderdin	Tammin
York	Quairading	Quairading

The Shire of Cunderdin is a local government area in the Wheatbelt region of Western Australia, about 105 kilometres (65 mi) west of Merredin and about 155 kilometres (96 mi) east of Perth, the state capital. The Shire covers an area of 1,864 square kilometres (720 sq mi), and its seat of government is the town of Cunderdin.

== History ==
On 14 December 1894, the Meckering Road District was created, changing its name to the Cunderdin Road District on 3 November 1944. On 1 July 1961, it became a Shire following the passage of the Local Government Act 1960, which reformed all remaining road districts into shires.

== Wards ==
All wards in the shire were abolished before the 3 May 2003 election. Prior to this, it had 8 councillors representing two wards - West Ward (3 councillors) and Central Ward (5 councillors).

== Towns and localities ==
The towns and localities of the Shire of Cunderdin with population and size figures based on the most recent Australian census:

Locality	Population	Area	Map
Cunderdin	824 (SAL 2021)	331.8 km^{2} (128.1 sq mi)	
Greenwoods Valley	23 (SAL 2021)	123.1 km^{2} (47.5 sq mi)	
Meckering	232 (SAL 2021)	216 km^{2} (83 sq mi)	
Quelagetting	32 (SAL 2021)	198.2 km^{2} (76.5 sq mi)	
Waeel	51 (SAL 2021)	251 km^{2} (97 sq mi)	
Warding East	55 (SAL 2021)	212.5 km^{2} (82.0 sq mi)	
Watercarrin	28 (SAL 2021)	207.4 km^{2} (80.1 sq mi)	
Wyola West	18 (SAL 2021)	166.7 km^{2} (64.4 sq mi)	
Youndegin	33 (SAL 2021)	155.2 km^{2} (59.9 sq mi)	

== Cunderdin Museum ==
The Shire owned Cunderdin Museum is situated in the former No 3 Steam Pumping Station in Forrest Street with its tall chimney visible for miles. It has the largest local collection of memorabilia, information and photographs of the history of the Cunderdin-Meckering area, including one of the best displays of farm equipment, original steam driven water pumping machinery, railway carriages, and even includes a Tiger Moth.

The interactive Earthquake House, gives visitors a real appreciation of what the 1968 Meckering earthquake felt like.

The Museum is open 10am to 4pm daily (except Christmas Day and Good Friday).

The Museum is also the home of the Cunderdin Men's Shed.

== Population ==
Historical population

Year	Pop.	±% p.a.
1911	2,115	—
1921	2,183	+0.32%
1933	2,745	+1.93%
1947	2,445	−0.82%
1954	2,130	−1.95%
1961	2,014	−0.80%
1966	2,114	+0.97%
1971	1,862	−2.51%
1976	1,586	−3.16%

Year	Pop.	±% p.a.
1981	1,630	+0.55%
1986	1,484	−1.86%
1991	1,389	−1.31%
1996	1,368	−0.30%
2001	1,374	+0.09%
2006	1,250	−1.87%
2011	1,310	+0.94%
2016	1,457	+2.15%
2021	1,302	−2.22%

== Heritage-listed places ==
As of 2023, 29 places are heritage-listed in the Shire of Cunderdin, of which five are on the State Register of Heritage Places.
