= Division of Durack =

Australian federal electoral division

Coordinates: 22.777°S 121.428°E

Durack Australian House of Representatives Division
- Interactive map of electorate boundaries from the 2025 federal election
- Created: 2010
- MP: Melissa Price
- Party: Liberal
- Namesake: Durack family of Western Australia
- Electors: 118,558 (2022)
- Area: 1,410,947 km^{2} (544,769.7 sq mi)
- Demographic: Rural
Electorates around Durack:
Indian Ocean	Indian Ocean	Lingiari (NT)
Indian Ocean	Durack	Lingiari (NT)
Pearce; Hasluck; Bullwinkel	O'Connor	O'Connor

The Division of Durack (/ˈdjuːræk/) is an Australian electoral division in the state of Western Australia. It is the largest electorate in Australia by land area, at 1,410,947 km^{2} (544,769.7 sq mi). It stretches all the way along the coast from Guilderton to the Northern Territory border.

Since 2013, its MP has been Melissa Price of the Liberal Party.

== History ==
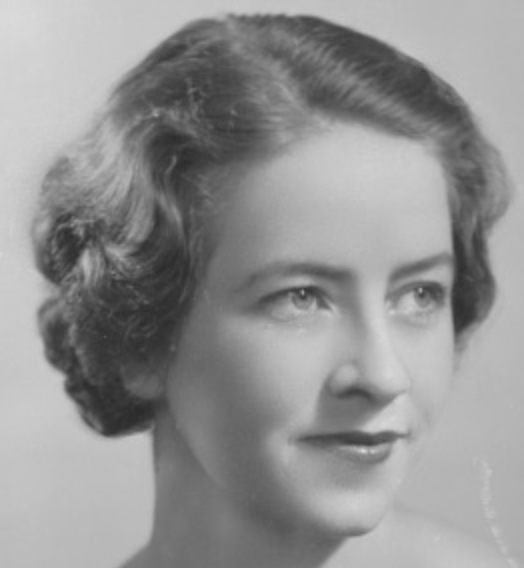
Dame Mary Durack, whose family is the division's namesake

The Division is named after the pioneering Durack family, whose lives are recounted in Dame Mary Durack's books of history.

Created to replace parts of the divisions of Kalgoorlie (which was abolished) and O'Connor, it elected its first member at the 2010 election. It was created as a comfortably safe Liberal seat. Sitting Kalgoorlie MP Barry Haase contested the seat for the Liberals and won. Haase announced he would not recontest Durack at the next election on 15 June 2013. The seat was won at the 2013 election by Liberal candidate Melissa Price. She held the seat without serious difficulty until the 2022 election, when she suffered a swing of over 10 percent to make the seat marginal for the first time.

== Geography ==
Since 1984, federal electoral division boundaries in Australia have been determined at redistributions by a redistribution committee appointed by the Australian Electoral Commission (AEC). Redistributions occur for the boundaries of divisions in a particular state, and they occur every seven years, or sooner if a state's representation entitlement changes or when divisions of a state are malapportioned.

In August 2021, the AEC announced that Durack's Wheatbelt Shires of Bruce Rock, Cunderdin, Kellerberrin, Koorda, Kulin, Merredin, Mount Marshall, Mukinbudin, Narembeen, Nungarin, Quairading, Tammin, Trayning, Westonia, Wyalkatchem and Yilgarn and Durack's Mid West Shire of Wiluna would be transferred to the seat of O'Connor, while the Wheatbelt Shires of Chittering, Gingin, Northam, Toodyay and York would be transferred to Durack from the seat of Pearce. These boundary changes took effect with the next federal election.

Durack presently includes the Kimberley region (Broome, Derby-West Kimberley, Halls Creek, and Wyndham-East Kimberley), the Pilbara region (Ashburton, East Pilbara, Karratha, and Port Hedland), the Gascoyne region (Carnarvon, Exmouth, Shark Bay and Upper Gascoyne), most of the Mid West region (Carnamah, Chapman Valley, Coorow, Cue, Geraldton, Irwin, Meekatharra, Mingenew, Morawa, Mount Magnet, Murchison, Northampton, Perenjori, Sandstone, Three Springs, and Yalgoo), and northern and central parts of the Wheatbelt (Chittering, Dandaragan, Dowerin, Gingin, Goomalling, Moora, Northam, Toodyay, Victoria Plains, Wongan-Ballidu, and York). A small portion of Perth's metropolitan area also falls in the electorate with the town of Bullsbrook, part of the City of Swan, marking part of the southern boundary.

At 1,410,947 km^{2} (over 55 per cent of the landmass of Western Australia), Durack is the largest electorate in Australia by land area, the largest constituency in the world that practices compulsory voting, and the fourth largest single-member electorate in the world after Yakutsk in Russia, Nunavut in Canada, and Alaska in the United States. It is also larger than all Australian states and territories except for Western Australia itself and Queensland.

== Members ==
Image	Member	Party	Term	Notes
	Barry Haase (1945–)	Liberal	21 August 2010 – 5 August 2013	Previously held the Division of Kalgoorlie. Retired
	Melissa Price (1963–)	Liberal	7 September 2013 – present	Served as minister under Morrison. Incumbent

== Election results ==
2025 Australian federal election: Durack
Party	Candidate	Votes	%	±%
Liberal	Melissa Price	28,920	32.88	−2.52
Labor	Karen Wheatland	20,583	23.40	−5.36
National	Bailey Kempton	11,972	13.61	+4.17
One Nation	Mark Berry	8,868	10.08	+3.04
Greens	Brendan Sturcke	7,196	8.18	−1.32
Legalise Cannabis	Kat Wright	5,239	5.96	+5.96
Christians	Eugenie Harris	1,880	2.14	+2.01
Indigenous-Aboriginal	Jason Hunter	1,872	2.13	+2.13
Trumpet of Patriots	Maarten Kornaat	1,432	1.63	+0.12
Total formal votes		87,962	93.65	+0.16
Informal votes		5,966	6.35	−0.16
Turnout		93,928	78.31	+1.88
Two-party-preferred result
Liberal	Melissa Price	52,912	60.15	+5.49
Labor	Karen Wheatland	35,050	39.85	−5.49
Liberal hold		Swing	+5.49	

== See also ==
- Electoral district of North West Central for the Western Australian Legislative Assembly, the largest electoral division by area in Western Australia
