= Shire of Goomalling =

- Local government area
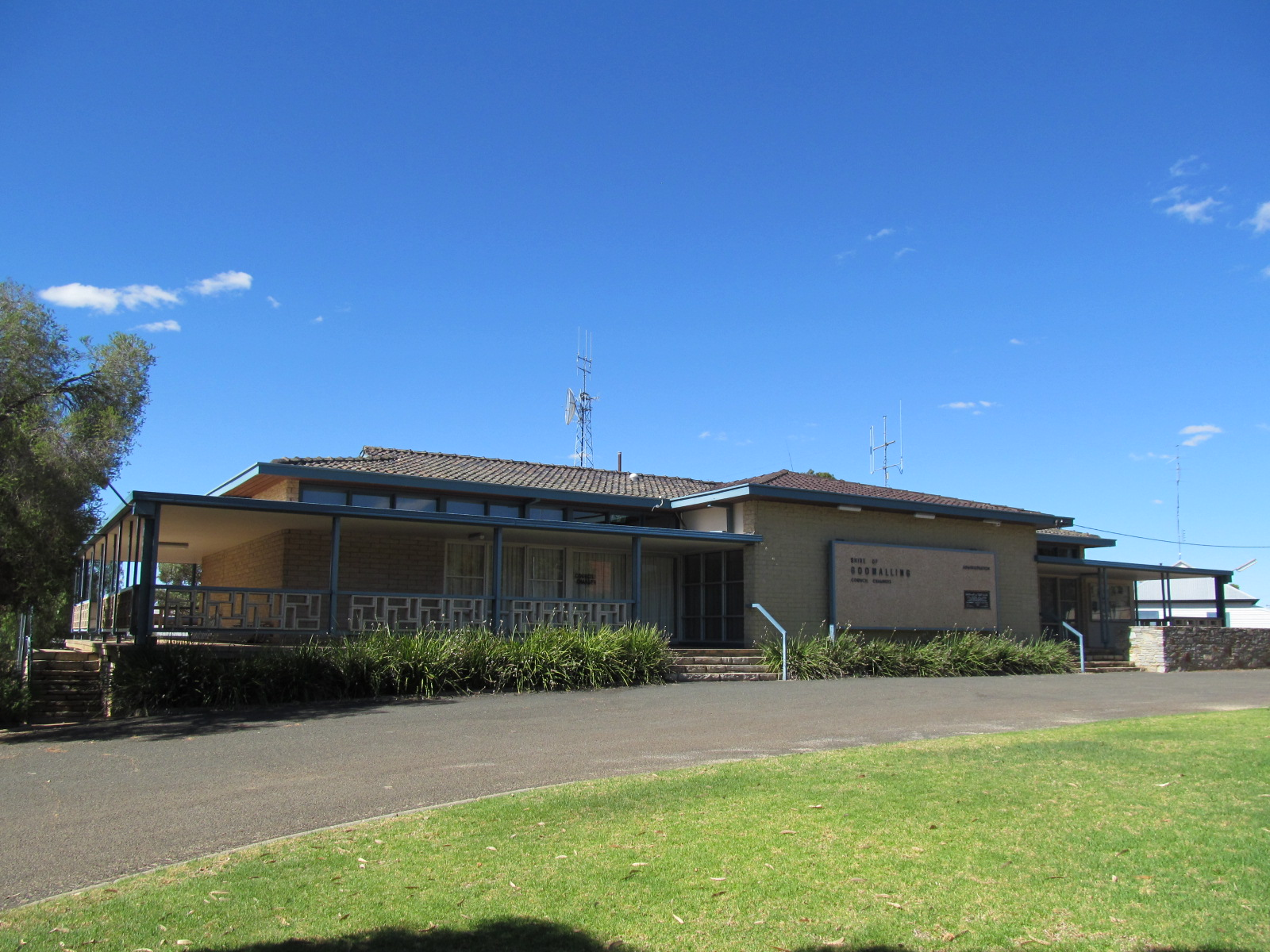
- The Goomalling Shire offices

- Interactive map of Shire of Goomalling
- Country: Australia
- State: Western Australia
- Region: Wheatbelt
- Established: 1895
- Council seat: Goomalling

Government
  - Shire President: Barry Haywood
  - State electorate: Electoral district of Central Wheatbelt
  - Federal division: Durack

Area
  - Total: 1,837.2 km^{2} (709.3 sq mi)

Population
  - Total: 955 (LGA 2021)
- Website: Shire of Goomalling
LGAs around Shire of Goomalling
Victoria Plains	Wongan-Ballidu	Dowerin
Toodyay	Shire of Goomalling	Dowerin
Toodyay	Northam	Cunderdin

The Shire of Goomalling is a local government area in the Wheatbelt region of Western Australia, about 132 kilometres (82 mi) northeast of Perth, the state capital. The Shire covers an area of 2,836 square kilometres (1,095 sq mi) and its seat of government is the town of Goomalling.

== History ==
On 18 January 1895, the Goomalling Road District was created. On 1 July 1961, it became a Shire following the enactment of the Local Government Act 1960.

== Wards ==
The shire has been divided into 4 wards:

- Town Ward (4 councillors)
- North Ward (2 councillors)
- South Ward (2 councillors)
- Central Ward (1 councillor)

== Towns and localities ==
The towns and localities of the Shire of Goomalling with population and size figures based on the most recent Australian census:

Locality	Population	Area	Map
Cunjardine	20 (SAL 2016)	150.6 km^{2} (58.1 sq mi)	
Goomalling	508 (SAL 2021)	45.2 km^{2} (17.5 sq mi)	
Hulongine	26 (SAL 2021)	128.2 km^{2} (49.5 sq mi)	
Jennacubbine	56 (SAL 2021)	71.5 km^{2} (27.6 sq mi)	
Karranadgin	86 (SAL 2021)	406.8 km^{2} (157.1 sq mi)	
Konnongorring	76 (SAL 2021)	443.8 km^{2} (171.4 sq mi)	
Mumberkine	57 (SAL 2021)	140.1 km^{2} (54.1 sq mi)	
Rossmore	23 (SAL 2021)	60.2 km^{2} (23.2 sq mi)	
Ucarty West	38 (SAL 2021)	115.5 km^{2} (44.6 sq mi)	
Walyormouring	36 (SAL 2021)	245.5 km^{2} (94.8 sq mi)	
Wongamine	39 (SAL 2016)	27.8 km^{2} (10.7 sq mi)	

== Population ==
Historical population

Year	Pop.	±% p.a.
1921	1,508	—
1933	1,803	+1.50%
1947	1,403	−1.78%
1954	1,721	+2.96%
1961	1,567	−1.33%
1966	1,567	+0.00%
1971	1,444	−1.62%
1976	1,254	−2.78%
1981	1,269	+0.24%

Year	Pop.	±% p.a.
1986	1,206	−1.01%
1991	1,084	−2.11%
1996	1,035	−0.92%
2001	939	−1.93%
2006	935	−0.09%
2011	985	+1.05%
2016	1,033	+0.96%
2021	955	−1.56%

== Heritage-listed places ==
As of 2023, 38 places are heritage-listed in the Shire of Goomalling, of which two are on the State Register of Heritage Places.

Place name	Place #	Street name	Suburb or town	Co-ordinates	Built	State registered	Notes & former names	Photo
Goomalling Post Office & Quarters	1114	Railway Terrace	Goomalling	31.298797°S 116.827049°E	1910	2 June 1998		
Slater Homestead	3522	Goomalling-Dowerin Road	Goomalling	31.272924°S 116.845872°E	1856	23 January 2004		
