= Shire of Koorda =

Local government area in the Wheatbelt region of Western Australia

Coordinates: 30°49′52″S 117°29′02″E

- Local government area
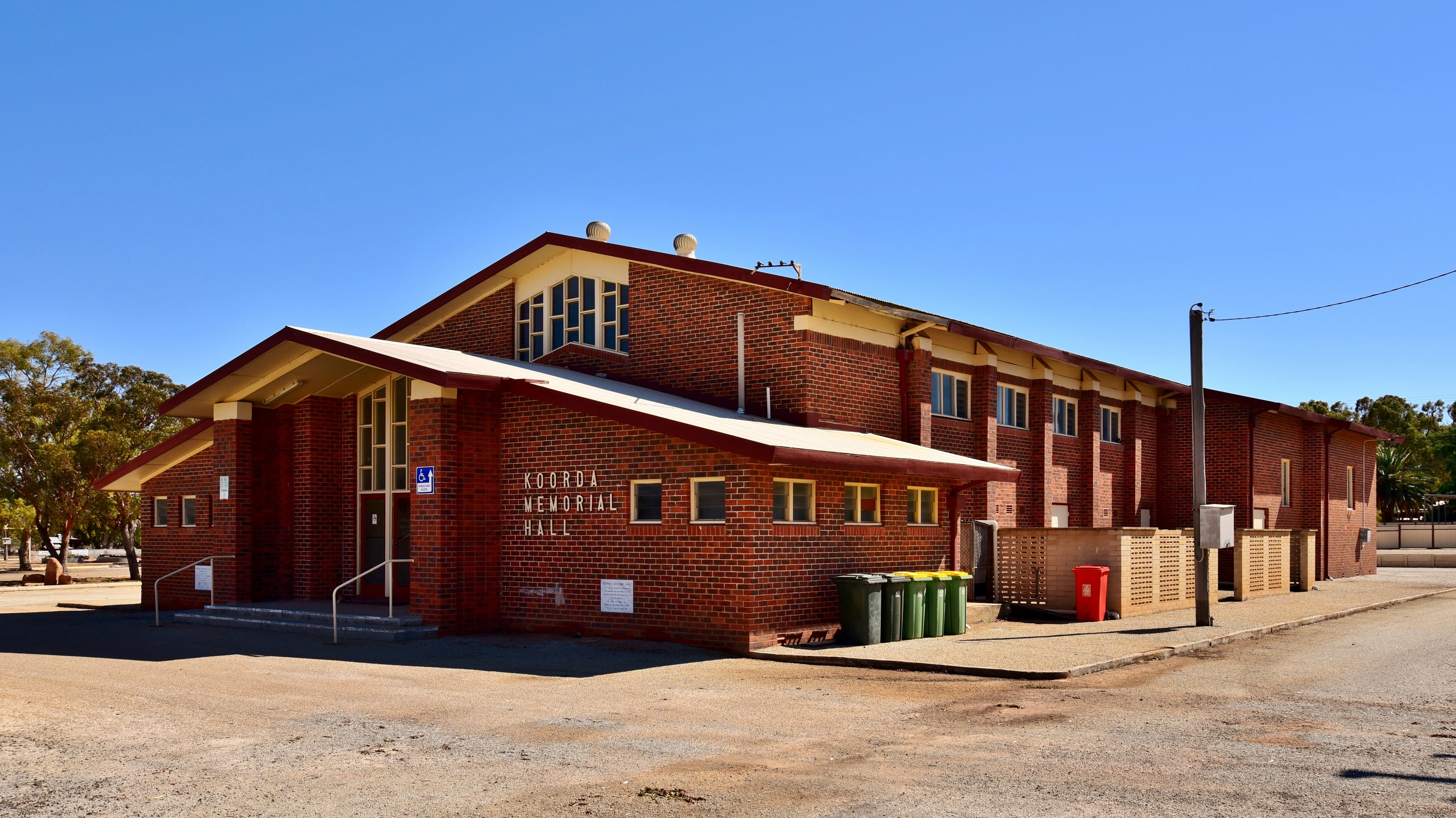
- Koorda Memorial Hall, 2018

- Interactive map of Shire of Koorda
- Country: Australia
- State: Western Australia
- Region: Wheatbelt
- Established: 1927
- Council seat: Koorda

Government
  - Shire President: Jannah Stratford
  - State electorate: Central Wheatbelt
  - Federal division: Durack

Area
  - Total: 2,835.7 km^{2} (1,094.9 sq mi)

Population
  - Total: 361 (LGA 2021)
- Website: Shire of Koorda
LGAs around Shire of Koorda
Dalwallinu	Dalwallinu	Mount Marshall
Wongan Ballidu	Shire of Koorda	Mount Marshall
Dowerin	Wyalkatchem	Trayning

The Shire of Koorda is a local government area in the Wheatbelt region of Western Australia, about 240 kilometres (150 mi) northeast of Perth, the state capital. The Shire covers an area of 2,836 square kilometres (1,095 sq mi) and its seat of government is the town of Koorda.

== History ==
The Koorda Road District was gazetted out of land previously administered by the Wyalkatchem and Mount Marshall Road Boards on 18 November 1927. On 1 July 1961, it became a Shire under the Local Government Act 1960, which reformed all remaining road districts into shires.

== Wards ==
The shire does not have wards but has seven councillors.

== Towns and localities ==
The towns and localities of the Shire of Koorda with population and size figures based on the most recent Australian census:

Locality	Population	Area	Map
Badgerin Rock	25 (SAL 2021)	243.6 km^{2} (94.1 sq mi)	
Booralaming	22 (SAL 2021)	304.7 km^{2} (117.6 sq mi)	
Dukin	33 (SAL 2021)	205 km^{2} (79 sq mi)	
Koorda	213 (SAL 2021)	9.6 km^{2} (3.7 sq mi)	
Kulja	20 (SAL 2021)	526.7 km^{2} (203.4 sq mi)	
Lake Margarette	16 (SAL 2021)	327.8 km^{2} (126.6 sq mi)	
Mollerin	25 (SAL 2021)	798 km^{2} (308 sq mi)	
Newcarlbeon	15 (SAL 2021)	414.5 km^{2} (160.0 sq mi)	

== Population ==
Historical population

Year	Pop.	±% p.a.
1933	728	—
1947	593	−1.45%
1954	823	+4.79%
1961	953	+2.12%
1966	1,080	+2.53%
1971	1,016	−1.21%
1976	902	−2.35%
1981	746	−3.73%

Year	Pop.	±% p.a.
1986	670	−2.13%
1991	613	−1.76%
2001	431	−3.46%
2006	430	−0.05%
2011	437	+0.32%
2016	414	−1.08%
2021	361	−2.70%

== Heritage-listed places ==
As of 2023, 71 places are heritage-listed in the Shire of Koorda, of which none are on the State Register of Heritage Places.
