= Burracoppin, Western Australia =

Burracoppin
- Town
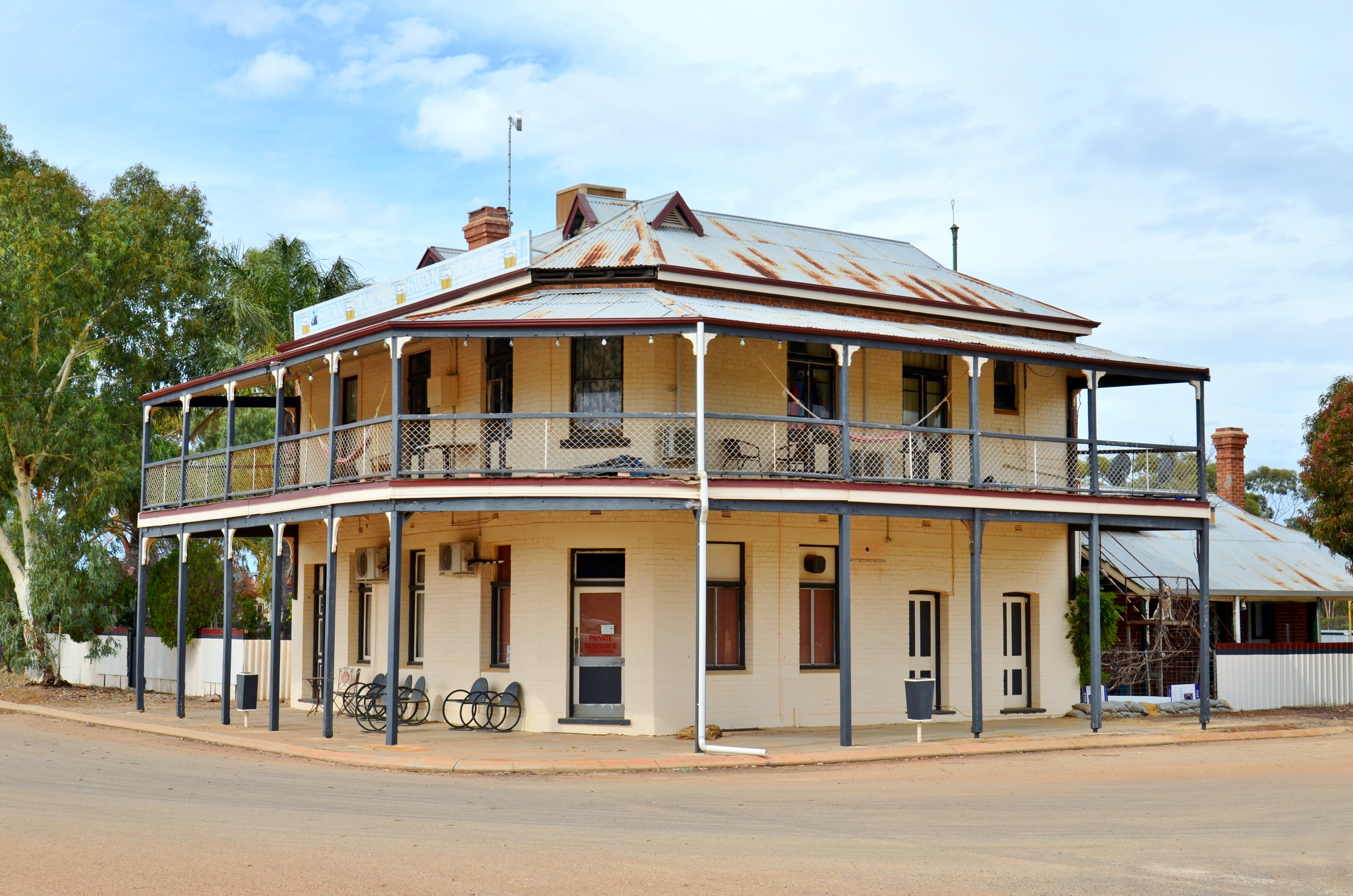
- The former Burracoppin Hotel, 2017

- Interactive map of Burracoppin
- Coordinates: 31.397°S 118.477°E
- Country: Australia
- State: Western Australia
- LGA: Shire of Merredin
- Location: 283 km (176 mi) east of Perth; 25 km (16 mi) east of Merredin
- Established: 1891

Government
  - State electorate: Central Wheatbelt
  - Federal division: Durack

Area
  - Total: 312.7 km^{2} (120.7 sq mi)

Population
  - Total: 114 (SAL 2021)
- Postcode: 6421

Burracoppin is a townsite on the Great Eastern Highway, east of Merredin in the Wheatbelt region of Western Australia.

== History ==
The town was gazetted in 1891. It takes its name from Burracoppin Rock, a nearby granite rock, the name of which was first recorded in 1864 as Burancooping Rock. It was also shown as Lansdowne Hill in 1836. It is an Aboriginal name said to mean "near a big hill".

It is situated on the Eastern Railway and is a stop on the Transwa's Prospector rural railway service.

It is the setting for the novel Mr Jelly's Business by Arthur W. Upfield, one in the series of Napoleon Bonaparte whodunits.

Burracoppin is also the site where the first Rabbit Proof Fence (No. 1) was started in 1901, with construction heading south to Esperance and north towards Port Hedland. Burracoppin was the main depot for the Rabbit Proof Fence. All gates through the fence and wells for the fence runners (those who look after the fence) were numbered from this town. Parts of the original fence are still viewable in Burracoppin along with some of the original gates.

In 1932 the Wheat Pool of Western Australia announced that the town would have two grain elevators, each fitted with an engine, installed at the railway siding. The first was installed the following year and was able to handle 1,800 bags of wheat per day.

The main industry in town is wheat farming with the town being a CBH Group receival site.

== Rail services ==
Transwa's Prospector service, which runs each way between East Perth and Kalgoorlie once or twice each day, stops at Burracoppin.
