= Shire of Westonia =

Local government area in the Wheatbelt region of Western Australia

- Local government area
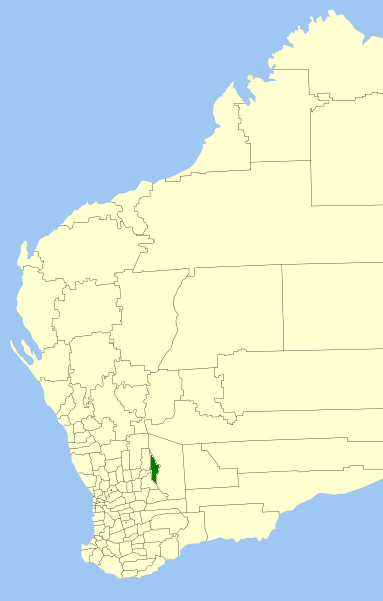
- Location in Western Australia

- Interactive map of Shire of Westonia
- Country: Australia
- State: Western Australia
- Region: Wheatbelt
- Council seat: Westonia

Government
  - Shire President: Karin Day
  - State electorate: Central Wheatbelt
  - Federal division: Durack

Area
  - Total: 3,268 km^{2} (1,262 sq mi)

Population
  - Total: 248 (LGA 2021)
- Website: Shire of Westonia
LGAs around Shire of Westonia
Mount Marshall	Yilgarn
Mukinbudin	Shire of Westonia	Yilgarn
Merredin	Merredin

The Shire of Westonia is a local government area in the eastern Wheatbelt region of Western Australia. Its seat of government is the small town of Westonia.

== Toponymy ==
The Shire takes its name from its seat of government, which, in turn, is named after Alfred David Weston (17 May 1876 – 26 September 1924), a sandalwood cutter and part-time prospector who discovered gold in the area, near Bodallin Soak, in 1910.

== Geography ==
=== Overview ===
Located 312 km (194 mi) east of the state capital, Perth, and 306 km (190 mi) west of Kalgoorlie, the Shire extends approximately 150 km (93 mi) north to south and 40 km (25 mi) west to east.

It is made up primarily of the town site of Westonia and the localities of Walgoolan, Carrabin, Warralakin and Elachbutting. Its total area is 3,268 km^{2} (1,262 sq mi).

The Clearing Line, which marks the eastern limit of wheat cropping in Western Australia, passes through the Shire. At its southern end, the Shire is traversed by the Great Eastern Highway.

The Shire's main industries are farming of wheat and sheep, and gold mining.

=== Climate ===
The Shire has a warm Mediterranean climate, with dry summers and rainy winters. Maximum summer temperatures in the Shire range from 28 °C (82 °F) to 42 °C (108 °F), with an average of about 33 °C (91 °F) Winter maximum temperatures range from 12 °C (54 °F) to 21 °C (70 °F), with an average of about 20 °C (68 °F).

As of 2023, the Shire's annual average rainfall was 331 mm (13.0 in), mostly during winter. Rainfall has declined substantially since 1975.

About half the Shire had been declared bushfire prone as of 2019. The prone areas occur throughout the Shire, with larger expanses in its more vegetated northern half. Much of the landscape surrounding and within the Westonia town site had been identified as bushfire prone.

=== Flora and fauna ===
Approximately 40%, or 130,985 ha (323,670 acres), of the Shire contains protected remnant native vegetation. Individual rare or threatened plants are similarly protected.

The Westonia Common, which surrounds the Westonia townsite, is home to numerous stands of protected native vegetation. Additionally, a 2015 survey of 1,658 km (1,030 mi) of the Shire’s roadsides indicated that its roadside vegetation was of good quality compared to other Wheatbelt shires. That vegetation provides linkages between areas of remnant bushland.

The Shire also has two protected but threatened ecological communities (TECs): ‘Eucalypt Woodlands of the Western Australian Wheatbelt’; and ‘Granite Pool Invertebrate Assemblages’. The woodlands are dominated by a complex mix of eucalypts of two types, above a complex and varied understorey. This type of woodlands was originally the most commpn type found in the Wheatbelt, and the proportion of original woodlands remaining here is high compared to elsewhere in the Wheatbelt. Further remnant vegetation continues to grow on private landholdings, including many farms that retain vegetation strips.

The Shire is also home to 12 protected species of fauna.

=== Geology and landform ===
The surface terrain of the Shire is laterite, clay, and sand, underlain by the Yilgarn Block. The Shire's major mineral is gold.

=== Landscape ===
The streetscape of the Westonia townsite has replicas of pioneer buildings, with sculpture parks in closed-off streets. Surrounding the townsite is extensive bushland. A dramatic landscape peculiarity just north of the townsite is the Edna May open cut gold mine.

== History ==
The Westonia Road District was established on 30 June 1916. On 1 July 1961, it became the Shire of Westonia under the Local Government Act 1960, which reformed all remaining road districts into shires.

In April 2012, residents of the Shire rejected a proposed merger with the neighbouring larger Shire of Yilgarn, with 82 percent of voters opposing the merger.

== Wards ==
The Shire initially had a ward system with two elected members representing the north, south, west and town wards (for a total of eight members). However, following the 2009 local government elections the Shire of Westonia's ward system was abolished and the number of elected members was dropped to six.

== Towns and localities ==
The towns and localities of the Shire of Westonia with population and size figures based on the most recent Australian census:

Locality	Population	Area	Map
Boodarockin	5 (SAL 2021)	322.6 km^{2} (124.6 sq mi)	
Carrabin	0 (SAL 2021)	157.1 km^{2} (60.7 sq mi)	
Elachbutting	9 (SAL 2021)	990.3 km^{2} (382.4 sq mi)	
Walgoolan	64 (SAL 2021)	527.9 km^{2} (203.8 sq mi)	
Warrachuppin	14 (SAL 2021)	447.9 km^{2} (172.9 sq mi)	
Warralakin	26 (SAL 2021)	567.1 km^{2} (219.0 sq mi)	
Westonia	129 (SAL 2021)	306.6 km^{2} (118.4 sq mi)	

== Population ==
Historical population

Year	Pop.	±% p.a.
1921	842	—
1933	1,032	+1.71%
1947	547	−4.43%
1954	487	−1.65%
1961	435	−1.60%
1966	612	+7.07%
1971	473	−5.02%
1976	510	+1.52%
1981	453	−2.34%

Year	Pop.	±% p.a.
1986	484	+1.33%
1991	282	−10.24%
1996	292	+0.70%
2001	237	−4.09%
2006	213	−2.11%
2011	277	+5.40%
2016	304	+1.88%
2021	248	−3.99%

== Heritage-listed places ==
As of 2023, 69 places are heritage-listed in the Shire of Westonia, of which two are on the State Register of Heritage Places, the Edna May Tavern in Westonia and the Goldfields Water Supply Scheme.

Place name	Place #	Street name	Suburb or town	Co-ordinates	Built	State registered	Notes & former names	Photo
Edna May Tavern	2707	Wolfram Street	Westonia	31.302758°S 118.696696°E	1915	26 August 2008	Edna May Hotel, Westonia Hotel	
Goldfields Water Supply Scheme	16610					Stretches from Mundaring Weir in Perth to the Eastern Goldfields, particularly Coolgardie and Kalgoorlie		
