= Merredin, Western Australia =

Town in the Wheatbelt region of Western Australia

Merredin
- Town
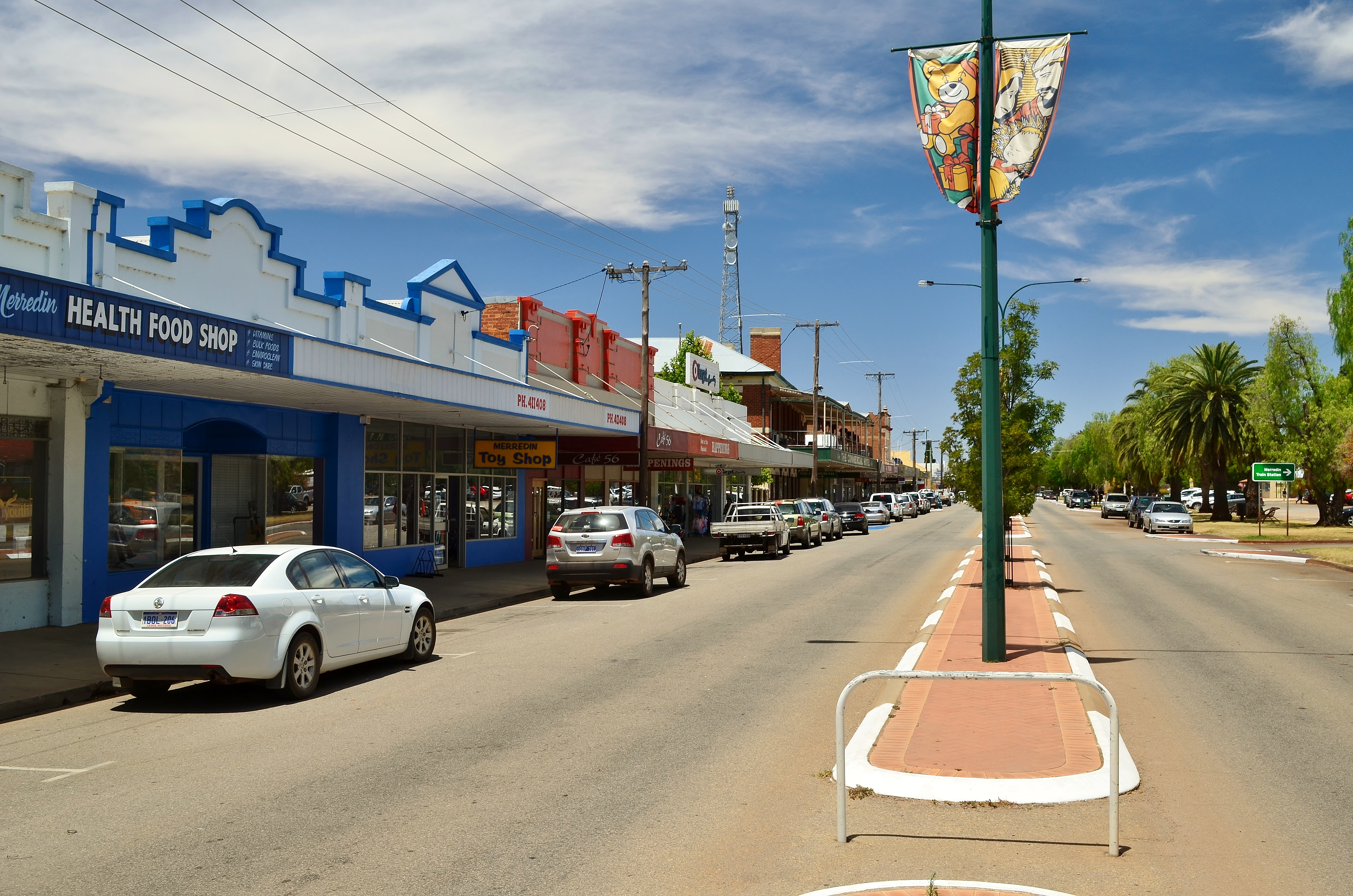
- Barrack Street, Merredin, 2013.

- Interactive map of Merredin
- Coordinates: 31.482°S 118.279°E
- Country: Australia
- State: Western Australia
- LGA: Shire of Merredin
- Location: 256 km (159 mi) east of Perth; 326 km (203 mi) west of Kalgoorlie
- Established: 1890s

Government
  - State electorate: Central Wheatbelt
  - Federal division: Durack

Area
  - Total: 250.1 km^{2} (96.6 sq mi)
- Elevation: 318 m (1,043 ft)

Population
  - Total: 2,384 (UCL 2021)
- Postcode: 6415
- Mean max temp: 24.7 °C (76.5 °F)
- Mean min temp: 10.7 °C (51.3 °F)
- Annual rainfall: 314.4 mm (12.38 in)

Merredin (/ˈmɛrədɪn/) is a town in Western Australia, located in the central Wheatbelt roughly midway between Perth and Kalgoorlie, on Route 94, Great Eastern Highway. It is located on the route of the Goldfields Water Supply Scheme, and as a result is also on the Golden Pipeline Heritage Trail.

It is connected by public transport to Perth via the Prospector and MerredinLink rail services.

== History ==
Merredin's history varies from that of other wheat-belt towns in Western Australia in the sense that it started as a stopping place on the way to the goldfields. The first European explorer into the area was Surveyor General J.S. Roe, who travelled through the region in 1836 but was not impressed by its dryness and the low rainfall.

By the 1850s sandalwood cutters were in the area but there was little agriculture. It was not until Assistant Surveyor Charles Cooke Hunt explored the area in the period 1864–66 that it began to open up. Hunt saw the pastoral potential but realised the importance of water. He called the area Hampton Plains after John Stephen Hampton, Governor of Western Australia 1862–68.

Hunt made five journeys through the area. Of the five journeys the first was exploratory (1864), the second established a track which moved from waterhole to waterhole (1865) and the third built a series of wells and dams (the Hunt's Dam at Merredin is located about 10 kilometres (6.2 mi) north of town off the Merredin-Chandler Road). The result was a road which later became known as the York to Goldfields road and, until the arrival of the railway, was the only link between the coast and the gold towns of Kalgoorlie and Coolgardie.

It is almost certain that Hunt climbed Merredin Peak (a short distance out of town to the north) and that he heard the town's name from the local Aboriginal people. Hunt claimed that the local Aborigines referred to the place as "Merriding" while other explanations suggest that the name comes from "merrit-in" – "the place of the merrit" (Eucalyptus flocktoniae or 'Merritt' is a tree which was used for making spears) – or that it was the name used by the Aborigines to describe the "huge bare granite rock" which the locals call Merredin Rock but which is officially named Merredin Peak.

In the late 1860s a number of large pastoral leases were taken up in the area but no township evolved. As late as 1889, when Assistant Surveyor Henry King set up camp on the north side of Merredin Rock, there was still no township. The first settlement was established to the north of Merredin Peak on the York to the Goldfields road but it was hastily moved when the railway, which could not follow the gradients of Hunts Road, was built a few kilometres to the south.

In 1888 the area to the east of Merredin was officially proclaimed a goldfield and over the next decade prospectors and fossickers poured through the area. Gold was discovered at Coolgardie in 1892 and at Kalgoorlie a year later. At first the prospectors used Hunt's waterholes road and this meant that they passed through the site of the modern town. In 1893 the narrow-gauge (1,067 mm, 3 ft 6 in) railway that was being continually extended eastwards from Perth, reached the town. Merredin's importance as a town was directly related to the establishment of a superb water catchment scheme on Merredin Peak. The narrow-gauge railway was extended eastwards from Merredin to Southern Cross in July 1894, and to Kalgoorlie in January 1897.

A rock wall was built around the contours of Merredin Peak. It led to a 100 m (330 ft) channel which in turn led into a dam which had a storage capacity of 25 million litres (6.6 million US gallons). The scheme held every drop of water which landed on the Peak and directed it all into the dam which provided water for both the town and the railway. The entire structure is still intact and can be easily reached at the northern end of town. Constructed between 1893 and 1896, the Railway Dam ensured that Merredin would become much more than just another wheat-belt siding.

The need for the water from Merredin Peak disappeared in 1903 when C. Y. O'Connor's 565 km (351 mi) pipeline was completed. The pipeline joined the waterless goldfields at Kalgoorlie and Boulder with the plentiful supplies of water in the Helena River east of Perth. Merredin Peak's Railway Dam continued to supply water to the railway until 1968 and even today is still used as the water supply for the fountain outside the Merredin Railway Museum and railway station.

In 1904 the Agricultural Research Station was established. It was here that the Bencubbin strain of wheat was developed. Land in the present townsite was offered for sale in 1906 and by 1911 the Merredin Roads Board had been formed.

The narrow-gauge rail line from Merredin to Bruce Rock was built in 1913 to serve the developing sheep and wheat belt area of Western Australia, now known as the Great Southern. The final section of the Narrogin-Merredin narrow-gauge rail line, from Bruce Rock to Corrigin, was built in 1915, thus completing the narrow-gauge rail link that linked Merredin and Narrogin.

In 2023 Merredin was listed among several Western Australian towns to be affected by an outbreak of the venereal disease syphilis.

== Military history ==
During World War II, Merredin was the location of RAAF No.26 Inland Aircraft Fuel Depot (IAFD), built in 1942 and closed on 14 June 1944. It was situated on Cummings Street and has since had a house built on top. Usually consisting of 4 tanks, 31 fuel depots were built across Australia for the storage and supply of aircraft fuel for the RAAF and the US Army Air Corps at a total cost of £900,000 ($1,800,000).

== Pipeline pumping station number 4 ==
Merredin was the location of number 4 pumping station of the Goldfields Water Supply Scheme, which was rebuilt a number of times.

== Geography ==
=== Climate ===
Merredin experiences a steppe climate (Köppen climate classification BSh).

Climate data for Merredin
Month	Jan	Feb	Mar	Apr	May	Jun	Jul	Aug	Sep	Oct	Nov	Dec	Year
Mean daily maximum °C (°F)	33.7 (92.7)	33.0 (91.4)	30.2 (86.4)	25.3 (77.5)	20.6 (69.1)	17.2 (63.0)	16.3 (61.3)	17.2 (63.0)	20.4 (68.7)	24.6 (76.3)	28.4 (83.1)	31.9 (89.4)	24.9 (76.8)
Mean daily minimum °C (°F)	17.7 (63.9)	17.9 (64.2)	16.1 (61.0)	12.7 (54.9)	8.9 (48.0)	6.8 (44.2)	5.6 (42.1)	5.4 (41.7)	6.7 (44.1)	9.5 (49.1)	13.0 (55.4)	15.7 (60.3)	11.3 (52.3)
Average precipitation mm (inches)	13.8 (0.54)	15.6 (0.61)	20.5 (0.81)	23.5 (0.93)	41.2 (1.62)	50.3 (1.98)	51.0 (2.01)	39.0 (1.54)	25.8 (1.02)	18.2 (0.72)	13.9 (0.55)	13.8 (0.54)	326.5 (12.85)
Average rainy days	1.7	1.7	2.5	3.1	5.7	7.9	8.6	7.4	4.8	3.5	2.3	1.7	50.9
Source: Australian Bureau of Meteorology

== Economy ==
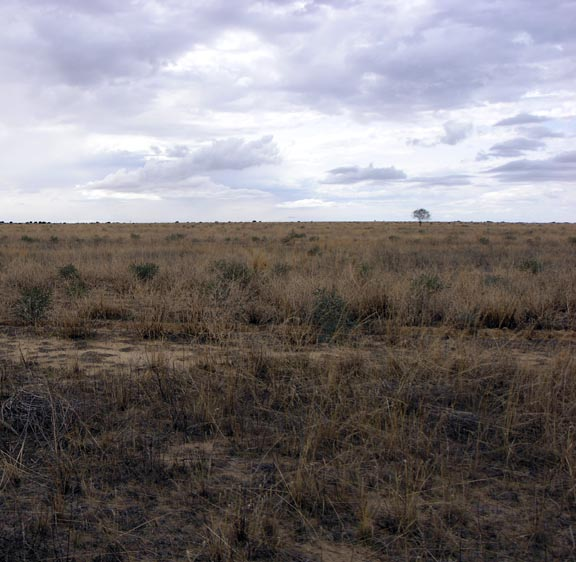
Rehabilitation project

The agricultural land around Merredin produces 40% of Western Australia's wheat output. As a focal point for the region, Merredin's local bulk handling co-operative receives and processes in excess of a million tonnes of grain every year. The silos at the train facilities to the west of the main town are the biggest of their type in the southern hemisphere.

One of the biggest problems to face the agricultural industry in Merredin is salinity. Extensive damage to buildings and roads is caused by rising saline groundwater. A recent study showed that the main source of this water is Merredin townsite itself. Roads, footpaths, buildings and open space have replaced native vegetation adapted to use up every drop of rain. Since the problem arose in the early 1970s, farmers and townspeople have been participating in a number of programs to improve the soil conditions, with some limited success.

=== Merredin Aerodrome ===
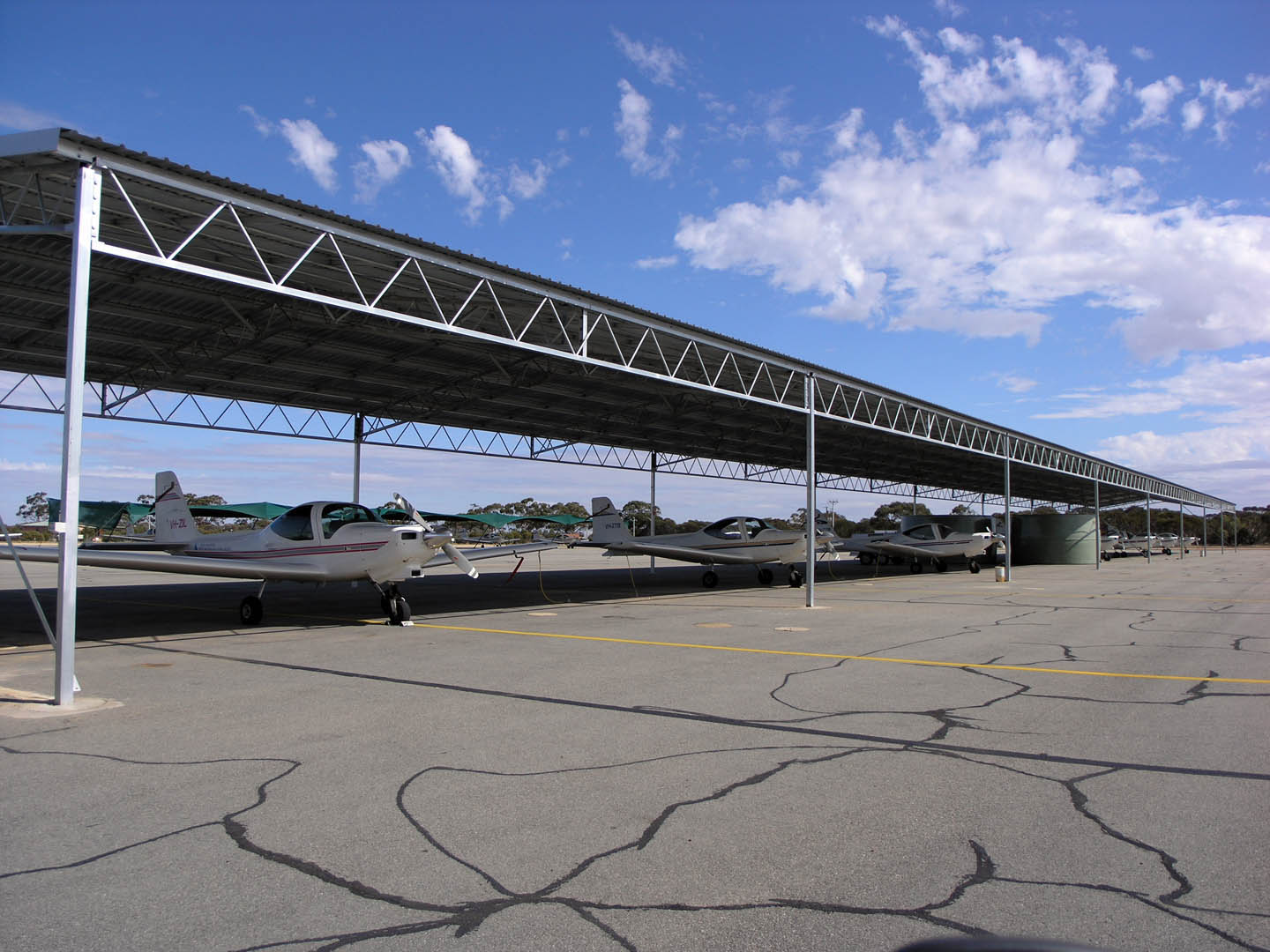
China Southern West Australian Flying College, Merredin

Merredin aerodrome was leased under a 100-year arrangement by China Southern West Australian Flying College (CSWAFC), a joint venture between China Southern Airlines and CAE in 1996, and was used as one of two pilot training facilities until September 2016. CSWAFC also operated from Jandakot Airport in Perth until 2020. Merredin airport was leased for the sum of $1 with the state government banking that investment would follow.

The partnership in the years since has been successful. Upgraded facilities include bitumen runways, an operations viewing platform (which does not fulfil the regulatory requirements of a control tower), fire control equipment, hangars, classrooms, and housing. Although the aerodrome is leased by China Southern West Australian Flying College, the Royal Flying Doctor Service and private users still have access.

As of September 2016, the training school suspended operations in Merredin due to its inability to attract sufficient numbers of experienced staff with the appropriate regulatory approvals. Since then, issues have been raised over the leasehold arrangements.

The aerodrome was put up for sale in June 2021.

== Transport ==
Merredin railway station is located on the Eastern Goldfields railway line. The original 1893 structure was replaced in August 1969. It is the terminus for the MerredinLink from Perth and a calling point for the Prospector from Perth to Kalgoorlie.

== Things to see ==
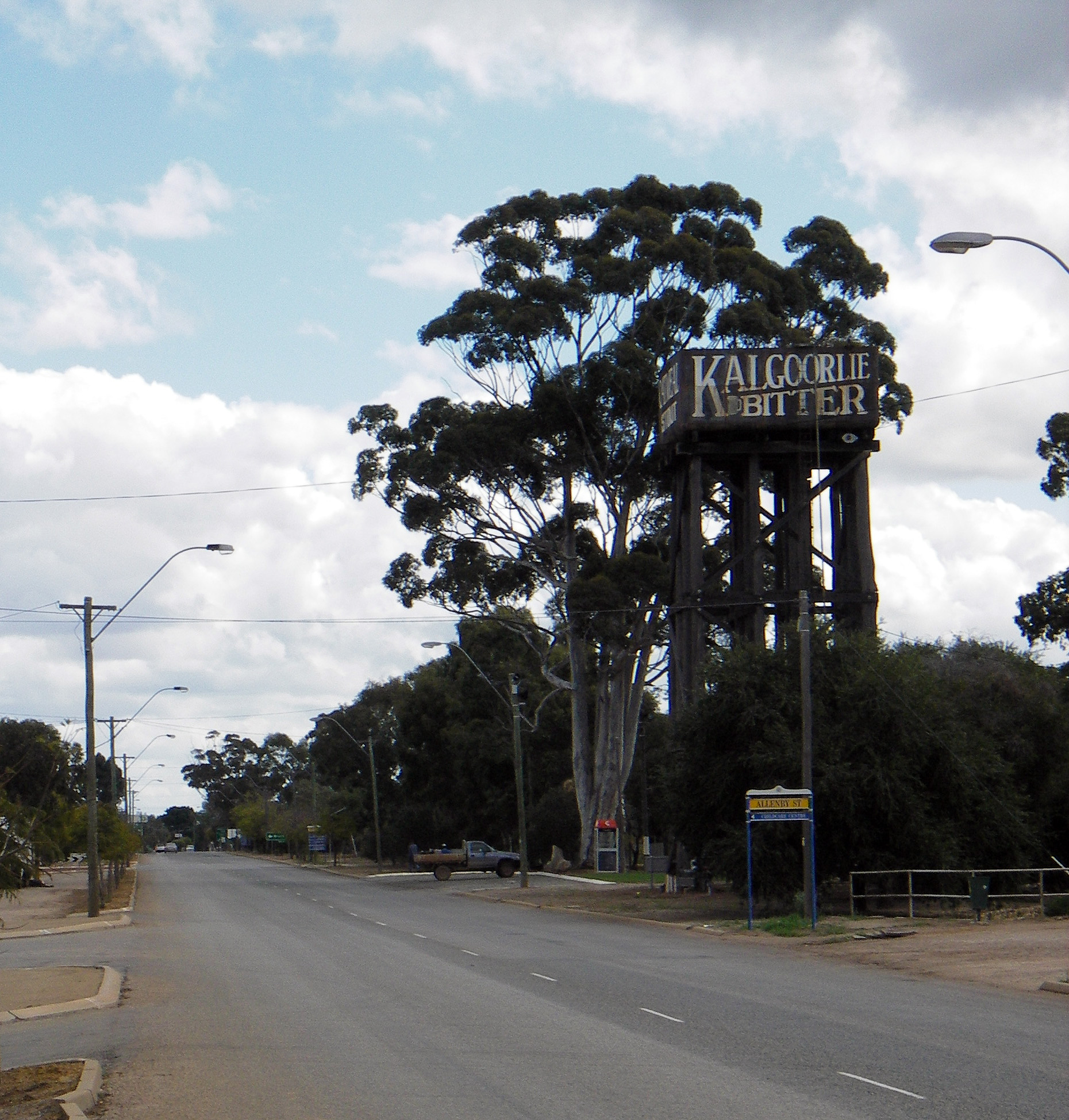
Merredin Railway Water Tower and Great Eastern Highway

- Mangowine Homestead
- Pioneer Women Memorial Waterfall

== Notable people ==
The following people were either born or raised in Merredin.

- Tully Bevilaqua née Crook – women's basketball player for Indiana Fever in the US and in Australia, Canberra Capitals
- Hendy Cowan – former leader of the National party and Member for Merredin
- Tony Crook – former National Party politician and member for O'Connor, RFDS executive officer
- Jeff Garlett – former Swan Districts and former now Carlton footballer
- Geoffrey Gibbs AM – actor, head of the WA Academy of Performing Arts, Chairman of Trustees for the International Foundation for Arts and Culture
- Rick Hart – businessman and public speaker, former President of Fremantle Football Club
- Robert Juniper – landscape artist
- Ken McAullay – former WA and East Perth full back and WA Sheffield Shield cricketer
- Laurie Mayne – former Test cricketer born in Westonia
- Don Randall – Australian Liberal party politician, member for Canning until his death in 2015
- John Rutherford – first Western Australian cricketer to win a Test cap for Australia
- Nelly Thomas – winner of National Raw Comedy Competition in 2003
- Nicole Trunfio – won the Australian Search for a Supermodel series in 2003, then came third in the international version of the series.
- Arthur Upfield – author of Boney series; worked at Burracoppin
- Bill Walker OAM – football player in the WAFL. Winner of four Sandover Medals. Grew up in the neighbouring town of Narembeen. A former student of Merredin Senior High School.
