= Wheatbelt (Western Australia) =

Region of Western Australia

- Region
- Extent of Wheatbelt region
- Coordinates: 32°S 118°E
- Country: Australia
- State: Western Australia
- LGA: List; Beverley; Brookton; Bruce Rock; Chittering; Corrigin; Cuballing; Cunderdin; Dandaragan; Dalwallinu; Dowerin; Dumbleyung; Gingin; Goomalling; Kellerberrin; Kondinin; Koorda; Kulin; Lake Grace; Merredin; Moora; Mount Marshall; Mukinbudin; Narembeen; Narrogin; Northam; Nungarin; Pingelly; Quairading; Tammin; Toodyay; Trayning; Victoria Plains; Wagin; Wandering; West Arthur; Westonia; Wickepin; Williams; Wongan-Ballidu; Wyalkatchem; Yilgarn; York

Government
  - State electorates: Central Wheatbelt; Moore; Roe
  - Federal divisions: Durack; O'Connor; Bullwinkel

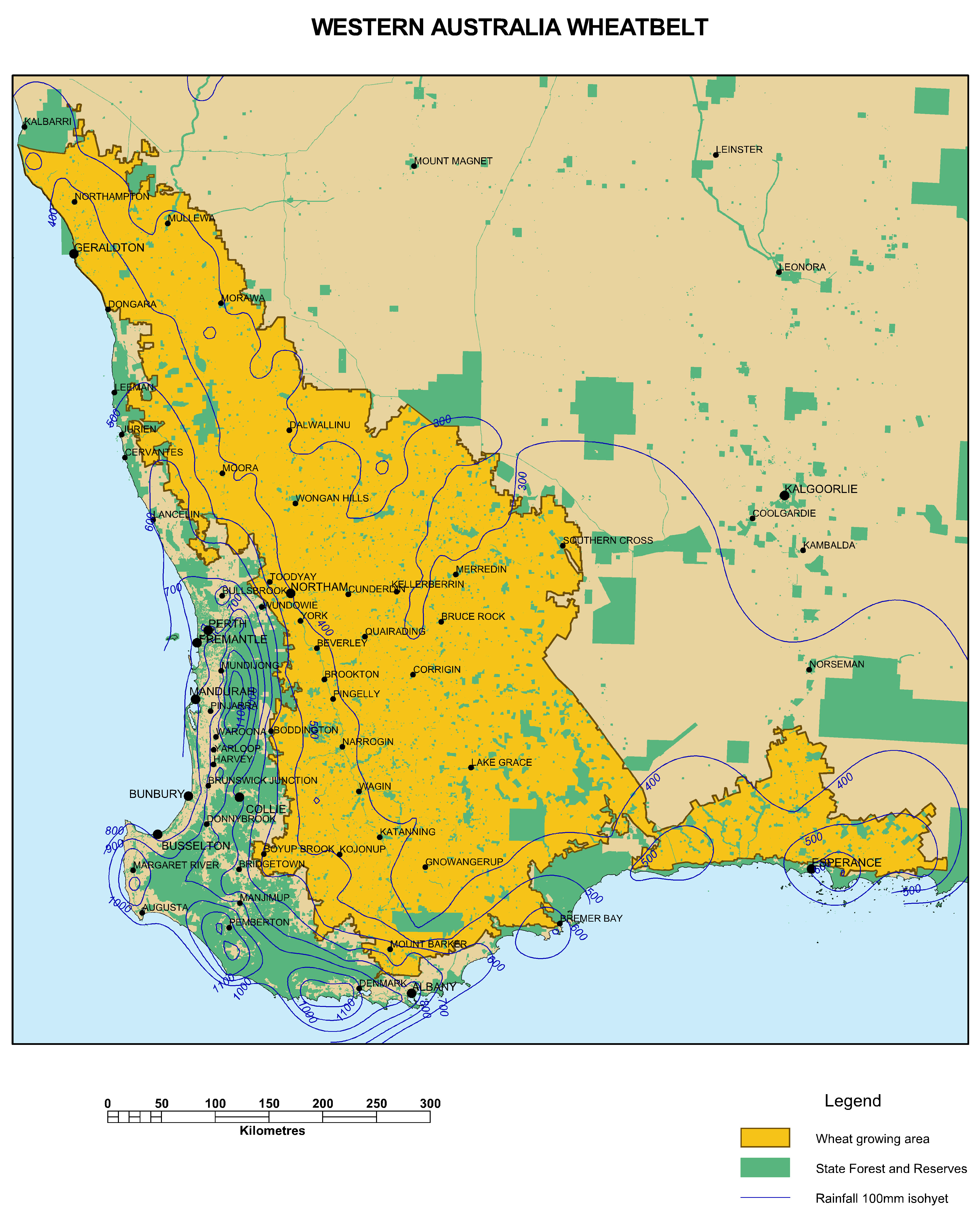
Location of the Wheatbelt within Western Australia

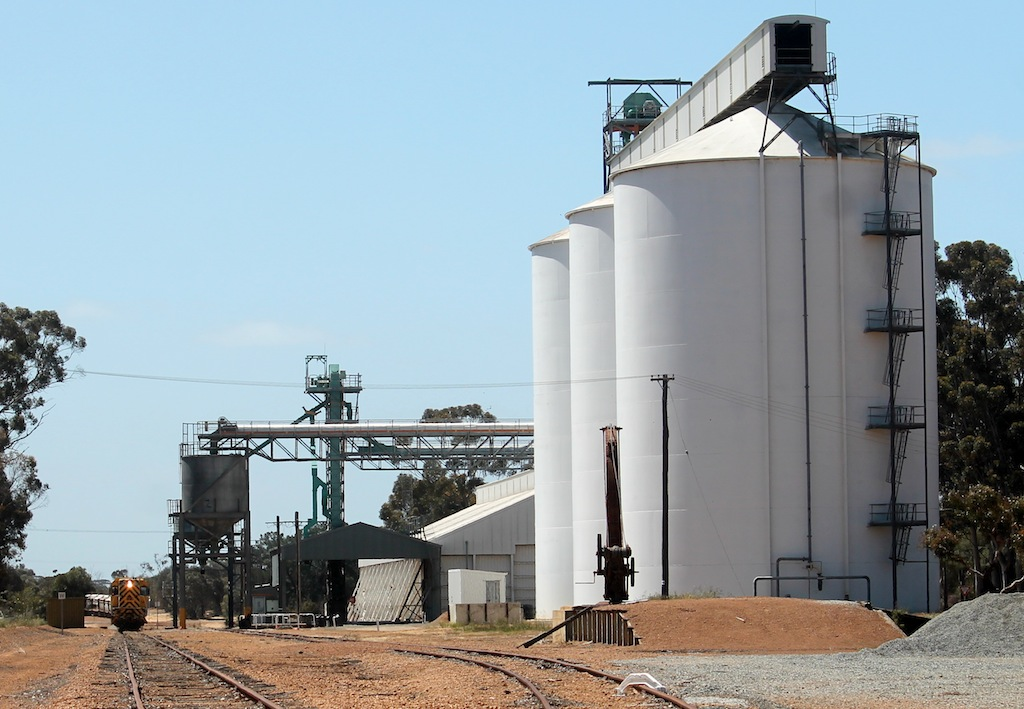
Grain receival and storage facility at Yealering

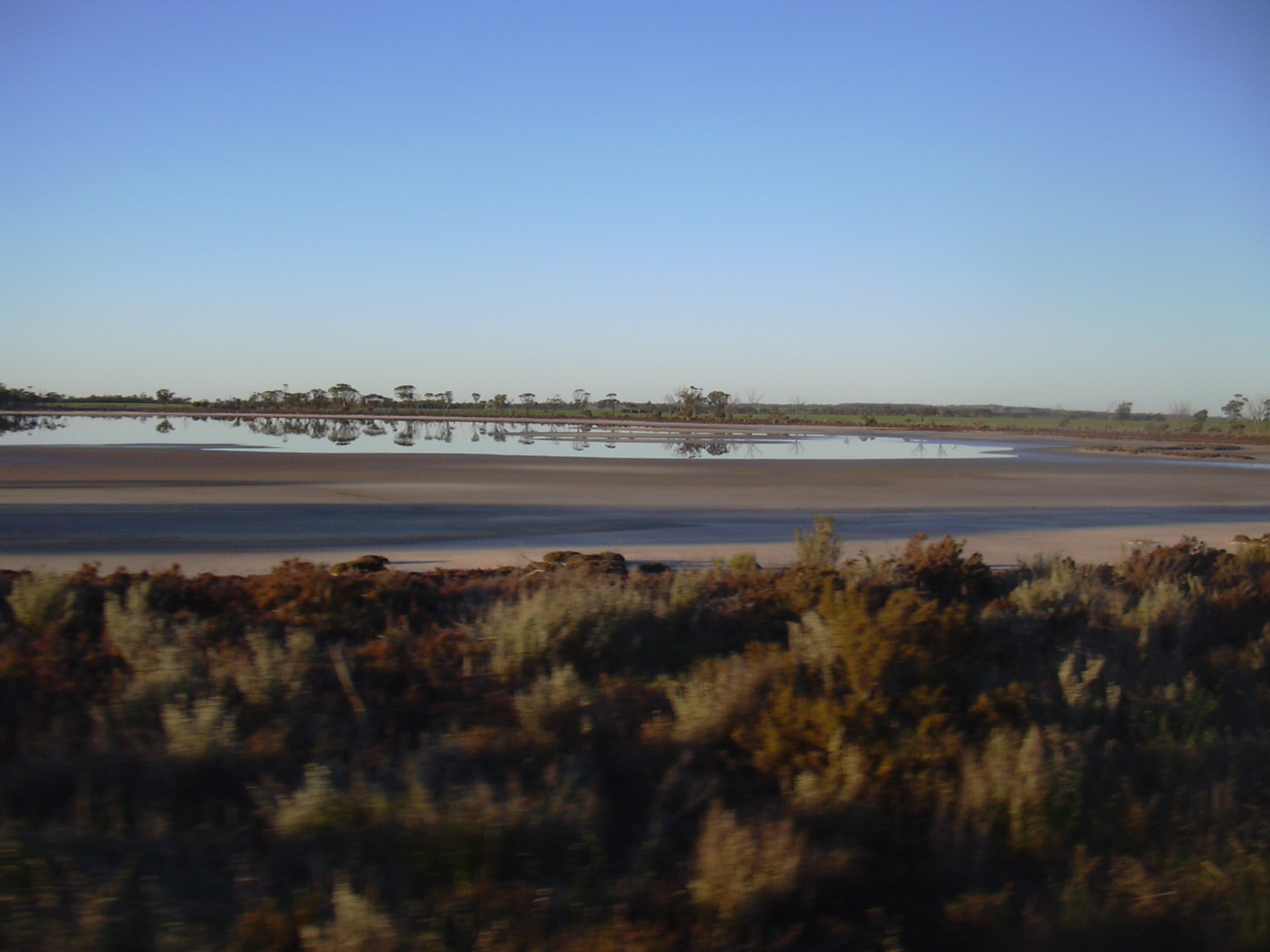
Land degradation caused by excessive clearing with resulting salinity, near Babakin

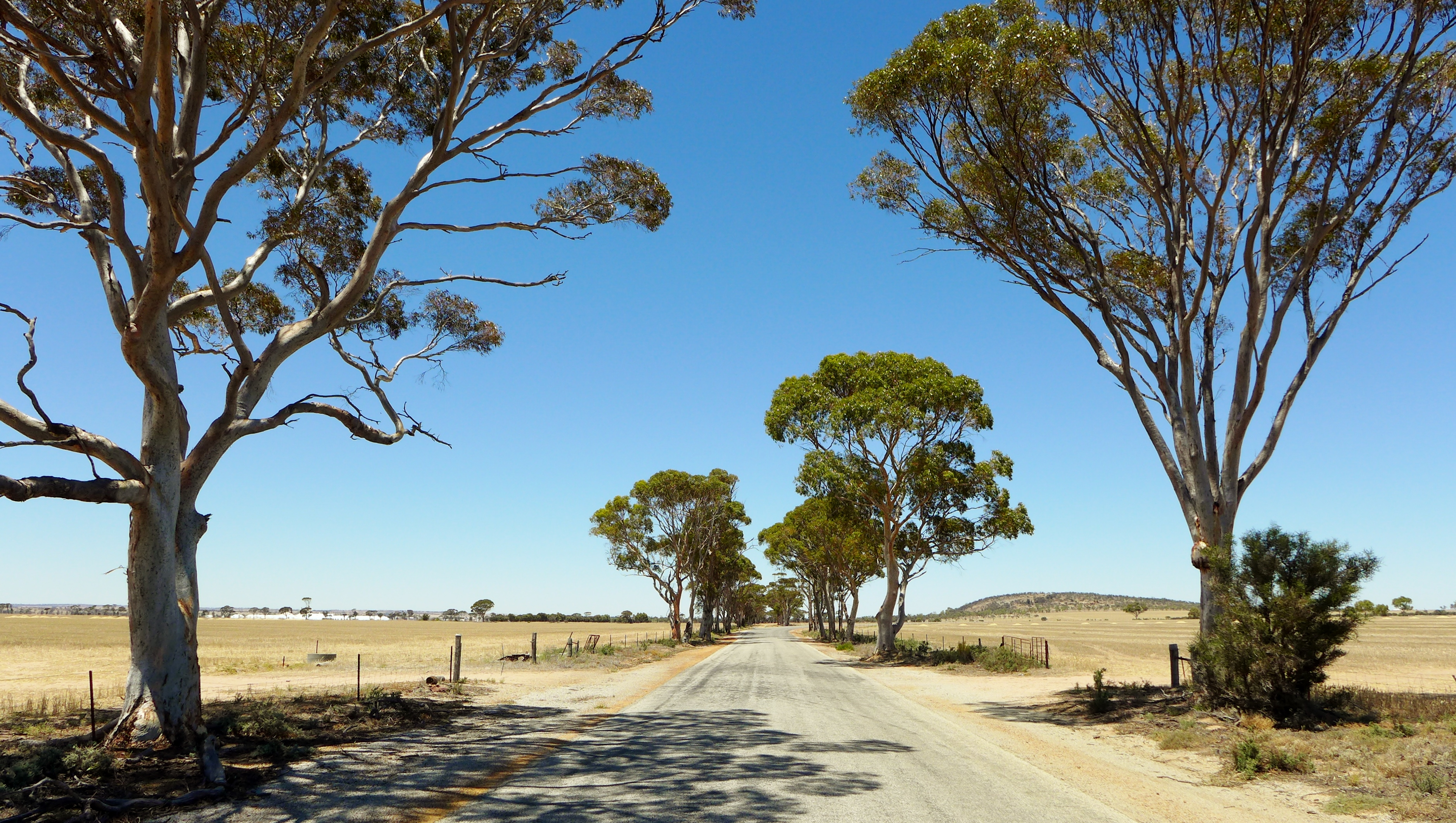
Bencubbin–Kellerberrin Road

The Wheatbelt is one of nine regions of Western Australia defined as administrative areas for the state's regional development, and a vernacular term for the area converted to agriculture during colonisation. (Note: Some early twentieth century references have "wheat belt" as two separate words.) It partially surrounds the Perth metropolitan area, extending north from Perth to the Mid West region, and east to the Goldfields–Esperance region. It is bordered to the south by the South West and Great Southern regions, and to the west by the Indian Ocean, the Perth metropolitan area, and the Peel region. Altogether, it has an area of 154,862 square kilometres (59,793 sq mi) (including islands).

The region has 42 local government authorities, with an estimated population of 75,000 residents. The Wheatbelt accounts for approximately three per cent of Western Australia's population.

== Ecosystems ==
The area, once a diverse ecosystem, reduced when clearing began in the 1890s with the removal of plant species such as eucalypt woodlands and mallee, is now home to around 11% of Australia's critically endangered plants.

A number of nationally threatened birds reside in the Wheatbelt, including the endangered Carnaby's black cockatoo and the vulnerable malleefowl.

The Wheatbelt encompasses a range of ecosystems and, as a result, there are a range of industries operating in the region.

In the Interim Biogeographic Regionalisation for Australia there are a number of subdivisions such as the Avon Wheatbelt (AVW), and a further breakdown of Avon Wheatbelt P1 (AW1) and Avon Wheatbelt P2 (AW2), Jarrah Forest, Geraldton Sandplains and Mallee regions.

== Industry and economy ==
Near the coast, the region receives relatively high rainfall and mild temperatures, and its 150 kilometres (93 mi) of coastline is a significant tourist area. In contrast, the eastern fringe is very arid, and is mainly used for pastoral farming of sheep. Mining of gold, nickel and iron ore also occurs. The remainder of the region is highly suited to agriculture, and is the source of nearly two thirds of the state's wheat production, half of its wool production, and the majority of its lamb and mutton, oranges, honey, cut flowers and a range of other agricultural and pastoral products.

== Change ==
With a range of climate and economic changes in the region, considerable effort is made by government at all levels to cope with the decline of some communities, and create opportunities for ventures that keep population in the region. Cultural change with population changes in many localities has been identified by local museums and historical societies, including online documentation.

- Bruce Rock
- Corrigin
- Cunderdin
- Dowerin
- Goomalling
- Hyden
- Kellerberrin
- Koorda
- Kulin
- Lake Grace
- Meckering
- Merredin
- Narrembeen
- Newdegate
- Nungarin
- Southern Cross
- Westonia
- Wyalkatchem
- Yelbeni

Also the literary tradition of writers including the wheatbelt in their writing included:

- Albert Facey
- Peter Cowan
- Dorothy Hewett
- Jack Davis
- Elizabeth Jolley
- John Kinsella

Lesser known writers also have the wheatbelt environment in their writing such as Lilian Wooster Greaves. Arthur Upfield set one of his Napoleon Bonaparte bush mysteries, Mr. Jelly's Business (also titled "Murder Down Under"), in the town of Burracoppin in the Wheat Belt.

== Transport ==
The Wheatbelt once had an extensive railway system, which transported bulk wheat grain. It has been reduced in part, while the main lines are being supported. Grain is transported on those lines to ports for export from the CBH grain receival points (grain silos), which are primarily located in the Wheatbelt region.

Six main highways radiating out from Perth serve the Wheatbelt: Brand Highway (north-west to Geraldton), Great Northern Highway (north-east to Wyndham), Great Eastern Highway (east to Kalgoorlie), Great Southern Highway (east to York, then south to Cranbrook), Brookton Highway (east-south-east to Brookton), and Albany Highway (south-east to Albany). A network of main roads connects towns within the Wheatbelt to each other, the highways, and neighbouring regions, with local roads providing additional links and access to smaller townsites. Roads are often named after the towns they connect.

== Local government areas ==
The following list is the shires listed in the Wheatbelt as designated by the Wheatbelt Development Commission. Some shires in adjoining regions are traditionally considered part of the Wheatbelt – there are shires in the Great Southern, Goldfields-Esperance and Mid West regions that are dominantly grain growing areas.

- Beverley
- Brookton
- Bruce Rock
- Chittering
- Corrigin
- Cuballing
- Cunderdin
- Dandaragan
- Dalwallinu
- Dowerin
- Dumbleyung
- Gingin
- Goomalling
- Kellerberrin
- Kondinin
- Koorda
- Kulin
- Lake Grace
- Merredin
- Moora
- Mount Marshall
- Mukinbudin
- Narembeen
- Narrogin
- Northam
- Nungarin
- Pingelly
- Quairading
- Tammin
- Toodyay
- Trayning
- Victoria Plains
- Wagin
- Wandering
- West Arthur
- Westonia
- Wickepin
- Williams
- Wongan-Ballidu
- Wyalkatchem
- Yilgarn
- York
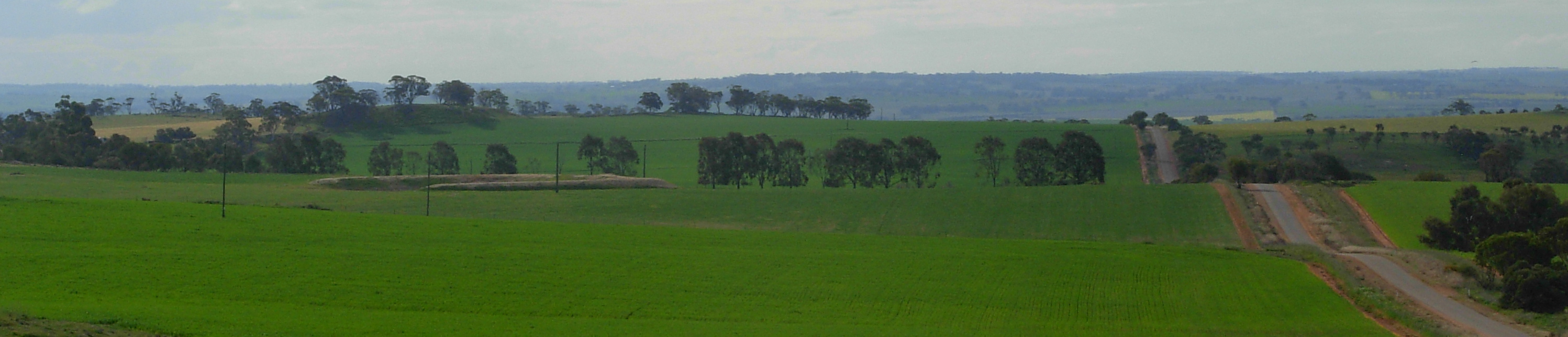
Wheat growing north-east of Northam

== Sub-regions within the Wheatbelt ==
There are numerous subdivisions of the Wheatbelt, and in most cases the separation is by local government areas.

=== Wheatbelt Development Commission ===
The Wheatbelt Development Commission (WDC) breaks the region up into five sub-regions with four offices:

==== Avon ====
- Shire of Beverley
- Shire of Cunderdin
- Shire of Dowerin
- Shire of Goomalling
- Shire of Koorda
- Shire of Northam – WDC office in Northam
- Shire of Quairading
- Shire of Tammin
- Shire of Toodyay
- Shire of Wyalkatchem
- Shire of York

==== Central Coast ====
- Shire of Chittering
- Shire of Dandaragan
- Shire of Gingin

==== Central Midlands ====
- Shire of Dalwallinu
- Shire of Moora – WDC office in Moora
- Shire of Victoria Plains
- Shire of Wongan-Ballidu

==== Central East ====
- Shire of Bruce Rock
- Shire of Kellerberrin
- Shire of Merredin – WDC office in Merredin
- Shire of Mount Marshall
- Shire of Mukinbudin
- Shire of Narembeen
- Shire of Nungarin
- Shire of Trayning
- Shire of Westonia
- Shire of Yilgarn

==== Wheatbelt South ====
- Shire of Brookton
- Shire of Corrigin
- Shire of Cuballing
- Shire of Dumbleyung
- Shire of Kondinin
- Shire of Kulin
- Shire of Lake Grace
- Shire of Narrogin – WDC office in Narrogin
- Shire of Pingelly
- Shire of Wagin
- Shire of Wandering
- Shire of West Arthur
- Shire of Wickepin
- Shire of Williams

=== Tourism regions ===
Most of the Wheatbelt is included in the larger Australia's Golden Outback.

Due to their proximity to Perth, however, the following shires are instead promoted as part of the Destination Perth region. The tourist precincts are included:

- Avon Valley
  - Beverley
  - Brookton
  - Goomalling
  - Northam
  - Toodyay
  - Victoria Plains
  - York
- Peel and Rockingham
  - Wandering
- Sunset Coast
  - Gingin
- Swan Valley
  - Chittering

Finally, the northwestern Shire of Dandaragan is promoted as part of Australia's Coral Coast region due to the presence of the larger seaside towns of Cervantes and Jurien Bay, which developed independently of wheat-growing.

=== Other regional designations ===
The Wheatbelt is separated into other designations at various times as well:

- Wheatbelt North East
- Wheatbelt Central
- The Open Wheatbelt

== See also ==
- Wheatbelt (Australia)
