= Wialki, Western Australia =

Wialki
- Town
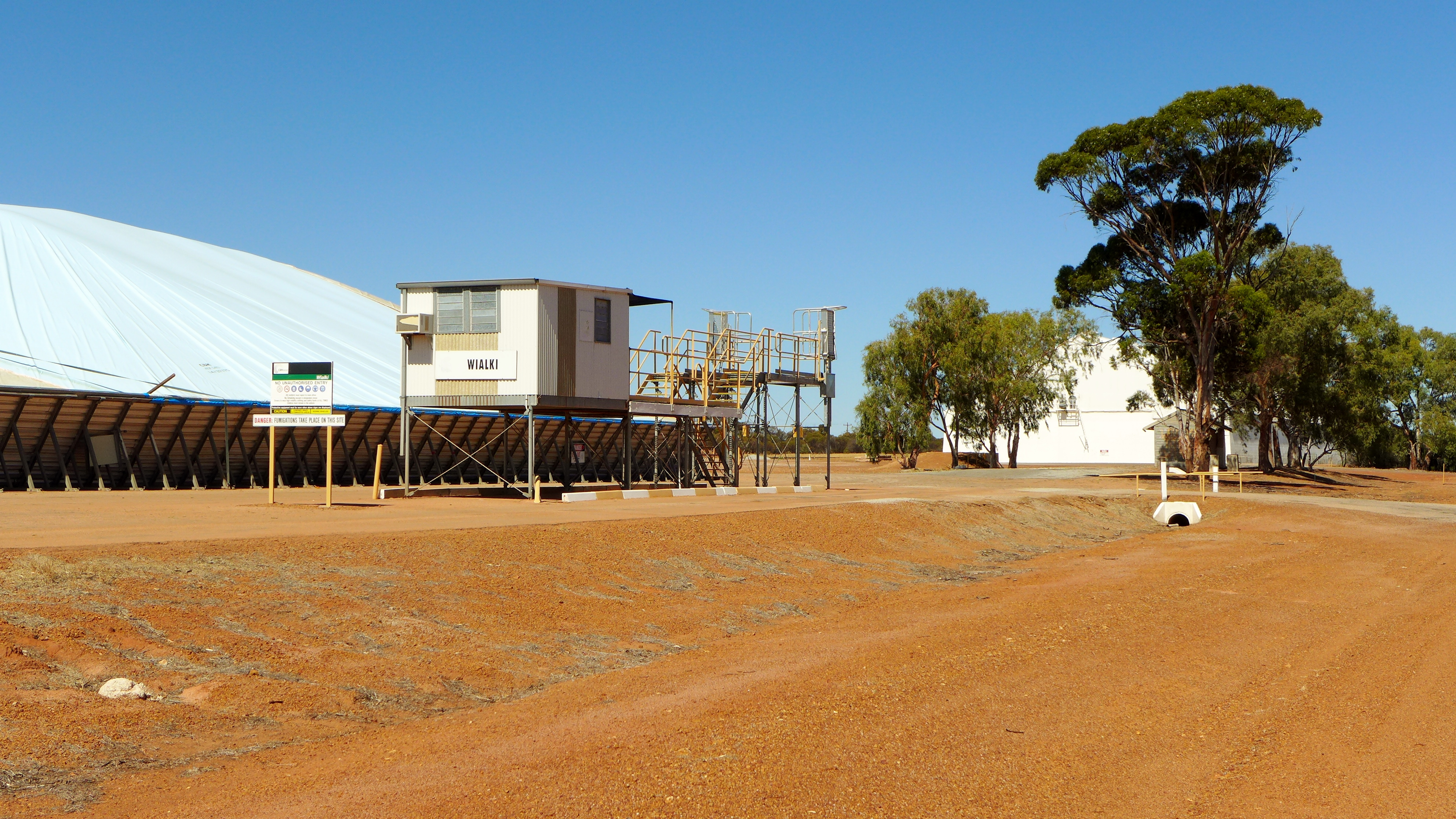
- Wialki grain receival point, 2014

- Coordinates: 30°28′35″S 118°07′18″E
- Country: Australia
- State: Western Australia
- LGA(s): Shire of Mount Marshall; Shire of Mukinbudin
- Location: 341 km (212 mi) north east of Perth; 25 km (16 mi) east of Beacon
- Established: 1933

Government
  - State electorate(s): Central Wheatbelt
  - Federal division(s): Durack

Area
  - Total: 889.1 km^{2} (343.3 sq mi)
- Elevation: 414 m (1,358 ft)

Population
  - Total(s): 45 (SAL 2021)
- Postcode: 6473

Wialki is a townsite in the eastern Wheatbelt region of Western Australia. It is situated between Beacon and Bonnie Rock, in the shires of Mount Marshall and Mukinbudin.

Wialki was originally a siding on the Burakin to Bonnie Rock railway extension planned to pass through the area in 1929; the district surveyor suggested the station should be named Datjoin but the Railway department chose the name Wialki after the Aboriginal name of a nearby soak. The station was named in 1930 and the townsite was gazetted in 1933. The surrounding areas produce wheat and other cereal crops. A second bulk wheat bin was constructed in town in 1940 just as the first bulk bin was filled. The town is a receival site for Cooperative Bulk Handling.
