= Acacia hopperiana =

Scientific classification
- Kingdom: Plantae
- Clade: Tracheophytes
- Clade: Angiosperms
- Clade: Eudicots
- Clade: Rosids
- Order: Fabales
- Family: Fabaceae
- Subfamily: Caesalpinioideae
- Clade: Mimosoid clade
- Genus: Acacia
- Species: A. hopperiana

Binomial name
- Acacia hopperiana Maslin
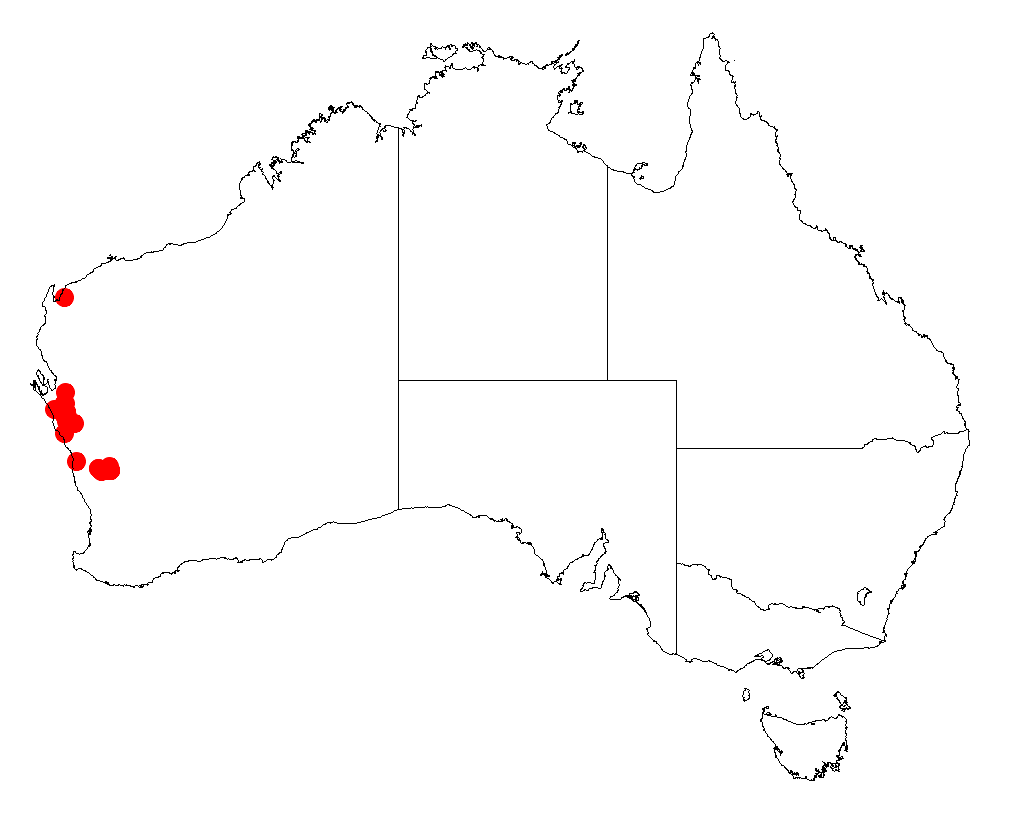
- Occurrence data from AVH

Synonyms
- Racosperma hopperianum (Maslin) Pedley

Species of legume

Acacia hopperiana is a species of flowering plant in the family Fabaceae and is endemic to the far west of Western Australia. It is a dense shrub or small tree with ascending to erect terete phyllodes, spikes of golden yellow flowers and flat, thinly leathery to firmly papery pods.

== Description ==
Acacia hopperiana is a dense, domed or inverted conical shrub that typically grows to a height of up to 3 m (9.8 ft) and 4 m (13 ft) wide, sometimes a tree to 4 m (13 ft), with silky hairy, ribbed, red-brown branchlets. Its phyllodes are ascending to erect, slightly rigid 60–140 mm (2.4–5.5 in) long, 0.7–1.0 mm (0.028–0.039 in) wide, straight to slightly curved, with ten longitudinal veins and sometimes with a sharply pointed tip. The flowers are golden yellow and borne in spikes 10–20 mm (0.39–0.79 in) long on a peduncle 1–2 mm (0.039–0.079 in) long. Flowering occurs in August, and the pods are flat, thinly leathery to firmly papery, 50–90 mm (2.0–3.5 in) long, 2–3 mm (0.079–0.118 in) wide and moderately to deeply constricted between the seeds. The seeds are oblong to disc-shaped, 2–3 mm (0.079–0.118 in) long and 1.5–2.0 mm (0.059–0.079 in) wide, glossy, sometimes mottled with a conical white aril.

It is closely related to Acacia isoneura.

== Taxonomy ==
Acacia hopperiana was first formally described in 1999 by Bruce Maslin from specimens he collected 44 km (27 mi) north of the Murchison River near the North West Coastal Highway in 1974. The specific epithet (hopperiana) honours Stephen Hopper.

== Distribution and habitat ==
This species of wattle grows on sandplains and dense shrubland in sandy or gritty loam soils. It is found between Carnamah and Watheroo, at Buntine Rock (about 20 km (12 mi) north of Wubin), and north of Geraldton in the Avon Wheatbelt, Carnarvon, Geraldton Sandplains and Yalgoo bioregions of far western Western Australia.

== Conservation status ==
Acacia hopperiana is listed as "not threatened" by the Western Australian Government Department of Biodiversity, Conservation and Attractions.

== See also ==
- List of Acacia species
