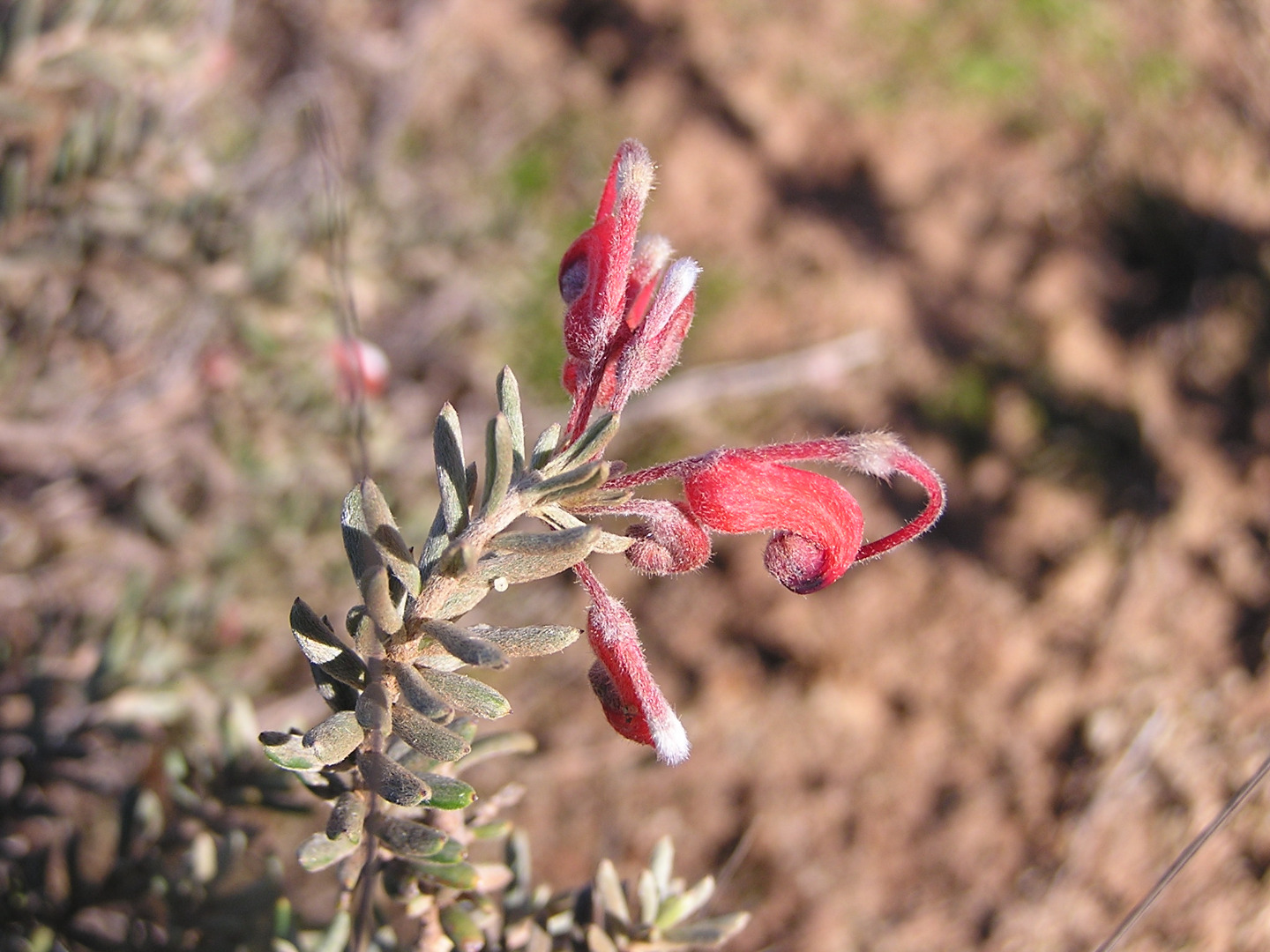

Conservation status
- Endangered (EPBC Act)

Scientific classification
- Kingdom: Plantae
- Clade: Tracheophytes
- Clade: Angiosperms
- Clade: Eudicots
- Order: Proteales
- Family: Proteaceae
- Genus: Grevillea
- Species: G. pythara

Binomial name
- Grevillea pythara Olde & Marriott

= Grevillea pythara =

Species of shrub endemic to Western Australia

Grevillea pythara, commonly known as Pythara grevillea, is a species of flowering plant in the family Proteaceae and is endemic to a restricted part of the South West region of Western Australia. It is a low, suckering shrub with linear to narrowly elliptic leaves and small groups of red flowers.

== Description ==
Grevillea pythara is a suckering shrub that typically grows to a height of 6–30 cm (2.4–11.8 in) and has shaggy-hairs branchlets. Its leaves are crowded, linear to narrowly elliptic, 7–16 mm (0.28–0.63 in) long and 1.5–4 mm (0.059–0.157 in) wide with the edges turned down or rolled under, sometimes concealing the lower surface. Both surfaces of the leaves are covered with shaggy hairs pressed against the surface. The flowers are arranged on the ends of branches in erect groups of 4 to 8 on a shaggy-hairy rachis about 3 mm (0.12 in) long. The flowers are red with a blue to black border, the pistil 20–22 mm (0.79–0.87 in) long. Flowering mainly occurs from July to December.

== Taxonomy ==
Grevillea pythara was first formally described in 1994 by Peter Olde and Neil Marriott in the journal Nuytsia from specimens collected by Olde near Pithara in 1992. The species was discovered by Jan Wellburn, who requested that the specific epithet be named after her father's farm "Pythara", where the species grows near one of its boundaries.

== Distribution and habitat ==
Pythara grevillea is only known from one population in three groups along less than 1 km (0.62 mi) of road verge. Fewer than 300 plants are known near Dalwallinu growing in weedy remnant vegetation on a disturbed road reserve.

== Conservation status ==
Grevillea pythara is listed as "endangered" under the Australian Government Environment Protection and Biodiversity Conservation Act 1999 and as "Threatened" by the Western Australian Government Department of Biodiversity, Conservation and Attractions, meaning that it is in danger of extinction. The threats to the species include its small population size, severe weed infestation, trampling by stock and road maintenance.

== See also ==
- List of Grevillea species
