= Hibbertia lividula =

Scientific classification
- Kingdom: Plantae
- Clade: Tracheophytes
- Clade: Angiosperms
- Clade: Eudicots
- Order: Dilleniales
- Family: Dilleniaceae
- Genus: Hibbertia
- Species: H. lividula

Binomial name
- Hibbertia lividula J.R.Wheeler

Species of flowering plant

Hibbertia lividula is a species of flowering plant in the family Dilleniaceae and is endemic to the south-west of Western Australia. It is an erect or sprawling shrub with thin branchlets, bluish-grey, narrow elliptic to narrow oblong leaves and yellow flowers, with thirty to forty stamens arranged around the five glabrous carpels.

== Description ==
Hibbertia lividula is an erect or sprawling shrub that typically grows to a height of up to 60 cm (24 in), the young branchlets thin and hairy. The leaves are bluish-grey, narrow elliptic, narrow oblong or narrow egg-shaped with the narrower end towards the base, 7–15 mm (0.28–0.59 in) long and 1.5–3.5 mm (0.059–0.138 in) wide. The flowers are arranged singly on the ends of branchlets and short side shoots and are 12–25 mm (0.47–0.98 in) wide and sessile. There are dark brown, overlapping bracts 1.5–3 mm (0.059–0.118 in) long at the base of the flower. The five sepals are 5–9 mm (0.20–0.35 in) long and the five petals are yellow, egg-shaped with the narrower end towards the base and 6–15 mm (0.24–0.59 in) long with a notch at the tip. There are thirty to forty stamens arranged around the five glabrous carpels that each contain two or three ovules. Flowering occurs from May to September.

== Taxonomy ==
Hibbertia lividula was first formally described in 1994 Judith R. Wheeler in the journal Nuytsia from specimens she collected near Beacon in 1989. The specific epithet (lividula) refer to the bluish-grey leaves.

== Distribution and habitat ==
This hibbertia grows in woodland and mallee woodland between Watheroo and Wialki in the Avon Wheatbelt and Geraldton Sandplains biogeographic regions of south-western Western Australia.

== Conservation status ==
Hibbertia lividula is classified as "not threatened" by the Western Australian Government Department of Parks and Wildlife.

== See also ==
- List of Hibbertia species
