= Eucalyptus wubinensis =

Conservation status
- Endangered (IUCN 3.1)

Scientific classification
- Kingdom: Plantae
- Clade: Tracheophytes
- Clade: Angiosperms
- Clade: Eudicots
- Clade: Rosids
- Order: Myrtales
- Family: Myrtaceae
- Genus: Eucalyptus
- Species: E. wubinensis

Binomial name
- Eucalyptus wubinensis L.A.S.Johnson & K.D.Hill

Species of eucalyptus

Bark

Fruit

Eucalyptus wubinensis, also known as Wubin mallee, is a species of mallee that is endemic to Western Australia. It has smooth grey bark, lance-shaped adult leaves, flower buds in groups of seven and cup-shaped, barrel-shaped or cylindrical fruit.

== Description ==
Eucalyptus wubinensis is a mallee that typically grows to a height of 8 m (26 ft) and forms a lignotuber. It has smooth white or greyish bark with bronze or brown streaks and is shed in long ribbons. Young plants have glaucous, egg-shaped to round leaves that are up to 70 mm (2.8 in) long and 45 mm (1.8 in) wide. Adult leaves are the same shade of green on both sides, narrow lance-shaped to lance-shaped, 70–100 mm (2.8–3.9 in) long and 8–14 mm (0.31–0.55 in) wide, tapering to a petiole 10–22 mm (0.39–0.87 in) long. The flower buds are arranged in leaf axils in groups of seven, sometimes nine, on an unbranched peduncle 4–15 mm (0.16–0.59 in) long, the individual buds on pedicels 2–5 mm (0.079–0.197 in) long. Mature buds are oval, 7–9 mm (0.28–0.35 in) long and 4–5 mm (0.16–0.20 in) wide with a rounded operculum. Flowering has been recorded in March and the fruit is a woody cup-shaped, barrel-shaped or cylindrical capsule 5–8 mm (0.20–0.31 in) long and 5–7 mm (0.20–0.28 in) wide with the valves near rim level.

== Taxonomy and naming ==
Eucalyptus wubinensis was first formally described in 2001 by Lawrie Johnson and Ken Hill from specimens collected near Wubin in 1983. The specific epithet is a reference to its occurrence in the Wubin district.

== Distribution and habitat ==
This mallee grows in mallee shrubland on sandplains from east of Wubin to Ballidu and east to Kulja.

== See also ==
- List of Eucalyptus species
