= Hakea rigida =

Conservation status
- Priority Two — Poorly Known Taxa (DEC)

Scientific classification
- Kingdom: Plantae
- Clade: Tracheophytes
- Clade: Angiosperms
- Clade: Eudicots
- Order: Proteales
- Family: Proteaceae
- Genus: Hakea
- Species: H. rigida

Binomial name
- Hakea rigida Haegi
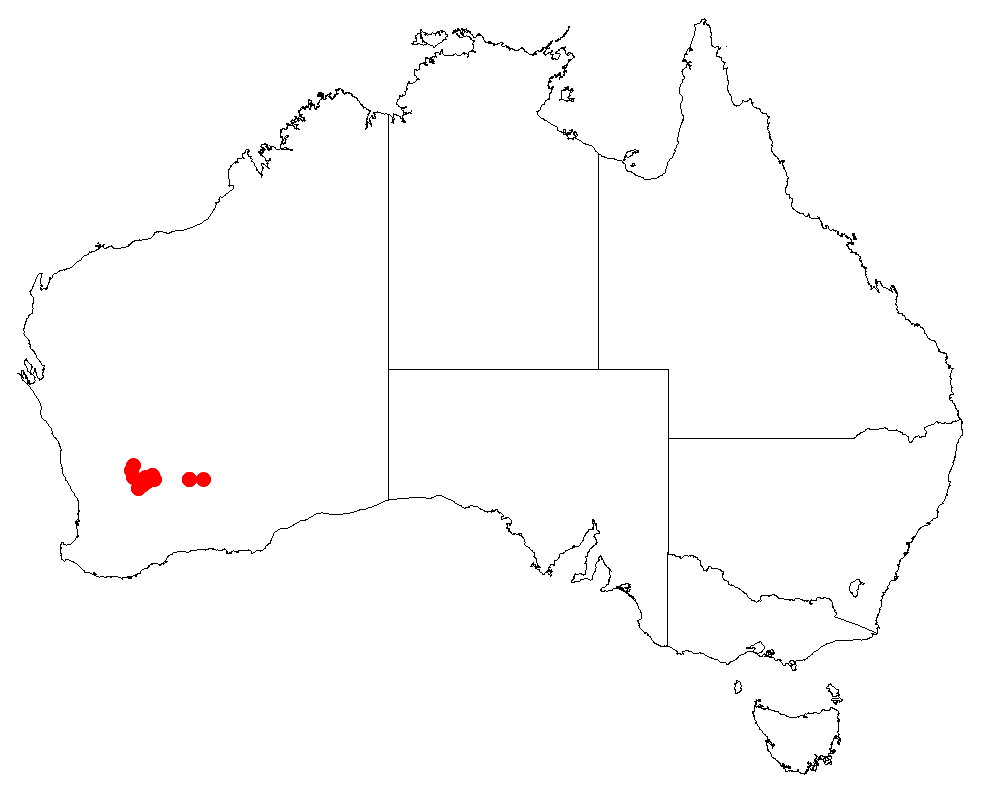
- Occurrence data from Australasian Virtual Herbarium

Species of shrub endemic to Western Australia

Hakea rigida is a flowering plant in the family Proteaceae with a restricted distribution and endemic to the western Goldfields region of Western Australia. It is a dense shrub with grey bark and sprays of pink flowers in spring.

== Description ==
Hakea rigida is a dense, erect to spreading shrub 0.6–2.7 m (2–9 ft) high and wide. The small branches are densely matted with silky hairs at flowering. The dark green leaves are variable, they may be needle-like 3.5–14 cm (1–6 in) long, 1–2 mm (0.04–0.08 in) in diameter, stiff, slightly curved, and ending in a sharp point. The leaves have 5-9 longitudinal veins, sparsely covered in silky hairs and often twisted where they join the branch. The flat leaves are thick and concave with 5 prominent longitudinal veins. The dark or pale pink racemes of 18–20 scented flowers are borne in leaf axils on smooth short pink stalks. The perianth is bright pink and the pistil 6.5–8 mm (0.3–0.3 in) long. Flowering occurs from September to October and the fruit are either oblong or egg-shaped about 2 cm (0.8 in) long and 1.5 cm (0.6 in) wide and form in small clusters. The surface is mostly smooth with occasional small blister-like protuberances, ending with a small thin beak.

== Taxonomy and naming ==
Hakea rigida was first formally described in 1999 by Laurence Haegi and the description was published in Flora of Australia. Haegi kept the name that Charles Austin Gardner had used to label specimens stored in the Western Australian Herbarium. The specific epithet (rigidus) is believed to be from the Latin rigidus meaning "rigid" referring to the leaves.

== Distribution and habitat ==
Hakea rigida is an uncommon species growing from Beacon, Bonnie Rock, Westonia the Yilgarn north of Southern Cross. Recorded only from a few specimens, occurring in mallee-shrubland, open sand plains to gravelly soils.

== Conservation status ==
Hakea rigida is classified as "Priority Two" by the Government of Western Australia Department of Parks and Wildlife, meaning that it is rare or threatened due to it being known from one to five populations.
