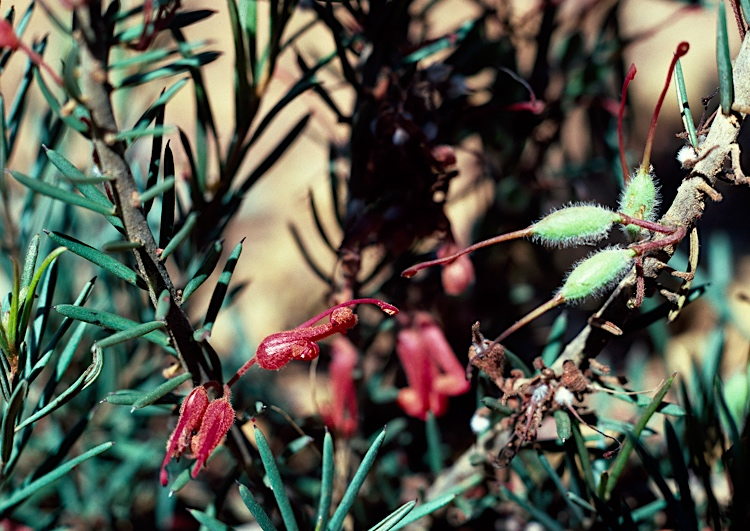

Conservation status
- Priority Two — Poorly Known Taxa (DEC)

Scientific classification
- Kingdom: Plantae
- Clade: Tracheophytes
- Clade: Angiosperms
- Clade: Eudicots
- Order: Proteales
- Family: Proteaceae
- Genus: Grevillea
- Species: G. rosieri

Binomial name
- Grevillea rosieri McGill.

= Grevillea rosieri =

Species of shrub endemic to Western Australia

Grevillea rosieri is a species of flowering plant in the family Proteaceae and is endemic to the south-west of Western Australia. It is a low spreading to erect shrub with linear leaves, the edges rolled under, and small groups of red to rusty red flowers, the style sometimes cream-coloured.

== Description ==
Grevillea rosieri is a spreading to erect shrub that typically grows to a height of up to 50 cm (20 in). Its leaves are linear, 10–40 mm (0.39–1.57 in) long and 0.8–1.5 mm (0.031–0.059 in) wide with the edges rolled under, concealing the lower surface. The flowers are arranged singly in leaf axils, or in groups of up to 3, on a woolly-hairy rachis 0.2–0.5 mm (0.0079–0.0197 in) long. The flowers are red to rusty red, the style occasionally cream-coloured with a red tip, the pistil 17.5–19 mm (0.69–0.75 in) long. Flowering occurs from July to September, and the fruit is a hairy, elliptic follicle 6–10 mm (0.24–0.39 in) long.

== Taxonomy ==
Grevillea rosieri was first formally described in 1986 by Donald McGillivray in his book "New Names in Grevillea (Proteaceae)" from specimens collected in 1951. The specific epithet (rosier) honours S.B. Rosier, an Anglican minister who discovered the species.

== Distribution and habitat ==
This grevillea grows in shrubland from near Wubin to near Kirwan Nature Reserve (near Burakin) in the Avon Wheatbelt, Swan Coastal Plain and Yalgoo bioregions of south-western Western Australia.

== Conservation status ==
Grevillea rosieri is listed as "Priority Two" by the Western Australian Government Department of Biodiversity, Conservation and Attractions, meaning that it is poorly known and from only one or a few locations.

== See also ==
- List of Grevillea species
