= Kulja, Western Australia =

Town in the Wheatbelt region of Western Australia

Kulja
- Town
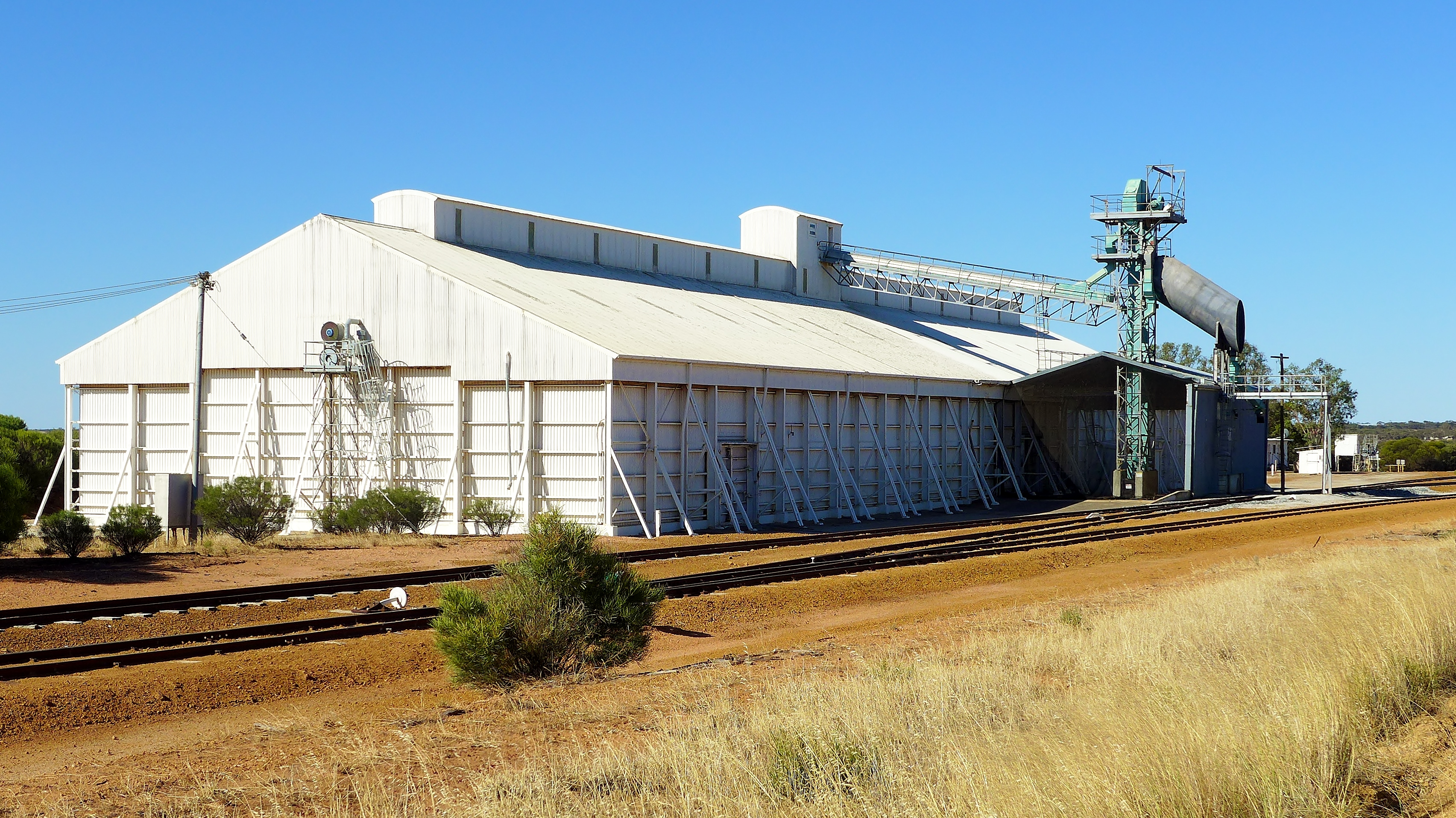
- Kulja grain receival point, 2014

- Coordinates: 30°30′S 117°19′E
- Country: Australia
- State: Western Australia
- LGA(s): Shire of Koorda
- Location: 253 km (157 mi) north east of Perth; 43 km (27 mi) north north west of Koorda; 64 km (40 mi) east of Dalwallinu
- Established: 1928

Government
  - State electorate(s): Central Wheatbelt
  - Federal division(s): Durack

Area
  - Total: 526.7 km^{2} (203.4 sq mi)
- Elevation: 321 m (1,053 ft)

Population
  - Total(s): 20 (SAL 2021)
- Postcode: 6470

Kulja is a small town in the Wheatbelt region of Western Australia. The town is situated along the Bonnie Rock to Burakin Road.

The area was charted in 1908 and the Indigenous Australian name of a local soak was recorded as Kulja. The townsite was originally established in the late 1920s as part of a railway siding on the Ejanding Northwards railway. The townsite was gazetted in 1928 once a large enough local population had settled in the area.

The surrounding areas produce wheat and other cereal crops. The town is a receiving site for Cooperative Bulk Handling.

== History ==
Kulja had a post office between 1928 and 1973. There was also a Kulja Railway Construction post office between 1929 and 1931.

In 1932 the Wheat Pool of Western Australia announced that the town would have two grain elevators, each fitted with an engine, installed at the railway siding.
