= Hibbertia arcuata =

Scientific classification
- Kingdom: Plantae
- Clade: Tracheophytes
- Clade: Angiosperms
- Clade: Eudicots
- Order: Dilleniales
- Family: Dilleniaceae
- Genus: Hibbertia
- Species: H. arcuata

Binomial name
- Hibbertia arcuata J.R.Wheeler

Species of flowering plant

Flower detail

Habit in a nature reserve, south-east of Latham

Hibbertia arcuata is a species of flowering plant in the family Dilleniaceae and is endemic to Western Australia. It is an erect shrub with spirally arranged, narrow oblong to narrow elliptic leaves and golden yellow flowers arranged singly in leaf axils with fifteen to twenty-eight stamens arranged around the two carpels.

== Description ==
Hibbertia arcuata is an erect shrub that typically grows to a height of up to 0.3–1.3 m (1 ft 0 in – 4 ft 3 in) with the foliage covered with short, star-shaped hairs. The leaves are spirally arranged, curved, narrow oblong to narrow elliptic, 4–8 mm (0.16–0.31 in) long and 1–1.5 mm (0.039–0.059 in) wide on a petiole 0.3–0.8 mm (0.012–0.031 in) long. The flowers are arranged singly in leaf axils, sessile on the ends of short side branchlets, 12–20 mm (0.47–0.79 in) wide with inconspicuous bracts 4–6 mm (0.16–0.24 in) long. The five sepals are elliptic, the outer sepals 5–8 mm (0.20–0.31 in) long and the inner sepals 6–9 mm (0.24–0.35 in) long. The five petals are golden yellow, 5–11 mm (0.20–0.43 in) long and egg-shaped with the narrower end towards the base. Fifteen to twenty-eight stamens are arranged around the two carpels that each contain six or eight ovules. Flowering occurs from July to October.

== Taxonomy ==
Hibbertia arcuata was first formally described in 1994 by Judith R. Wheeler in the journal Nuytsia from specimens she collected near Kalannie in 1988. The specific epithet (arcuata) means "curved like a bow", referring to the leaves.

== Distribution and habitat ==
This hibbertia grows in shrubland or woodland in the Avon Wheatbelt, and between Mullewa, Pindar, Paynes Find, Beacon and Wyalkatchem.

== See also ==
- List of Hibbertia species
