= Acacia deficiens =

Scientific classification
- Kingdom: Plantae
- Clade: Embryophytes
- Clade: Tracheophytes
- Clade: Angiosperms
- Clade: Eudicots
- Clade: Rosids
- Order: Fabales
- Family: Fabaceae
- Subfamily: Caesalpinioideae
- Clade: Mimosoid clade
- Genus: Acacia
- Species: A. deficiens

Binomial name
- Acacia deficiens Maslin
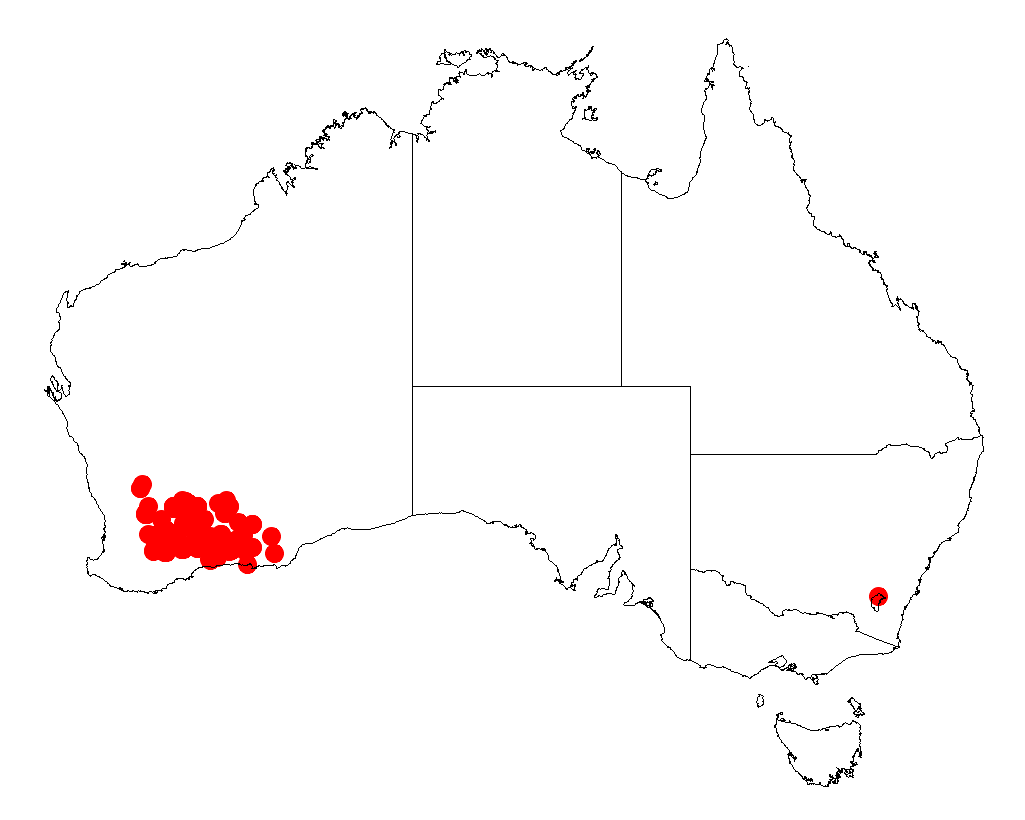
- Occurrence data from AVH

Synonyms
- Acacia nodiflora var. ferox E.Pritz.; Acacia nodiflora var. scoparia E.Pritz.; Racosperma deficiens (Maslin) Pedley

Species of legume

Acacia deficiens is a species of flowering plant in the family Fabaceae and is endemic to the south-west of Western Australia. It is a prostrate, domed or spreading shrub with a few mostly lance-shaped to narrowly oblong phyllodes at the base of the end branchlets, spherical heads of golden yellow flowers and narrowly oblong, brittle, glabrous, thinly papery pods.

== Description ==
Acacia deficiens is a prostrate, domed or spreading shrub that typically grows to a height of up to 1 m (3 ft 3 in), its branches dividing into many rigid, ascending to erect, more or less spiny, glabrous branchlets. There are only a few phyllodes at the base of the end branchlets and absent from the upper nodes. The phyllodes are lance-shaped to narrowly oblong, rarely linear, mostly 10–20 mm (0.39–0.79 in) long and 2–4 mm (0.079–0.157 in) wide and green to more or less glaucous and glabrous. The flowers are borne in a spherical heads in axils on a peduncle 4–9 mm (0.16–0.35 in) long, the heads 4–5 mm (0.16–0.20 in) in diameter with normally 20 to 30 golden yellow flowers. Flowering has been recorded from September to November, and the pods are mostly narrowly oblong, thinly papery and very brittle, up to 40 mm (1.6 in) long, 4–6 mm (0.16–0.24 in) wide and prominently rounded over the seeds. The seeds are egg-shaped to elliptic, 3–4 mm (0.12–0.16 in) long and black.

== Taxonomy ==
Acacia deficiens was first formally described in 1999 by Bruce Maslin from specimens he collected 36 km (22 mi) south of Queen Victoria Rock in Western Australia in 1983. The specific epithet (deficiens) means 'lacking', referring to the lack of phyllodes on flowering branchlets.

== Distribution and habitat ==
This species of wattle has a scattered distribution from Burakin south to near Lake Grace and east to near Mount Andrew (about 90 km (56 mi) south-west of Balladonia) and Coolgardie. It grows in loam, clay, sandy loam and sand, in open shrub mallee and woodland on flat or gently undulating plains in the Avon Wheatbelt, Coolgardie, Esperance Plains and Mallee bioregions of south-western Western Australia.

== Conservation status ==
Acacia deficiens is listed as "not threatened" by the Government of Western Australia Department of Biodiversity, Conservation and Attractions.

== See also ==
- List of Acacia species
