= Acacia stanleyi =

Stanley's rock wattle

Conservation status
- Priority One — Poorly Known Taxa (DEC)

Scientific classification
- Kingdom: Plantae
- Clade: Tracheophytes
- Clade: Angiosperms
- Clade: Eudicots
- Clade: Rosids
- Order: Fabales
- Family: Fabaceae
- Subfamily: Caesalpinioideae
- Clade: Mimosoid clade
- Genus: Acacia
- Species: A. stanleyi

Binomial name
- Acacia stanleyi Maslin

Species of legume

Acacia stanleyi, commonly known as Stanley's rock wattle, is a shrub belonging to the genus Acacia and the subgenus Juliflorae that is endemic to south western Australia.

== Description ==
The shrub typically grows to a height of 2 to 3.5 metres (7 to 11 ft) and has a bushy, rounded and obconic habit. It has sub-glabrous branchlets and phyllodes that run continuously along with the branchlets. The sub-rigid, ascending to erect evergreen phyllodes are 15 to 30 cm (5.9 to 11.8 in) in length and have a diameter of 1 to 1.5 mm (0.039 to 0.059 in). The phyllodes are generally shallowly incurved and green in colour but turn grey once they die, they have eight longitudinal nerves with deep grooves between the nerves. It blooms from August to September producing yellow flowers. The simple inflorescences are 25 to 35 mm (0.98 to 1.38 in) cylindrically shaped flower-spikes packed with golden coloured flowers. Following flowering thinly coriaceous and glabrous seed pods that resemble a string of beads form. The pods have a length of 5 to 16 cm (2.0 to 6.3 in) and a width of 3 to 5 mm (0.12 to 0.20 in) and have longitudinally arranged seeds inside. The slightly shiny black seeds have an elliptic to oblong-elliptic shape and a length of 3 to 4 mm (0.12 to 0.16 in) and a width of 2 to 2.5 mm (0.079 to 0.098 in) and a pitted surface with a white to pale cream coloured aril.

== Distribution ==
It is native to a small area in the Wheatbelt region of Western Australia. It has only a very limited distribution and is known from only two populations that are located to the north and north east of Kalannie where it is usually situated on and around granite outcrops growing in hard, gritty, sandy loam soils as a part of open woodland communities.

== See also ==
- List of Acacia species
