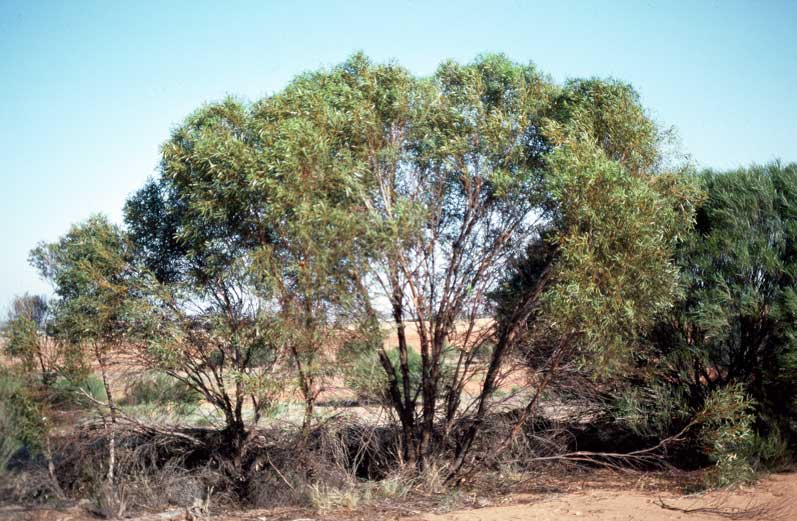
- Eucalyptus brevipes near Bonnie Rock

Conservation status
- Endangered (IUCN 3.1)

Scientific classification
- Kingdom: Plantae
- Clade: Embryophytes
- Clade: Tracheophytes
- Clade: Spermatophytes
- Clade: Angiosperms
- Clade: Eudicots
- Clade: Rosids
- Order: Myrtales
- Family: Myrtaceae
- Genus: Eucalyptus
- Species: E. brevipes

Binomial name
- Eucalyptus brevipes Brooker

= Eucalyptus brevipes =

Mukinbudin mallee

Species of eucalyptus

Eucalyptus brevipes, commonly known as the Mukinbudin mallee, is a mallee that is endemic to Western Australia. It has coarse, fibrous to flaky back on the trunk and larger branches, smooth grey to pinkish bark above. The adult leaves are linear to narrow lance-shaped, the flower buds are arranged in groups of seven, the flowers are white and the fruit is cylindrical or barrel-shaped.

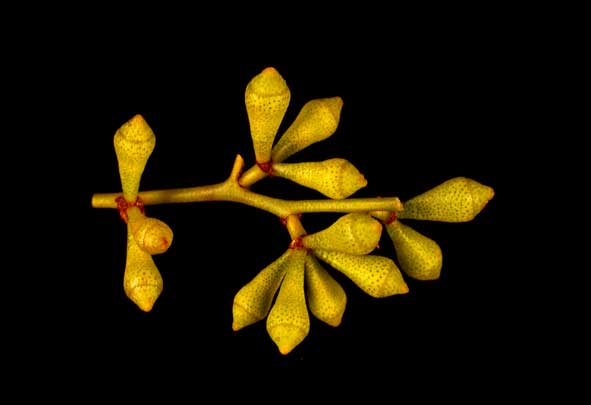
Flower buds

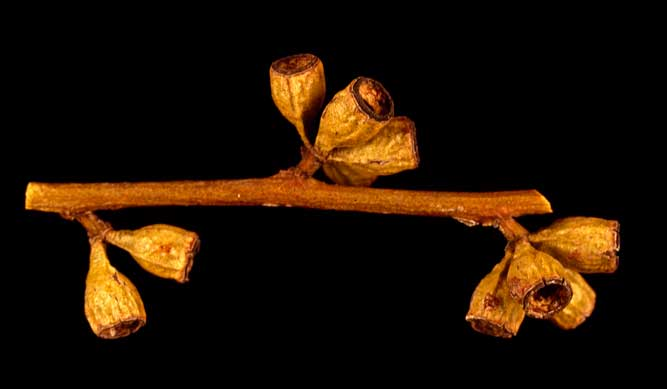
Fruit

== Description ==
Eucalyptus brevipes is a mallee that typically grows to a height of 3 to 5 metres (10 to 16 ft) and forms a lignotuber. The bark on the trunk and larger branches is fibrous to flaky but smooth grey to pinkish on branches less than 5 centimetres (2 in) in diameter. The leaves on young plants and on coppice regrowth are linear to narrow lance-shaped, 50–80 mm (2.0–3.1 in) long and 7–15 mm (0.28–0.59 in) wide. The adult leaves are held erect, linear to narrow lance-shaped, 70–125 mm (2.8–4.9 in) long and 7–10 mm (0.28–0.39 in) wide with a fine, often hooked tip. The glossiness of the leaves increases as the plant matures. The flower buds are arranged in groups of seven in leaf axils on a peduncle 2–6 mm (0.079–0.24 in) long, the individual flowers on a pedicel 2–4 mm (0.079–0.16 in) long. The mature flower buds are oval to pear-shaped, 7–8 mm (0.28–0.31 in) long and 3–5 mm (0.12–0.20 in) wide with a conical or slightly beaked operculum 2–3 mm (0.079–0.12 in) long. Flowering occurs from July to September and the flowers are white or creamy white. The fruit is a woody, barrel-shaped to cup-shaped capsule 6 to 7 mm (0.24 to 0.28 in) long and 4 to 7 mm (0.16 to 0.28 in) wide on a pedicel 1–4 mm (0.039–0.16 in) long. Eucalyptus brevipes is similar to E. gracilis but can be distinguished by its erect leaves.

== Taxonomy and naming ==
Eucalyptus brevipes was first formally described in 1986 by Ian Brooker and the description was published in the journal Nuytsia from a specimen he collected near Cunderin Hill, between Mukinbudin and Bonnie Rock. The specific epithet (brevipes) is from the Latin words brevis meaning "short" and pes meaning "foot", referring to the pedicels.

== Distribution and habitat ==
Mukinbudin mallee is found among granite outcrops in the Wheatbelt region of Western Australia between Mukinbudin and Nungarin where it grows on sandy-loamy soils. It is often found in open low scrub country along with Eucalyptus loxophleba, Eucalyptus kochii, and Acacia acuminata.

There are 14 known populations of this species that are known ten of which occur on unallocated crown land. There is an estimated 320 mature plants in nine of the populations occurring over an area of 1,780 square kilometres (687 sq mi). The main threats to the species are fire, road works, and firebreak maintenance. It is thought to be able to resprout from a lignotuber following a fire.

== Conservation ==
Eucalyptus brevipes is classified as "endangered by the Australian Government Environment Protection and Biodiversity Conservation Act 1999 and as "Threatened Flora (Declared Rare Flora — Extant)" by the Department of Environment and Conservation (Western Australia). The main threats to the species are fire, road works and firebreak maintenance.

== See also ==
- List of Eucalyptus species
