= Kokardine, Western Australia =

Kokardine
- Town
- Interactive map of Kokardine
- Coordinates: 30.69°S 117.18°E
- Country: Australia
- State: Western Australia
- LGA: Shire of Wongan-Ballidu
- Location: 190 km (120 mi) NE of Perth; 33 km (21 mi) NW of Koorda

Government
  - State electorate: Moore
  - Federal division: Durack
- Elevation: 397 m (1,302 ft)

Kokardine is a locality in the Wheatbelt region of Western Australia, northwest of Koorda. It is located within the Shire of Wongan-Ballidu.

The name Kokardine, which may mean "water in the grass", is derived from the Aboriginal name of a nearby soak, first recorded by a surveyor in 1892.

== History ==
In 1927, with the Ejanding Northward railway under construction between the towns now known as Amery and Kalannie, the Wongan Hills road board asked that a townsite be set aside at the siding and place later named Kokardine. The townsite was gazetted in 1929.

== See also ==
- CBH class – a class of locomotive, one of which is named after the locality
