= Pimelea brevifolia =

Scientific classification
- Kingdom: Plantae
- Clade: Tracheophytes
- Clade: Angiosperms
- Clade: Eudicots
- Clade: Rosids
- Order: Malvales
- Family: Thymelaeaceae
- Genus: Pimelea
- Species: P. brevifolia

Binomial name
- Pimelea brevifolia R.Br.

Synonyms
- Banksia brevifolia (R.Br.) Kuntze; Calyptrostegia brevifolia (R.Br.) C.A.Mey.

Species of shrub

Pimelea brevifolia is a species of flowering plant in the family Thymelaeaceae and is endemic to the south-west of Western Australia. It is an undershrub or shrub with erect, elliptic leaves, and heads of white flowers surrounded by four involucral bracts.

== Description ==
Pimelea brevifolia is an undershrub or shrub that typically grows to a height of 0.1–1 m (3.9 in – 3 ft 3.4 in). The leaves are erect, elliptic, 1–16 mm (0.039–0.630 in) long and 0.5–6 mm (0.020–0.236 in) wide and sessile or on a petiole up to 0.3 mm (0.012 in) long. The flowers are borne in heads on a peduncle mostly 5–20 mm (0.20–0.79 in) long and surrounded by four egg-shaped to broadly elliptic involucral bracts 4–12 mm (0.16–0.47 in) long and 3–9 mm (0.12–0.35 in) wide. The flowers are bisexual or female, usually white and glabrous inside, the floral tube 6–12 mm (0.24–0.47 in) long. The sepals are egg-shaped, 2–4 mm (0.079–0.157 in) long, the stamens shorter than the sepals and the style usually protrudes by up to 2 mm (0.079 in) long. Flowering occurs from July to October.

== Taxonomy and naming ==
Pimelea brevifolia was first formally described in 1810 by Robert Brown in his book Prodromus Florae Novae Hollandiae et Insulae Van Diemen. The specific epithet (brevifolia) is derived from the Latin words brevis meaning "short" and folium meaning "leaf".

In 1988, Barbara Lynette Rye described two subspecies of P. brevifolia in the journal Nuytsia, and the names are accepted by the Australian Plant Census:

- Pimelea brevifolia R.Br. subsp. brevifolia has egg-shaped involucral bracts and long hairs on the ovary part of the floral tube.
- Pimelea brevifolia subsp. modesta (Meisn.) Rye, previously known as Pimelea modesta Meisn. has elliptic involucral bracts short hairs on the ovary part of the floral tube.

== Distribution and habitat ==
Subspecies brevifolia grows in shrubland in sandy soil between Lake Grace, Albany and Israelite Bay in the Coolgardie, Esperance Plains, Jarrah Forest and Mallee bioregions, and subspecies modesta grows in sand between Wubin, Lake Grace, Coolgardie and Norseman in the Avon Wheatbelt, Coolgardie, and Mallee bioregions of south-western Western Australia.

== Conservation status ==
Both subspecies of Pimelea brevifolia are listed as "not threatened" by the Government of Western Australia Department of Biodiversity, Conservation and Attractions.
