= Kalannie railway line =

Railway line in Western Australia

Amery to Kalannie railway line
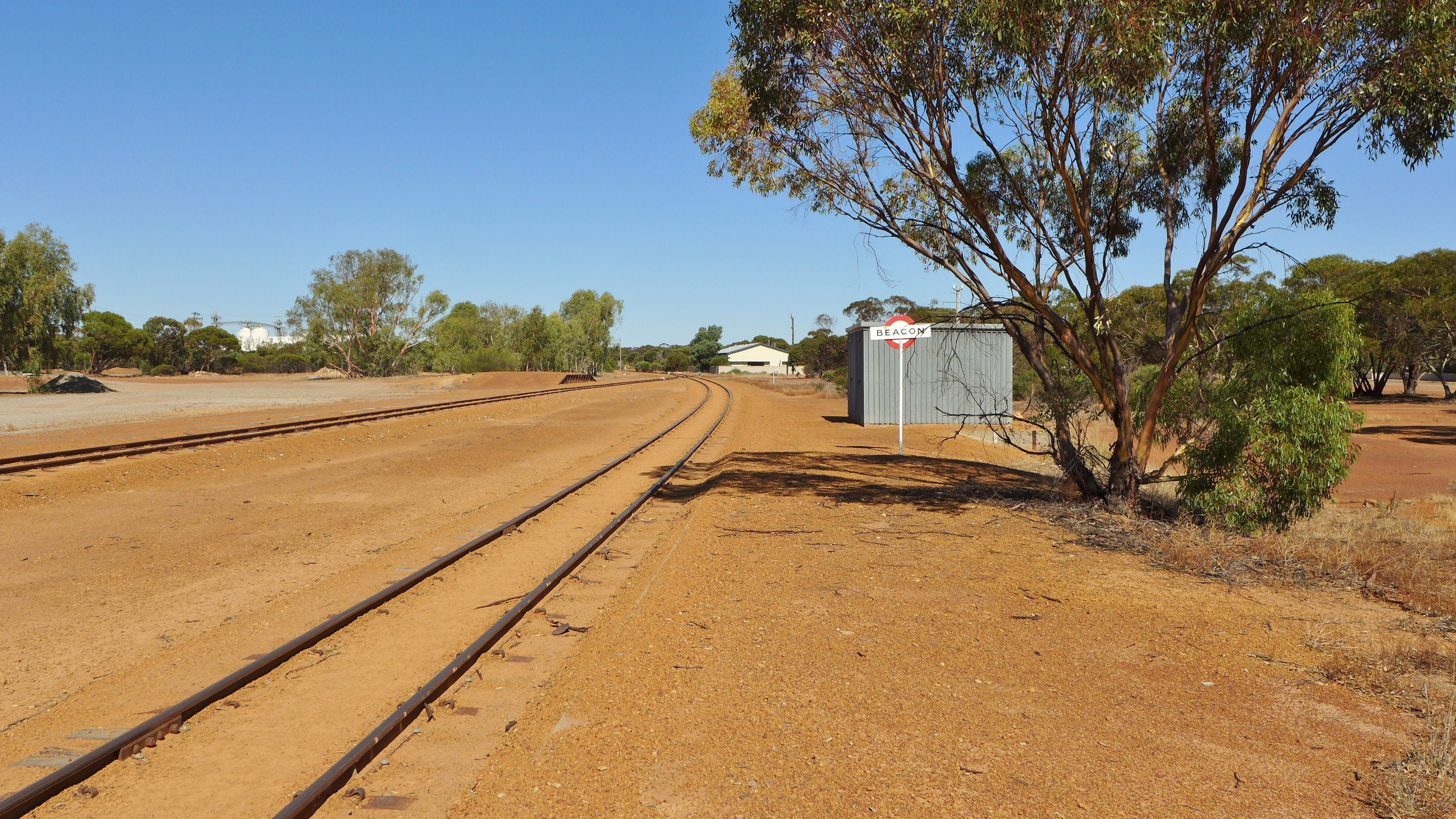
- The railway line at Beacon in 2014

Overview
- Owner: Public Transport Authority
- Locale: Wheatbelt, Western Australia
- Termini: Amery; Kalannie Bonnie Rock (spur)

Service
- Operator(s): Arc Infrastructure

History
- Commenced: 1927
- Opened: 15 April 1929

Technical
- Line length: 98 km (61 mi)
- Track gauge: 1,067 mm (3 ft 6 in)
- Highest elevation: 405.5 m (1,330 ft)
- Amery to Kalannie & Burakin to Bonnie Rock railway lines Main locations

The Amery to Kalannie railway line is a 98-kilometre (61 mi) long railway line operated by Arc Infrastructure in the Wheatbelt region of Western Australia, connecting Amery with Kalannie.

At Amery, the railway line connects to the Goomalling to West Merredin railway line while, at Burakin, the Burakin to Bonnie Rock railway line branches off, which now only operates as far as Beacon. Both the Amery to Kalannie and Burakin to Bonnie Rock lines are spur lines, which terminate at Kalannie and Bonnie Rock without connecting to another railway line.

== History ==
The Dowerin–Merredin Railway Act 1909, an act by the Parliament of Western Australia granted assent on 21 December 1909, authorised the construction of a railway line from Dowerin to Merredin, thereby extending the already existing Goomalling to Dowerin railway line. This railway line, passing through Amery, was officially opened as far as Korrelocking on 6 February 1911, with the full extension to Merredin opening on 28 August 1911. Until 1928, Amery was known as Ejanding, when it was renamed to Amery and a siding on the railway further north was named Ejanding.

The Ejanding Northwards Railway Act 1926 assented to on 16 December 1926, authorised the construction of the spur lines north of Amery, to be known as the Ejanding Northwards Railway with the contract for the construction awarded to Western Australian Public Works Department on 28 June 1927. The new railway line was to split at Burakin, heading north from there to Kalannie and east to Kulja, with both officially opening on 15 April 1929.

The Kulja Eastward Railway Act 1928, assented to on 20 October 1928, authorised the extension of the spur line from Kulja to Bonnie Rock. The contract for this extension was awarded to the Public Works Department on 15 April 1929 and the extension was opened on 27 April 1931.

In January 1933, it was proposed by the Railway Advisory Board to extend the railway line north from Kalannie to Xantippe. A number of proposals were made, one of them for a loop from Kalannie to Kulja. A 35-kilometre (22 mi) long railway straight north from Kalannie was the board's preferred option for the extension. At this point, approval of railway lines by the Parliament of Western Australia had dropped off and no act was passed to expand the Kalannie railway line.

By 1948, the Burakin to Bonnie Rock was rumored to be closed but this was denied by the state government. In October 1953, the state government proposed to close the line, citing its losses. While the government was accepting that the railway line could not be expected to achieve a profit it did expect it to cover 50 percent of its operating cost. However, at this point, the line cost £A 30,000 annually to operate but only earned less than £A 9,000. In November 1953, the decision was made to keep the Burakin to Bonnie Rock railway line open, as was the Wiluna to Meekatharra line, because the state government was concerned about the need for heavy road freight subsidies if these lines were to be closed. Instead, it planned to close the Bellevue–Mundaring–Mount Helena line, as it did not require such subsidies.

As of 2024, the railway line is operated by Arc Infrastructure. The 98-kilometre (61 mi) Amery to Kalannie line and 71-kilometre (44 mi) Burakin to Beacon lines are operational while the 51-kilometre (32 mi) section from Beacon to Bonnie Rock is not. Arc Infrastructure deems the railway lines to Kalannie and Beacon to be part of its Grain Freight Rail Network, which, in 2017, accounted for 50 percent of its network but only 10 percent of its freight. The line to Kalannie is classified as Tier 1 while the spur to Beacon is classified as Tier 2. The Beacon to Bonnie Rock section did not feature in this classification, being instead deemed an uneconomic line.

== Elevation ==
The main railway line starts at an elevation of 303.6 metres (996 ft) at Amery and finishes at Kalannie at an elevation of 328.8 metres (1,079 ft). It reaches its lowest point of 281.4 metres (923 ft) at 10.2 kilometres (6.3 mi) from Amery and its highest point of 405.5 metres (1,330 ft) at 54.7 kilometres (34.0 mi), between Cadoux and Kokardine.

The spur line starts at an elevation of 347.4 metres (1,140 ft) at Burakin and finishes at Beacon at an elevation of 373.1 metres (1,224 ft), with the extension to Bonnie Rock not assessed by Arc Infrastructure. It reaches its lowest point of 312.8 metres (1,026 ft) at 27.8 kilometres (17.3 mi) from Burakin and its highest point of 378.2 metres (1,241 ft) at 61 kilometres (38 mi).

== Heritage ==
The Cadoux railway siding is on the Shire of Wongan-Ballidu's heritage list, and consists of a loading ramp and crane.

In the Shire of Dalwallinu, the Kalannie railway station and the railway track are on the shire's heritage list.

On the spur line to Bonnie Rock, the railway barracks and station at Beacon are both on the Shire of Mount Marshall's heritage list.
