= Acacia synoria =

Goodlands wattle

Conservation status
- Priority Two — Poorly Known Taxa (DEC)

Scientific classification
- Kingdom: Plantae
- Clade: Tracheophytes
- Clade: Angiosperms
- Clade: Eudicots
- Clade: Rosids
- Order: Fabales
- Family: Fabaceae
- Subfamily: Caesalpinioideae
- Clade: Mimosoid clade
- Genus: Acacia
- Species: A. synoria

Binomial name
- Acacia synoria Maslin

Species of legume

Acacia synoria is a tree or shrub, also known as goodlands wattle, belonging to the genus Acacia and the subgenus Juliflorae that is endemic to a small area of western Australia.

== Description ==
The multi-stemmed tree or shrub typically grows to a height of 1.5 to 5 metres (5 to 16 ft) and has an obconic habit and has glabrous branchlets. Like most species of Acacia it has phyllodes rather than true leaves. The light green and terete phyllodes have with delicate brown points. The phyllodes grow to a length of 5 to 10.5 cm (2.0 to 4.1 in) and a width of 0.7 to 1 mm (0.028 to 0.039 in) and are not particularly rigid and usually shallowly incurved. The mostly glabrous phyllodes have eight longitudinal nerves each of which is separated by a distinct, longitudinal groove. It blooms in December producing yellow flowers.

== Distribution ==
It is native to an area in the Wheatbelt region of Western Australia between Yalgoo and Dalwallinu where it is often situated around granite outcrops, alongside creeklines and near gravel pits growing in sandy clay or sandy loam soils.

== See also ==
- List of Acacia species
