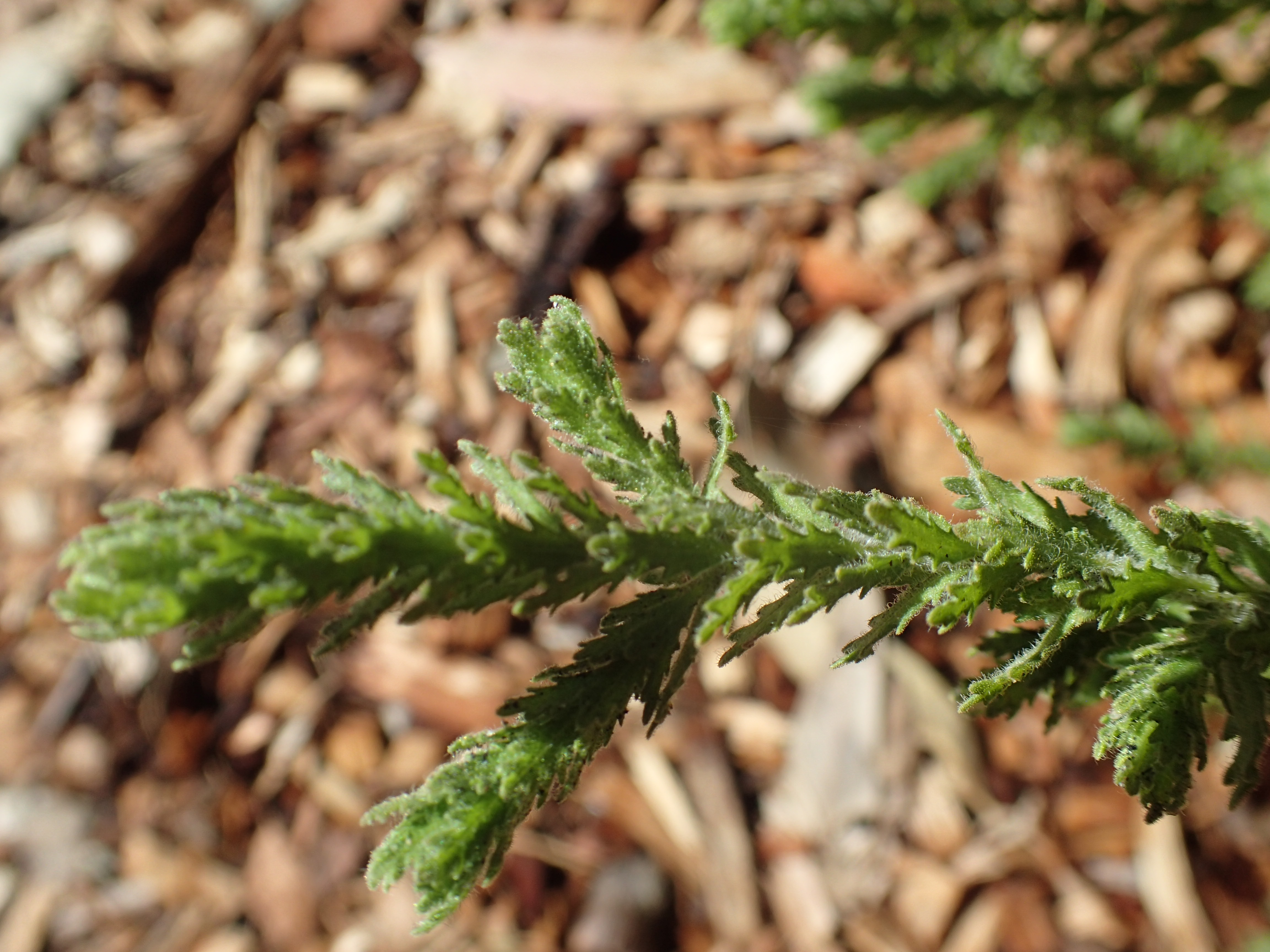
- Foliage of E. pinnatifida in Kings Park, Perth

Conservation status
- Declared rare (DEC)

Scientific classification
- Kingdom: Plantae
- Clade: Embryophytes
- Clade: Tracheophytes
- Clade: Spermatophytes
- Clade: Angiosperms
- Clade: Eudicots
- Clade: Asterids
- Order: Lamiales
- Family: Scrophulariaceae
- Genus: Eremophila
- Species: E. pinnatifida

Binomial name
- Eremophila pinnatifida Chinnock

= Eremophila pinnatifida =

Species of flowering plant

Eremophila pinnatifida, commonly known as Dalwallinu eremophila is a flowering plant in the figwort family, Scrophulariaceae and is endemic to Western Australia. It is a spreading, rounded shrub with aromatic, deeply divided leaves and pale purple flowers which are white with purple spots inside. It is a rare plant, known only from a few areas near Perth.

== Description ==
Eremophila pinnatifida is an erect, rounded, aromatic shrub which grows to a height of between 0.6 and 1.0 m (2 and 3 ft). Its branches are mostly hidden by the leaves and are densely hairy with both yellow glandular and simple hairs. The leaves are arranged in whorls of 3, overlap each other and are oblong to egg-shaped, deeply divided, 5–9.5 mm (0.2–0.4 in) long and 2.5–4.5 mm (0.1–0.2 in) wide. They are sticky due to the presence of resin, densely covered with glandular hairs on both surfaces and with longer white hairs mainly only on the upper surface.

The flowers are borne singly in leaf axils and lack a stalk. There are 5 green, linear to lance-shaped, hairy sepals which are 5–8 mm (0.2–0.3 in) long. The petals are 18–25 mm (0.7–1 in) long and are joined at their lower end to form a tube. The petal tube is pale to deep purple on the outside and white with pale purple spots inside. The outer surface of the tube and lobes is hairy but the inner surface of the petal lobes is glabrous and the inside of the tube is filled with long, soft hairs. The 4 stamens are fully enclosed in the petal tube. Flowering occurs from August to January and is followed by fruits which are dry, woody, oval-shaped with a pointed end and about 4 mm (0.2 in) long with a hairy covering.

== Taxonomy and naming ==
This species was first formally described by Robert Chinnock in 2007 and the description was published in Eremophila and Allied Genera: A Monograph of the Plant Family Myoporaceae. The specific epithet is from the "Latin pinnatifida, lobed in a pinnate manner, the lobes cut to about three-quarters of the way to the midrib".

== Distribution and habitat ==
Eremophila pinnatifida grows in loamy soil in tall, open Eucalyptus woodland between Dalwallinu and Wongan Hills in the Avon Wheatbelt biogeographic region.

== Conservation ==
E. pinnatifida is classified as "Threatened Flora (Declared Rare Flora — Extant)" by the Department of Environment and Conservation (Western Australia) and an Interim Recovery Plan has been prepared.

== Use in horticulture ==
This is a fast-growing shrub with attractive, fern-like leaves and massed flower displays in spring and early summer. It is widely grown in eastern Australia but is sometimes short-lived. It can be easily grown from cuttings and grows in most soils, including clay but prefers a sunny position. It is tolerant of long droughts and of frost.
