= Acacia isoneura =

Scientific classification
- Kingdom: Plantae
- Clade: Embryophytes
- Clade: Tracheophytes
- Clade: Spermatophytes
- Clade: Angiosperms
- Clade: Eudicots
- Clade: Rosids
- Order: Fabales
- Family: Fabaceae
- Subfamily: Caesalpinioideae
- Clade: Mimosoid clade
- Genus: Acacia
- Species: A. isoneura

Binomial name
- Acacia isoneura Maslin & A.R.Chapman
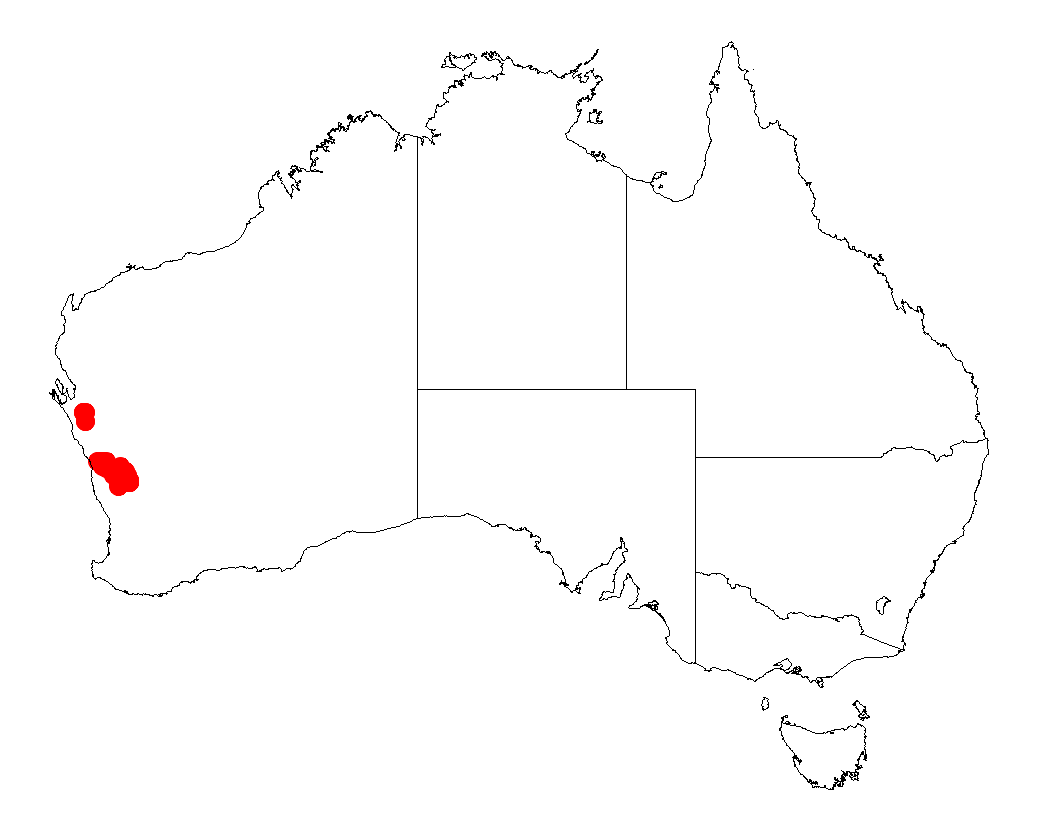
- Occurrence data from AVH

Synonyms
- Racosperma isoneurum (Maslin & A.R.Chapm.) Pedley

Species of legume

Acacia isoneura is a species of flowering plant in the family Fabaceae and is endemic to the south-west of Western Australia. It is a rounded or inverted cone-shaped shrub with terete, soft and flexible or rigid phyllodes depending on subspecies, oblong to short cylindrical heads of golden yellow flowers and firmly leathery pods.

== Description ==
Acacia isoneura is a rounded or inverted cone-shaped shrub that typically grows to a height of 0.5–4 m (2–13 ft) and has ribbed branchlets covered with silky hairs between the ribs. Its phyllodes are terete, pointed, soft and flexible or rigid depending on subspecies, 70–120 mm (2.8–4.7 in) long and 0.5–1.2 mm (0.020–0.047 in) in diameter with eight broad veins separated by a shallow, narrow furrow. The flowers are borne in oblong to short-cylindrical, more or less sessile heads 8–15 mm (0.31–0.59 in) long, each head with golden yellow flowers. Flowering occurs from July to September and the pods are linear to almost resembling a string of beads, firmly leathery, 30–60 mm (1.2–2.4 in) long, 2–3 mm (0.079–0.118 in) wide and covered with stiff hairs. The seeds are elliptic to oblong, 2–3 mm (0.079–0.118 in) long and glossy grey-brown, speckled dark or light brown and mottled yellow, with an aril on the end.

== Taxonomy ==
Acacia isoneura was first formally described in 1999 by Bruce Maslin and Alex Chapman in the journal Nuytsia from specimens collected by Maslin near Mingenew in 1970.

In the same journal, Maslin and Chapman described two subspecies of A. isoneura, and the names are accepted by the Australian Plant Census:

- Acacia isoneura Maslin & A.R.Chapman subsp. isoneura has soft, flexible phyllodes 0.5–0.6 mm (0.020–0.024 in) in diameter.
- Acacia isoneura subsp. nimiaMaslin & A.R.Chapman has thick, rigid phyllodes 0.8–1.2 mm (0.031–0.047 in) in diameter.

== Distribution ==
This species of wattle grows in flats, sandplains, low rises and ridges in stony sandy soils.

- Subspecies isoneura grows in the Mingenew-Three Springs area.
- Subspecies isoneura grows in the Wubin-Perenjori area in tall shrubland.

== Conservation status ==
Both subspecies of Acacia isoneura are listed as "Priority Three" by the Government of Western Australia Department of Parks and Wildlife, meaning that they are poorly known and known from only a few locations but are not under imminent threat.

== See also ==
- List of Acacia species
