= Buntine, Western Australia =

Buntine
- Town
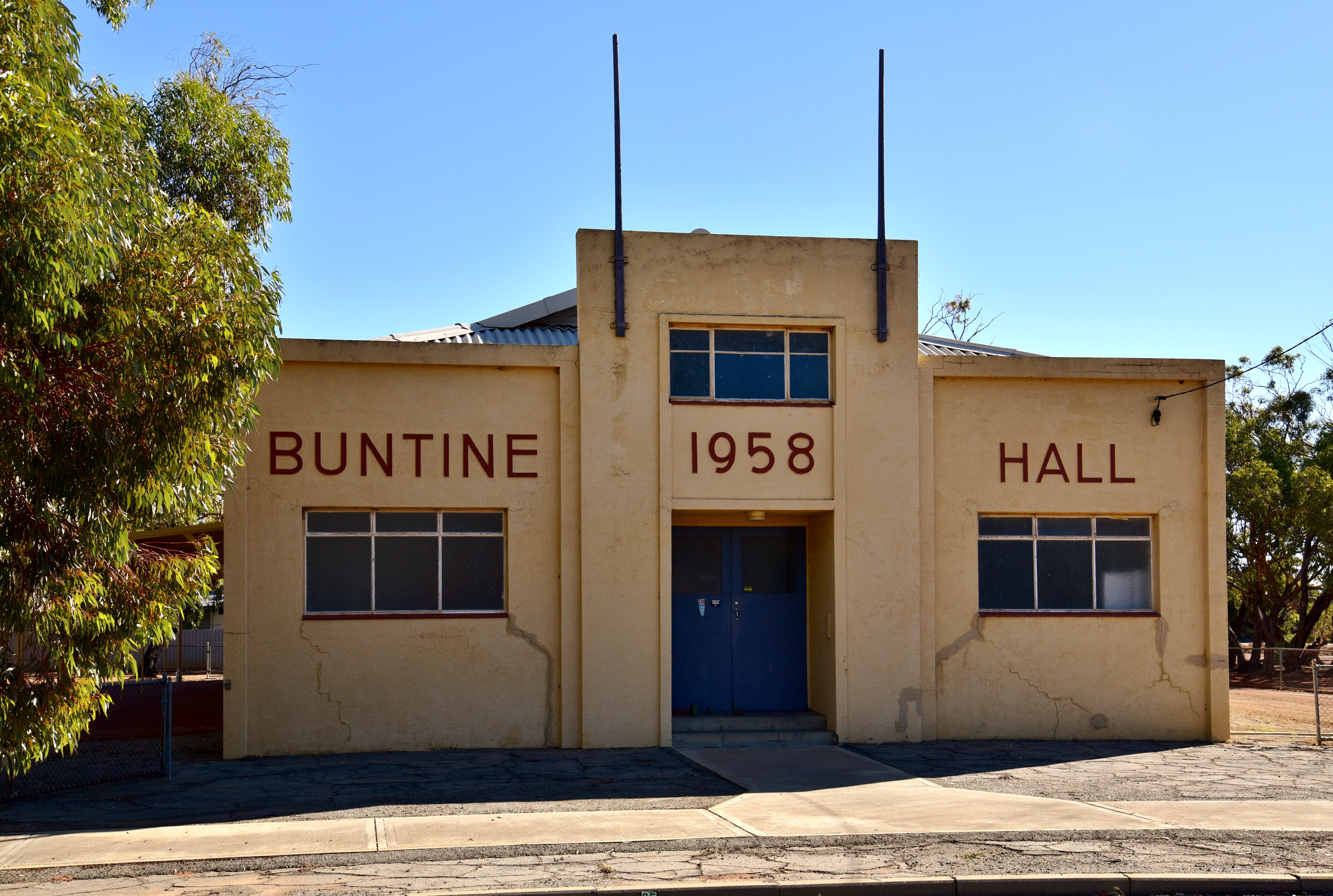
- Buntine Hall, 2018

- Interactive map of Buntine
- Coordinates: 29.986°S 116.569°E
- Country: Australia
- State: Western Australia
- LGA: Shire of Dalwallinu
- Location: 300 km (190 mi) NNE of Perth
- Established: 1916

Government
  - State electorate: Moore
  - Federal division: Durack

Area
  - Total: 571.6 km^{2} (220.7 sq mi)
- Elevation: 315 m (1,033 ft)

Population
  - Total: 51 (SAL 2021)
- Postcode: 6613

Buntine is a small town located in the Wheatbelt region of Western Australia, about 300 kilometres (186 mi) north of Perth, the state capital, along the Great Northern Highway within the Shire of Dalwallinu.

The name Buntine was first used in 1910 as the name of a nearby hill. In 1913, it was applied to a railway siding on the railway line between Wongan Hills and Mullewa, at the suggestion of District Surveyor J P Camm. The town of Buntine was gazetted in 1916.

In 1932 the Wheat Pool of Western Australia announced that the town would have two grain elevators, each fitted with an engine, installed at the railway siding.

A local bulk wheat bin was opened in the town in December 1949 just in time for the harvesting season with 280 long tons (280 thousand kilograms) being received on the first day.
