= Xantippe, Western Australia =

Town in the Wheatbelt region of Western Australia

Xantippe
- Town
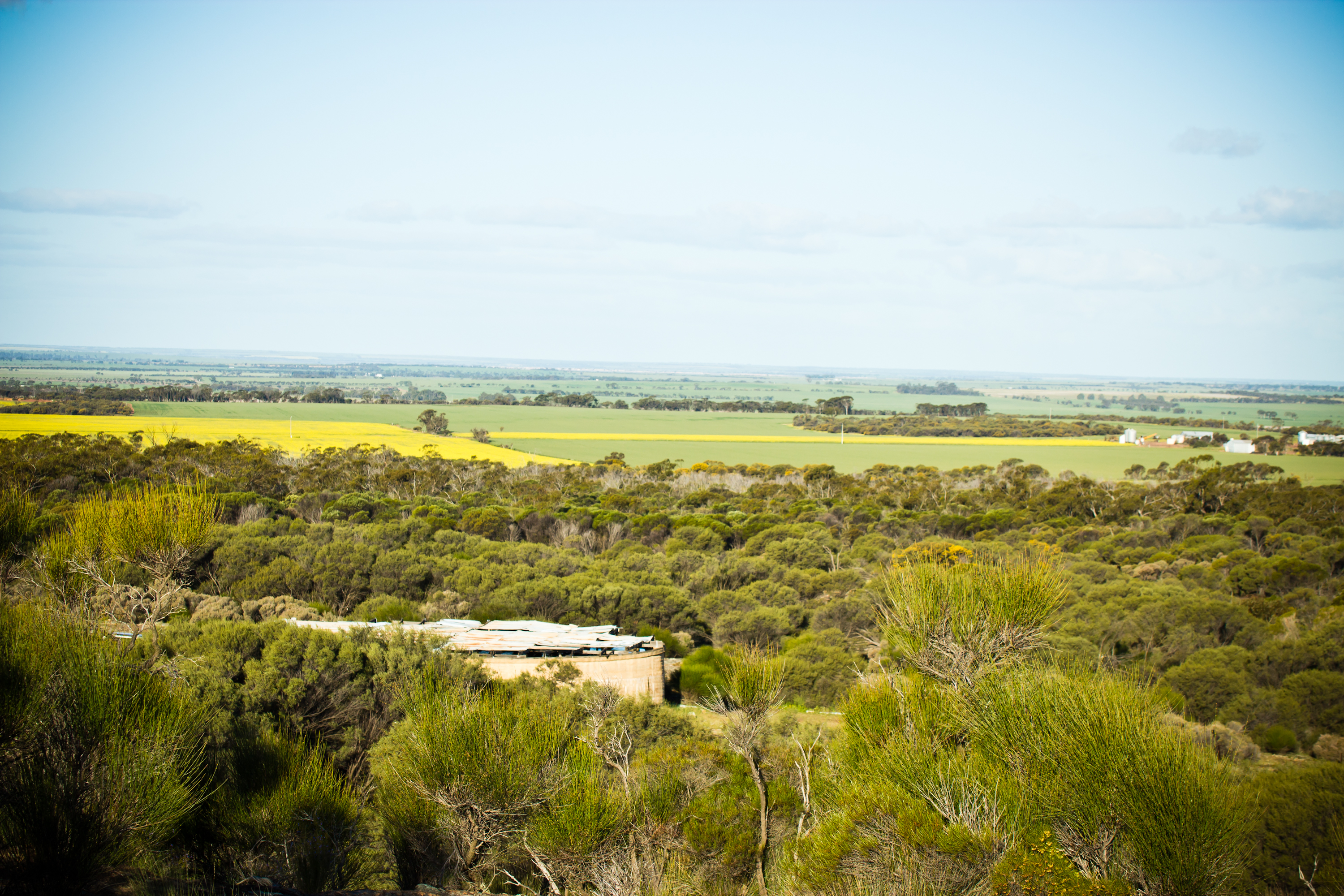
- View from near the top of Xantippe Rock

- Coordinates: 30.286°S 117.001°E
- Country: Australia
- State: Western Australia
- LGA(s): Shire of Dalwallinu
- Location: 285 km (177 mi) NNE of Perth; 45 km (28 mi) E of Dalwallinu, Western Australia
- Established: 1925

Area
  - Total: 247.2 km^{2} (95.4 sq mi)

Population
  - Total(s): 14 (SAL 2021)
- Time zone: UTC+8 (Australian Western Standard Time)
- Postcode: 6609

Xantippe is a rural locality in Western Australia, approximately 220 kilometres (140 mi) north east of Perth and 33 km (21 mi) east of Dalwallinu. It is the only place in Australia whose name starts with an X. In the 2016 census, the population was recorded as 20, in 9 families, of whom 55% were male and 45% female. The median age was 46.

There are two theories about the origin of the name - either it was named for Xanthippe, the wife of ancient Greek philosopher Socrates, or it translates to "looking for water from a deeper well". The locals reportedly favour the second explanation.

The first farms in the area were established in 1925, and a school was operated in the village from 1930 to 1940.

The most notable building in the area is a large water tank, begun in 1923 and completed in 1927, which was originally intended to supply water to Dalwallinu but because of problems with pumping water over the hills it ended up supplying local farms instead.

Surrounding the water tank is the Xantippe Nature Reserve which is a popular spot for tourists, offering 360° degree views from the top of the granite rock.

In 2019 Xantippe was used to represent the letter "X" in a set of collectable Australian one dollar coins. The set included a coin for each letter of the alphabet.
