= Pithara, Western Australia =

Pithara
- Town
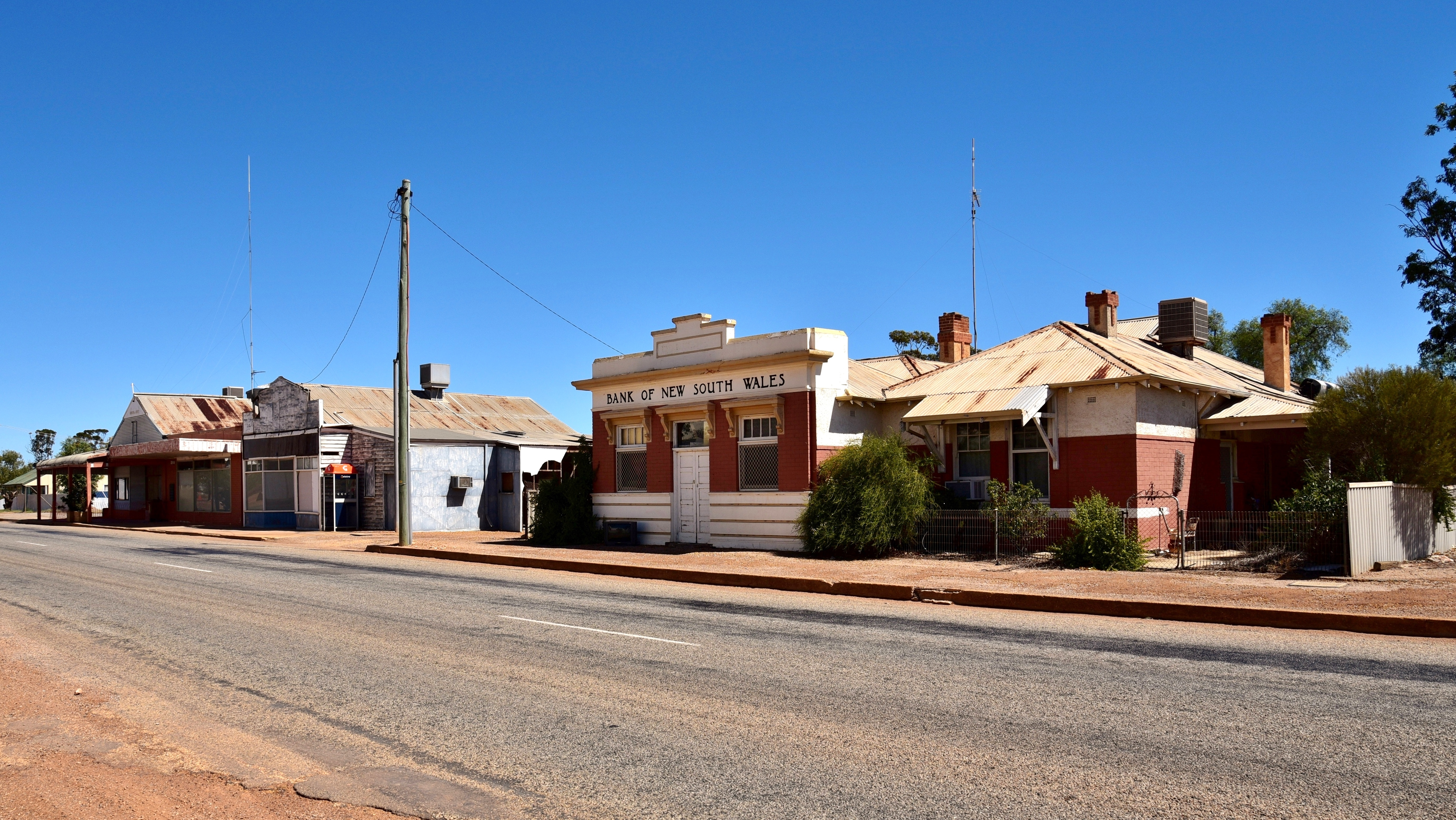
- Leahy Street, Pithara, 2018

- Coordinates: 30°23′S 116°40′E
- Country: Australia
- State: Western Australia
- LGA(s): Shire of Dalwallinu
- Location: 240 km (150 mi) N of Perth
- Established: 1914

Government
  - State electorate(s): Moore
  - Federal division(s): Durack

Area
  - Total: 566.7 km^{2} (218.8 sq mi)

Population
  - Total(s): 129 (SAL 2021)
- Postcode: 6608

Pithara is a small town in the Wheatbelt region of Western Australia. It is located about 240 km north of Perth, in the Shire of Dalwallinu. At the 2011 census, Pithara had a population of 257, a 25% fall from the previous 2006 census.

The name Pithara was originally an Aboriginal name for a nearby well, which first appears on maps of the area in 1907. In April 1913 it was approved as the name of a siding on the Wongan Hills to Mullewa railway line, which was under construction at the time. Shortly afterwards the decision was made to rename the siding to Hettie, after the original owner of the land on which the siding was built. In 1914 the government gazetted a townsite at the siding, also naming it Hettie, but this was objected to by locals, and the name Pithara was reinstated.

Pithara primarily serves as a base for the local farming community, and serves large numbers of visitors during the spring when wildflowers bloom in the region.

There is also an active speedway club in town and drivers visit from all over Western Australia to compete in a number of meetings during the year.

Shirley Strickland de la Hunty, Olympic gold medallist in the 80 metres hurdles at the 1948 Games in London and at the 1952 Games in Helsinki, grew up on a farm in Pithara.

The surrounding areas produce wheat and other cereal crops. The town is a receival site for Cooperative Bulk Handling. In 1932 the Wheat Pool of Western Australia installed two engine-driven grain elevators at the Pithara railway siding, marking the transition from manual handling of bagged grain to bulk handling.
