= Shire of Dalwallinu =

Local government area in the Wheatbelt region of Western Australia

- Local government area
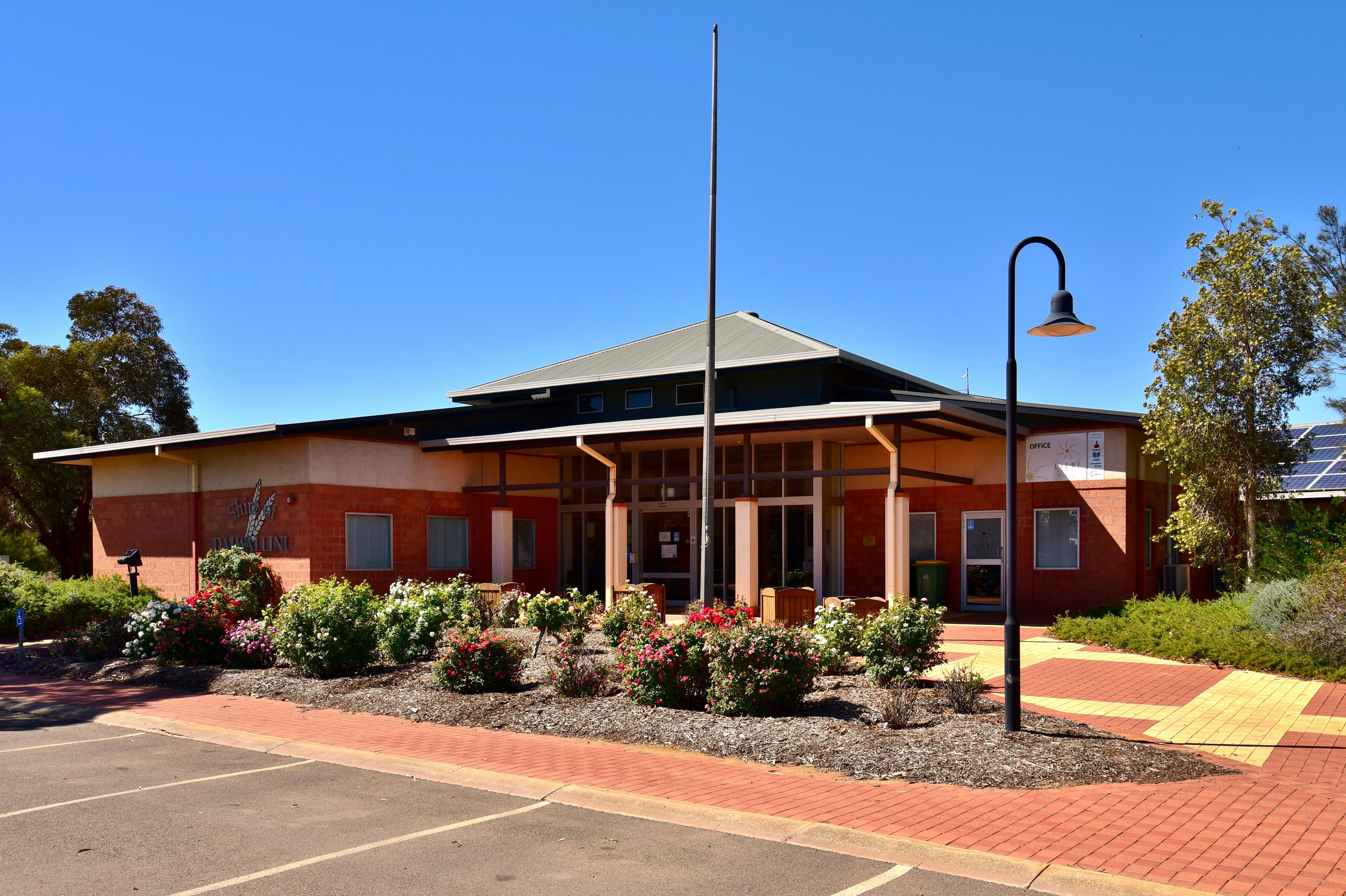
- Dalwallinu shire offices, 2018

- Interactive map of Shire of Dalwallinu
- Country: Australia
- State: Western Australia
- Region: Wheatbelt
- Established: 1916
- Council seat: Dalwallinu

Government
  - Shire President: Keith Carter
  - State electorate: Moore
  - Federal division: Durack

Area
  - Total: 7,235.8 km^{2} (2,793.8 sq mi)

Population
  - Total: 1,379 (LGA 2021)
- Website: Shire of Dalwallinu
LGAs around Shire of Dalwallinu
Coorow	Perenjori	Yalgoo
Coorow	Shire of Dalwallinu	Mount Marshall
Moora	Wongan-Ballidu	Koorda

The Shire of Dalwallinu is a local government area in the Wheatbelt region of Western Australia, about 250 kilometres (155 mi) NNE of Perth, the state capital. The Shire covers an area of 7,236 square kilometres (2,794 sq mi) and its seat of government is the town of Dalwallinu.

== History ==
Initially, the area was part of the Moora and Upper Irwin Road Districts. On 2 June 1916, the Dalwallinu Road District was created. On 1 July 1961, it became a shire following the enactment of the Local Government Act 1960.

== Wards ==
On 14 May 1966, the Shire was divided into four wards: Central, North, South and East Wards, and membership was increased from 9 to 11. On 22 May 1971, a new ward, Dalwallinu Townsite Ward with one councillor, was created and the council reduced back to 9 councillors by allocating 2 each to the original four wards. In 1992, the Central and Dalwallinu Townsite Wards were merged to form the new Central Ward, and on 3 May 2003, the Central and South Wards were merged to form the new South Ward.

As such, the present ward system of the shire is:

- East Ward (two councillors)
- North Ward (two councillors)
- South Ward (six councillors)

== Towns and localities ==
The towns and localities of the Shire of Dalwallinu with population and size figures based on the most recent Australian census:

Locality	Population	Area	Map
Buntine	51 (SAL 2021)	571.6 km^{2} (220.7 sq mi)	
Dalwallinu	826 (SAL 2021)	684.2 km^{2} (264.2 sq mi)	
East Damboring	9 (SAL 2021)	103.3 km^{2} (39.9 sq mi)	
Goodlands	29 (SAL 2021)	2,119.4 km^{2} (818.3 sq mi)	
Jibberding	24 (SAL 2021)	1,054.1 km^{2} (407.0 sq mi)	
Kalannie	147 (SAL 2021)	711 km^{2} (275 sq mi)	
Marne	10 (SAL 2021)	79.6 km^{2} (30.7 sq mi)	
Miamoon	17 (SAL 2021)	124.3 km^{2} (48.0 sq mi)	
Nugadong	11 (SAL 2021)	202.4 km^{2} (78.1 sq mi)	
Petrudor	20 (SAL 2021)	284.8 km^{2} (110.0 sq mi)	
Pithara	129 (SAL 2021)	566.7 km^{2} (218.8 sq mi)	
Wubin	90 (SAL 2021)	498 km^{2} (192 sq mi)	
Xantippe	14 (SAL 2021)	247.2 km^{2} (95.4 sq mi)	

== Population ==
Historical population

Year	Pop.	±% p.a.
1921	956	—
1933	2,226	+7.30%
1947	1,703	−1.89%
1954	2,148	+3.37%
1961	2,218	+0.46%
1966	2,425	+1.80%
1971	2,282	−1.21%
1976	2,178	−0.93%
1981	1,901	−2.68%

Year	Pop.	±% p.a.
1986	1,779	−1.32%
1991	1,573	−2.43%
1996	1,693	+1.48%
2001	1,656	−0.44%
2006	1,368	−3.75%
2011	1,266	−1.54%
2016	1,429	+2.45%
2021	1,379	−0.71%

== Heritage-listed places ==
As of 2023, 81 places are heritage-listed in the Shire of Dalwallinu, of which two are on the State Register of Heritage Places.

Place name	Place #	Street name	Suburb or town	Co-ordinates	Built	State registered	Notes & former names	Photo
Wubin Wheatbin	666	Great Northern Highway	Wubin	30.106684°S 116.630672°E	1939	13 April 2012	Wubin Wheatbin Museum, CBH Wheatbin	
Pithara Hall & Supper Room	667	41-43 Leahy Street	Pithara	30.387497°S 116.668564°E	1931	9 February 2016	Pithara Town Hall	
