= Burakin, Western Australia =

Town in the Wheatbelt region of Western Australia

Burakin
- Town
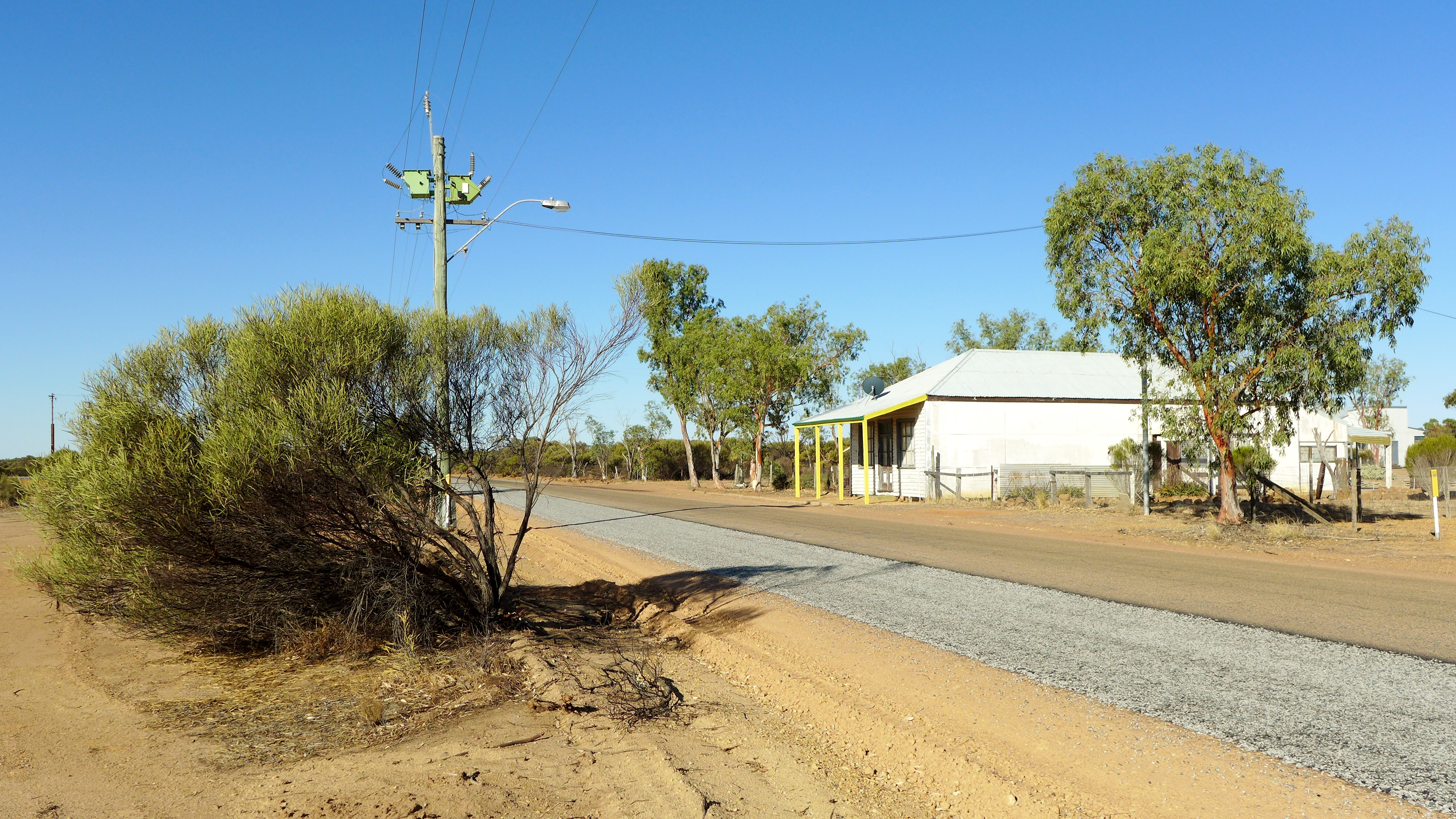
- Dowerin-Kalannie Road, Burakin, 2014

- Coordinates: 30.524°S 117.173°E
- Country: Australia
- State: Western Australia
- LGA(s): Shire of Wongan-Ballidu
- Location: 242 km (150 mi) NNE of Perth; 45 km (28 mi) NW of Koorda
- Established: 1928

Government
  - State electorate(s): Moore
  - Federal division(s): Durack

Area
  - Total: 342.5 km^{2} (132.2 sq mi)
- Elevation: 359 m (1,178 ft)

Population
  - Total(s): 30 (SAL 2021)
- Postcode: 6467

Burakin is a small town near Kalannie in the eastern Wheatbelt region of Western Australia.

The townsite was gazetted in 1928. The name is an Aboriginal word of unknown meaning, and was suggested by the Wongan Hills Road Board in 1927. The original spelling was to have been Borrikin.

== Railways ==
Burakin is the junction for the Amery to Kalannie railway line and the branch railway line to Bonnie Rock. The line was completed on 27 April 1931. Despite aspirations for the railway in the 1930s. services between Beacon and Bonnie Rock were under threat of suspension in 1953, and closed in the same year.

== Earthquakes ==
In 2000 and 2001 Burakin was the epicentre of a series of earthquakes, now known as the Burakin Swarm – a significant series of seismographic events that are considered important in understanding the South West Seismic Zone.
