= Bonnie Rock =

- Town
- Coordinates: 30°32′S 118°22′E
- Country: Australia
- State: Western Australia
- LGA: Shire of Mukinbudin
- Location: 346 km (215 mi) east north east of Perth; 45 km (28 mi) north north east of Mukinbudin; 119 km (74 mi) north west of Southern Cross
- Established: 1932

Government
  - State electorate: Central Wheatbelt
  - Federal division: Durack
- Elevation: 417 m (1,368 ft)
- Postcode: 6479

Bonnie Rock is a small town in the Wheatbelt region of Western Australia.

The town was once the terminus of the railway line from Burakin.

The name of the town originated from a rock formation that is situated close to the town, that was named by a sandalwood cutter. The townsite was gazetted in 1932.

A short-lived newspaper in the 1930s included the name of the town in its title.

The main industry in the town is wheat farming, with the town being a CBH Group receival site.

The Russian adventurer Fyodor Konyukhov broke the record for the fastest circumnavigation of the Earth in a hot air balloon in just over 11 days, landing safely near Bonnie Rock at about 4.30pm (local time) on 23 July 2016.
