= Kalannie, Western Australia =

Town in the Wheatbelt region of Western Australia

Kalannie
- Town
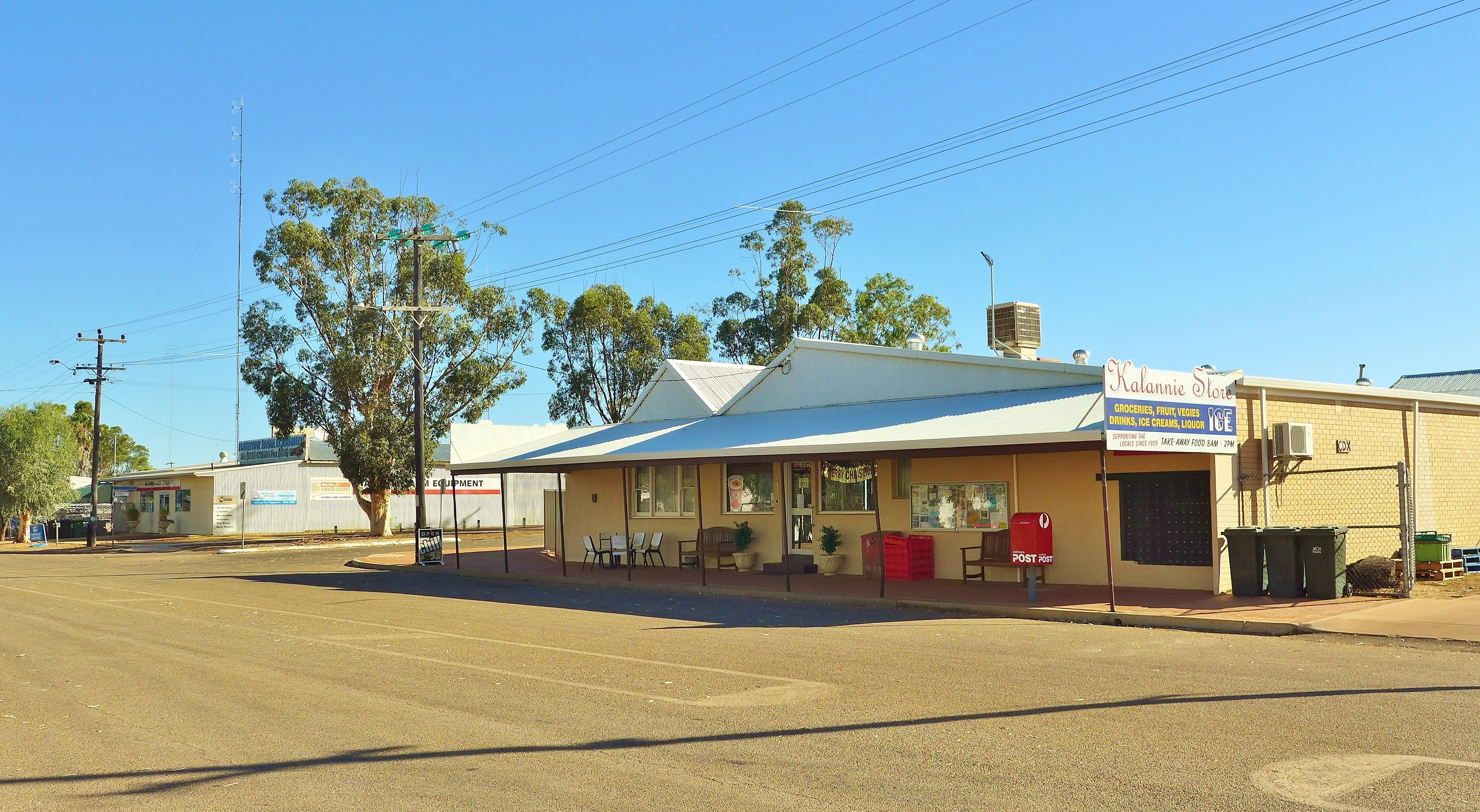
- Roche Street, Kalannie, 2014

- Coordinates: 30.36°S 117.12°E
- Country: Australia
- State: Western Australia
- LGA(s): Shire of Dalwallinu
- Location: 259 km (161 mi) north east of Perth; 45 km (28 mi) east of Dalwallinu; 70 km (43 mi) north east of Wongan Hills
- Established: 1929

Government
  - State electorate(s): Moore
  - Federal division(s): Durack

Area
  - Total: 711 km^{2} (275 sq mi)
- Elevation: 345 m (1,132 ft)

Population
  - Total(s): 147 (SAL 2021)
- Postcode: 6468

Kalannie is a small town in the Shire of Dalwallinu, in the Wheatbelt region of Western Australia, approximately 259 kilometres (161 mi) north-east of the state capital, Perth.

Kalannie was gazetted as a townsite in 1929. The name is Aboriginal, and is in a list of names from the York area where the meaning is given as "where the Aboriginals got white stone for their spears".

In 1932 the Wheat Pool of Western Australia announced that the town would have two grain elevators, each fitted with an engine, installed at the railway siding.

The main resources in Kalannie are wheat and gypsum. Kalannie is connected to the narrow gauge rail network from a branch-line on the Amery to Kalannie railway line. The town is a receival site for Cooperative Bulk Handling.
