= Wubin, Western Australia =

Wubin
- Town
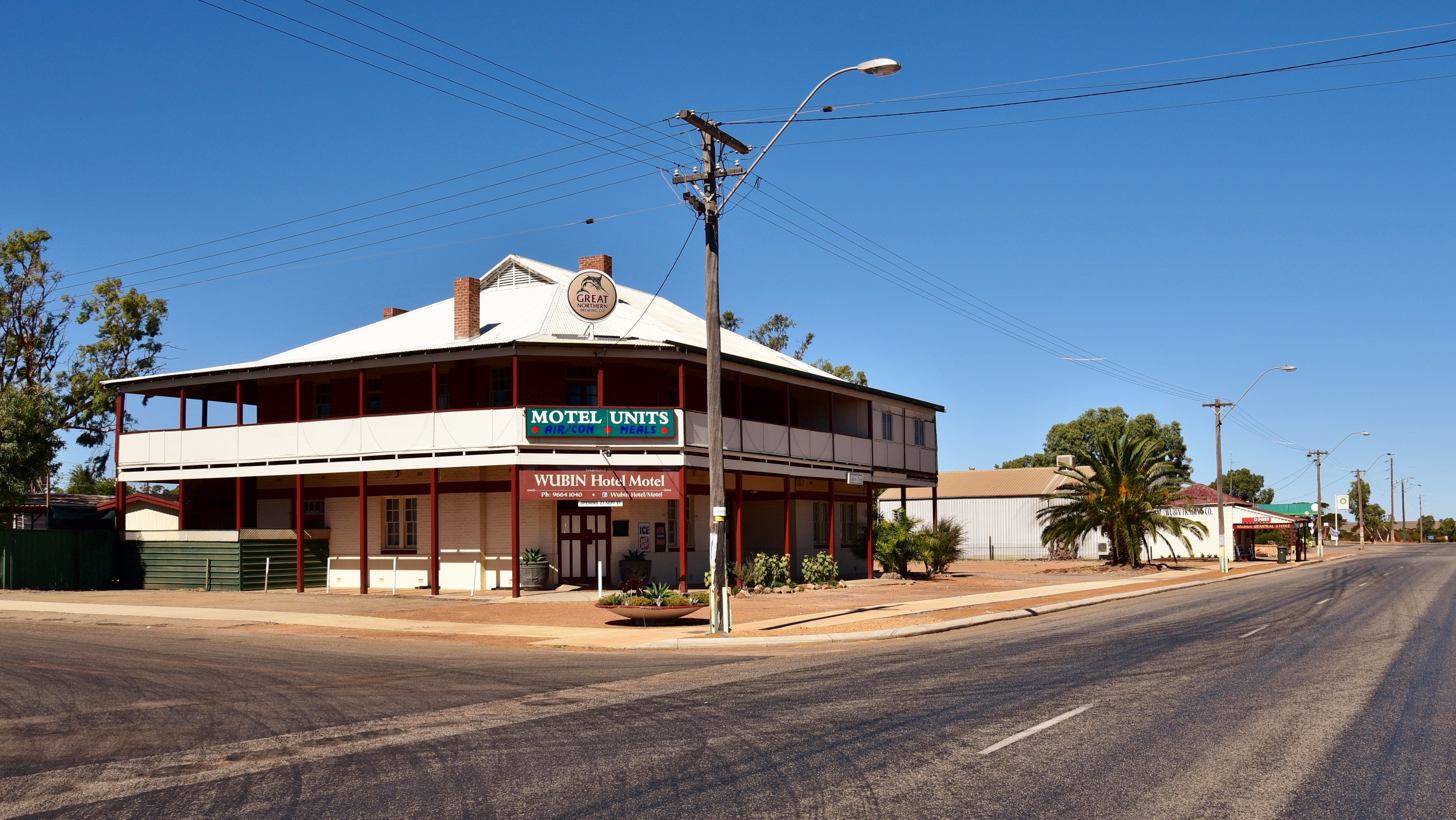
- Great Northern Highway, Wubin, 2018

- Interactive map of Wubin
- Coordinates: 30°06′24″S 116°37′54″E
- Country: Australia
- State: Western Australia
- LGA: Shire of Dalwallinu
- Location: 272 km (169 mi) NNE of Perth; 21 km (13 mi) N of Dalwallinu
- Established: 1913

Government
  - State electorate: Moore
  - Federal division: Durack

Area
  - Total: 498 km^{2} (192 sq mi)
- Elevation: 326 m (1,070 ft)

Population
  - Total: 90 (SAL 2021)
- Postcode: 6612

Wubin is a small town located in the northern Wheatbelt region of Western Australia, 272 kilometres (169 mi) north-northeast of Perth and 21 kilometres (13 mi) north of Dalwallinu.

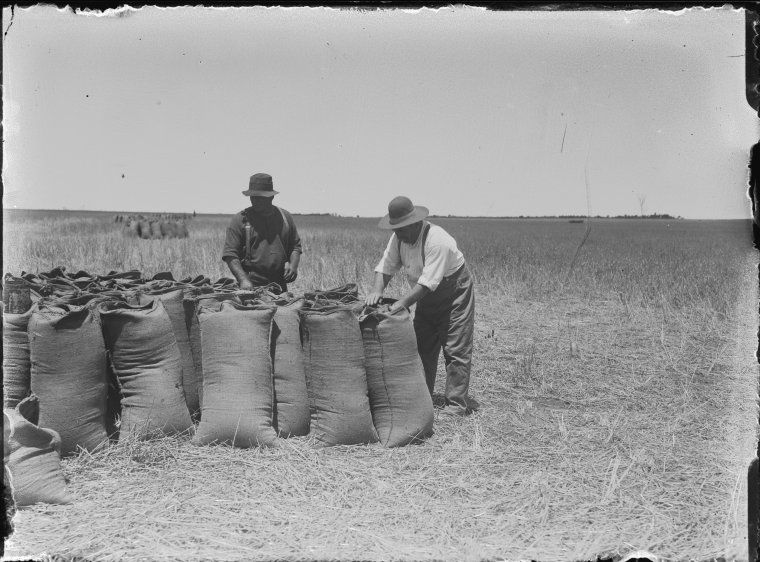
Bagging wheat at Wubin, 1922

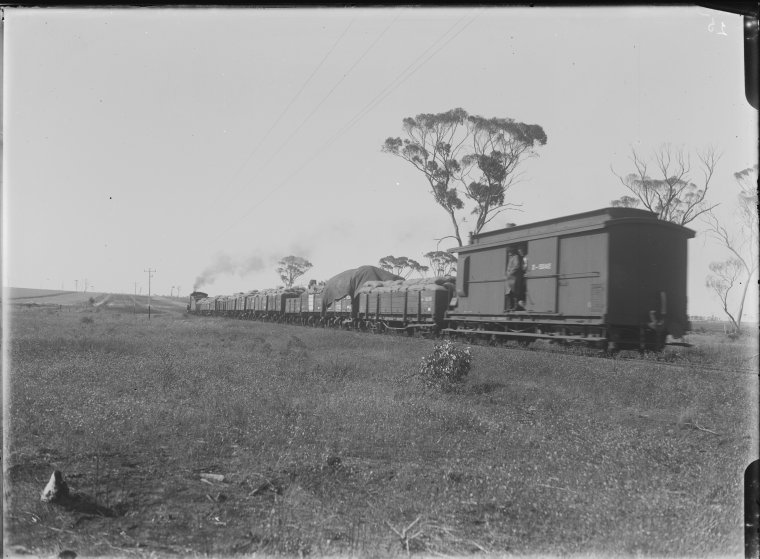
Train loaded with bagged wheat, Wubin 1922

Wubin was originally approved as a siding name on the proposed Wongan Hills to Mullewa railway line in April 1913, land also being set aside and a townsite gazetted the same year. The first lots in the townsite were sold in June 1914, and the railway line opened in 1915. Wubin derives its name from the Aboriginal name for a nearby water source, Woobin Well, first recorded by a surveyor in 1907. The spelling Wubin was adopted to conform with spelling rules for Aboriginal names adopted by the Lands & Surveys Department.

In 1936 Co-operative Bulk Handling Ltd converted the siding to grain bulk handling, installing diesel powered bucket elevators to replace the system of manhandling grain onto rail wagons in hessian sacks.

Wubin flourished like most farming towns during the post World War II era; during that time an all-weather road was constructed across Lake Moore to Paynes Find substantially reducing travel times north to the mining areas in the Murchison and Pilbara regions. It is this road, part of the Great Northern Highway, that is now the economic heart of the town.

In 2007 the Wubin Primary School, established 18 August 1919, was closed by the Department of Education as a result of falling enrolments.
