= Beacon, Western Australia =

Beacon
- Town
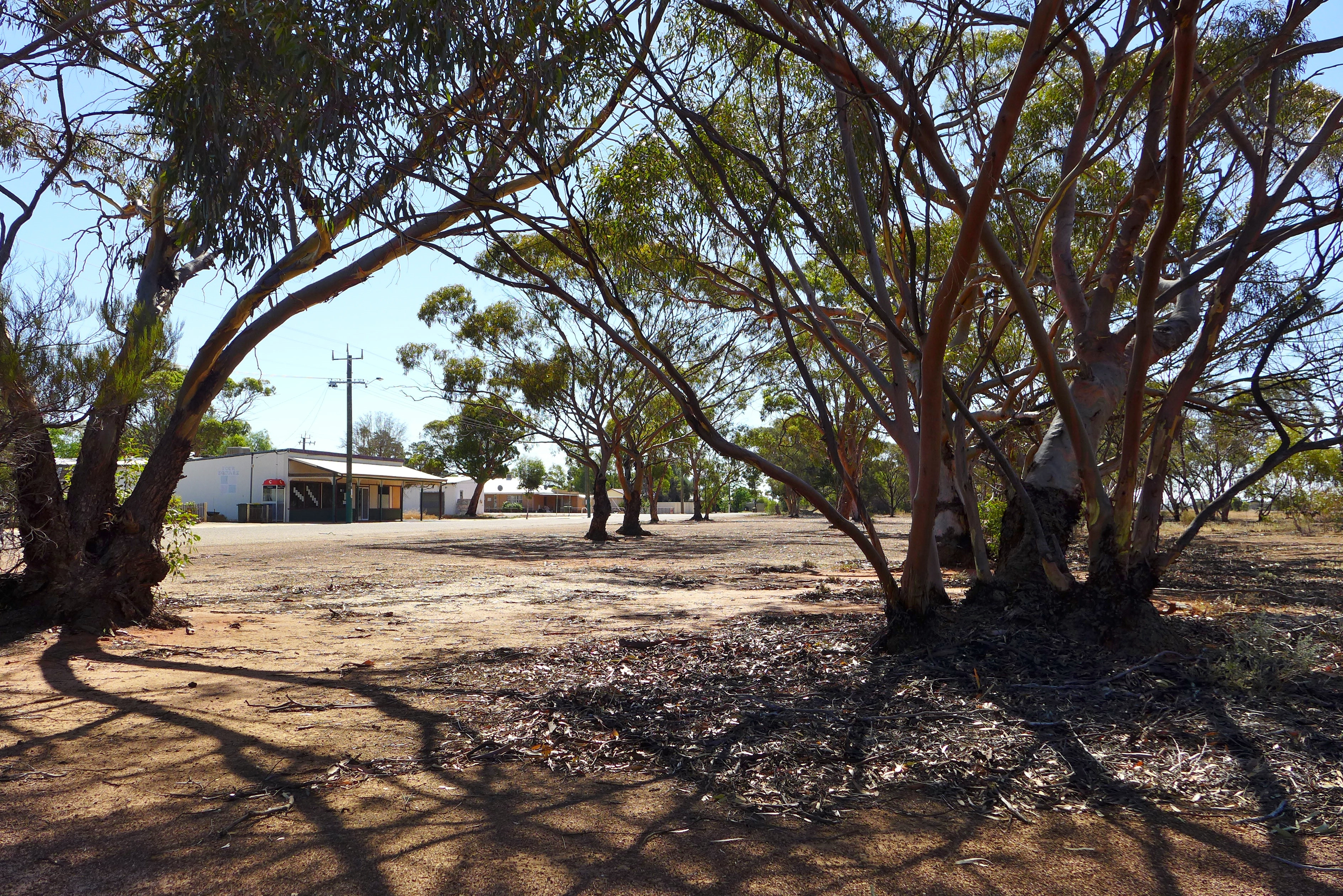
- Lindsay Street, Beacon, 2014

- Coordinates: 30.448°S 117.866°E
- Country: Australia
- State: Western Australia
- LGA(s): Shire of Mount Marshall
- Location: 333 km (207 mi) north east of Perth; 42 km (26 mi) north of Bencubbin; 55 km (34 mi) north east of Koorda
- Established: 1931

Government
  - State electorate(s): Central Wheatbelt
  - Federal division(s): Durack

Area
  - Total: 701.3 km^{2} (270.8 sq mi)
- Elevation: 373 m (1,224 ft)

Population
  - Total(s): 123 (SAL 2021)
- Postcode: 6472

Beacon is a town in Western Australia, in the Shire of Mount Marshall. It is 42 km (26 mi) north of Bencubbin and 333 km (207 mi) northeast of Perth by road.

It is on the northeast border of the Wheatbelt region with agriculture being one of the major occupations in the area. The surrounding areas produce wheat and other cereal crops. The town is a receival site for Cooperative Bulk Handling.

== History ==
The first European to explore the area was John Septimus Roe in 1836.

Shepherds were known to frequent the area in the 1870s to feed on the open grasslands, they were followed by sandalwood cutters in the 1880s.

In 1889 the surveyor H King explored and charted the region and shortly afterward land was opened up for agriculture around Bencubbin.

More surveyors went to work in 1921 making 1,000 acres (405 ha) blocks and the earliest settlers in Beacon acquired farmland in 1922.

The town is named after a local geographical feature called Beacon Rock; the name of the town, in 1929, was supposed to be Beacon Rock. The rock part of the name was dropped some time later and the townsite of Beacon was gazetted in 1931.

Beacon was connected to the narrow gauge railway system on 27 April 1931 through the Burakin to Bonnie Rock railway line.

In 1932 the Wheat Pool of Western Australia announced that the town would have two grain elevators, each fitted with an engine, installed at the railway siding.

== Notable residents ==
- Len Hamilton, farmer and member of federal parliament (1946-1961)
