= Dalwallinu, Western Australia =

Dalwallinu
- Town
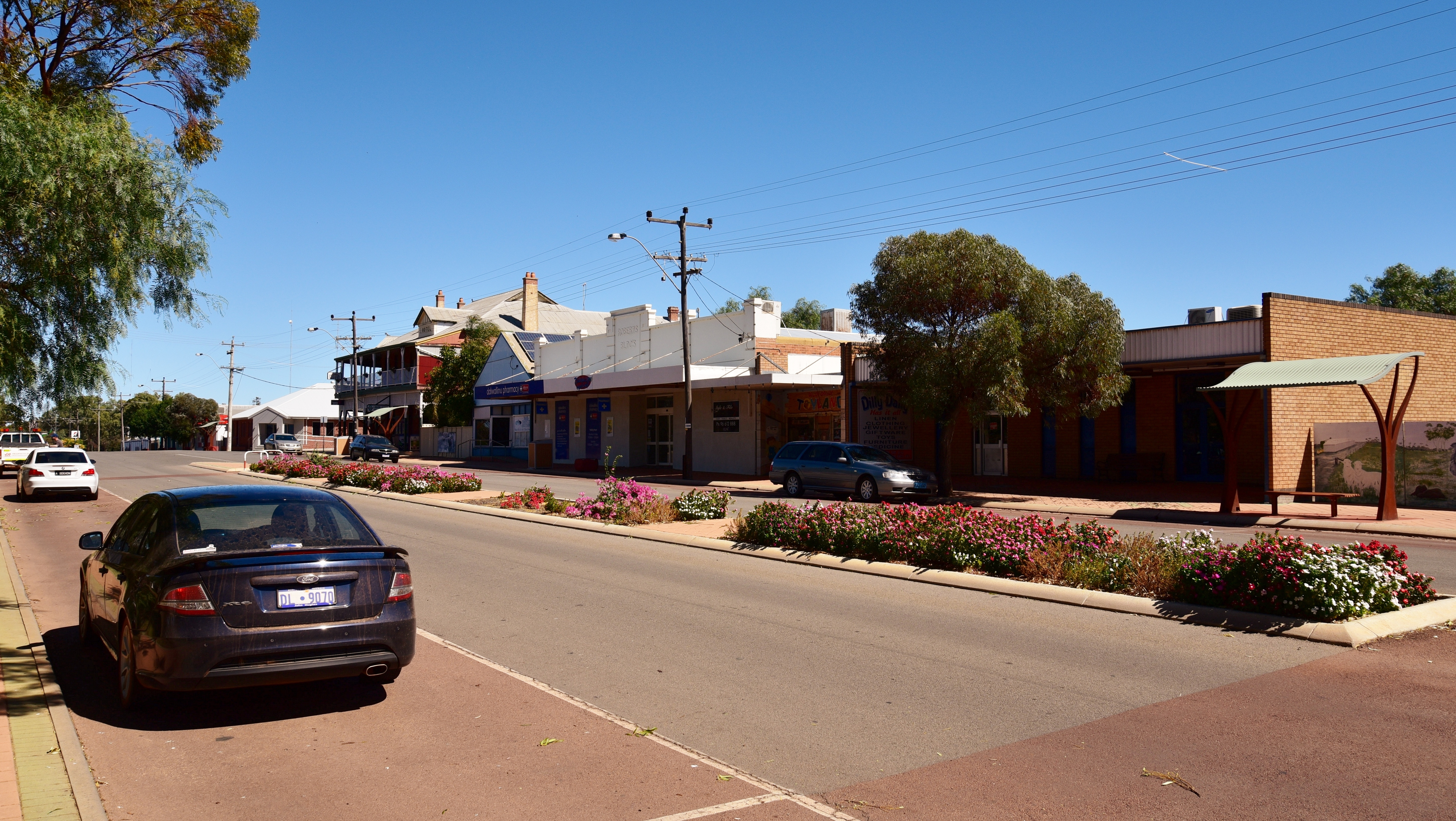
- Johnston Street, Dalwallinu, 2018

- Interactive map of Dalwallinu
- Coordinates: 30.2765°S 116.6625°E
- Country: Australia
- State: Western Australia
- LGA: Shire of Dalwallinu
- Location: 248 km (154 mi) NNE of Perth
- Established: 1910

Government
  - State electorate: Moore
  - Federal division: Durack

Area
  - Total: 684.2 km^{2} (264.2 sq mi)
- Elevation: 335 m (1,099 ft)

Population
  - Total: 713 (UCL 2021)
- Postcode: 6609
- Mean max temp: 26.0 °C (78.8 °F)
- Mean min temp: 12.1 °C (53.8 °F)
- Annual rainfall: 357.3 mm (14.07 in)

Dalwallinu (/ˈdaʊlwɒlɪnju/ or /dælˈwɒlənju/), colloquially called Dally, is a town in the Wheatbelt region of Western Australia, located 248 km from Perth via the Great Northern Highway. Agriculture and supporting industries are the town's primary economic activities. The town is the first town on the Wildflower Way, a tourist route that stretches north to Mullewa. The town has an elevation of 335 metres (1,099 ft). At the 2016 census, Dalwallinu had a population of 699.

The name of the town comes from a now unknown Aboriginal word that means "place to wait a while" or possibly "good lands". Traditionally, the Badimaya people lived in the northern areas of the shire and the Karlamaya people inhabited the southern areas.

Originally called South Nugadong, the town was officially gazetted in 1914.

The first Europeans to arrive were Benedictine monks who came from New Norcia to graze their sheep on the pastoral leases that they had taken up. The first settlers arrived, hoping to develop the lands for wheat, in 1907. The region was surveyed in 1909 and then opened for selection in 1910 with crops being planted shortly afterward.

Two brothers, Albert and Frederick Ellison, built a well on the southern end of the township in 1909. The well acted as a permanent source of water to the settlers. The well, named Billum Billum well, was built from locally occurring timber such as gimlet and salmon gum.

In 1932 the Wheat Pool of Western Australia announced that the town would have two grain elevators, each fitted with an engine, installed at the railway siding. Dalwallinu is on the railway line that used to be utilised for Northam to Mullewa rail services, such as The Mullewa. They no longer operate, with the line inoperational between Dalwallinu and Perenjori South.

== Climate ==
Climate data for Dalwallinu (1991–2020 normals, extremes 1997–present)
Month	Jan	Feb	Mar	Apr	May	Jun	Jul	Aug	Sep	Oct	Nov	Dec	Year
Record high °C (°F)	46.5 (115.7)	46.9 (116.4)	41.7 (107.1)	39.2 (102.6)	34.0 (93.2)	28.1 (82.6)	25.3 (77.5)	32.8 (91.0)	36.7 (98.1)	40.1 (104.2)	43.5 (110.3)	45.6 (114.1)	46.9 (116.4)
Mean daily maximum °C (°F)	35.3 (95.5)	34.6 (94.3)	31.4 (88.5)	27.1 (80.8)	22.1 (71.8)	18.6 (65.5)	17.3 (63.1)	18.4 (65.1)	21.2 (70.2)	26.3 (79.3)	30.0 (86.0)	33.2 (91.8)	26.3 (79.3)
Daily mean °C (°F)	26.6 (79.9)	26.5 (79.7)	23.9 (75.0)	20.1 (68.2)	15.8 (60.4)	12.9 (55.2)	11.8 (53.2)	12.3 (54.1)	14.1 (57.4)	18.0 (64.4)	21.5 (70.7)	24.5 (76.1)	19.0 (66.2)
Mean daily minimum °C (°F)	17.9 (64.2)	18.3 (64.9)	16.3 (61.3)	13.1 (55.6)	9.5 (49.1)	7.1 (44.8)	6.3 (43.3)	6.2 (43.2)	6.9 (44.4)	9.7 (49.5)	13.0 (55.4)	15.8 (60.4)	11.7 (53.1)
Record low °C (°F)	10.5 (50.9)	9.2 (48.6)	6.5 (43.7)	3.4 (38.1)	1.0 (33.8)	0.3 (32.5)	−1.0 (30.2)	−1.0 (30.2)	−0.2 (31.6)	−1.0 (30.2)	4.0 (39.2)	5.0 (41.0)	−1.0 (30.2)
Average precipitation mm (inches)	17.7 (0.70)	15.9 (0.63)	21.3 (0.84)	16.5 (0.65)	36.8 (1.45)	39.6 (1.56)	51.9 (2.04)	42.1 (1.66)	25.2 (0.99)	13.5 (0.53)	12.3 (0.48)	12.4 (0.49)	305.2 (12.02)
Average precipitation days (≥ 1.0 mm)	1.6	2.1	2.4	2.3	5.3	7.3	8.1	7.6	5.2	2.6	2.4	1.7	48.7
Average dew point °C (°F)	9.4 (48.9)	10.7 (51.3)	9.9 (49.8)	9.1 (48.4)	7.6 (45.7)	7.0 (44.6)	6.9 (44.4)	6.9 (44.4)	7.0 (44.6)	6.3 (43.3)	6.5 (43.7)	7.7 (45.9)	7.9 (46.2)
Source 1: National Oceanic and Atmospheric Administration
Source 2: Bureau of Meteorology
