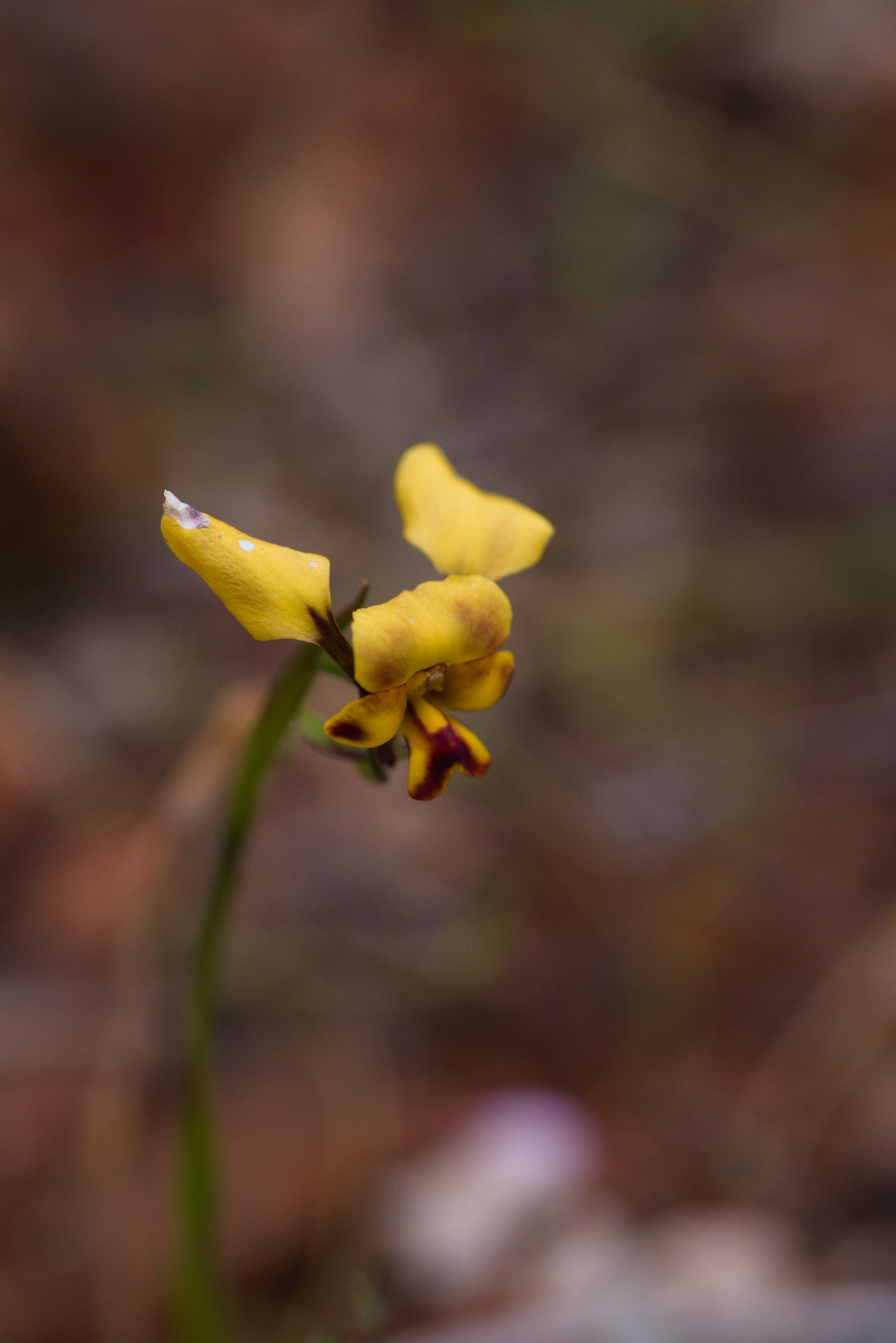

Scientific classification
- Kingdom: Plantae
- Clade: Tracheophytes
- Clade: Angiosperms
- Clade: Monocots
- Order: Asparagales
- Family: Orchidaceae
- Subfamily: Orchidoideae
- Tribe: Diurideae
- Genus: Diuris
- Species: D. suffusa

Binomial name
- Diuris suffusa D.L.Jones & C.J.French

= Diuris suffusa =

Species of orchid

Diuris suffusa, commonly known as mottled donkey orchid, is a species of orchid that is endemic to the south-west of Western Australia. It has two or three linear to lance-shaped leaves and up to seven cream-coloured to creamy-yellow flowers with light brown to reddish-brown markings.

== Description ==
Diuris suffusa is a tuberous, perennial herb with two or three linear to lance-shaped leaves 100–200 mm (3.9–7.9 in) long and 4–10 mm (0.16–0.39 in) wide. Up to seven cream-coloured to creamy-yellow flowers with light brown to reddish-brown markings, 20–27 mm (0.79–1.06 in) long and 15–25 mm (0.59–0.98 in) wide are borne on a flowering stem 150–300 mm (5.9–11.8 in) tall. The dorsal sepal is egg-shaped, 5–8 mm (0.20–0.31 in) long, 7–10 mm (0.28–0.39 in) wide and curved backwards, the lateral sepals narrowly oblong, turned back and crossed, 9–16 mm (0.35–0.63 in) long and 1.5–3 mm (0.059–0.118 in) wide. The petal blades are oblong to elliptic, 8–13 mm (0.31–0.51 in) long and 5–8 mm (0.20–0.31 in) wide on a stalk 3.0–4.5 mm (0.12–0.18 in) long. The labellum is 4–6 mm (0.16–0.24 in) long with three lobes - the centre lobe wedge-shaped, 4–6 mm (0.16–0.24 in) long and 5–6 mm (0.20–0.24 in) wide, the side lobes spread widely apart and oblong, 4–6 mm (0.16–0.24 in) long and 3–4 mm (0.12–0.16 in) wide. There is a single smooth, yellow callus ridge 3–4 mm (0.12–0.16 in) long, along the mid-line of the labellum. Flowering occurs from late August to late September.

== Taxonomy and naming ==
Diuris suffusa was first formally described in 2016 by David Jones and Christopher J. French in Australian Orchid Review, from a specimen collected by French near the Trayning to Bencubbin road in 1999. The specific epithet (suffusa) means "suffused" or "tinged", referring to the pale colour of the flowers, tinged with darker colours.

== Distribution and habitat ==
Mottled donkey orchid grows in low shrubland and shrubby woodland in the area between Bencubbin, Trayning, Wyalkatchem and Koorda in the Avon Wheatbelt and Coolgardie bioregions of south-western Western Australia.

== Conservation ==
Diuris suffusa is listed as "not threatened" by the Western Australian Government Department of Biodiversity, Conservation and Attractions.
