= Welbungin, Western Australia =

Welbungin
- Town
- Coordinates: 30°50′S 117°59′E
- Country: Australia
- State: Western Australia
- LGA(s): Shire of Mount Marshall
- Location: 287 km (178 mi) ENE of Perth; 13 km (8.1 mi) east of Bencubbin
- Established: 1923

Government
  - State electorate(s): Central Wheatbelt
  - Federal division(s): Durack

Area
  - Total: 875.3 km^{2} (338.0 sq mi)
- Elevation: 348 m (1,142 ft)

Population
  - Total(s): 35 (SAL 2021)
- Postcode: 6477

Welbungin is a small town located just off the Koorda–Southern Cross road 287 km (178 mi) from Perth in the Wheatbelt region of Western Australia.

Land was reserved in the area for a town hall as early as 1915 but it was not until the extension of the railway line from Mount Mashall to Lake Brown was planned to pass close by and that a station would be established in 1921 that the local primary producers association began to campaign for a town to be gazetted. The area was also known locally as Polkinghome's Corner but was gazetted in 1923 as Welbunging. The spelling was later changed to its current spelling in 1944. The name of the town is Aboriginal in origin and was first recorded in 1889 by early surveyors after the name of a nearby hill.

In 1932 the Wheat Pool of Western Australia announced that the town would have two grain elevators, each fitted with an engine, installed at the railway siding.

The surrounding areas produce wheat and other cereal crops. The town is a receival site for Cooperative Bulk Handling.
