= Training (disambiguation) =

Training is the teaching of knowledge, vocational or practical matters.

- Physical training:
  - Physical fitness training
  - Training as a part of Physical exercise
  - Eccentric training
  - Sports training
- Instructor-led training
- Animal training
  - Dog training

Training may also refer to:

- AI training of a machine learning system using prepared data (the training set)
- Training (meteorology), a successive series of showers or thunderstorms moving repeatedly over the same area
- Training of rivers, the use of structures built to constrain rivers
- Training, the pointing of turreted guns in a particular direction
- Training (poem), a poem by Wilfred Owen
- "Training" (The Office), a 2001 television episode

== See also ==
- Trayning, Western Australia
  - Shire of Trayning, local government area
