= Acacia intricata =

Scientific classification
- Kingdom: Plantae
- Clade: Embryophytes
- Clade: Tracheophytes
- Clade: Spermatophytes
- Clade: Angiosperms
- Clade: Eudicots
- Clade: Rosids
- Order: Fabales
- Family: Fabaceae
- Subfamily: Caesalpinioideae
- Clade: Mimosoid clade
- Genus: Acacia
- Species: A. intricata

Binomial name
- Acacia intricata S.Moore
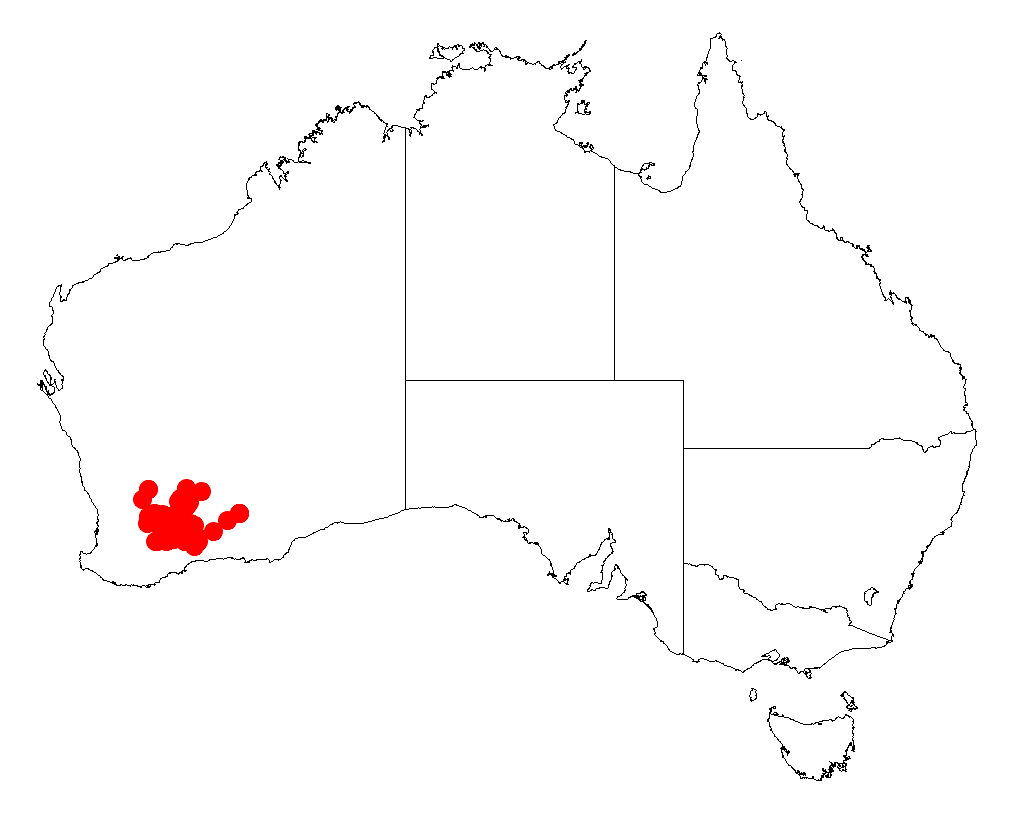
- Occurrence data from AVH

Synonyms
- Racosperma intricatum (S.Moore) Pedley

Species of legume

Acacia intricata is a species of flowering plant in the family Fabaceae and is endemic to the south-west of Western Australia. It is a dense, compact, intricate shrub with sessile, egg-shaped, rigid, sharply pointed phyllodes, spherical heads of bright golden yellow flowers and curved to coiled pods.

== Description ==
Acacia intricata is a dense, compact, intricate and prickly shrub that typically grows to a height of 15–50 cm (5.9–19.7 in) and sometimes forms prostrate mounds. Its end branches are ascending to erect, short, straight, rigid, somewhat spiny and sometimes covered with a white, powdery bloom. Its phyllodes are sessile, more or less horizontal, usually egg-shaped to broadly egg-shaped, usually 2–4 mm (0.079–0.157 in) long and 1–3 mm (0.039–0.118 in) wide, rigid, thick and sharply pointed with one vein on each side. There are stipules at the base of the phyllodes but fall off early. The flowers are borne in two spherical heads in axils on peduncles 1.5–4 mm (0.059–0.157 in) long, each head with 7 to 13 showy, bright golden yellow flowers. Flowering occurs from July to September, and the pods are curved to openly once-coiled, up to 26 mm (1.0 in) long and 2.0–2.5 mm (0.079–0.098 in) wide. The seeds are 2.7–2.9 mm (0.11–0.11 in) long, often mottled with a white aril, ½ or more the length of the seed.

== Taxonomy ==
Acacia intricata was first formally described in 1920 by the botanist Spencer Le Marchant Moore in the Journal of the Linnean Society, Botany from specimens collected on Mount Marshall by Frederick Stoward. The specific epithet (intricata) means'entangled', referring to the habit of the plant.

== Distribution and habitat ==
This species of wattle grows in loam, clay and gravelly sand in woodland and mallee shrubland from Bencubbin and Jaurdi Station (north of Yellowdine) and south to Lake Grace and Lake King in the Avon Wheatbelt, Coolgardie and Mallee bioregions in south-western Western Australia.

== Conservation status ==
Acacia intricata is listed as 'not threatened' by the Government of Western Australia Department of Biodiversity, Conservation and Attractions.

== See also ==
- List of Acacia species
