= List of State Register of Heritage Places in the Shire of Trayning =

List of heritage sites in Western Australia

The State Register of Heritage Places is maintained by the Heritage Council of Western Australia. As of 2026, 55 places are heritage-listed in the Shire of Trayning, of which four are on the State Register of Heritage Places.

== List ==
The Western Australian State Register of Heritage Places, as of 2026, lists the following four state registered places within the Shire of Trayning:

| Place name | Place # | Street number | Street name | Suburb or town | Co-ordinates | Notes & former names | Photo |
|---|---|---|---|---|---|---|---|
| All Saints Anglican Church | 2589 | | Coronation Street | Trayning | 31.115757°S 117.794451°E | | |
| Trayning Police Station & former Police Quarters | 2596 | | Sutherland Street | Trayning | 31.112722°S 117.793856°E | | |
| All Saints Anglican Church, Trayning | 17596 | | Coronation Street | Trayning | 31.115757°S 117.794451°E | | |
| Police Quarters | 17864 | | Sutherland Street | Trayning | 31.112723°S 117.793812°E | Part of Trayning Police Station & former Police Quarters Precinct (2596) | |
