= List of State Register of Heritage Places in the Shire of Wyalkatchem =

List of heritage sites in Western Australia

The State Register of Heritage Places is maintained by the Heritage Council of Western Australia. As of 2026, 133 places are heritage-listed in the Shire of Wyalkatchem, of which ten are on the State Register of Heritage Places.

== List ==
The Western Australian State Register of Heritage Places, as of 2026, lists the following ten state registered places within the Shire of Wyalkatchem:

Place name	Place #	Street number	Street name	Suburb or town	Co-ordinates	Notes & former names	Photo
Lady Novar Hostel (former)	2757	Lot 148	Honour Avenue	Wyalkatchem	31.175093°S 117.38555°E	Silver Chain Bush Nursing Post	
National Bank, Wyalkatchem	2759	25	Railway Terrace	Wyalkatchem	31.180823°S 117.382732°E	National Australia Bank	
CBH Wheat Bin (former)	2761		Railway Terrace	Wyalkatchem	31.180205°S 117.380115°E	Agricultural Museum	
Wyalkatchem Station Master's House	15748	5	Grace Street	Wyalkatchem		Demolished in 2003	
Wyalkatchem Railway and CBH Precinct	15755		Railway Terrace & Grace Street	Wyalkatchem	31.180192°S 117.379579°E	Wyalkatchem Railway Station, Wyalkatchem Wheat Bins	
Goods Shed Wyalkatchem	16982		Railway Terrace	Wyalkatchem	31.180797°S 117.380921°E		
Lever Frame. Wyalkatchem Station	16984		Grace Street	Wyalkatchem	31.18114°S 117.380902°E		
Loading Ramp and Crane Wyalkatchem	16985		Railway Terrace	Wyalkatchem	31.180604°S 117.380699°E		
Wyalkatchem Railway Barracks	16989		Grace Street	Wyalkatchem	31.181506°S 117.379858°E		
Wyalkatchem Railway Station	23931		Grace Street	Wyalkatchem	31.180987°S 117.380628°E		
