= Kununoppin =

- Town
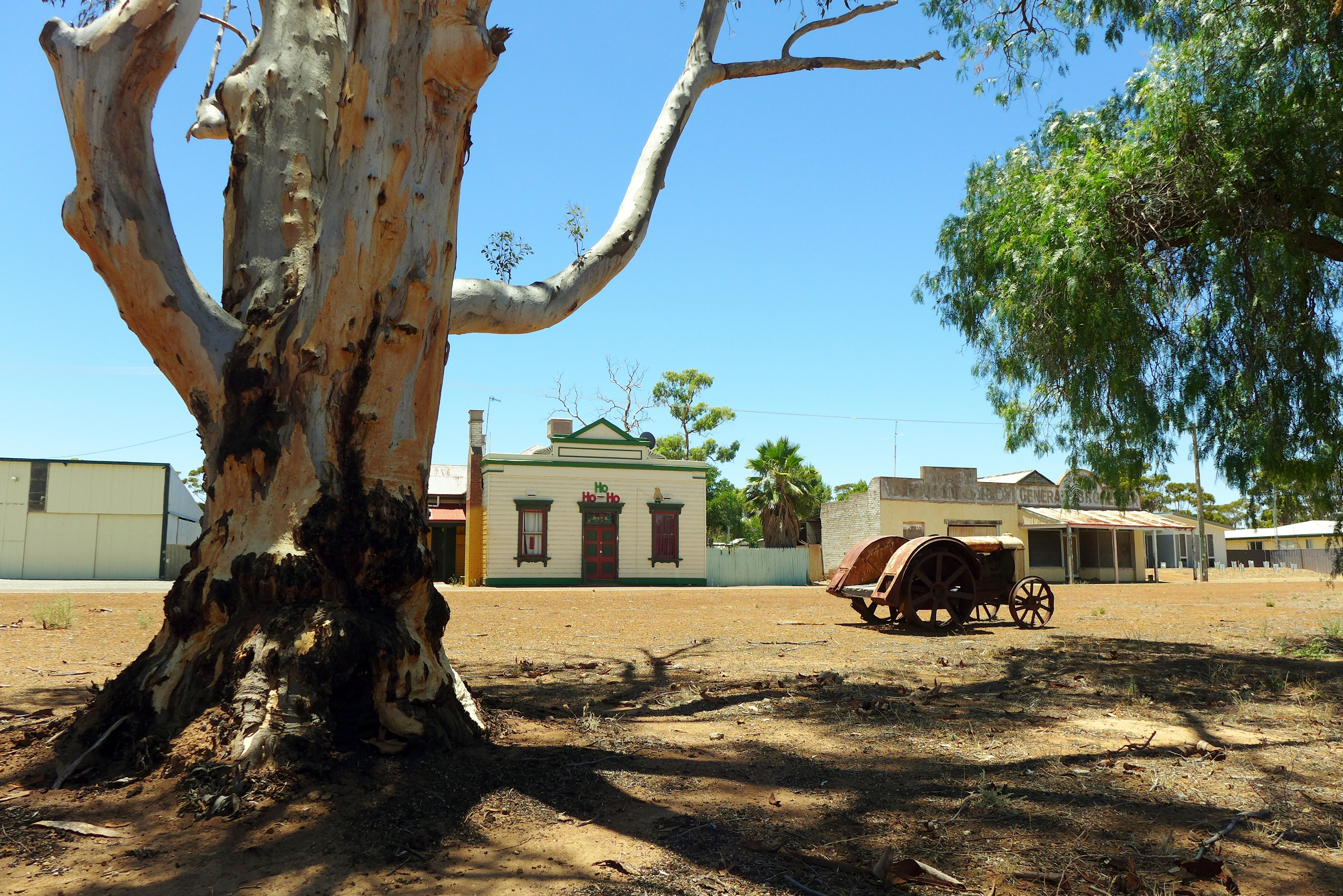
- Wilson Street, Kununoppin, 2014

- Coordinates: 31°07′0″S 117°55′0″E
- Country: Australia
- State: Western Australia
- LGA(s): Shire of Trayning
- Location: 257 km (160 mi) NE of Perth; 60 km (37 mi) NW of Merredin; 12 km (7.5 mi) E of Trayning
- Established: 1911

Government
  - State electorate(s): Central Wheatbelt
  - Federal division(s): Durack

Area
  - Total: 2.7 km^{2} (1.0 sq mi)

Population
  - Total(s): 49 (SAL 2021)
- Postcode: 6489

Kununoppin is a small town in the Wheatbelt region of Western Australia. The town is located on the Nungarin–Wyalkatchem Road and in the Shire of Trayning local government area, 257 kilometres (160 mi) north east of the state capital, Perth, Western Australia. At the 2006 census, Kununoppin had a population of 151.

The site of a railway siding on the Dowerin to Merredin railway line, Kununoppin was gazetted as a townsite in 1911. The town's name derives from the Aboriginal name for the surrounding area. The name was first rendered as "Coonoonoppin"—the revised spelling of "Kununoppin" was adopted to conform with the Royal Geographical Society standard orthography for Aboriginal place names. (See -up for further details).

In 1932 the Wheat Pool of Western Australia announced that the town would have two grain elevators, each fitted with an engine, installed at the railway siding.

The town—set in Salmon Gum woodland—features a series of tin sculptures. The sculptures are placed in various locations around the town.

The surrounding areas produce wheat and other cereal crops. The town is a receival site for Cooperative Bulk Handling.
