= List of shire presidents of Trayning =

The Shire of Trayning is a local government area in Western Australia. It was established on 30 June 1911 as the Korrelocking Road District, with a chairman as its head. It was renamed several times as a road district. With the passage of the Local Government Act 1960, it became the Shire of Trayning-Kununoppin-Yelbeni, with a shire president as its head. It was renamed to its present name on 10 September 1965.

== Road district chairmen ==
Chairman	Term
William L. R. Hall	1912
P. M. Dove	1912
T. Sutherland	1912–1916
L. B. Riley	1916–1918
F. C. Weyman	1918–1919
F. Ridgway	1920–1923
T. J. Appleyard	1923–1925
Donald Alexander Couper	1925–1946
G. M. Appleyard	1946–1949
J. M. O"Meara	1949–1952
H. Pope	1952–1953
William Donald Couper	1953–1960
B. S. Rance	1960–1961

== Shire presidents ==
Chairman	Term
B. S. Rance	1961–1965
P. T. Main	1965–1969
D. R. M. Mason	1969–1986
W. D. Couper	1986–1996
Trevor R. Lamond	1996–2013
Freda Tarr	2013–2017
Melanie Brown	2017–present
