= Acacia obtecta =

Scientific classification
- Kingdom: Plantae
- Clade: Tracheophytes
- Clade: Angiosperms
- Clade: Eudicots
- Clade: Rosids
- Order: Fabales
- Family: Fabaceae
- Subfamily: Caesalpinioideae
- Clade: Mimosoid clade
- Genus: Acacia
- Species: A. obtecta

Binomial name
- Acacia obtecta Maiden & Blakely
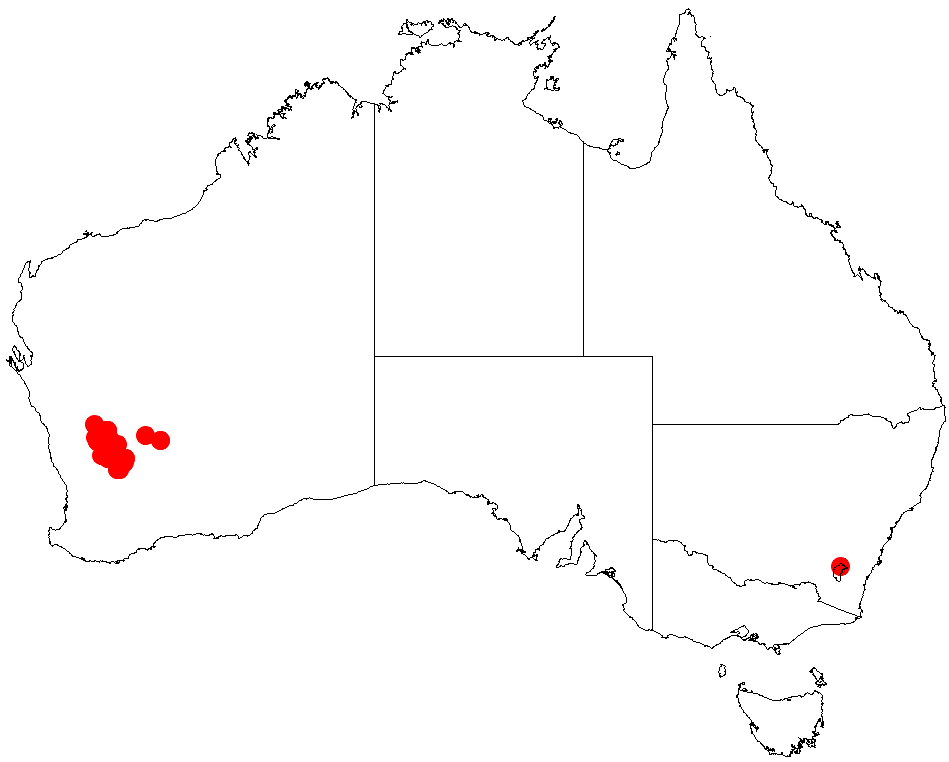
- Occurrence data from AVH

Synonyms
- Racosperma obtectum (Maiden & Blakely) Pedley

Species of legume

Acacia obtecta is a species of flowering plant in the family Fabaceae, and is endemic to a small area in the south-west of Western Australia. It is an inverted, cone-shaped shrub with glabrous branchlets, linear, straight to slightly curved phyllodes, spherical heads of golden yellow flowers and glabrous, leathery pods that resemble a string of beads.

== Description ==
Acacia obtecta is a bushy, rounded or inverted cone-shaped shrub that typically grows to a height of 1.5–3 m (4 ft 11 in – 9 ft 10 in) and has glabrous, slightly ribbed, pale grey branchlets. Its phyllodes are linear, straight to slightly curved, 70–100 mm (2.8–3.9 in) long, 4–6 mm (0.16–0.24 in) wide with a pointed tip and glabrous with three slightly raised veins on each face. The flowers are borne in one to four spherical heads in axils on phyllodes 3–5 mm (0.12–0.20 in) long, each head about 5 mm (0.20 in) in diameter with 20 to 36 golden yellow flowers. Flowering occurs from August to October, and the pods are up to 140 mm (5.5 in) long, 7–9 mm (0.28–0.35 in) wide, leathery and glabrous with a long stalk, resembling a string of beads. The seeds are broadly elliptic, 6–7.5 mm (0.24–0.30 in) long, mottled dark and light brown and lack an aril.

== Taxonomy ==
Acacia obtecta was first formally described in 1927 by Joseph Maiden and William Blakely in the Journal of the Royal Society of Western Australia. The specific epithet (obtecta) means 'covered over' or 'protected', referring to the smooth, greyish covering on the branchlets.

== Distribution and habitat ==
This species of wattle grows in red loam or clay and is confined to, but locally common, in the Paynes Find-Wubin-Kununoppin are, as well as the type locality at Lake Barlee, in the Avon Wheatbelt, Coolgardie, Murchison and Yalgoo bioregions of south-western Western Australia.

== See also ==
- List of Acacia species
