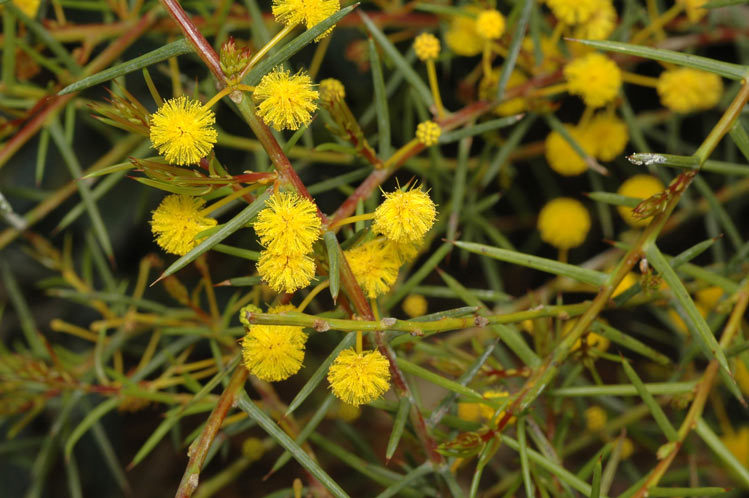
- In Kings Park

Conservation status
- Priority Three — Poorly Known Taxa (DEC)

Scientific classification
- Kingdom: Plantae
- Clade: Tracheophytes
- Clade: Angiosperms
- Clade: Eudicots
- Clade: Rosids
- Order: Fabales
- Family: Fabaceae
- Subfamily: Caesalpinioideae
- Clade: Mimosoid clade
- Genus: Acacia
- Species: A. campylophylla

Binomial name
- Acacia campylophylla Benth.
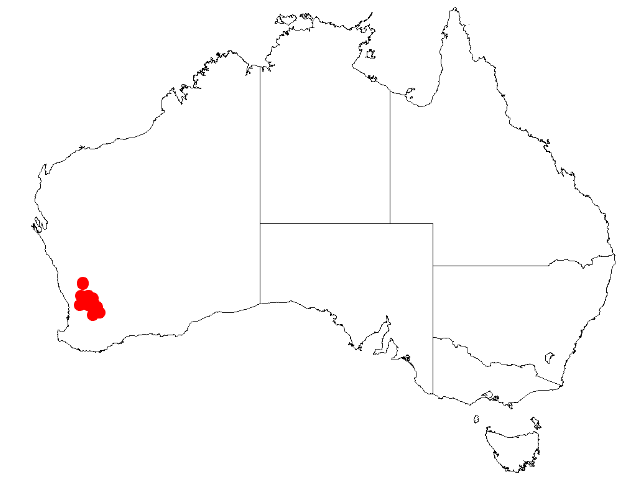
- Occurrence data from AVH

Synonyms
- Racosperma campylophyllum (Benth.) Pedley

= Acacia campylophylla =

Species of legume

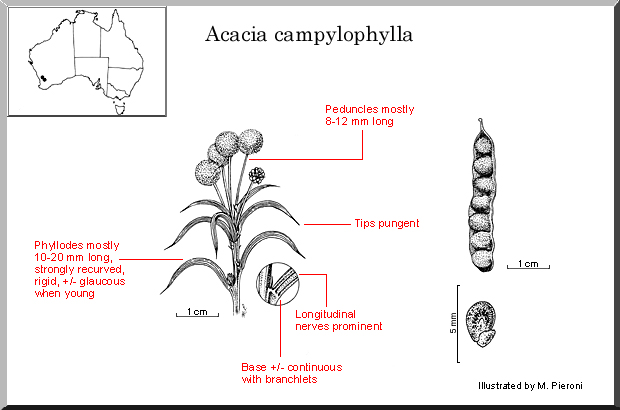
Illustration by Margaret Pieroni

Acacia campylophylla is a species of flowering plant in the family Fabaceae and is endemic to the south-west of Western Australia. It is a dense, rigid, spreading shrub with ribbed, glabrous branchlets, sharply-pointed phyllodes more or less continuous with the branchlets, spherical heads of yellow flowers, and narrowly oblong, more or less papery pods.

== Description ==
Acacia campylophylla is a dense, rigid, spreading shrub that typically grows to a height of 10–60 cm (3.9–23.6 in) and has ribbed, glabrous branchlets sometimes covered with a white, powdery bloom near the ends. The phyllodes are more or less continuous with the branchlets, strongly turned down and sharply pointed, 10–20 mm (0.39–0.79 in) long, 1.0–1.5 mm (0.039–0.059 in) wide and glaucous at first and with 8 prominent veins. There are spiny stipules 0.5–1.5 mm (0.020–0.059 in) long at the base of the phyllodes. The flowers are borne in a spherical head in axils on a peduncle 8–12 mm (0.31–0.47 in) long. Each head is 4–6 mm (0.16–0.24 in) in diameter with 26 to 31 yellow flowers. Flowering occurs from about July to August, and the pods are more or less papery, narrowly oblong, up to 37 mm (1.5 in) long, 4.0–7.5 mm (0.16–0.30 in) wide and strongly raised over the seeds. The seeds are mottled tan, broadly elliptic, about 2.5 mm (0.098 in) long with a crested aril.

== Taxonomy ==
Acacia campylophylla was first formally described in 1855 by the botanist George Bentham in the journal Linnaea from specimens collected by James Drummond. The specific epithet (campylophylla) means 'bent or curved leaves'.

== Distribution and habitat ==
This species of wattle grows in lateritic, gravelly soil and is found between Bolgart and Wyalkatchem and south to near Corrigin in the Avon Wheatbelt and Jarrah Forest bioregions of south-western Western Australia.

== Conservation status ==
Acacia campylophylla is listed as "Priority Three" by the Government of Western Australia Department of Biodiversity, Conservation and Attractions meaning that it is poorly known and known from only a few locations but is not under imminent threat.

== See also ==
- List of Acacia species
