= Gabbin, Western Australia =

Gabbin
- Town
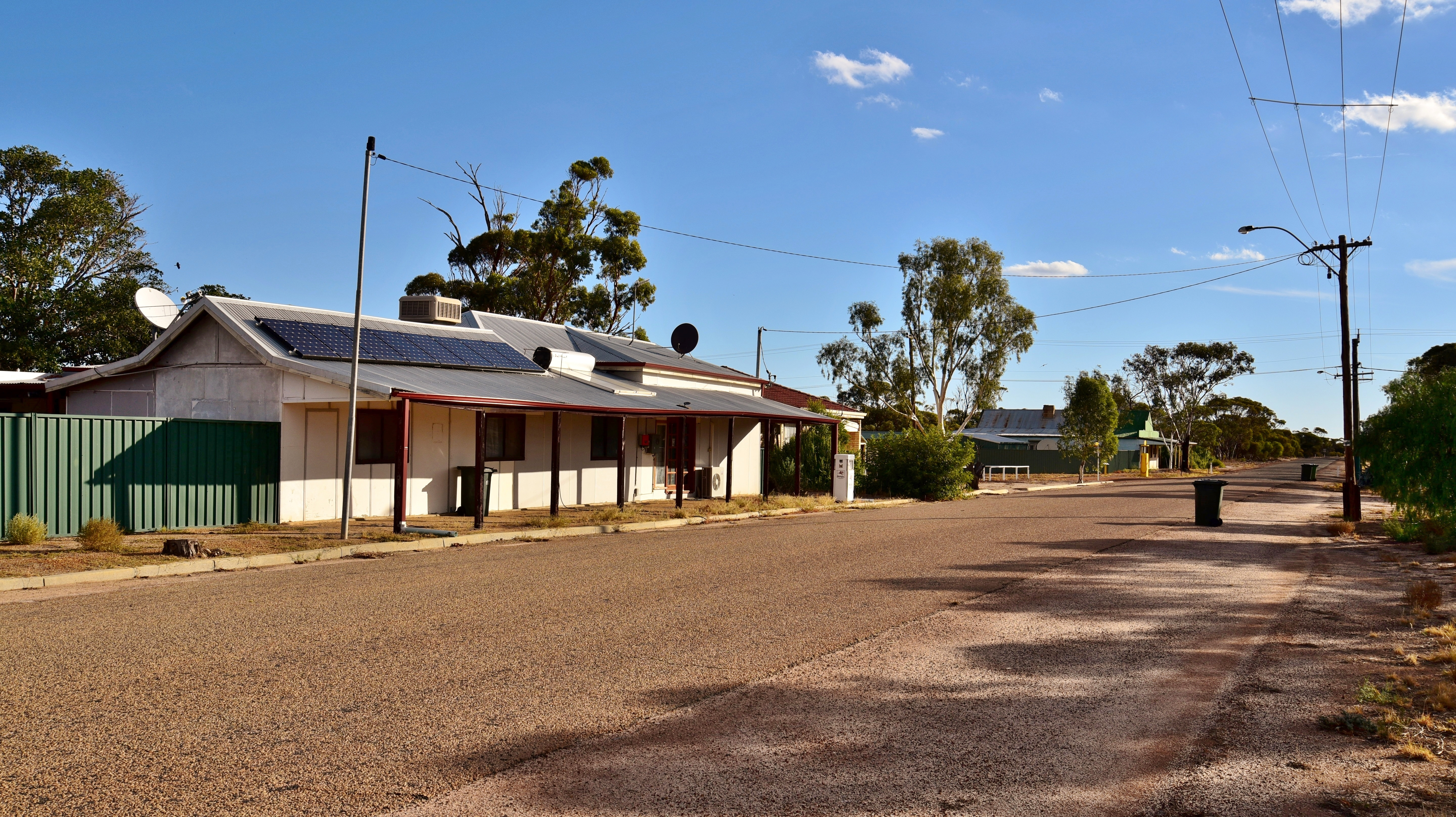
- Hammond Street, Gabbin, 2018

- Coordinates: 30.8°S 117.683°E
- Country: Australia
- State: Western Australia
- LGA(s): Shire of Mount Marshall
- Location: 255 km (158 mi) north east of Perth; 19 km (12 mi) east of Koorda; 95 km (59 mi) north west of Merredin
- Established: 1918

Government
  - State electorate(s): Central Wheatbelt
  - Federal division(s): Durack

Area
  - Total: 806.9 km^{2} (311.5 sq mi)
- Elevation: 343 m (1,125 ft)

Population
  - Total(s): 44 (SAL 2021)
- Postcode: 6476

Gabbin is a small town in the Wheatbelt region of Western Australia.

The townsite originally served as a railway station for the Wyalkatchem to Mount Marshall line that was constructed through the area in 1913. The townsite was gazetted in 1918 and was named after the railway station.

In 1932 the Wheat Pool of Western Australia announced that the town would have two grain elevators, each fitted with an engine, installed at the railway siding. Work on the bulk handling depot commenced late in 1933.
