= Calytrix gracilis =

Scientific classification
- Kingdom: Plantae
- Clade: Tracheophytes
- Clade: Angiosperms
- Clade: Eudicots
- Clade: Rosids
- Order: Myrtales
- Family: Myrtaceae
- Genus: Calytrix
- Species: C. gracilis

Binomial name
- Calytrix gracilis Benth.

Synonyms
- Calycothrix gracilis (Benth.) F.Muell.; Calythrix gracilis Benth. orth. var.

Species of flowering plant

Calytrix gracilis is a species of flowering plant in the myrtle family Myrtaceae and is endemic to the south-west of Western Australia. It is a glabrous shrub with linear leaves and scattered violet to deep blue flowers, with about 65 to 125 white to yellow stamens in several rows, becoming reddish as they age.

== Description ==
Calytrix gracilis is a glabrous shrub that typically grows to a height of 0.2–1 m (7.9 in – 3 ft 3.4 in). Its leaves are spreading to erect, linear, 2–8 mm (0.079–0.315 in) long and 0.4–0.6 mm (0.016–0.024 in) wide on a petiole 0.3–1 mm (0.012–0.039 in) long. The flowers are scattered, on a peduncle 6.5–9.5 mm (0.26–0.37 in) long with narrowly egg-shaped lobes 2.0–3.5 mm (0.079–0.138 in) long, the narrower end towards the base. The floral tube is 8–11 mm (0.31–0.43 in) long, fused to the style and has ten ribs. The sepals are joined for up to 0.8 mm (0.031 in) at the base, the lobes more or less circular to broadly elliptic, 2.25–3.0 mm (0.089–0.118 in) long and 1.8–2.4 mm (0.071–0.094 in) wide with an awn up to 11 mm (0.43 in) long. The petals are violet to deep blue, broadly elliptic, 6.0–7.5 mm (0.24–0.30 in) long and 4.0–4.5 mm (0.16–0.18 in) wide with about 65 to 125 white to yellow stamens in up to six rows, becoming reddish-purple as they age. Flowering occurs from August to October.

== Taxonomy ==
Calytrix gracilis was first formally described in 1867 by George Bentham in Flora Australiensis from specimens collected near the Murchison River by Augustus Oldfield. The specific epithet (gracilis) means 'thin', or 'slender'.

== Distribution and habitat ==
This species of Calytrix is found on sandy ridges, on breakaways and among sandy outcrops between the Kalbarri district and the Wongan Hills-Trayning districts in the Avon Wheatbelt, Geraldton Sandplains, Jarrah Forest and Swan Coastal Plain bioregions of south-western Western Australia where, it grows on sand or sand-loam soils over laterite.
