= Benjaberring, Western Australia =

Benjaberring Western Australia
- Coordinates: 31°09′S 117°17′E
- Population: 23 (SAL 2021)
- Established: 1910
- Postcode(s): 6463
- Elevation: 355 m (1,165 ft)
- Location: 199 km (124 mi) north east of Perth; 10 km (6 mi) west of Wyalkatchem; 24 km (15 mi) east of Dowerin
- LGA(s): Shire of Wyalkatchem
- State electorate(s): Central Wheatbelt
- Federal division(s): Durack

Benjaberring is a small town in the Wheatbelt region of Western Australia located in the Shire of Wyalcatchem. The name of the town originates from the Aboriginal name of a nearby water source. The name of the area first appears on charts in 1846; the town site was first declared as Benjabbering in 1910, but the spelling was changed to Benjaberring in 1911 to more accurately reflect the correct pronunciation. In 1927 - the wheat statistics were showing over 2,000 tons annually for the years 1924/1925, and 1925/1926.

In 1932 it was the location of a railway siding and was one of five bulk grain receival locations that was the beginning of the Cooperative Bulk Handling organisation now known as the CBH Group.
