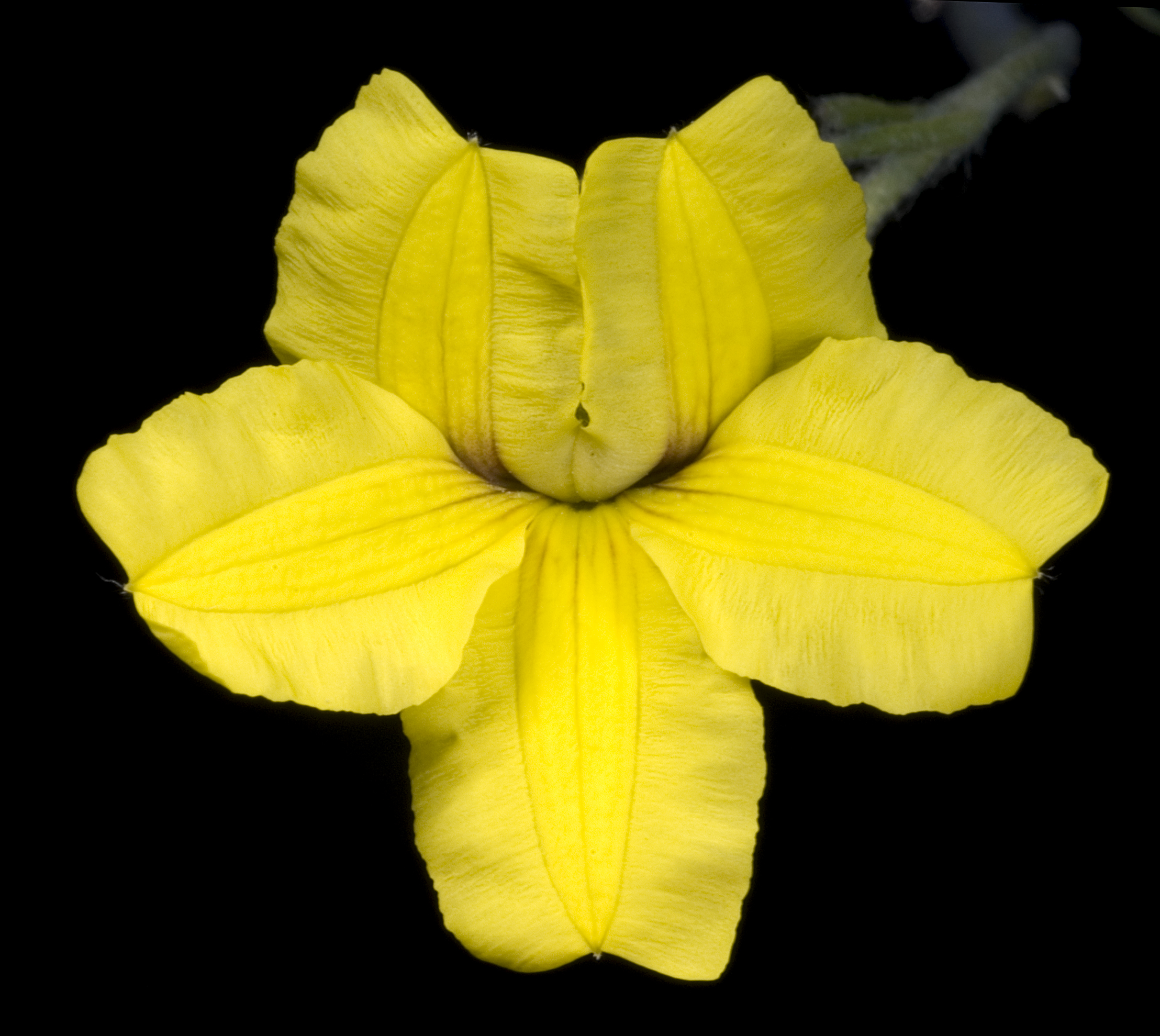

Scientific classification
- Kingdom: Plantae
- Clade: Tracheophytes
- Clade: Angiosperms
- Clade: Eudicots
- Clade: Asterids
- Order: Asterales
- Family: Goodeniaceae
- Genus: Goodenia
- Species: G. convexa

Binomial name
- Goodenia convexa Carolin

= Goodenia convexa =

Species of plant

Goodenia convexa is a species of flowering plant in the family Goodeniaceae and is endemic to Western Australia. It is a low-lying herb with egg-shaped to lance-shaped, usually toothed leaves mostly at the base of the plant, and racemes of yellow flowers.

== Description ==
Goodenia convexa is a low-lying herb with more or less hairy stems to 50 cm (20 in) long. The leaves are mostly at the base of the plant, lance-shaped to egg-shaped with the narrower end towards the base, 30–120 mm (1.2–4.7 in) long and 4–25 mm (0.16–0.98 in) wide, usually with teeth on the edges. The flowers are arranged in loose racemes up to 50 mm (2.0 in) long on a peduncle 10–60 mm (0.39–2.36 in) long with linear to lance-shaped bracteoles at the base, each flower on a pedicel 30–50 mm (1.2–2.0 in) long. The sepals are narrow elliptic, 5–8 mm (0.20–0.31 in) long, the corolla yellow, 18–25 mm (0.71–0.98 in) long. The lower lobes of the corolla are 15–18 mm (0.59–0.71 in) long with wings 2–3 mm (0.079–0.118 in) wide. Flowering mainly occurs from August to November and the fruit is an oval to cylindrical capsule 10–15 mm (0.39–0.59 in) long.

== Taxonomy and naming ==
Goodenia convexa was first formally described in 1990 by Roger Charles Carolin in the journal Telopea from material collected by James Drummond near the Swan River.

== Distribution and habitat ==
This goodenia grows in sandy heath and woodland between the Hill River, Tone River and Cowcowing in the south-west of Western Australia.

== Conservation status ==
Goodenia convexa is classified as "not threatened" by the Government of Western Australia Department of Parks and Wildlife.
