= Leioproctus ibex =

Scientific classification
- Kingdom: Animalia
- Phylum: Arthropoda
- Clade: Pancrustacea
- Class: Insecta
- Order: Hymenoptera
- Family: Colletidae
- Genus: Leioproctus
- Species: L. ibex

Binomial name
- Leioproctus ibex (Cockerell, 1914)

Synonyms
- Paracolletes ibex Cockerell, 1914

Species of bee

Leioproctus ibex, or Leioproctus (Leioproctus) ibex, is a species of bee in the family Colletidae and subfamily Colletinae. It is endemic to Australia. It was described by British-American entomologist Theodore Dru Alison Cockerell in 1914.

== Description ==
Male body length is 8 mm. Colouration is mainly black, with white and black hair.

== Distribution and habitat ==
The species occurs in both western and eastern Australia. Published localities include Wyalkatchem, Western Australia and Windsor, Victoria.

== Behaviour ==
The adults are flying mellivores.
