= Korrelocking, Western Australia =

Town in southwestern Australia

Korrelocking Western Australia
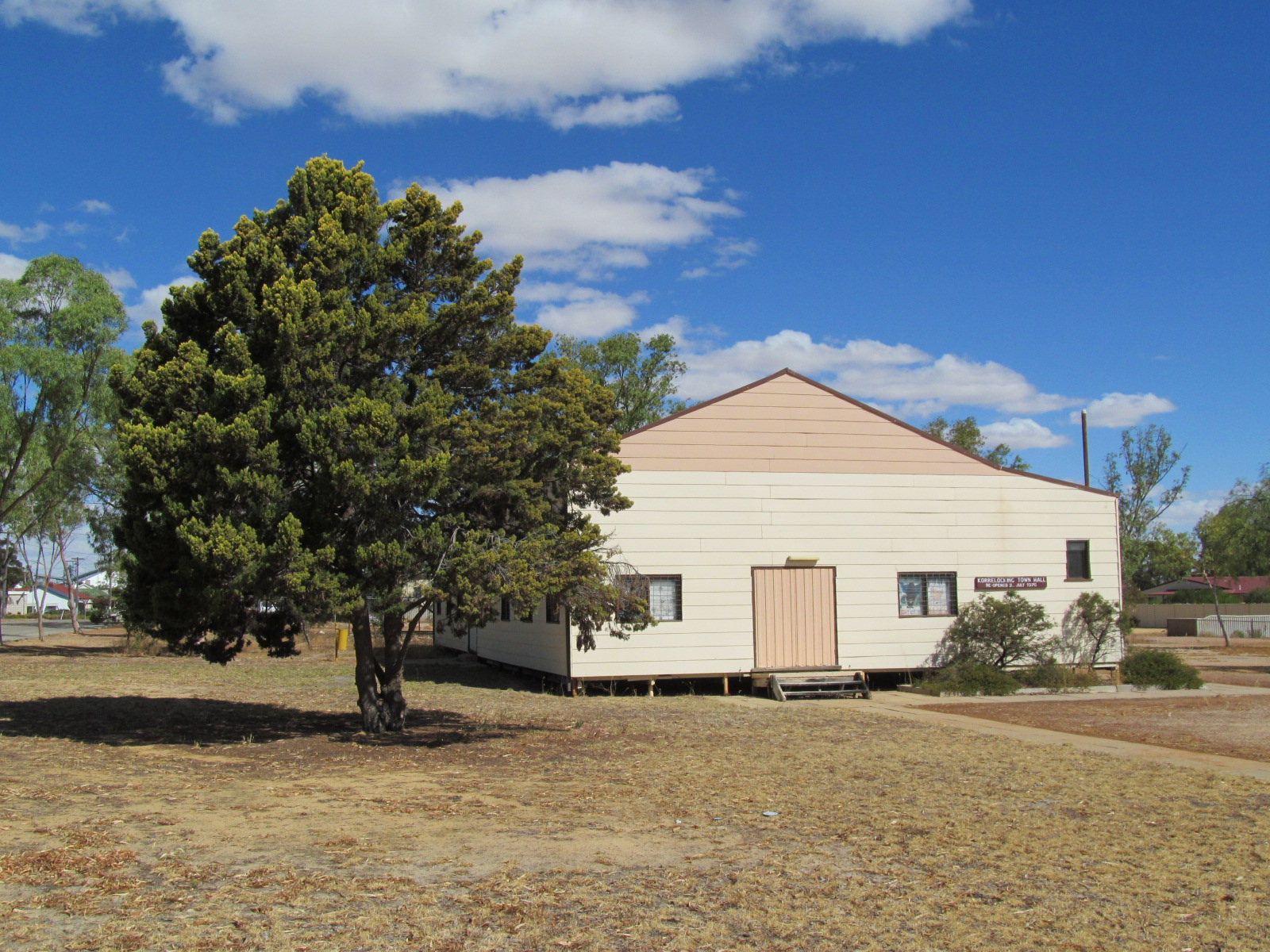
- Korrelocking town hall, 2013

- Coordinates: 31°12′S 117°28′E
- Population: 58 (SAL 2021)
- Established: 1911
- Postcode(s): 6485
- Elevation: 343 m (1,125 ft)
- Location: 201 km (125 mi) north east of Perth; 10 km (6 mi) east of Wyalkatchem
- LGA(s): Shire of Wyalkatchem
- State electorate(s): Central Wheatbelt
- Federal division(s): Durack

Korrelocking is a small town situated between Wyalkatchem and Trayning in the Wheatbelt region of Western Australia. At the 2006 census, Korrelocking had a population of 76.

During the construction of the Merredin to Dowerin railway line the government decided to establish a station in the area. The Yuragin progress association petitioned for a townsite to be declared at the station.

The town was gazetted in 1911, shortly before the opening of the railway line.

In 1932 the Wheat Pool of Western Australia announced that the town would have two grain elevators, each fitted with an engine, installed at the railway siding, which in effect saw Korrelocking as one of the first five bulk wheat locations on the Western Australian Government Railways network, and a site of the beginning of bulk wheat handling in Western Australia.

The name of the town is an Aboriginal word for a nearby water well that had been recorded when the area had been surveyed in 1892. The meaning of the name is not known.

A bioblitz was conducted in 2012 in a bush reserve between Korrelocking and Wyalkatchem. 54 people took part and collected samples of scorpions, pseudoscorpions, isopods, spiders. and centipedes, including some new species.
