= Cowcowing, Western Australia =

Cowcowing
- Town
- Interactive map of Cowcowing
- Coordinates: 31°00′S 117°27′E
- Country: Australia
- State: Western Australia
- LGA: Shire of Wyalkatchem
- Location: 215 km (134 mi) north east of Perth; 21 km (13 mi) north east of Wyalkatchem
- Established: 1919

Government
  - State electorate: Central Wheatbelt
  - Federal division: Durack
- Elevation: 317 m (1,040 ft)

Population
  - Total: 19 (SAL 2021)
- Postcode: 6485

Cowcowing is a small town located just off the Koorda–Wyalkatchem road 215 kilometres (134 mi) from Perth, 24 kilometres (15 mi) south of Koorda and 23 kilometres (14 mi) north of Wyalkatchem in the Wheatbelt region of Western Australia.

The town originated as a railway siding on the Wyalkatchem to Southern Cross railway line and was later gazetted as a townsite on 7 November 1919. The name of the town is Aboriginal in origin and was first recorded by explorers in 1854. The name of the nearby lake recorded as "Gow gow eeh lake" has now been changed to Cowcowing Lake; the meaning of the name remains unknown.

The town is a Cooperative Bulk Handling receival site.

On 2 October 2022, the 2022 Cowcowing Lakes helicopter crash occurred near Cowcowing Lake, killing two people.

== Notable residents ==
- Captain Hugo Throssell (1884–1933), awarded Victoria Cross at Gallipoli
