= Koorda, Western Australia =

Koorda
- Town
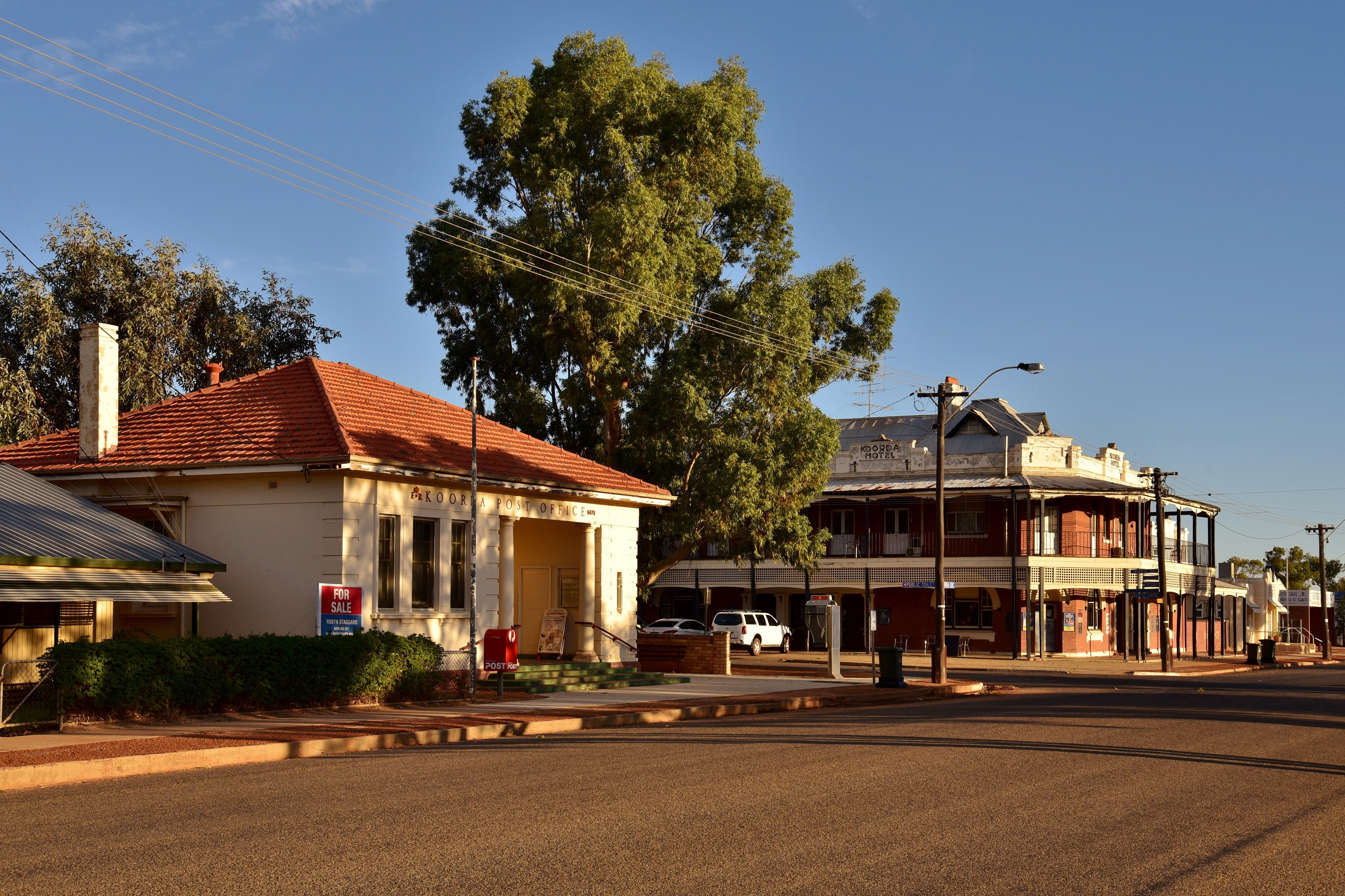
- Railway Street, Koorda, 2018

- Interactive map of Koorda
- Coordinates: 30.83°S 117.48°E
- Country: Australia
- State: Western Australia
- LGA: Shire of Koorda
- Location: 236 km (147 mi) NE of Perth; 43 km (27 mi) N of Wyalkatchem; 36 km (22 mi) W of Bencubbin
- Established: 1910s

Government
  - State electorate: Central Wheatbelt
  - Federal division: Durack

Area
  - Total: 9.6 km^{2} (3.7 sq mi)
- Elevation: 307 m (1,007 ft)

Population
  - Total: 213 (SAL 2021)
- Postcode: 6475

Koorda is a town in the north eastern Wheatbelt region of Western Australia, approximately 236 kilometres (147 mi) east of Perth and 43 kilometres (27 mi) north of Wyalkatchem at the northeastern end of the Cowcowing Lakes. It is the main town in the Shire of Koorda. At the 2016 census Koorda had a population of 414. The surrounding areas produce wheat and other cereal crops. The town is a receival site for Cooperative Bulk Handling.

== History ==
In 1913 the government decided to construct a railway line from Wyalkatchem to Mount Marshall (southeast of Bencubbin), and the Central Cowcowing Progress Association requested that land be set aside for a townsite at the proposed siding in this area. In 1914 the Jirimbi and Mulji Progress Association again requested a townsite here, and also in 1914 the proposed siding here was named Koorda at the suggestion of J Hope, the Chief Draftsman in the Lands Department. Hope took the name from a list of words obtained from a Noongar in the Margaret River area, the meaning being given as a "married person". Problems regarding resumption of land for the townsite and the exact siting of the siding meant that the townsite was not gazetted until 1917.

In 1932 the Wheat Pool of Western Australia announced that the town would have two grain elevators, each fitted with an engine, installed at the railway siding.

== Politics ==
Polling place statistics are shown below showing the votes from Koorda in the federal and state elections as indicated.

2004 federal election Source: AEC
Liberal	52.2%
The Nationals	22.3%
Labor	15.2%
One Nation	2.68%
Greens	2.68%

2005 state election Source: WAEC
The Nationals	54.1%
Liberal	25.3%
Labor	11.1%
One Nation	4.29%
Greens	2.15%

2001 federal election Source: AEC
Liberal	59.0%
One Nation	14.1%
The Nationals	11.8%
Labor	10.8%
Independent	1.64%

2001 state election Source: WAEC
The Nationals	52.5%
One Nation	28.2%
Labor	12.3%
Independent	2.54%
Greens	2.17%

1998 federal election Source: AEC
Liberal	49.8%
One Nation	15.6%
The Nationals	14.0%
Labor	10.6%
Australia First	5.91%

1996 state election Source: WAEC
The Nationals	81.1%
Labor	18.9%
