= Shire of Wyalkatchem =

Local government area in the Wheatbelt region of Western Australia

Coordinates: 31°10′37″S 117°22′59″E

- Local government area
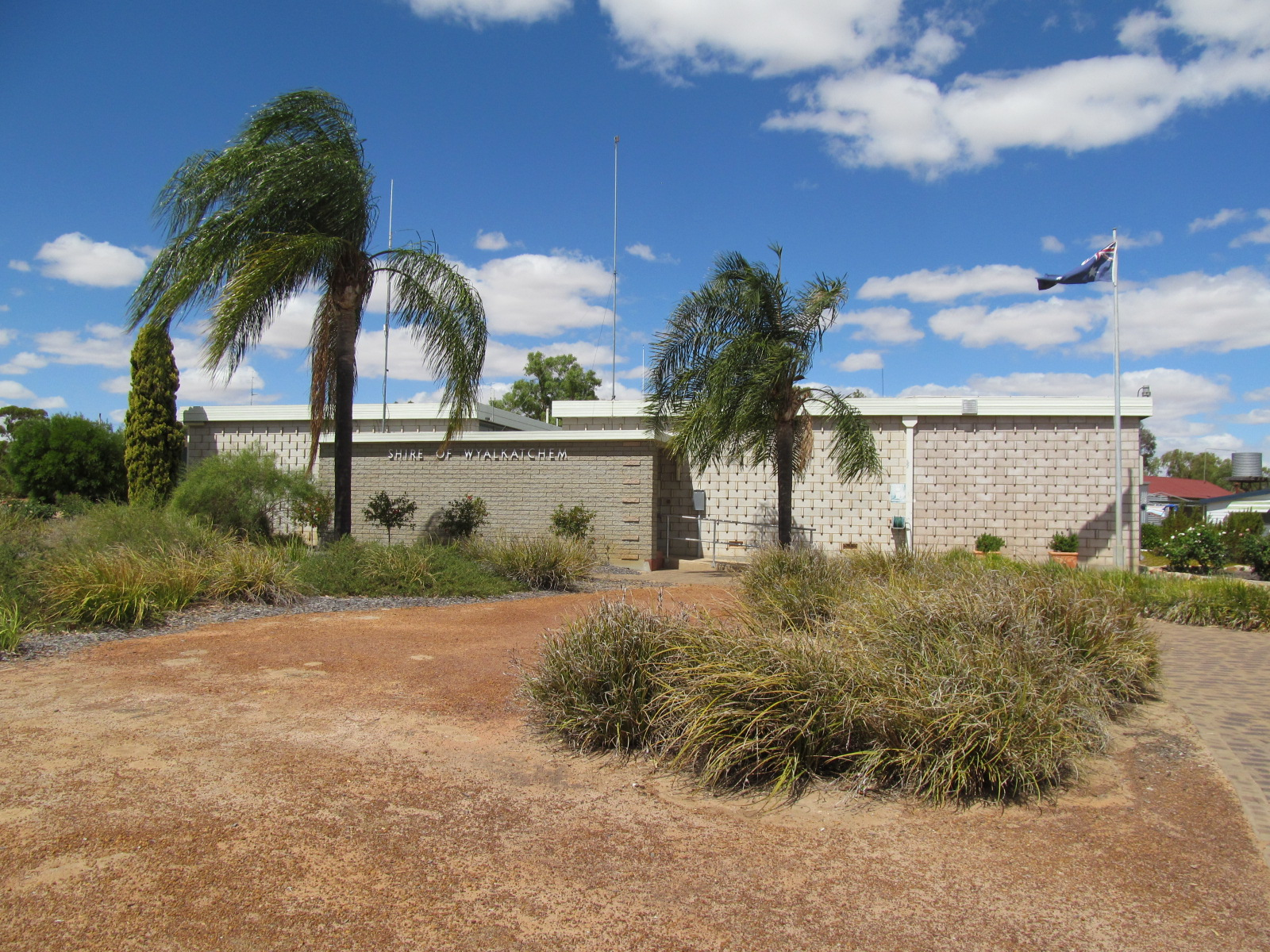
- The Wyalkatchem Shire offices

- Interactive map of Shire of Wyalkatchem
- Country: Australia
- State: Western Australia
- Region: Wheatbelt
- Established: 1920
- Council seat: Wyalkatchem

Government
  - Shire President: Quentin Davies
  - State electorate: Central Wheatbelt
  - Federal division: Durack

Area
  - Total: 1,595.4 km^{2} (616.0 sq mi)

Population
  - Total: 470 (LGA 2021)
- Website: Shire of Wyalkatchem
LGAs around Shire of Wyalkatchem
Wongan Ballidu	Koorda	Mount Marshall
Dowerin	Shire of Wyalkatchem	Trayning
Cunderdin	Tammin	Kellerberrin

The Shire of Wyalkatchem is a local government area located in the Wheatbelt region of Western Australia. Its seat of government is the town of Wyalkatchem, about 190 kilometres (118 mi) northeast of Perth, the state capital.

== History ==
On 18 June 1920, the Wyalkatchem Road District was created out of land previously administered by the Ninghan and Dowerin Road Boards. On 1 July 1961, it became the Shire of Wyalkatchem under the Local Government Act 1960, which reformed all remaining road districts into shires.

== Wards ==
The shire has no wards, and seven councillors. The shire president is elected from amongst the councillors.

== Towns and localities ==
The towns and localities of the Shire of Wyalkatchem with population and size figures based on the most recent Australian census:

Suburb	Population	Area	Map
Benjaberring	23 (SAL 2021)	174.9 km^{2} (67.5 sq mi)	
Cowcowing	19 (SAL 2021)	235.3 km^{2} (90.8 sq mi)	
Korrelocking	58 (SAL 2021)	451.4 km^{2} (174.3 sq mi)	
Nalkain	4 (SAL 2021)	75.3 km^{2} (29.1 sq mi)	
Nembudding	12 (SAL 2021)	146.2 km^{2} (56.4 sq mi)	
Wyalkatchem	358 (SAL 2021)	511.4 km^{2} (197.5 sq mi)	

== Population ==
Historical population

Year	Pop.	±% p.a.
1921	1,218	—
1933	1,533	+1.94%
1947	1,094	−2.38%
1954	1,235	+1.75%
1961	1,383	+1.63%
1966	1,252	−1.97%
1971	1,113	−2.33%
1976	1,005	−2.02%
1981	954	−1.04%

Year	Pop.	±% p.a.
1986	786	−3.80%
1991	704	−2.18%
1996	628	−2.26%
2001	661	+1.03%
2006	564	−3.12%
2011	523	−1.50%
2016	516	−0.27%
2021	470	−1.85%

== Heritage-listed places ==
As of 2023, 133 places are heritage-listed in the Shire of Wyalkatchem, of which ten are on the State Register of Heritage Places.
