= CBH grain receival points =

Grain receival points in Western Australia

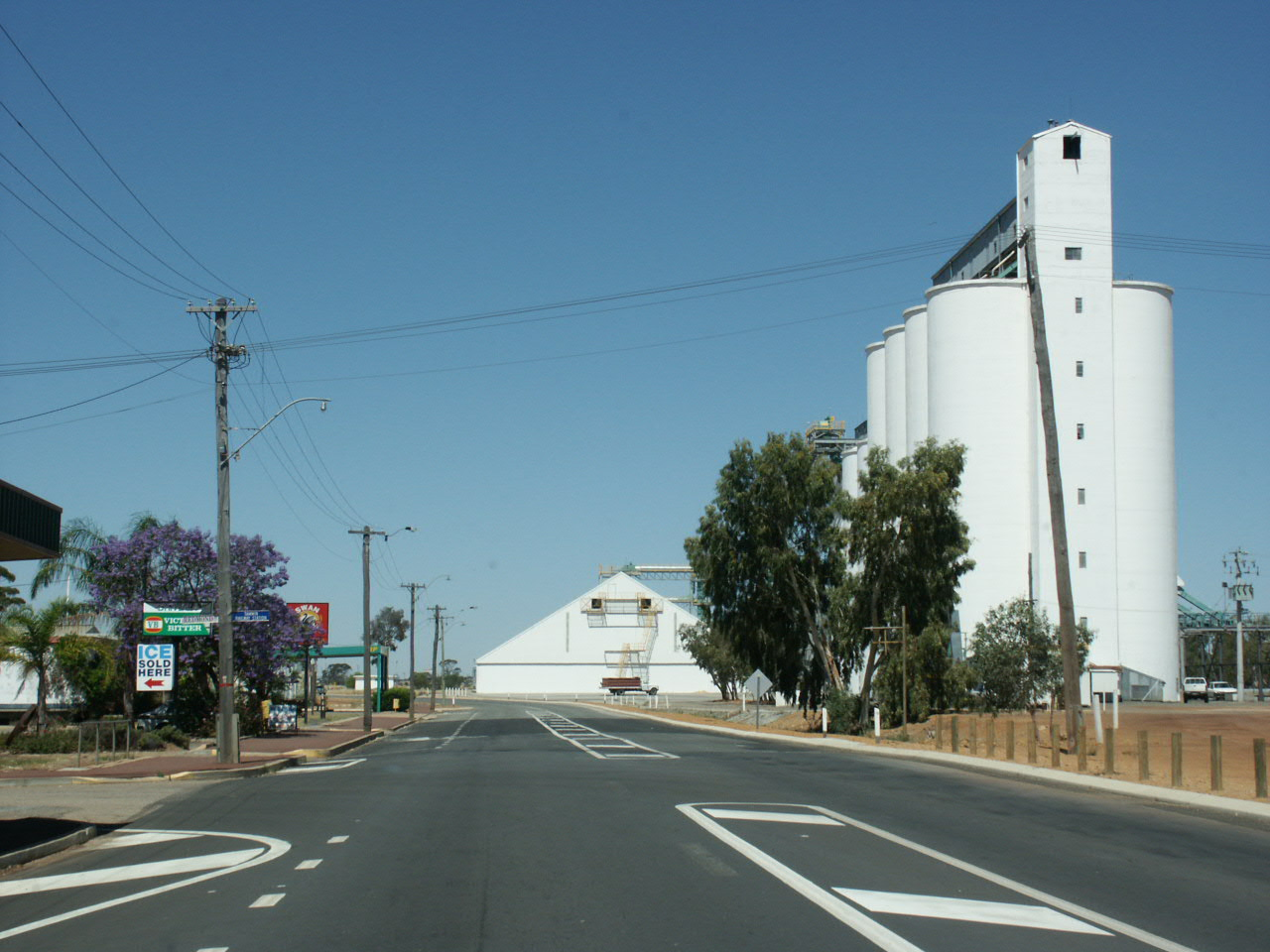
Tammin wheat bins – older style storage on left, larger on right

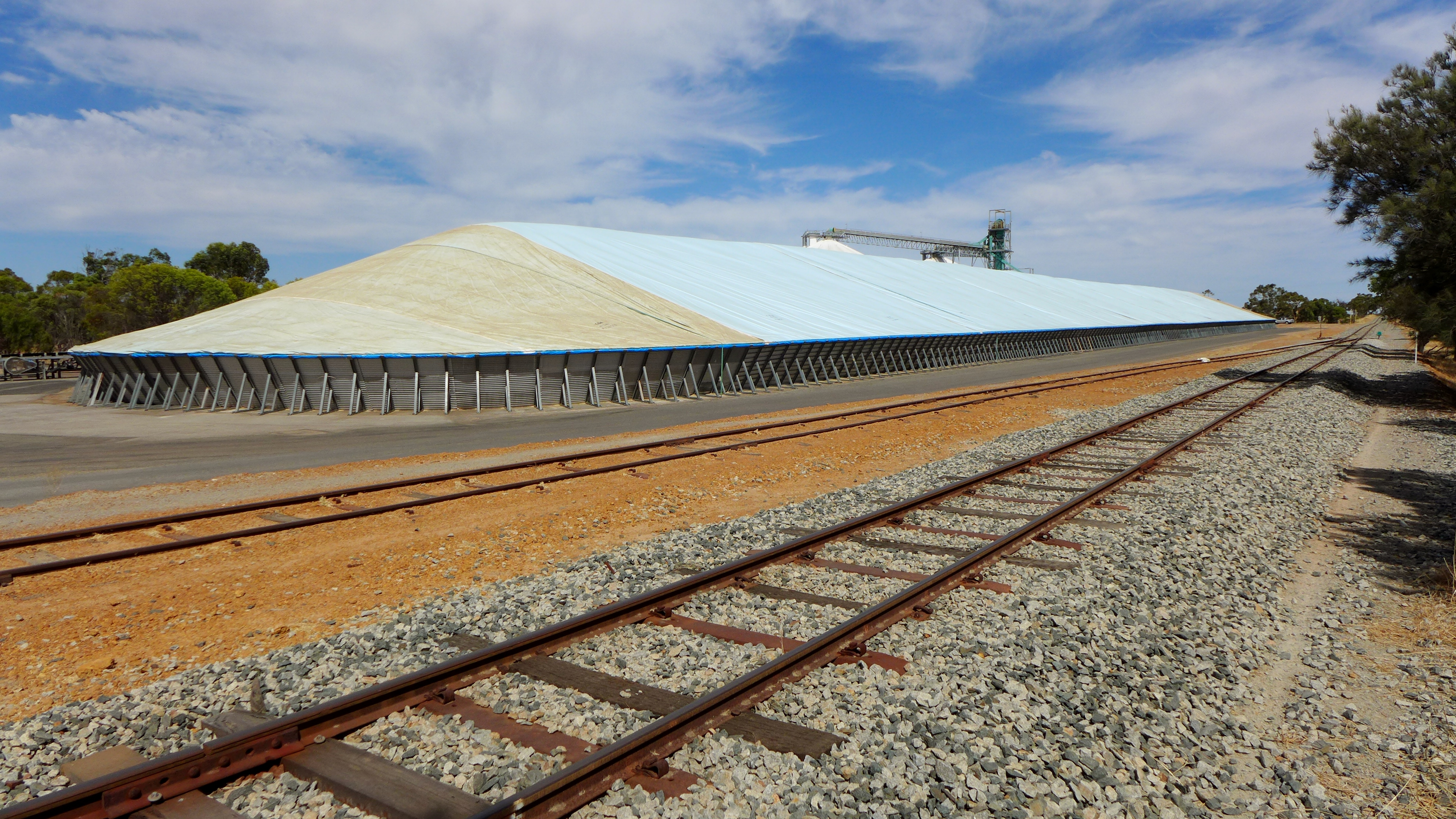
An open topped wheat bin (with covers attached) at Calingiri

CBH grain receival points (also known as the bins or wheat bins in local popular usage) are grain silos spread around Western Australia, operated by CBH Group. They are primarily in the wheatbelt region, and historically they have been linked with the wheatbelt railway lines, and the transport of grain to ports for export.

== Public art ==
The range of available bins or grain silos have taken on identity as large public art works in the 2010s in the Public Silo Trail, with three sections to the trail identified:

The Northern Trail

Northam
Merredin

The "Central Heart" Trail – involving

Katanning
Pingrup
Newdegate

The "Wave to wave" Trail – involving

Ravensthorpe
Albany

== Beginnings ==
The earlier bins were made at the time of the change from wheat transport in bags, to bulk operations – and at the time of the creation of the CBH Group in 1933.

The first five bins or grain receival points were located at Western Australian Government Railways sidings at:

- Benjaberring
- Korrelocking
- Nembudding
- Trayning
- Yelbeni

Due to their size, many of the storage bins were significant landmarks on the landscape in the agricultural communities of Western Australia.

== Deregulation and competition ==
In 2012, the Australian federal government deregulated the grain market in Australia.

In 2013, after 80 years of operation without competition, grain storage and transport in the Great Southern region has another operator due to a separate grain operation at Albany.

== Hierarchy ==
In earlier years the districts in the CBH system were known as "Directors" Districts.

By 2011, the Western Australian wheatbelt operations of CBH was split up into 12 management zone areas, with a set of locations in each zone with management offices, port terminals, and transfer depots identified.

== Geraldton Port zone ==
The Geraldton Port zone is served by two areas – one based in Geraldton, and the second based in Morawa.

=== Area 1 ===
- Geraldton as the main office, and Port Terminal

The primary receival sites for this zone are:

- Northampton
- Mullewa
- Mingenew

The secondary receival sites for this zone are:

- Binnu
- Canna
- Moonyoonooka
- Wongoondy

The closed receival sites for this zone are:-

- Pindar – east of Mullewa
- Sullivan – south of Mullewa

Historically, in this area there were also 1933 Type installation receival points at:

- Balla
- Ogilvie
- Naraling
- Wilroy
- Tardun

=== Area 2 ===
- Morawa

== Kwinana Port zone ==
- Kwinana

=== Area 3 ===
- Wongan Hills

=== Area 4 ===
- Koorda

=== Area 5 ===
- Merredin

=== Area 6 ===
- Avon ( Northam )

=== Area 7 ===
- Corrigin

== Albany Port zone ==
- Albany

=== Area 8 ===
- Lake Grace

=== Area 9 ===
- Katanning

=== Area 10 ===
- Albany office

== Esperance Port zone ==
- Esperance

=== Area 11 ===
- Esperance office

=== Area 12 ===
- Esperance office

== Grain storage types ==
Most grain receival points in the wheatbelt have combinations of historic structures that are still utilised, and new structures. Where the older structures tend to be next to, or aligned with the railway lines where they were built, many sites have extended grounds. As a consequence, identifying the types of silo/containers at some sites may uncover up to three or four different structures at the one location. Brookton for example has at least three different types present on the CBH property.

== Grain receival points ==
Total numbers of receival points in the system from the founding in 1932 to 1999 – the peak number occurring in 1965-1967:

- 1932/33 5
- 1933/34 53
- 1936/37 103
- 1937/38 136
- 1938/39 174
- 1953/54 267
- 1954/55 271
- 1955/56 273
- 1956/57 278
- 1957/58 276
- 1965/66 305
- 1966/67 305
- 1967/68 305
- 1968/69 300
- 1969/70 300
- 1978/79 214
- 1979/80 212
- 1980/81 210
- 1981/82 206
- 1982/83 196
- 1994/95 196
- 1995/96 196
- 1996/97 197
- 1997/98 198
- 1998/99 198
