= Shire of Trayning =

Local government area in the Wheatbelt region of Western Australia

Coordinates: 31°06′43″S 117°47′31″E

- Local government area
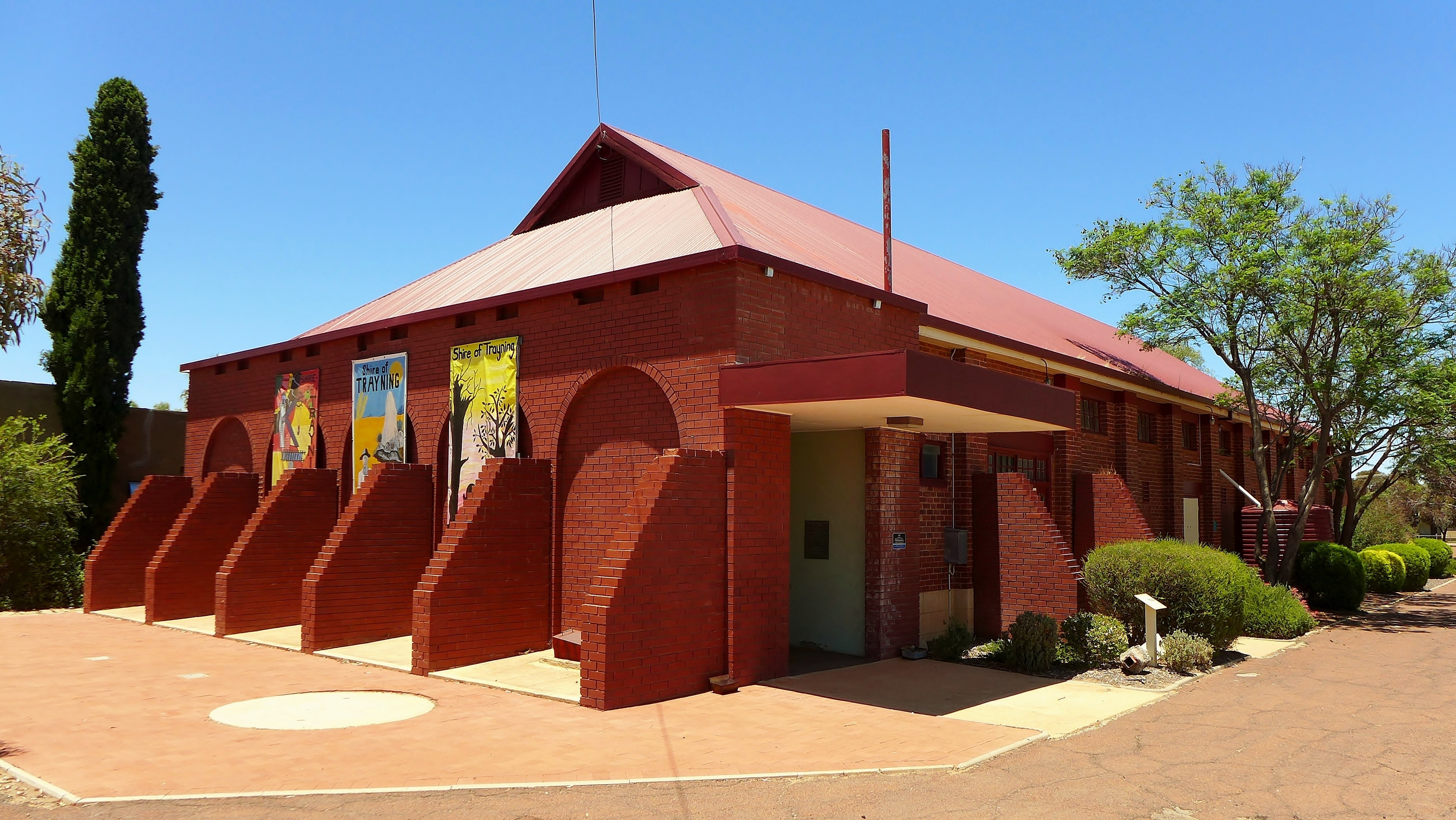
- Trayning Town Hall, 2014

- Interactive map of Shire of Trayning
- Country: Australia
- State: Western Australia
- Region: Wheatbelt
- Established: 1912
- Council seat: Trayning

Government
  - Shire President: Melanie Brown
  - State electorate: Central Wheatbelt
  - Federal division: Durack

Area
  - Total: 1,651.2 km^{2} (637.5 sq mi)

Population
  - Total: 298 (LGA 2021)
- Website: Shire of Trayning
LGAs around Shire of Trayning
Koorda	Mount Marshall	Mukinbudin
Wyalkatchem	Shire of Trayning	Nungarin
Tammin	Kellerberrin	Merredin

The Shire of Trayning is a local government area in the Wheatbelt region of Western Australia, about 60 kilometres (37 mi) northwest of Merredin and about 240 kilometres (149 mi) east of the state capital, Perth. The Shire covers an area of 1,651 square kilometres (637 sq mi), and its seat of government is the town of Trayning.

== History ==
The current Shire of Trayning area was historically split between the Meckering Road District and Kellerberrin Road District.

The shire originated as the Korrelocking Road District, established on 30 June 1911, which covered Trayning, Wyalkatchem and parts of Mount Marshall and Dowerin. On 18 March 1912, a section of the district was transferred to the new Dowerin Road District, and Korrelocking was renamed the Ninghan Road District. Another section of the district separated on 18 June 1920 with the establishment of the Wyalkatchem Road District.

The Mount Marshall Road District split away from the Ninghan district on 6 July 1923, and the remaining district was renamed the Kununoppin-Trayning Road District on 12 October 1923.

It became the Shire of Trayning-Kununoppin-Yelbeni on 1 July 1961 under the Local Government Act 1960, which reformed all remaining road districts into shires. It was then renamed to the Shire of Trayning on 10 September 1965.

== Wards ==
The shire has no wards, and all councillors serve four-year terms. Previously, it was divided into three wards.

- Trayning Ward (3 councillors)
- Kununoppin Ward (4 councillors)
- Yelbeni Ward (2 councillors)

== Towns and localities ==
The towns and localities of the Shire of Trayning with population and size figures based on the most recent Australian census:

Locality	Population	Area	Map
Kununoppin	49 (SAL 2021)	2.7 km^{2} (1.0 sq mi)	
North Kununoppin	24 (SAL 2021)	330.9 km^{2} (127.8 sq mi)	
North Trayning	26 (SAL 2021)	243.3 km^{2} (93.9 sq mi)	
North Yelbeni	11 (SAL 2021)	225.4 km^{2} (87.0 sq mi)	
South Kununoppin	18 (SAL 2021)	238.9 km^{2} (92.2 sq mi)	
South Trayning	29 (SAL 2021)	370.6 km^{2} (143.1 sq mi)	
South Yelbeni	25 (SAL 2021)	236 km^{2} (91 sq mi)	
Trayning	112 (SAL 2021)	1.6 km^{2} (0.62 sq mi)	
Yelbeni	0 (SAL 2021)	1.6 km^{2} (0.62 sq mi)	

== Heritage-listed places ==
As of 2023, 55 places are heritage-listed in the Shire of Trayning, of which four are on the State Register of Heritage Places.
