= Shire of Mount Marshall =

Coordinates: 30°48′40″S 117°51′43″E

- Local government area
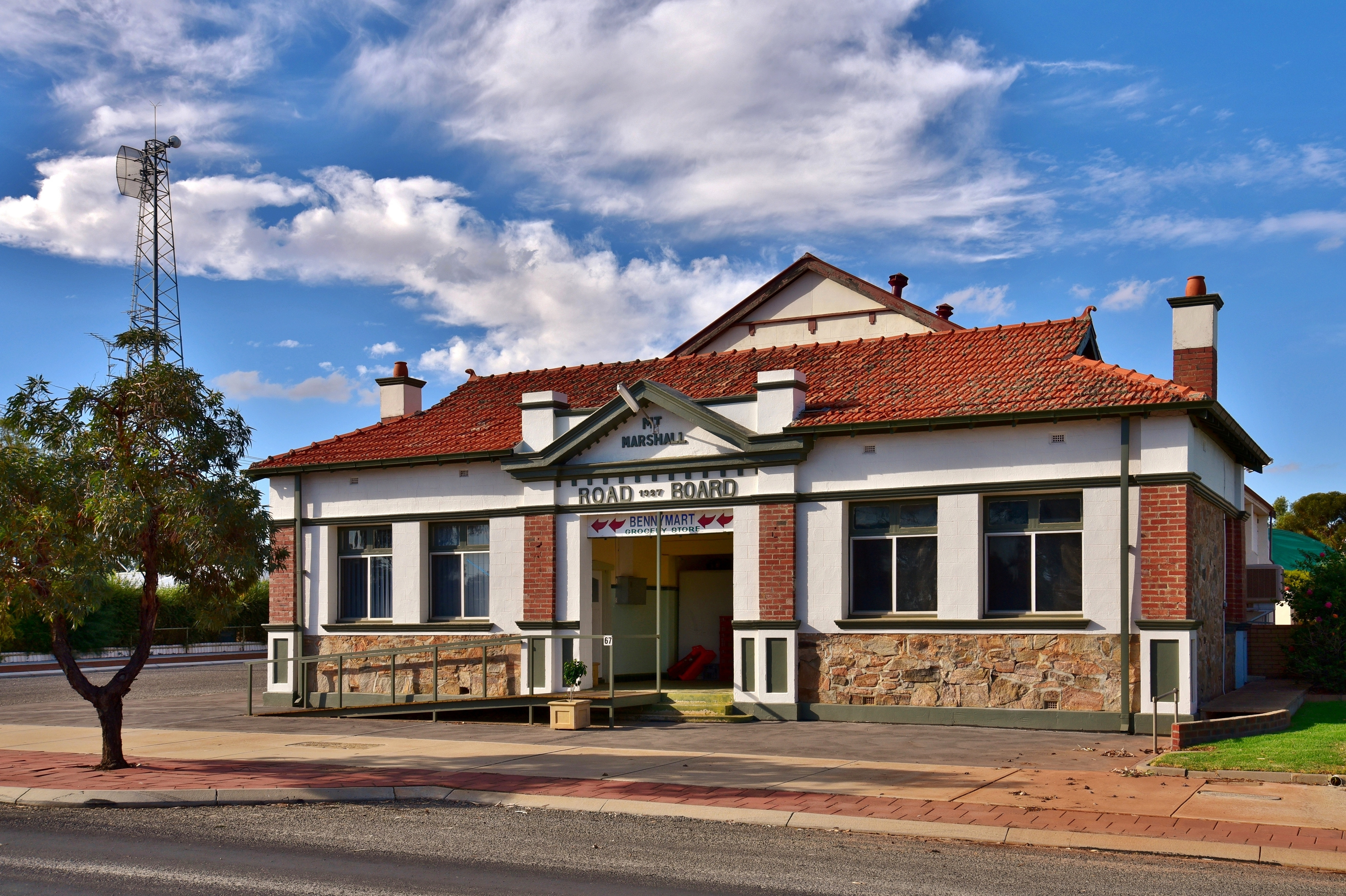
- Mount Marshall Shire Hall, Bencubbin, 2018

- Interactive map of Shire of Mount Marshall
- Country: Australia
- State: Western Australia
- Region: Wheatbelt
- Established: 1923
- Council seat: Bencubbin

Government
  - Shire President: Tony Sachse
  - State electorate: Central Wheatbelt
  - Federal division: Durack

Area
  - Total: 10,189.5 km^{2} (3,934.2 sq mi)

Population
  - Total: 459 (LGA 2021)
  - Density: 0.06/km^{2} (0.16/sq mi)
- Website: Shire of Mount Marshall
LGAs around Shire of Mount Marshall
Dalwallinu	Yalgoo	Sandstone
Koorda	Shire of Mount Marshall	Yilgarn
Wyalkatchem	Trayning	Mukinbudin

The Shire of Mount Marshall is a local government area in the Wheatbelt region of Western Australia, about 80 kilometres (50 mi) north-northwest of Merredin and about 300 kilometres (186 mi) northeast of the state capital, Perth. The Shire covers an area of 10,190 square kilometres (3,934 sq mi), and its seat of government is the town of Bencubbin.

== History ==
The first European explorer in the area was Surveyor General John Septimus Roe; Mount Marshall and Lake McDermott were named after early Swan River Colony settler Marshall McDermott, cashier of the Bank of Western Australia, magistrate, and a director of the Agricultural Society of Western Australia. The area was first settled by sandalwood collectors and graziers in 1868. Sandalwood was removed from this area from the 1880s until the 1920s. Permanent settlement and the development and clearing of the land for farms commenced around 1910.

The Mount Marshall Road District was established on 6 July 1923 from areas formerly falling within the Ninghan Road District and Nungarin Road District. On 1 July 1961, it became a shire following the passage of the Local Government Act 1960, which reformed all remaining road districts into shires.

== Wards ==
The Shire has no wards and each Councillor represents the entire district of the Shire of Mt Marshall as required by the Local Government Act 1995.

== Towns and localities ==
The towns and localities of the Shire of Mount Marshall with population and size figures based on the most recent Australian census:

Locality	Population	Area	Map
Beacon	123 (SAL 2021)	701.3 km^{2} (270.8 sq mi)	
Bencubbin	203 (SAL 2021)	688 km^{2} (266 sq mi)	
Bimbijy	0 (SAL 2016)	880.7 km^{2} (340.0 sq mi)	
Cleary	3 (SAL 2021)	398.4 km^{2} (153.8 sq mi)	
Gabbin	44 (SAL 2021)	806.9 km^{2} (311.5 sq mi)	
Karroun Hill	0 (SAL 2016)	2,814.2 km^{2} (1,086.6 sq mi)	
Mouroubra	0 (SAL 2016)	1,311.5 km^{2} (506.4 sq mi)	
Remlap	0 (SAL 2016)	717 km^{2} (277 sq mi)	
Tampu	18 (SAL 2021)	576.5 km^{2} (222.6 sq mi)	
Welbungin	35 (SAL 2021)	875.3 km^{2} (338.0 sq mi)	
Wialki *	45 (SAL 2021)	889.1 km^{2} (343.3 sq mi)	

- (* indicates locality is only partially located within this shire)

== Heritage-listed places ==
As of 2023, 50 places are heritage-listed in the Shire of Mount Marshall, of which none are on the State Register of Heritage Places.
