= Trayning, Western Australia =

Trayning
- Town
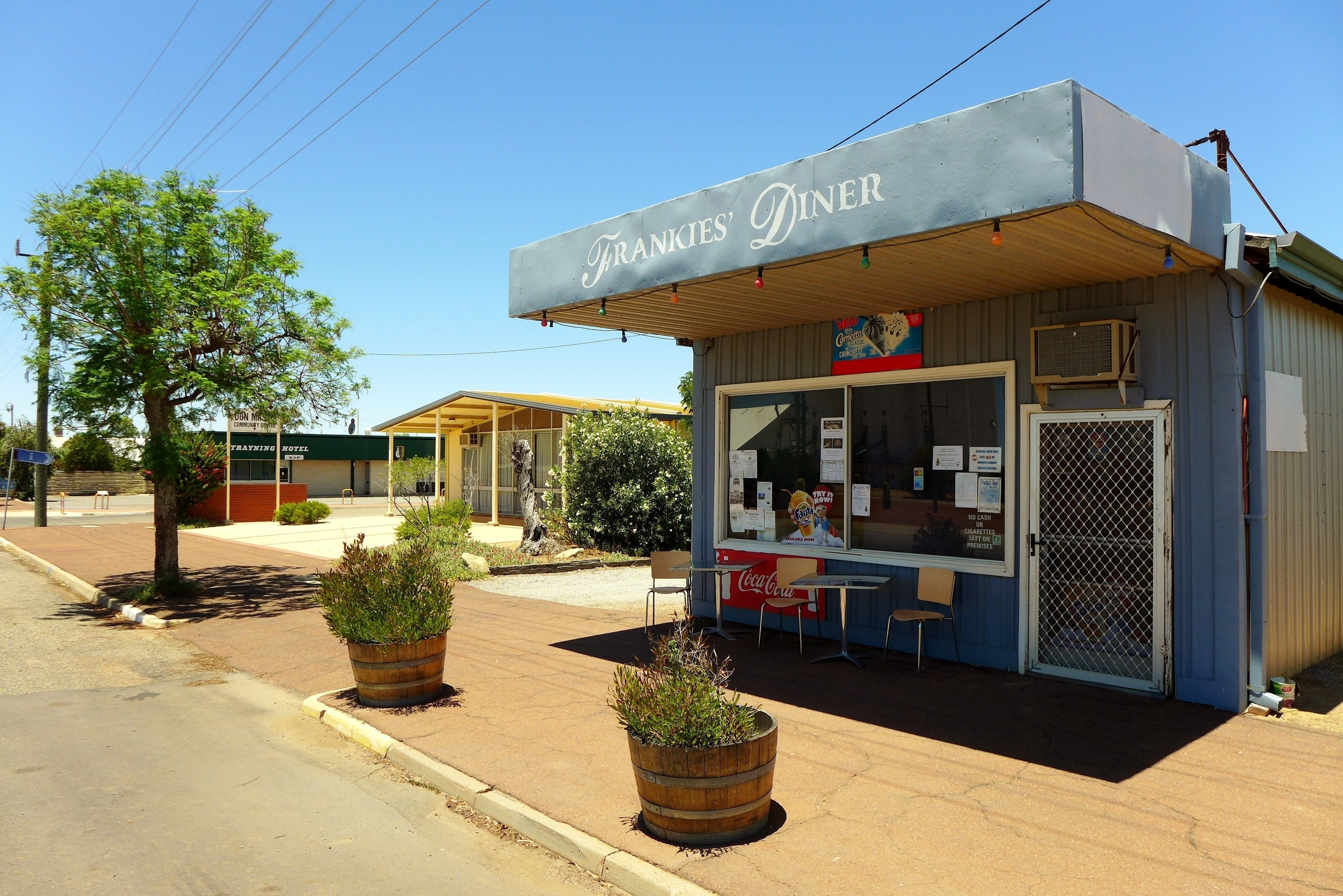
- View of Railway Street, Trayning, 2014

- Interactive map of Trayning
- Coordinates: 31°07′00″S 117°48′00″E
- Country: Australia
- State: Western Australia
- Region: Wheatbelt
- LGA: Shire of Trayning
- Location: 236 km (147 mi) from Perth; 44 km (27 mi) from Wyalkatchem
- Established: 1912

Government
  - State electorate: Central Wheatbelt
  - Federal division: Durack

Area
  - Total: 1.6 km^{2} (0.62 sq mi)

Population
  - Total: 112 (SAL 2021)
- Postcode: 6488

Trayning is a town in the north-eastern Wheatbelt region of Western Australia, 236 kilometres (147 mi) east of the state capital, Perth, on the Nungarin–Wyalkatchem Road. At the 2006 census, Trayning had a population of 122.

== History ==
When the Dowerin to Merredin railway line was planned in 1910, Trayning was selected as the site for a siding. Land was set aside for a townsite to be named Trayning Siding in 1910, but when it was surveyed and gazetted in 1912 it was named Trayning. The townsite is named after Trayning Well, the Aboriginal name of a nearby water source on an old road from Goomalling to the eastern goldfields. It was first recorded by a surveyor in 1892, and allegedly derives from the Aboriginal word During meaning "snake in the grass by the campfire".

== Railway ==
In 1932 the Wheat Pool announced the town would have two grain elevators, each fitted with an engine, installed at the railway siding. Trayning was one of the first five locations of bulk wheat transport on the Western Australian Government Railways and consequently one of the starting points of the CBH Group system of grain receival points.

The Trayning to Merredin railway line has been designated a Tier 3 line in the wheatbelt railway network, and was closed in October 2013.

== Present day ==
The town is a tourist base for exploring local wildflowers, has a K-7 primary school with 15 students that was opened in 1912, and a 25-metre swimming pool. An attraction is the annual Trayning Tractor Pull.

The surrounding areas produce wheat and other cereal crops. The town is a receival site for Cooperative Bulk Handling.

== Politics ==
Polling place statistics are shown below showing the votes from Trayning in the federal and state elections as indicated.

2004 federal election Source: AEC
| Liberal | 60.8% |
| The Nationals | 21.0% |
| Labor | 9.09% |
| Greens | 3.50% |
| One Nation | 2.10% |

2005 state election Source: WAEC
| The Nationals | 61.0% |
| Liberal | 20.1% |
| Labor | 13.6% |
| New Country | 1.95% |
| Greens | 1.95% |

2001 federal election Source: AEC
| Liberal | 59.8% |
| The Nationals | 12.8% |
| Labor | 13.4% |
| One Nation | 7.93% |
| Greens | 3.05% |

2001 state election Source: WAEC
| The Nationals | 47.2% |
| One Nation | 22.6% |
| Labor | 17.0% |
| Greens | 7.55% |
| Independent | 3.14% |

1998 federal election Source: AEC
| Liberal | 59.1% |
| The Nationals | 14.1% |
| One Nation | 13.4% |
| Labor | 9.40% |
| Greens | 0.67% |

1996 state election Source: WAEC
| The Nationals | 83.2% |
| Labor | 16.8% |
