= Bencubbin =

Town in the Wheatbelt region of Western Australia

- Town
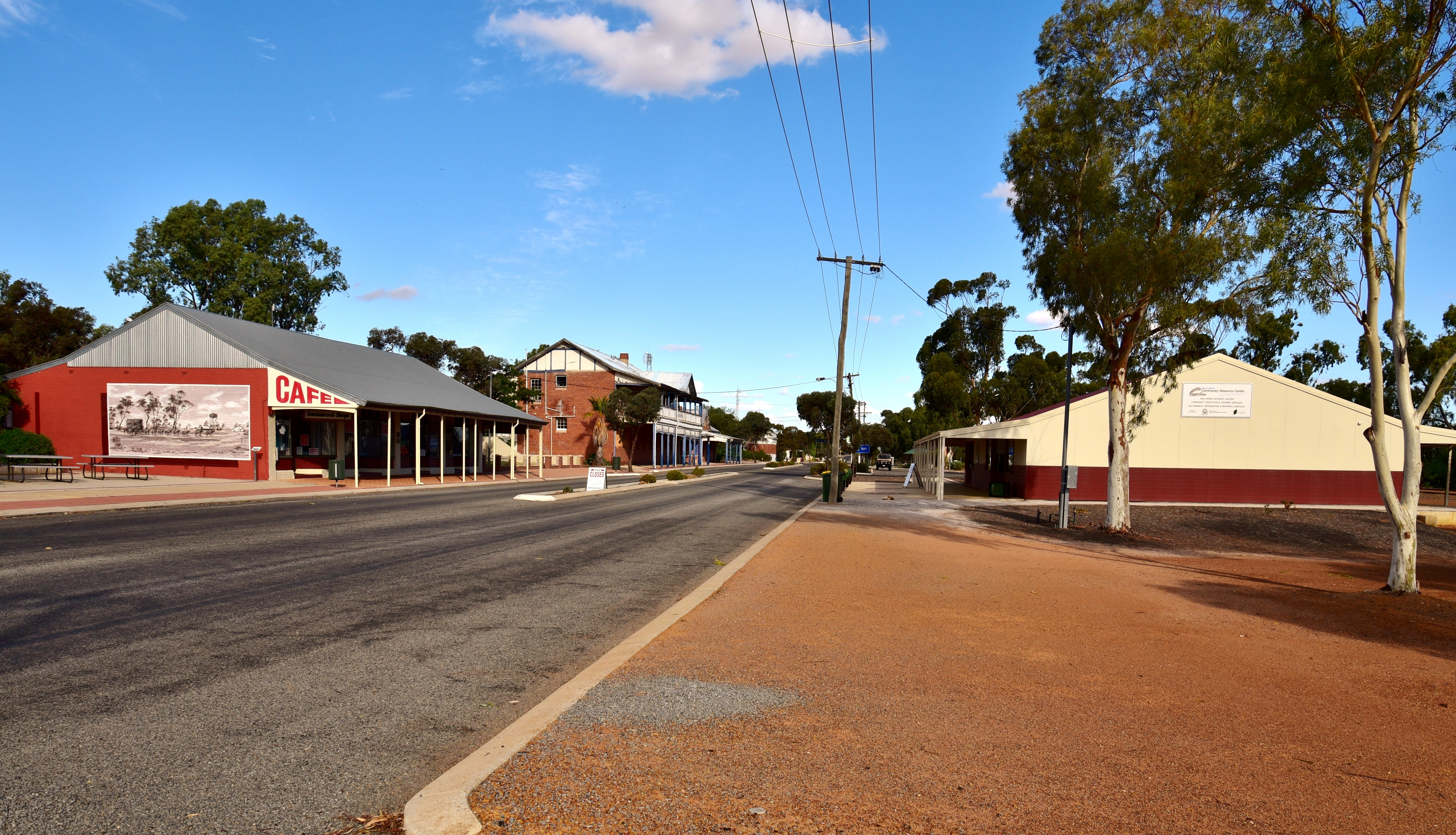
- Monger Street, Bencubbin, 2018

- Interactive map of Bencubbin
- Coordinates: 30.811°S 117.862°E
- Country: Australia
- State: Western Australia
- LGA: Shire of Mount Marshall
- Location: 275 km (171 mi) NE of Perth; 35 km (22 mi) WNW of Mukinbudin; 84 km (52 mi) NW of Merredin
- Established: 1917

Government
  - State electorate: Central Wheatbelt
  - Federal division: Durack

Area
  - Total: 688 km^{2} (266 sq mi)
- Elevation: 364 m (1,194 ft)

Population
  - Total: 203 (SAL 2021)
- Postcode: 6477

Bencubbin is a town in Western Australia in the north eastern Wheatbelt, 275 km north-east of Perth. The town lies within the Shire of Mount Marshall and is home to approximately 294 people as of 2011. Surveyor General John Septimus Roe first surveyed the region in 1836 and he was followed by sandalwood cutters and stockmen, but it was not until 1908 that the first permanent settlers arrived.

The name "Bencubbin" comes from the Aboriginal word for "place of the snakes" and is now applied to the rock to the north of the town. The aboriginal word is generally spelt "Gnylbencubbing" and is not the rock known as Mount Marshall. Mount Marshall is south-east of Bencubbin, whereas the rock known as Gnylbencubbing is at the northern edge of the township. Mount Marshall is named after Captain Marshall MacDermott, who was the first manager of the Western Australian branch of the Bank of Australasia. These two rocks and Wiacubbing Hill are three of the largest outcrops around Bencubbin.

The name was suggested for the railway station at terminus of the Wyalkatchem to Mount Marshall railway line, by J Hope, the Chief Draftsman, in 1913. The townsite was gazetted later in 1917. The first Bencubbin police station was founded in 1923.

In 1932 the Wheat Pool of Western Australia announced that the town would have two grain elevators, each fitted with an engine, installed at the railway siding.

The town supermarket was destroyed by a fire in 2006 which started early in the morning. The fire was brought under control in two hours causing no injuries and causing over $100,000 damage. The police station (staffed by two officers) saw them mobilise and assist to keep the town running. A makeshift store was set up to provide valuable supplies to the community.

The surrounding areas produce wheat and other cereal crops. The town is a receival site for CBH Group with two horizontal closed storage structures that can hold up to 54,000 tonnes.

== Climate ==
Climate data for Bencubbin (1991–2020 normals, extremes 1957–present)
Month	Jan	Feb	Mar	Apr	May	Jun	Jul	Aug	Sep	Oct	Nov	Dec	Year
Record high °C (°F)	46.0 (114.8)	46.0 (114.8)	42.8 (109.0)	38.3 (100.9)	33.8 (92.8)	27.2 (81.0)	25.6 (78.1)	31.4 (88.5)	36.0 (96.8)	39.2 (102.6)	43.1 (109.6)	45.3 (113.5)	46.0 (114.8)
Mean daily maximum °C (°F)	34.6 (94.3)	33.6 (92.5)	30.6 (87.1)	26.5 (79.7)	21.4 (70.5)	18.1 (64.6)	16.9 (62.4)	18.1 (64.6)	21.1 (70.0)	26.0 (78.8)	29.6 (85.3)	32.8 (91.0)	25.8 (78.4)
Daily mean °C (°F)	26.4 (79.5)	26.0 (78.8)	23.5 (74.3)	20.0 (68.0)	15.4 (59.7)	12.7 (54.9)	11.7 (53.1)	12.3 (54.1)	14.3 (57.7)	18.2 (64.8)	21.7 (71.1)	24.6 (76.3)	18.9 (66.0)
Mean daily minimum °C (°F)	18.3 (64.9)	18.4 (65.1)	16.5 (61.7)	13.4 (56.1)	9.3 (48.7)	7.3 (45.1)	6.4 (43.5)	6.4 (43.5)	7.5 (45.5)	10.5 (50.9)	13.9 (57.0)	16.4 (61.5)	12.0 (53.6)
Record low °C (°F)	8.0 (46.4)	7.4 (45.3)	5.6 (42.1)	1.7 (35.1)	−2.3 (27.9)	−3.7 (25.3)	−4.3 (24.3)	−1.7 (28.9)	−3.3 (26.1)	−2.2 (28.0)	2.8 (37.0)	6.3 (43.3)	−4.3 (24.3)
Average precipitation mm (inches)	23.8 (0.94)	17.8 (0.70)	22.6 (0.89)	19.2 (0.76)	27.2 (1.07)	33.0 (1.30)	41.5 (1.63)	36.6 (1.44)	25.2 (0.99)	14.5 (0.57)	16.1 (0.63)	14.7 (0.58)	292.2 (11.50)
Average precipitation days (≥ 1.0 mm)	2.5	2.8	2.5	3.0	4.6	6.4	7.4	7.1	4.7	2.6	2.6	2.0	48.2
Source 1: National Oceanic and Atmospheric Administration
Source 2: Bureau of Meteorology

== Governance ==
Bencubbin, along with the town Beacon make up the Shire of Mount Marshall which falls under the Division of Durack. The Shire of Mount Marshall has seven elected councillors who are elected by the residents of the Shire on the third Saturday in October every second year. The council meets to address the issues of the shire on the last Tuesday of every month.

== Demographics ==
According to the 2011 census conducted in Western Australia in 2011, 90.1% of the population of Bencubbin were born in Australia. The predominant ethnicity of Bencubbin consists mainly from immigrants of British and Irish heritage who settled in the region from the 1890s on wards. Due to such a large influx of immigrants from western Europe, the main religion today in Bencubbin are denominations of Christianity, specifically Anglican (35.1%), Catholic (18.9%), Uniting Church (9.1%) and 21.3% state no religious affiliation. English is the most commonly spoken language with 96.2% of the township speaking only English.

== Sport ==
The Bencubbin township participates in numerous sporting leagues including golf, cricket, hockey, netball and the most popular being Australian football, a code of football indigenous to Australia. The Bencubbin football club, known colloquially as the demons, participates in the central Wheatbelt football league. An amateur sporting league that consists of six clubs from surrounding townships who have competed against each other since 1968, where Bencubbin was a founding member of the league. Bencubbin have won five premiership titles in their history which is third highest overall in the league.

== Notable events ==
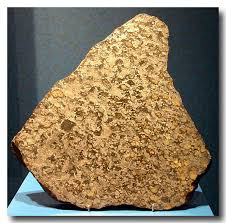
Image of a fragment from the Bencubbin Meteor, housed at the Smithsonian Institution

Making Bencubbin infamous in the field of geology was the discovery in 1930 of 58 kg, rare and previously unknown type of meteorite which was aptly named "the Bencubbin". It was uncovered whilst ploughing on newly cleared land destined to be a wheat farm just 15 kilometres north-west of Bencubbin. Fragments of the meteorite reside in the Smithsonian Institution, Washington DC..
