= Wyalkatchem, Western Australia =

Wyalkatchem
- Town
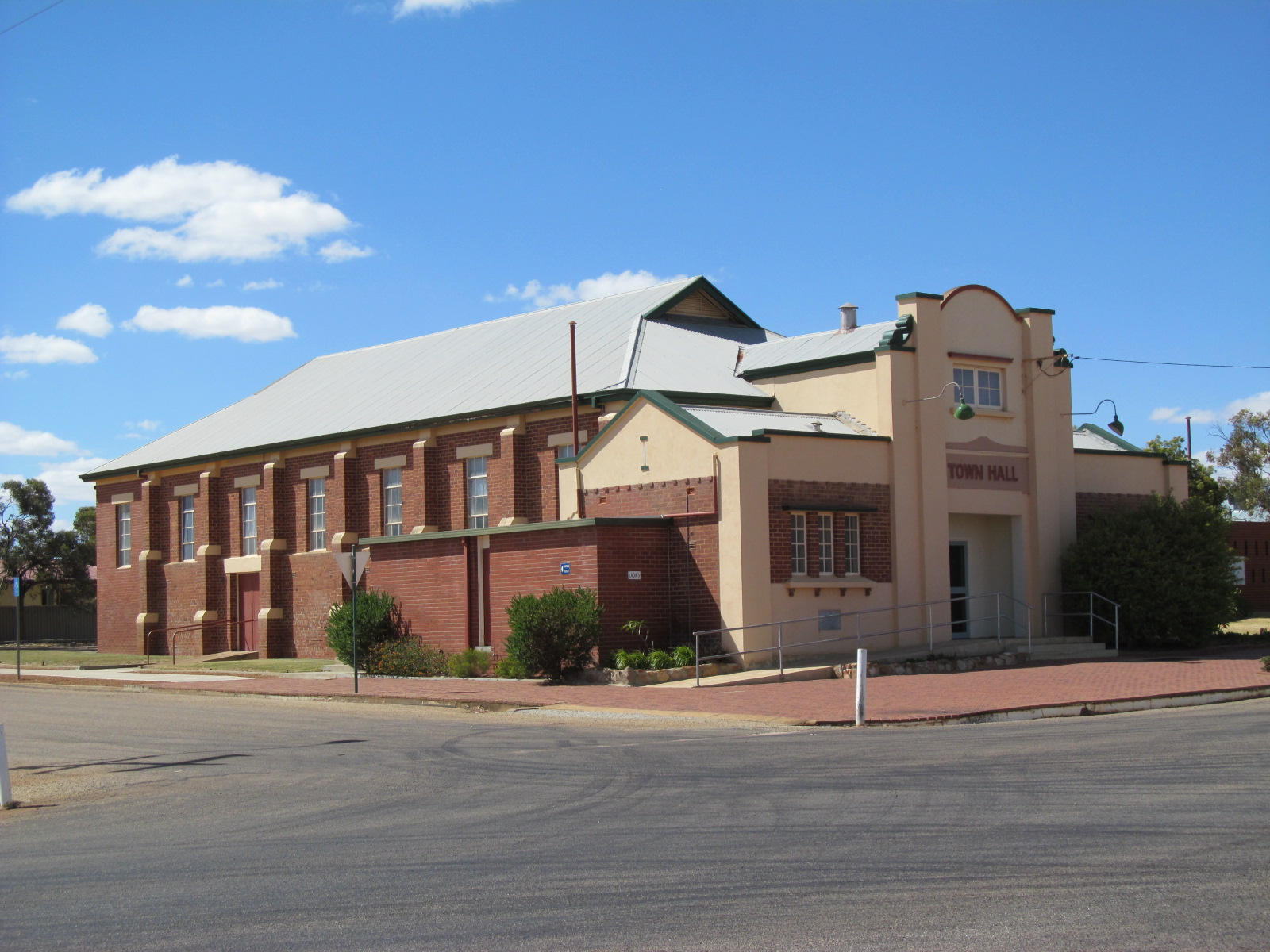
- Wyalkatchem Town Hall, 2013

- Interactive map of Wyalkatchem
- Coordinates: 31°11′00″S 117°23′00″E
- Country: Australia
- State: Western Australia
- LGA: Shire of Wyalkatchem
- Location: 192 km (119 mi) NE of Perth; 35 km (22 mi) E of Dowerin
- Established: 1910s

Government
  - State electorate: Central Wheatbelt
  - Federal division: Durack

Area
  - Total: 511.4 km^{2} (197.5 sq mi)

Population
  - Total: 304 (UCL 2021)
- Postcode: 6485

Wyalkatchem is a town in the central Wheatbelt region of Western Australia, 192 kilometres (119 mi) north-east of Perth, 35 kilometres (22 mi) east of Dowerin and 44 kilometres (27 mi) south of Koorda. At the 2021 census, it had a population of 358.

== History ==
Wyalkatchem is an Aboriginal name first recorded for a waterhole, spelt Walkatching in the 1870s. The spelling Walcatching was used in 1881 when the Toodyay Road Board referred to a tank to be built there, and when the road from Northam to the Yilgarn Goldfield was surveyed in 1892 the spelling Wyalcatchem was used for the tank. The Walkatching spelling is probably the most accurate, as Aboriginal names in this region rarely end in em. The change of spelling from Wyalcatchem to Wyalkatchem in 1911 was done by the Department of Lands & Surveys according to rules the department had adopted for spelling Aboriginal names. The meaning of the name is not known.

In 1932 the Wheat Pool of Western Australia announced that the town would have two grain elevators, each fitted with an engine, installed at the railway siding.

When the extension of the railway east from Dowerin was planned in 1908, land was set aside for a future townsite in the area of the Wyalcatchem tank. The route of the railway and site for a station was not fixed until 1910, and action followed to then fix the position of the townsite and survey town lots. Following the survey of the lots the townsite was gazetted spelt Wyalkatchem in 1911.

When the railway line from Dowerin opened in February 1911, Wyalkatchem was a minor siding only, but its importance grew when it was selected as the junction for a branch line leading north and then east to the Mount Marshall district. Thus a small village quickly blossomed on the town site. The branch line to Bencubbin opened in February 1917 and the line from Dowerin was extended to Merredin in August 1911.

In 1981 the CBH Agricultural Museum opened inside one of the 1936 built wheatbins.

The town won the state tidy town award in 2000 and 2002, and then won the national award in 2003.

A bioblitz was conducted in 2012 in a bush reserve between Korrelocking and Wyalkatchem. 54 people took part and collected samples of scorpions, pseudoscorpions, isopods, spiders and centipedes, including some new species.

== Commercial area ==
The extensive railway barracks in town are leased by the shire council from the Western Australian Government Railways. The barracks represent one of the few intact examples of its kind in Australia and are currently used as accommodation during Dowerin Field Days and as the headquarters of a hang-gliding club.

The area is home to a CBH Group receival point that can hold 122,000 tonnes of wheat. The town also supports a gypsum mine that is situated just outside town at Lake Cowcowing.

In 2013 Wyalkatchem hosted the inaugural Racewars event, organised by The Racewars Group. The event saw 200 competitors and over 3000 spectators witness some of Western Australia's fastest vehicles race head-to-head and against the clock on the 1,000 metre airstrip at Wyalkatchem Airport. After the success of the inaugural event, Wyalkatchem agreed to host the event for another five years.

== Climate ==
Climate data for Wyalkatchem
| Month | Jan | Feb | Mar | Apr | May | Jun | Jul | Aug | Sep | Oct | Nov | Dec | Year |
|---|---|---|---|---|---|---|---|---|---|---|---|---|---|
| Record high °C (°F) | 44.0 (111.2) | 43.8 (110.8) | 41.1 (106.0) | 38.2 (100.8) | 33.4 (92.1) | 25.4 (77.7) | 24.2 (75.6) | 25.9 (78.6) | 34.4 (93.9) | 39.9 (103.8) | 41.3 (106.3) | 43.6 (110.5) | 44.0 (111.2) |
| Mean daily maximum °C (°F) | 33.9 (93.0) | 33.3 (91.9) | 29.6 (85.3) | 24.4 (75.9) | 20.2 (68.4) | 17.0 (62.6) | 16.0 (60.8) | 16.7 (62.1) | 19.7 (67.5) | 24.3 (75.7) | 28.3 (82.9) | 32.4 (90.3) | 24.6 (76.3) |
| Mean daily minimum °C (°F) | 17.7 (63.9) | 17.9 (64.2) | 15.8 (60.4) | 12.9 (55.2) | 9.5 (49.1) | 8.0 (46.4) | 6.7 (44.1) | 6.1 (43.0) | 7.1 (44.8) | 9.8 (49.6) | 12.6 (54.7) | 15.9 (60.6) | 11.7 (53.1) |
| Record low °C (°F) | 9.3 (48.7) | 9.0 (48.2) | 5.9 (42.6) | 3.3 (37.9) | 0.9 (33.6) | 0.8 (33.4) | −1.2 (29.8) | −1.1 (30.0) | 0.8 (33.4) | 0.7 (33.3) | 3.6 (38.5) | 7.0 (44.6) | −1.2 (29.8) |
| Average precipitation mm (inches) | 17.2 (0.68) | 16.8 (0.66) | 18.7 (0.74) | 23.1 (0.91) | 41.5 (1.63) | 54.1 (2.13) | 52.9 (2.08) | 40.1 (1.58) | 23.9 (0.94) | 17.1 (0.67) | 11.3 (0.44) | 10.3 (0.41) | 327.8 (12.91) |
| Average precipitation days | 2.2 | 2.2 | 2.8 | 4.4 | 7.9 | 11.1 | 12.1 | 10.7 | 7.5 | 4.9 | 3.0 | 2.0 | 70.8 |
