= Bernard Evans (architect) =

Australian Army officer

Sir Bernard Evans
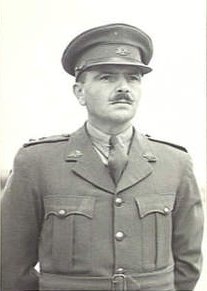
- Lt Col Bernard Evans in January 1942
- Born: 13 May 1905; Manchester, England
- Died: 19 February 1988 (aged 82); Toorak, Australia
- Military career
- Allegiance: Australia
- Branch: Australian Army
- Service years: 1924–1945
- Rank: Brigadier
- Commands: 24th Brigade (1942–43); 2/23rd Battalion (1940–42); 57th/60th Infantry Battalion (1939–40)
- Conflicts: Second World War
- Awards: Knight Bachelor; Distinguished Service Order; Efficiency Decoration; Mentioned in Despatches (3); Knight of the Order of the Star of Italian Solidarity
- Other work: Architect; Lord Mayor of Melbourne

Brigadier Sir Bernard Evans, DSO, ED (13 May 1905 – 19 February 1981) was an Australian army officer, architect, builder and Lord Mayor of Melbourne (1959–1961).

== Early years ==
Evans was born in Manchester, England on 13 May 1905. In 1913 his family emigrated to Melbourne, initially living in St Kilda, and subsequently in Hampton. After completing his secondary schooling, he studied architectural drawing at night, and then worked as a designer and builder for his father, a builder. He was commissioned in the cadets in 1923, and the Militia in 1924. At Hampton Church of England on 21 September 1929 he married Dorothy May Ellis.

== Builder and designer ==
In 1928 Evans established Hampton Timber & Hardware Pty Ltd and the Premier Building Co Pty Ltd. and begun building speculative villas, as well as an Arts and Crafts bungalow in Hampton called `Bunyip Lodge’ (c.1930) for his father-in-law. He also designed and built houses for the State Savings Bank of Victoria and hospitals for the Victorian Bush Nursing Association.

The Depression saw Evans and his father head for Perth to establish a branch of their timber and hardware business, though Bernard soon returned to Melbourne as the designer and sometimes developer of blocks of flats in the early 1930s. WA mining entrepreneur Claude de Bernales engaged him for mining buildings at Kalgoorlie and Wiluna, then in 1936 he contracted Bernard - now styling himself a `designer and master builder’ - for London Court, a Tudor Revival open air arcade, long a Perth institution. Also in 1936 de Bernales engaged him on a project in Melbourne, to replace the Brookwood mansion at 32 Queens Road South Melbourne with an Art Deco style block of flats, the largest in the city at the time, with 51 flats over three wings. In 1937, Evans remodeled De Bernales' mansion Overton Lodge in the Spanish Mission style, which now serves as the Cottesloe Civic Centre. In 1936, Evans' company General Construction Co. proposed a 10-storey block of flats for the corner of Robe and Acland Streets St Kilda, which would have been the tallest and largest block of flats in the city, but the council refused permission.

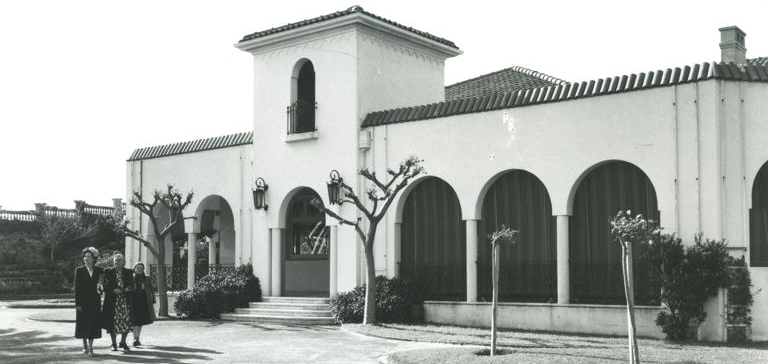
Overton Lodge, Cottesloe c1950

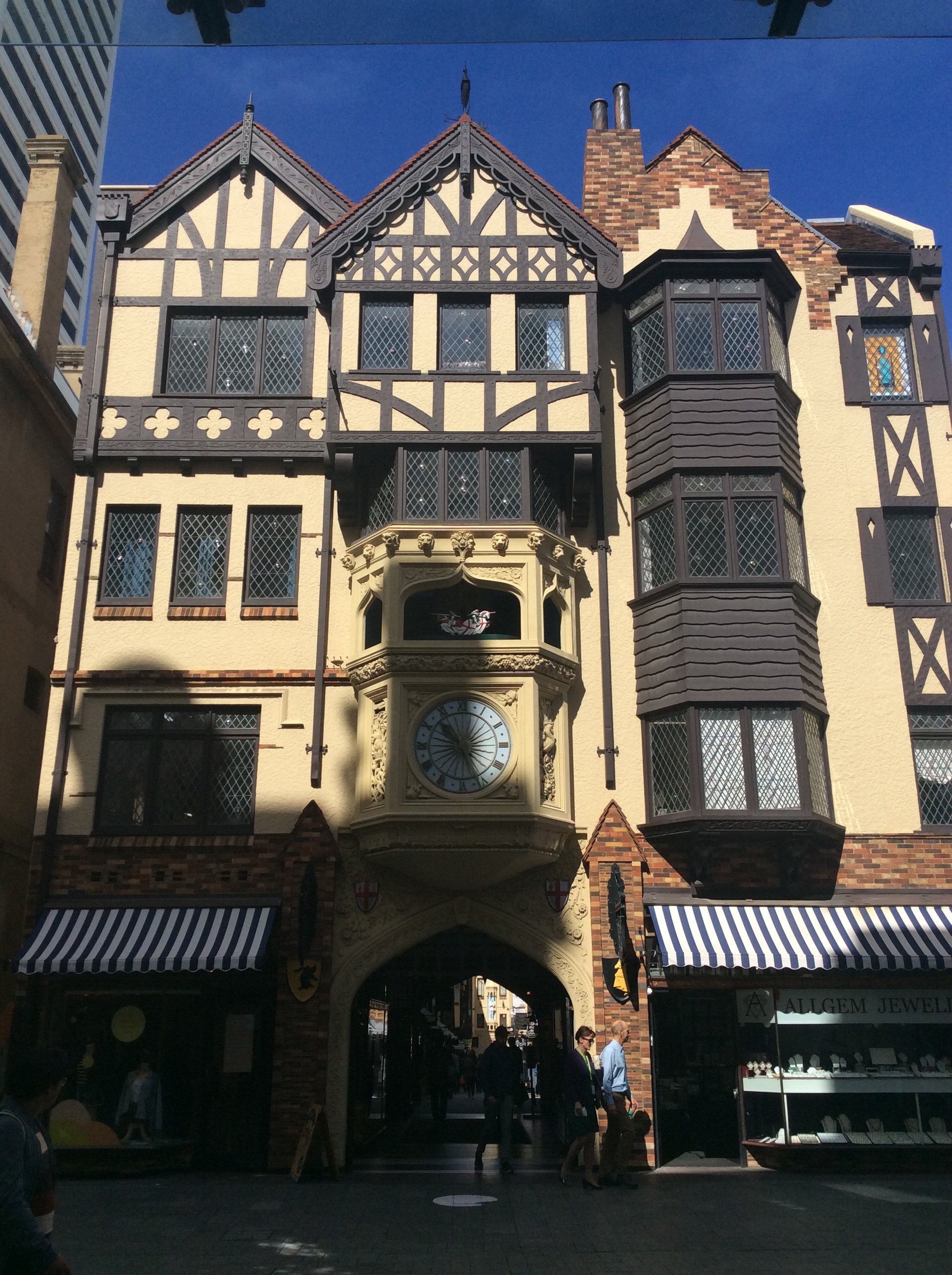
London Court, Perth

Meanwhile, in 1934, he became a major in the 46th Battalion.

In 1937 he went to London to oversee the design and construction of 'Westralia House' in Gresham Street, another de Bernales project (demolished c2006). While in Britain he was accepted into the Incorporated Association of Architects and Surveyors.

On return to Australia in 1938, he was appointed lieutenant colonel commanding the 57th/60th Infantry Battalion, and in 1940 registered as an architect in Victoria.

Through the 1930s, he also designed a number of blocks of flats in Melbourne, notably in St Kilda, East Melbourne, and South Yarra, in all the popular styles such as Old English (Tudor Revival) style, Georgian and Art Deco.

== Second World War ==
On 1 July 1940 he was appointed to the Second Australian Imperial Force and ordered to form and command the 2/23rd Battalion, "Albury's Own".

Tobruk, (April–October 1941).

El Alamein, 1 November 1942, command of the 24th Brigade as a temporary brigadier.

New Guinea, 1943.

Land Headquarters Tactical School (School of Tactics and Military Intelligence), Beenleigh, Queensland.

On 23 October 1945 he transferred to the Reserve as an honorary brigadier.

=== Military appointments ===
Cadet Service: Cdt 2lieutenant 30 Jun 23 Cdt lieutenant 31 Dec 23; Occupation: Architect

From	To	Rank	Role	Unit
13 May 1905				Born, Manchester UK
17 Dec 1924		Lieutenant		Commissioned – 46th Battalion
23 Mar 1929		Captain		
24 Aug 1934		Major		
15-Dec-1939	30-Jun-1940	Lieutenant-Colonel	Commanding Officer	57/60 Infantry Battalion
01-Jul-1940	31-Oct-1942	Lieutenant-Colonel	Commanding Officer	2/23 Infantry Battalion
26 Dec 1941				Mention in Despatches (Feb–Jul 41)
30 Dec 1941				Companion of the Distinguished Service Order
30 Jun 1942				Mention in Despatches (Jul–Oct 41)
01-Nov-1942	10-Nov-1943	Brigadier	Officer Commanding	24 Australian Infantry Brigade (North Africa & New Guinea)
5 Nov 1942		Colonel		
17 Nov 1943			Chief Instructor	School of Tactics and Military Intelligence
1943	1945		Commandant	School of Tactics and Military Intelligence
31 May 1944				Mention in Despatches (South-west Pacific Area 1 Apr-30 Sep 43)
7 Jun 1944				ED
23 Oct 1945				Retired – Reserve of Officers colonel (H/BRIG)

== Architect ==
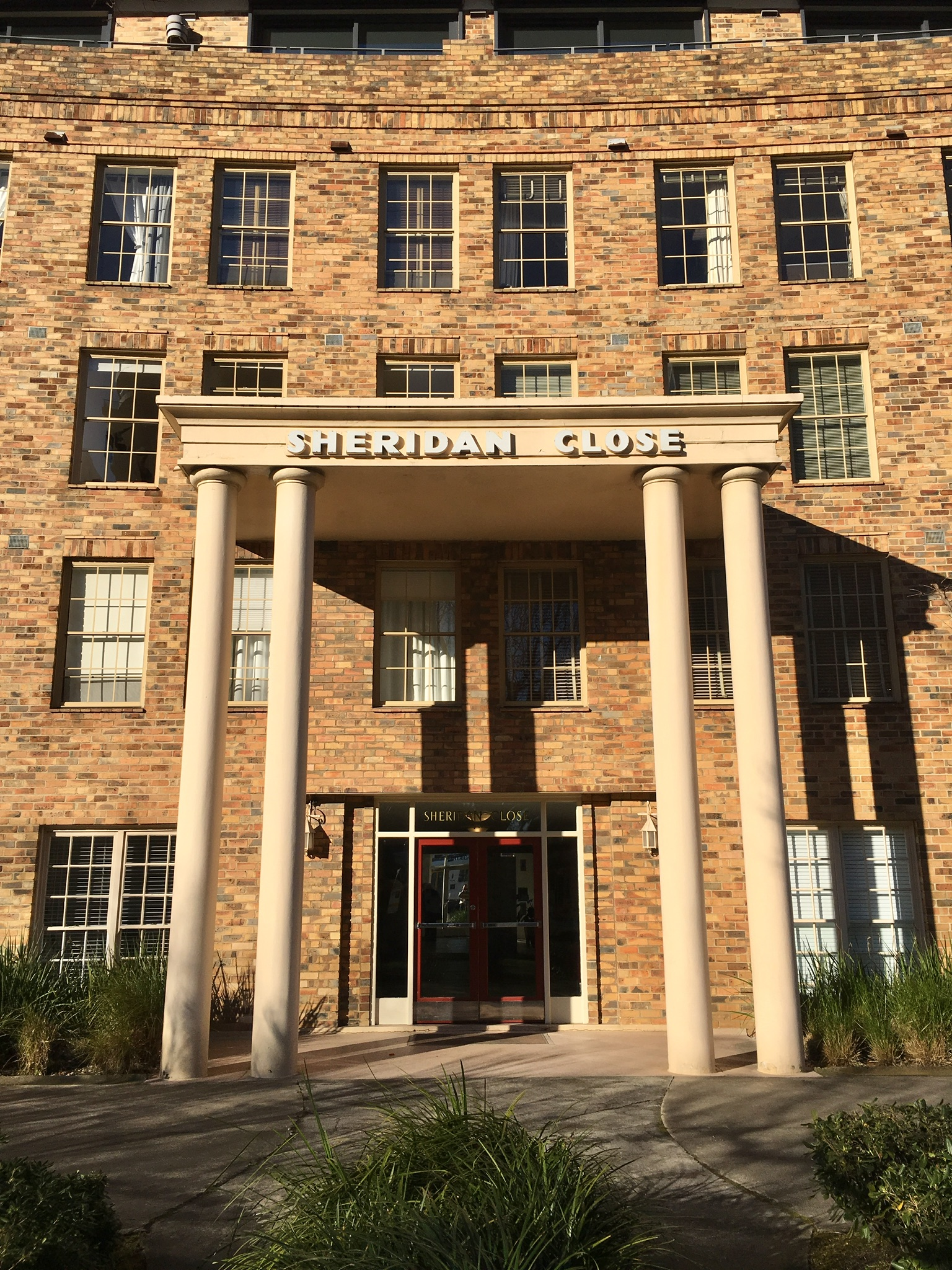
Sheridan Close St Kilda Road Portico

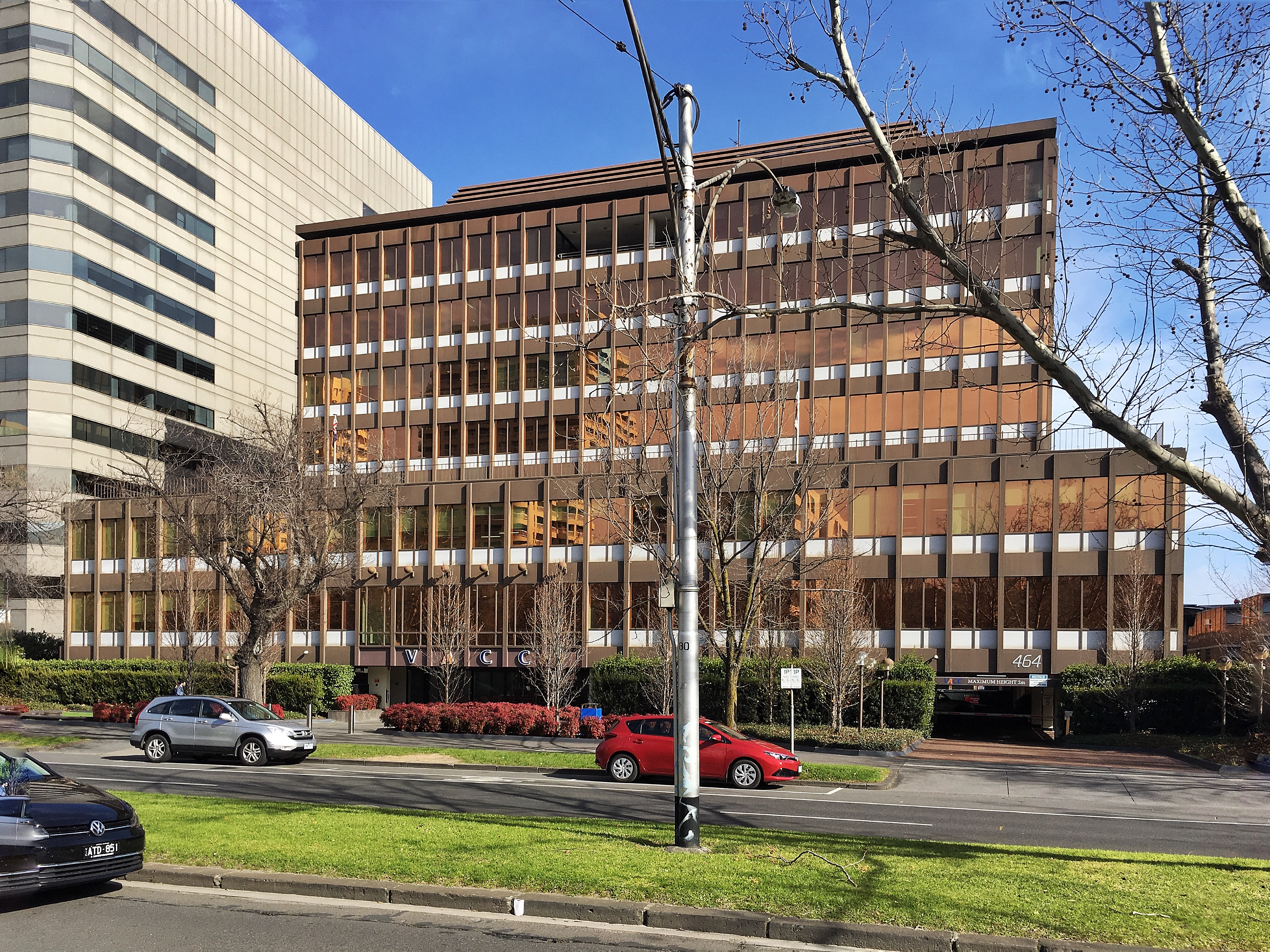
VACC St Kilda Road 1965

Returning to civilian life, Evans formed Bernard Evans & Associates, a firm which was responsible for some of the most prominent apartment and office buildings of the 1950s and 60s.

He continued his involvement in the design and development of large apartment blocks, and Greyfriars, a set of linked plain modernist cream-brick blocks of one and two bed flats around gardens and a large courtyard at 53 Balaclava Road, North Caulfield, was an early notable example. Built in 1949-51, Evans was architect as well as a director of the company, and it was touted as the first `own-your-own’ (company title) flat development in Melbourne. He very soon followed this with Sheridan Close in St Kilda road, built 1951–53, the largest `own-your-own’ development in Melbourne at the time, designed in a style described as a hybrid of Regency and Art Deco, and was followed in 1953–4 by Elizabeth Court, another own-your-own development in nearby Queen Road in a restrained Georgian style.

In 1958 he won the tender from the Housing Commission of Victoria for Emerald Hill Court, South Melbourne, for low income families, which included the first high-rise towers to be built by the commission. It also included a number of low-rise blocks, as well as a pair of joined high-rise blocks constructed using economical slip-form construction.

Bernard Evans and Associates was also responsible for some major office buildings in the central city, all while he was a City Councillor, and Lord Mayor. An early major project was Ampol House, on the corner of Elizabeth and Grattan Streets, Carlton, completed in 1958, in a style of 'twenty years previously' (which was demolished in 2011 despite being heritage listed).

This was soon followed by his most well known project, the CRA Building at 99 Collins Street, the tallest building to be built within the Hoddle Grid, completed in 1962. At 26 floors, it was 10 storeys taller than other new office towers, and as the first tower on top of the Collins Street hill in the eastern half of the city it was a very prominent. With its vertical ribbing emphasising its vertical proportions, the CRA towered over the still largely Victorian and Edwardian streetscape of the 'Paris End' of Collins Street, which it was later seen to unduly dominate, and it was not missed when it was demolished in 1988. Another tower that still stands by the firm is the white gridded Legal and General Assurance buildings on the corner of Collins and Queen Streets, completed in 1967.

Smaller projects included the Golden Square car park in Lonsdale Street (1955), a 'dream home' built in 1958 in St Kilda Road that was a prize benefitting the Queen Victoria Hospital (dem), the London Assurance office built in Bourke Street (1959), an office building at 505 St Kilda Road (1960, dem), and headquarters for the Victoria Automobile Chamber of Commerce (VACC) at 464 St Kilda Road (1965).

Evans's private companies were responsible for large suburban subdivisions, such as Witchwood Close, South Yarra, and industrial estates at Moorabbin.

== Councillor and Lord Mayor of the City of Melbourne ==
He served for over 20 years as the Melbourne city councillor for Gipps ward, from 1949–73. During this period he served two terms as Lord Mayor, 1959–60, and 60–61. With his expertise in planning and architecture, he was chairman of the building and town planning committee for many years (1956–58, 1964, 1966–70), as well the town hall and properties committee (1957–58) and the finance committee (1961). Citing European examples, he argued for taller buildings and more people living in the city, greater open space, and new buildings set back from the street to save the city from becoming `a dull, dusty jungle’. He was part of the campaign for the creation of a public square in the central city, and was an advocate in the early 60s for the site that was eventually chosen in 1966, which became the City Square. He was frequently in the news with opinions on a range of matters, such as Council's role in providing housing, the problems of traffic and parking, putting trams underground, use of the Olympic Pool, an underground train (eventually built as the City Loop), and advocating a lower Yarra crossing (eventually built as the West Gate Bridge).

Evans's reputation suffered in 1970 when his public role and private interests were alleged to have been in conflict. It was claimed that companies he controlled had benefited through the purchase of properties near the West Gate Bridge project and along the proposed underground rail loop, and through the sale of buildings to the Royal Melbourne Institute of Technology (which dated back to the 1950s when Evans had been a councillor), claims which he strenuously denied. In 1971 he resigned from his firm—by then Bernard Evans, Murphy, Berg & Hocking Pty Ltd—and in 1973 from the city council.

== Retirement ==
In retirement he continued involvement in activities such as chairing the Royal Commonwealth Society of Australia, as well as courting controversy. In 1973 he provoked the resignation of businessman and Melbourne City Councillor David Wang from the Society by his racist remarks. In retirement in his home, Warrawee, at Toorak, he indulged his enthusiasm for painting, and continued to manage his investments. Survived by his wife and their two daughters and son, he died on 19 February 1981 at home.

== Honours and awards ==
There is a plaque at St Matthew's Church, 520 Kiewa Street, Albury commemorating Evans and his formation of the 2/23rd Battalion.

Evans was appointed/awarded:

Knight Bachelor (1 January 1962)
Companion of the Distinguished Service Order (DSO) (30 December 1941)
Efficiency Decoration (ED) (1944)
Cavaliere dell'Ordine della Stella della solidarietà italiana (Knight of the Order of the Star of Italian Solidarity) (1971)

He was Mentioned in Despatches three times.

DSO Citation:
"The untiring energy and enthusiasm of this commanding officer, his solid leadership and total disregard of personal danger has been the main factor to the successes which have attended the activities of 2/23 Aust. Inf. Bn. With the exception of very brief periods in reserve positions this Bn has been in the FDLs of Tobruk since early in April and during that period Lt-Col. Evans has personally planned and supervised the numerous enterprises designed to ensure the defence of his sector and inflict losses in men, material and morale on the enemy. His personality and unceasing interest in his men has been an inspiration to all ranks."
