= Grevillea tetrapleura =

Scientific classification
- Kingdom: Plantae
- Clade: Tracheophytes
- Clade: Angiosperms
- Clade: Eudicots
- Order: Proteales
- Family: Proteaceae
- Genus: Grevillea
- Species: G. tetrapleura

Binomial name
- Grevillea tetrapleura McGill.

Species of shrub endemic to Western Australia

Grevillea tetrapleura is species of flowering plant in the family Proteaceae and is endemic to southern inland Western Australia. It is a low, dense, spreading shrub with rigid, sharply pointed linear leaves, and loose clusters of pinkish-red flowers.

== Description ==
Grevillea tetrapleura is a low, dense, spreading shrub that typically grows to a height of 10–90 cm (3.9–35.4 in). Its leaves are linear, 10–60 mm (0.39–2.36 in) long, 0.9–1.1 mm (0.035–0.043 in) wide, rigid and sharply pointed. The edges of the leaves are rolled under, enclosing the lower surface apart from the midvein and there are 4 longitudinal ridges on the upper surface. The flowers are borne in leaf axils in loose clusters of up to 4 on a rachis 0.5–1 mm (0.020–0.039 in) long. The flowers are pinkish-red, the pistil 16.5–20.5 mm (0.65–0.81 in) long. Flowering occurs from July to September and the fruit is an elliptic to oval follicle 8–11 mm (0.31–0.43 in) long.

== Taxonomy ==
Grevillea tetrapleura was first formally described by the botanist Donald McGillivray in 1986 his book, New Names in Grevillea (Proteaceae), from specimens he collected with Alex George near Yellowdine in 1976. The specific epithet (tetrapleura) means "four-ribbed".

== Distribution ==
This grevillea grows in sandy soil over granite and near granite outcrops between Yellowdine, Bullfinch and Mount Jackson in the Avon Wheatbelt and Coolgardie bioregions of southern inland Western Australia.

== See also ==
- List of Grevillea species
