= Xanthoparmelia echidnaformis =

Scientific classification
- Kingdom: Fungi
- Division: Ascomycota
- Class: Lecanoromycetes
- Order: Lecanorales
- Family: Parmeliaceae
- Genus: Xanthoparmelia
- Species: X. echidnaformis

Binomial name
- Xanthoparmelia echidnaformis Elix (2006)
- near Yellowdine, Western Australia

Species of lichen

Xanthoparmelia echidnaformis is a little-known species of saxicolous (rock-dwelling) foliose lichen in the family Parmeliaceae. It occurs in Western Australia.

== Taxonomy ==
Xanthoparmelia echidnaformis was first described by the lichenologist John A. Elix in 2006, from specimens collected along the Great Eastern Highway (about 1 km W of Yellowdine, 34 km E of Southern Cross in Western Australia. The species epithet echidnaformis is derived from the Latin forma (meaning 'form' or 'shape') and echidna (referring to the Australian spiny anteater), alluding to the dense, spiny appearance of its isidia, resembling the spines of an echidna.

== Description ==
The thallus of Xanthoparmelia echidnaformis is foliose (leafy), adnate to tightly adnate, measuring 3–5 cm wide. Lobes are separate at the margins but contiguous in the centre, somewhat linear, and dichotomously to trichotomously branched, ranging from 0.6–0.8 mm wide. The upper surface is yellow-green, flat to weakly convex, initially shiny but becomes dull and rugulose (wrinkled) with age. It features dense, cylindrical, densely coralloid-branched isidia forming a mat up to 1 mm high in the thallus centre. The medulla is white, and the lower surface ranges from pale to darker brown at the lobes' tips with moderately dense, simple (unbranched) rhizines.

== Habitat and distribution ==
At the time of its original publication, Xanthoparmelia echidnaformis was known to occur only at its type locality in the subarid inland of Western Australia. It typically grows on granite in Eucalyptus–Melaleuca woodland environments.

== See also ==
- List of Xanthoparmelia species
