= Acacia cockertoniana =

Scientific classification
- Kingdom: Plantae
- Clade: Tracheophytes
- Clade: Angiosperms
- Clade: Eudicots
- Clade: Rosids
- Order: Fabales
- Family: Fabaceae
- Subfamily: Caesalpinioideae
- Clade: Mimosoid clade
- Genus: Acacia
- Species: A. cockertoniana

Binomial name
- Acacia cockertoniana Maslin
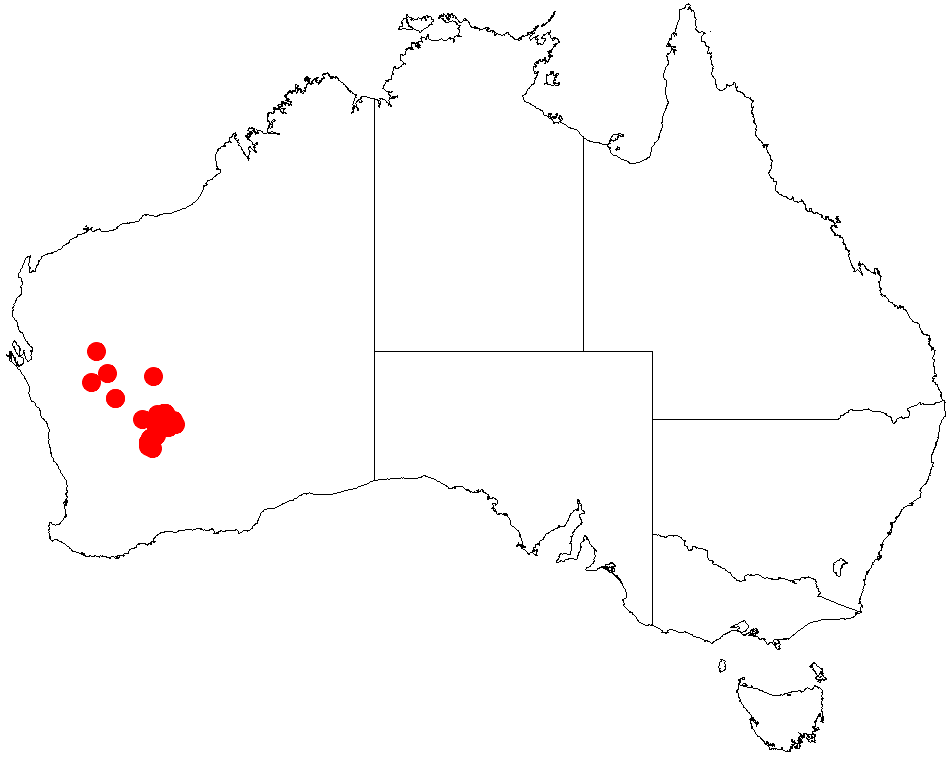
- Occurrence data from AVH

Species of legume

Acacia cockertoniana is a species of flowering plant in the family Fabaceae and is endemic to inland Western Australia. It is a cone-shaped shrub or tree with the narrower end towards the base, usually multi-stemmed with erect narrowly linear to elliptic or lance-shaped phyllodes, heads of light golden yellow flowers, and pendulous, linear, thinly crust-like pods.

== Description ==
Acacia cockertoniana is a cone-shaped shrub or tree with the narrower end towards the base, mostly 3–6 m (9.8–19.7 ft) high and usually multi-stemmed. The main stems and upper branches are slightly crooked and the crown is greyish green with a silvery sheen. Its phyllodes are erect, narrowly linear to elliptic or lance-shaped with the narrower end towards the base, 50–150 mm (2.0–5.9 in) long and 2.5–5 mm (0.098–0.197 in) wide, curved to hooked with many relatively broad veins with silky hairs between the veins. The flowers are borne in 1 or 2 oblong heads in axils on a peduncles 4–6 mm (0.16–0.24 in) long, 5–30 mm (0.20–1.18 in) long on peduncle 5–7 mm (0.20–0.28 in) long, each head with light golden yellow flowers. Flowering mostly occurs from October to December and the pods are pendulous, linear, straight to slightly curved, thinly crust-like, 60–120 mm (2.4–4.7 in) long and 3–5 mm (0.12–0.20 in) wide. The seeds are mid-brown, oblong to narrowly oblong, 4.0–4.5 mm (0.16–0.18 in) long with an aril on the end.

== Taxonomy ==
Acacia cockertoniana was first formally described in 2007 by Bruce Maslin from specimens collected in 2003 on the Windarling Range, 160 km (99 mi) north of Southern Cross. The specific epithet (cockertoniana) honours "Geoff Cockerton, ... who first brought it to my attention and who facilitated my visit in October 2004 visit to the Windarling Range to inspect plants in the field".

== Distribution ==
This species of wattle has a discontinuous distribution, occurring near Lake Barlee and Mount Magnet, on Mount Jackson, and on the Die Hardy and Windarling Ranges where it is restricted to Banded iron formation, and grows in iron-rich soils and dense Acacia shrubland.

== Conservation status ==
Acacia cockertoniana is listed as "not threatened" by the Government of Western Australia Department of Biodiversity, Conservation and Attractions.

== See also ==
- List of Acacia species
