= Australian mining entrepreneurs =

The Australian mining industry has had a series of people who have had significant impact on the Australian economy as well as the mining industry due to their wealth, and their investment in the industry. Sometimes they are designated as Mining Magnates, and they are ascribed other titles such as Mining Tycoons, however in most cases they are significantly very public figures in the media of their times. Also during various changes in the national economy and mining industry some smaller players have had to adapt to the change.

There have been occasions where they join in protest against politicians, or alternatively they become leaders of political parties, or politicians. The claims that Australian mining entrepreneurs have control over the political process also arises at times. At times tycoons have also been known to have rivalries and difference that become public.

Some people who have been more acutely private about their wealth and lives, also can be understood to be those who have gained from the mining and resources industries, such as Mark Creasy, Rick Stowe and Alan Bond whose interests at some stage in his fluctuating fortunes had investments in the industry. Stan Perron is also another who shies from any publicity. There are also lesser known individuals who have also contributed to the industry, who have not been recognised for their investment in the industry.

== Notable Australian mining entrepreneurs ==
- Claude de Bernales
- Mark Creasy
- Robert Champion de Crespigny
- Andrew Forrest
- Joseph Gutnick
- Lang Hancock
- Clive Palmer
- Ping Que
- Gina Rinehart
- Peter Wright

== Obscure entrepreneurs ==
- Watt family
