= Noongar (disambiguation) =

The Noongar are a group of Aboriginal Australian peoples.

Noongar may also refer to:

- Noongar language, an Australian Aboriginal language
- Noongar, Western Australia, a town in Australia
- Noongar Radio 100.9, a community radio station of Australia

== See also ==
- Nunga, a term of self-reference for many of the Aboriginal peoples of South Australia
