= Shire of Yilgarn =

Local government area in Western Australia

Coordinates: 31°15′14″S 119°20′38″E

- Local government area
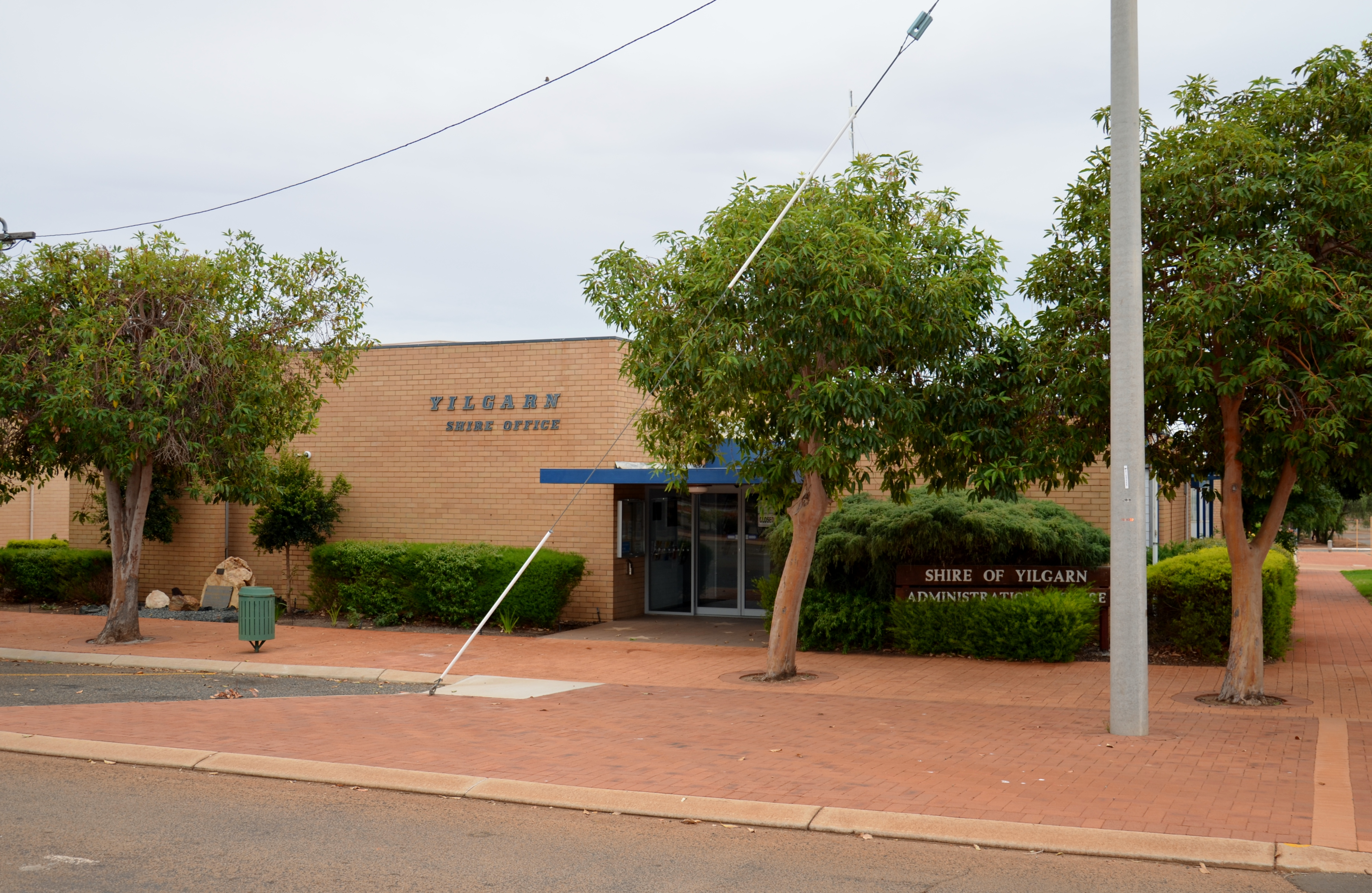
- Yilgarn Shire Office, Southern Cross, 2017

- Interactive map of Shire of Yilgarn
- Country: Australia
- State: Western Australia
- Region: Eastern Wheatbelt
- Established: 1891
- Council seat: Southern Cross

Government
  - Shire President: Wayne Della Bosca
  - State electorate: Central Wheatbelt
  - Federal division: O'Connor

Area
  - Total: 30,720 km^{2} (11,860 sq mi)

Population
  - Total: 1,173 (LGA 2021)
- Website: Shire of Yilgarn
LGAs around Shire of Yilgarn
Sandstone; Mount Marshall	Menzies	Menzies
Westonia; Merredin	Shire of Yilgarn	Coolgardie
Narembeen	Kondinin	Dundas

The Shire of Yilgarn is a local government area in the eastern Wheatbelt region of Western Australia about 400 kilometres (250 mi) east of Perth, the state capital. The Shire covers an area of 30,720 square kilometres (11,860 sq mi) and its seat of government is the town of Southern Cross. The main industries within the Shire are mining and farming.

== History ==
The Yilgarn Road District was established on 24 December 1891. The town of Southern Cross separated as the Municipality of Southern Cross on 16 June 1892, but was re-absorbed into the road district on 8 February 1918.

On 1 July 1961, it became a shire under the Local Government Act 1960, which reformed all remaining road districts into shires.

== Wards ==
The Shire of Yilgarn has no wards. It has 7 councillors.

== Towns and localities ==
The towns and localities of the Shire of Yilgarn with population and size figures based on the most recent Australian census:

Locality	Population	Area	Map
Bodallin	40 (SAL 2021)	744.3 km^{2} (287.4 sq mi)	
Bullfinch	29 (SAL 2021)	1,191.5 km^{2} (460.0 sq mi)	
Corinthia	9 (SAL 2021)	415 km^{2} (160 sq mi)	
Dulyalbin	27 (SAL 2021)	338.9 km^{2} (130.9 sq mi)	
Ennuin	0 (SAL 2016)	1,182 km^{2} (456 sq mi)	
Ghooli	17 (SAL 2021)	972.1 km^{2} (375.3 sq mi)	
Holleton	4 (SAL 2021)	392.8 km^{2} (151.7 sq mi)	
Koolyanobbing	93 (SAL 2021)	527.6 km^{2} (203.7 sq mi)	
Lake Deborah	0 (SAL 2021)	5,869.3 km^{2} (2,266.1 sq mi)	
Marvel Loch	120 (SAL 2021)	845.5 km^{2} (326.4 sq mi)	
Moorine Rock	61 (SAL 2021)	691.7 km^{2} (267.1 sq mi)	
Mount Hampton	24 (SAL 2021)	901.8 km^{2} (348.2 sq mi)	
Mount Holland	9 (SAL 2021)	1,470.6 km^{2} (567.8 sq mi)	
Mount Jackson	124 (SAL 2021)	6,328.8 km^{2} (2,443.6 sq mi)	
Mount Palmer	0 (SAL 2016)	1,662.9 km^{2} (642.0 sq mi)	
North Bodallin	17 (SAL 2021)	429.6 km^{2} (165.9 sq mi)	
Parker Range	0 (SAL 2016)	1,393.9 km^{2} (538.2 sq mi)	
Skeleton Rock	0 (SAL 2016)	1,025 km^{2} (396 sq mi)	
South Bodallin	20 (SAL 2021)	449.4 km^{2} (173.5 sq mi)	
South Yilgarn	15 (SAL 2021)	737.1 km^{2} (284.6 sq mi)	
Southern Cross	572 (SAL 2021)	555.2 km^{2} (214.4 sq mi)	
Turkey Hill	9 (SAL 2021)	540.9 km^{2} (208.8 sq mi)	
Yellowdine	0 (SAL 2021)	1,767 km^{2} (682 sq mi)	

== Former towns ==
- Noongar

== Notable councillors ==
- William Oats, Southern Cross Municipality mayor 1895–1896; later a state MP
- Harold Seddon, Southern Cross Municipality councillor late 1910s; later a state MP
- Lionel Kelly, Yilgarn Road Board member 1929–1932, 1932–1943; later a state MP
- John Panizza, Shire of Yilgarn councillor 1975–1987, president 1982–1987; later a senator

== Heritage-listed places ==
As of 2023, 116 places are heritage-listed in the Shire of Yilgarn, of which 15 are on the State Register of Heritage Places.
