= Liberty Clock =

Clock in Soho, London

Coordinates: 51°30′52″N 0°08′19″W

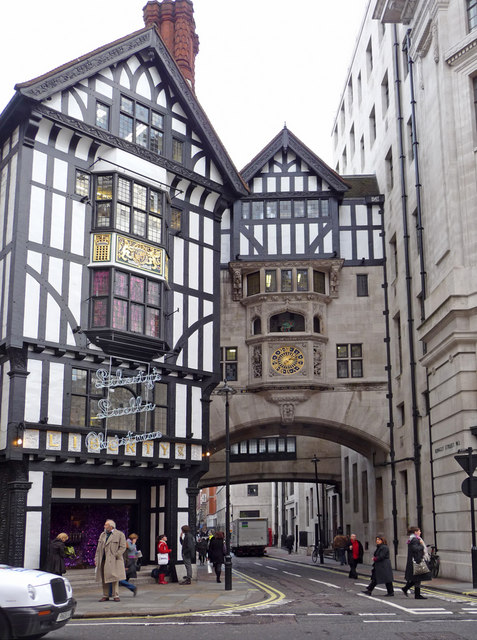
Western portion of the Liberty store showing the masonry arch that houses the Liberty clock

The Liberty Clock is a mechanical clock that was completed in 1925 (100 years ago). The clock forms part of, and protrudes from, the three storey archway that spans the northern end of the Kingly Street mall in Soho, Central London. The archway itself is part of the western end of the Great Marlborough Street Liberty department store. The entire building was a design by Edwin T. Hall and his son Edwin S. Hall in 1922 and is an example of the Tudor revival that was quite fashionable in late nineteenth and early twentieth century architecture.

== Design ==
The clock face is round and slightly recessed into the stonework. It is a deep blue in colour and is decorated by concentric gold bands either side of the numbering that runs around the perimeter of the face. There is a depiction of the radiant sun, also in gold, that occupies the bulk of the centre of the face. The clock is numbered with similarly golden, radially oriented Roman numerals in an otherwise plain serif typeface. The hands are ornate, coloured gold and feature deep blue insets.

Its surrounds are masonry and stand proud of the masonry portion of the archway with relief panels either side. Set into the relief panels are stone sculptures of birds. The bird on the left panel, which depicts dawn and daylight, is a cockerel with the sunrise behind it. The nocturnal owl on the right panel also features the moon and depicts night. Around the clock face, in each of the four corners, are winged heads representing each of the four winds. Above the clock itself is an opening in the stone that houses, and provides shelter for, a mechanical depiction of Saint George engaging the dragon. This activates at fifteen minute intervals, ending on the hour with the dragon being "slain". Under the clock face, in golden upper case letters, is the statement:

No minute gone comes ever back again
take heed and see ye nothing do in vain

== Maintenance ==
The clock and the mechanical display above were fully restored in 2010 by Gillett & Johnston.

== Influences ==
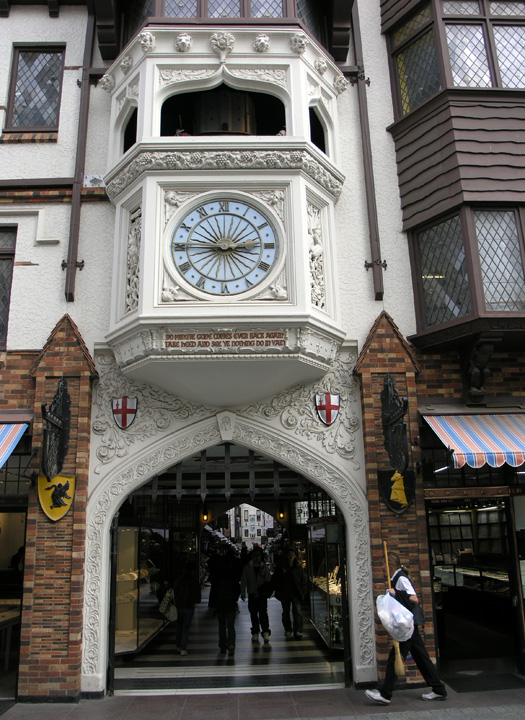
London Court entrance with clock and mechanised animation.

The clock has self evidently influenced the design of the archway and clock that presides over the northern entrance to London Court in Perth, Western Australia, which was constructed over ten years later in a similar style. It bears the exact same phrase underneath and also shows a mechanised animation above, but of jousting horses; a mechanised animation of Saint George and the dragon is present, but at the southern end of the mall.
