= CRA Building =

Demolished building in Melbourne, Victoria

- Interactive map of the CRA Building area

General information
- Type: Office
- Location: Melbourne, Australia
- Coordinates: 37°48′52.17″S 144°58′14.25″E
- Construction started: 1959
- Completed: 1962
- Demolished: 1988

Height
- Roof: 99 m (325 ft)

Technical details
- Floor count: 26

Design and construction
- Architects: Bernard Evans and Partners

The CRA Building (also known as CRA House, Consolidated Zinc Building and Comalco House), located at 89–101 Collins Street (aka 95 Collins Street), was a curtain-walled office building in the international style, designed by Bernard Evans and Partners for Conzinc Riotinto of Australia. When completed in 1962 it was the tallest building in Melbourne, a mantle it held until 1969 when it was surpassed by AMP Square in the western end of the city. When it was demolished in 1988, it was the youngest major building and the first skyscraper to be demolished in the city.

The CRA was the first truly high-rise office building to be built within the Hoddle Grid; at 26 floors, it was 10 storeys taller than the other new office towers within the CBD, and as the first tower on top of the Collins Street hill in the eastern half of the city it was a very prominent in distant views. As an International style skyscraper it was built as an almost free standing building, with a plaza / garden setback to the street, which was beset by strong winds due to the downdraft formed by the sheer face of the building catching strong northerlies. With its vertical ribbing emphasising its vertical proportions, and the setback interrupting the highly valued historic streetscape of the 'Paris End' of Collins Street, by the 1970s it was seen to be out of place, and it was not missed when it was demolished in 1988.

It made way for the 57-storey 101 Collins Street development, completed in March 1991, designed by Denton Corker Marshall.
