= London Court =

Shopping arcade in Perth, Western Australia

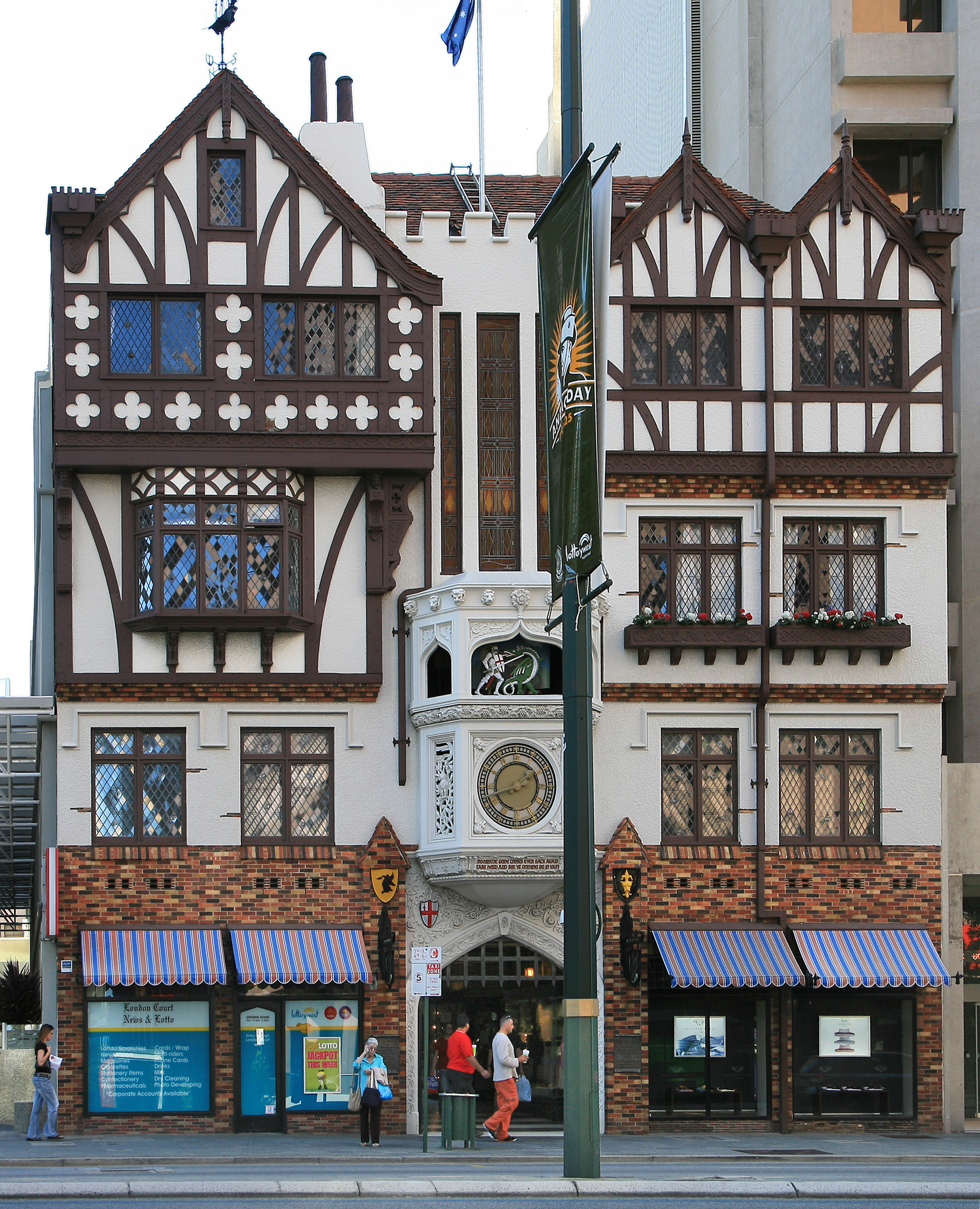
- St Georges Tce facade and entrance in 2007
- Location: Perth, Western Australia
- Coordinates: 31°57′17″S 115°51′32″E
- Opened: 29 July 1937; 89 years ago
- Owner: Fragrance Group Ltd
- Website: Official website

Western Australia Heritage Register
- Type: State Registered Place
- Designated: 8 October 1996
- Reference no.: 1998

London Court is a four-level mock Tudor open shopping arcade located in the central business district of Perth, Western Australia. It was built in 1937 by wealthy gold financier and businessman Claude de Bernales for residential and commercial purposes. The arcade runs between the Hay Street Mall and St Georges Terrace and is considered an important tourist attraction in the Perth CBD. It received a National Trust of Australia classification in 1978 and was recorded in the Register of the National Estate in 1982. The Heritage Council of Western Australia included it in the State Heritage Register in 1996.

London Court was owned by de Bernales until 1950, when it was sold to pastoralist brothers Henry and William Butcher for £A 210,000, equivalent to A$12.2 million in 2022. It remained in the ownership of the Butcher family until 2021, when it was sold to Singaporean property developer Fragrance Group Ltd for A$28.4 million.

== Description ==
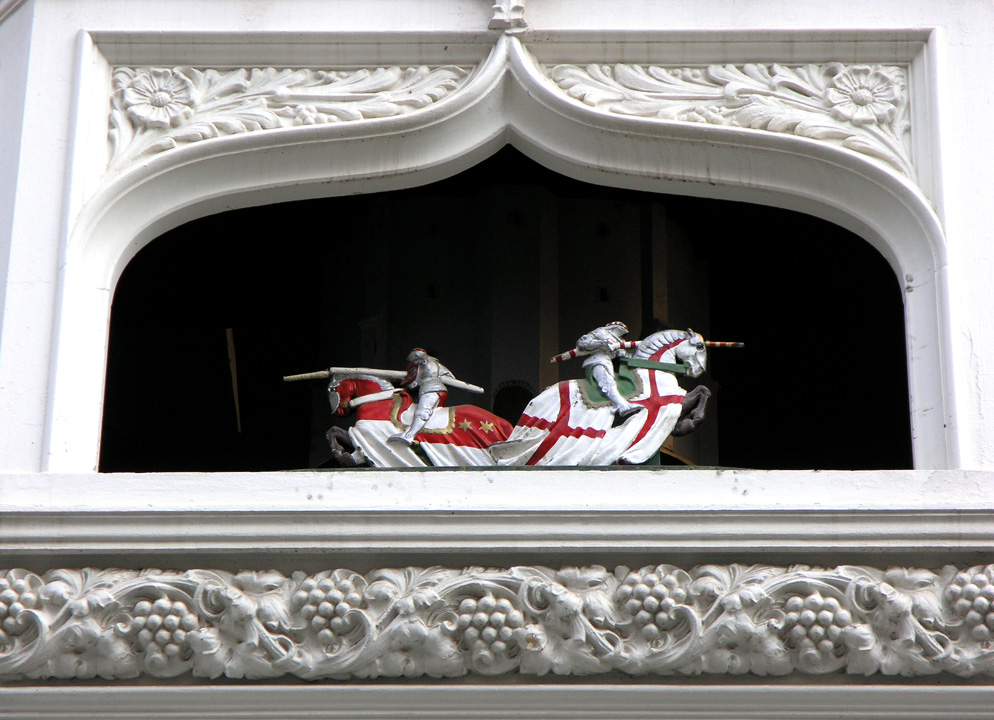
Jousting knights

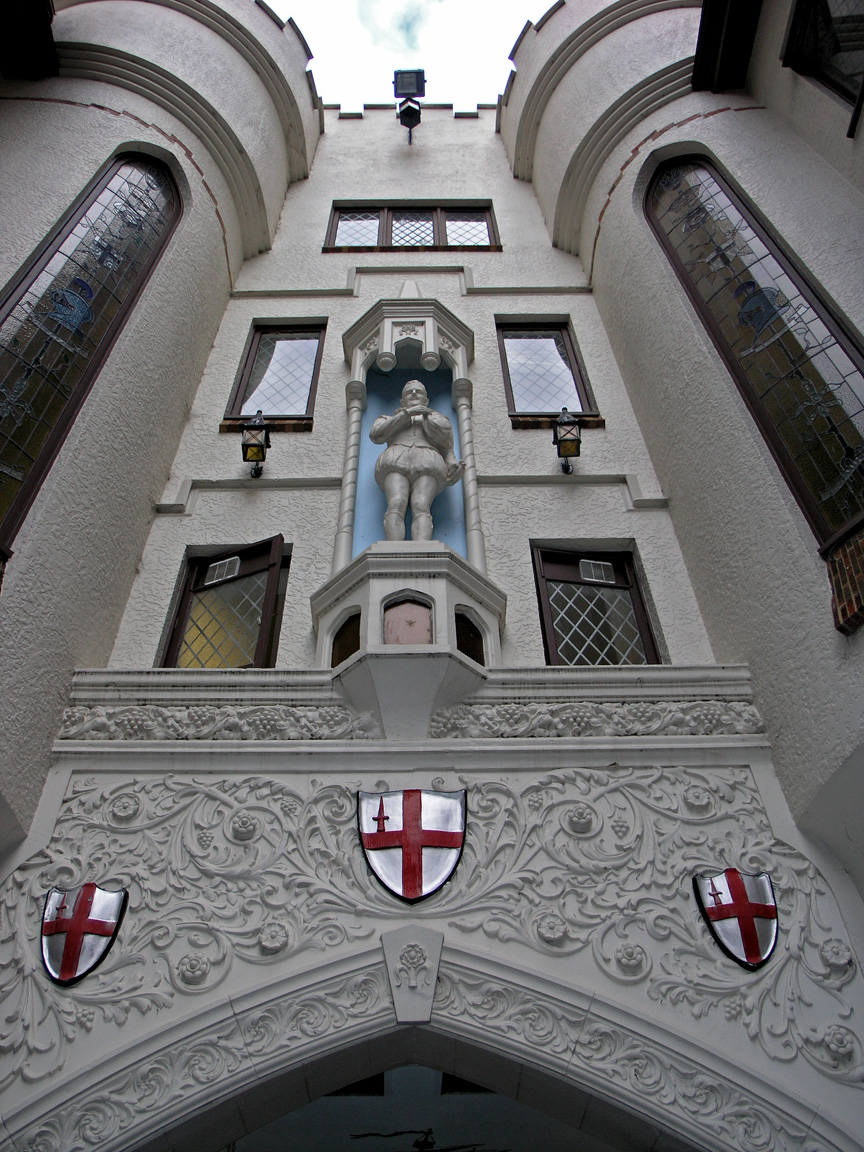
Statue of Sir Walter Raleigh peering down from the interior of the arcade

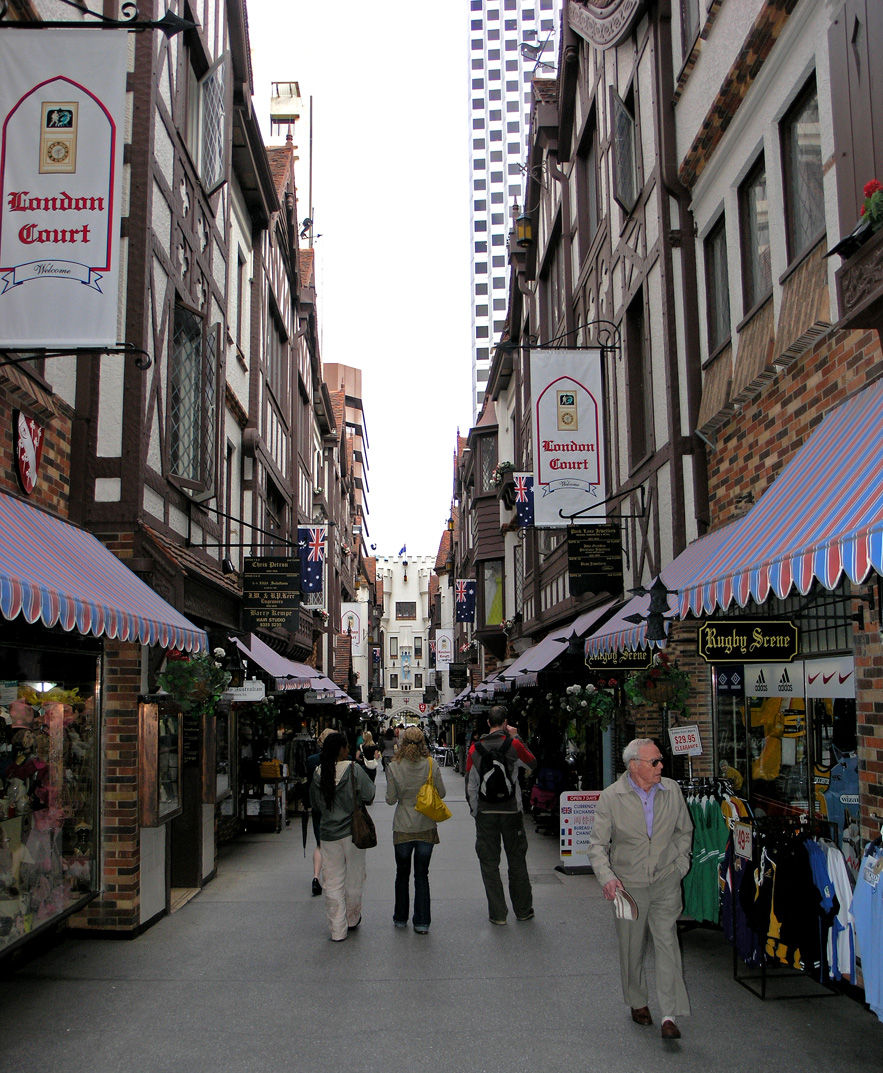
Shoppers in the arcade

The distinctive mock-Tudor/Elizabethan façade and architectural features include ornate entrances with large wrought-iron gates at each end. At the Hay Street end at the first storey level, a large clock chimes every quarter-hour, half-hour and on the hour. Four mechanised knights appear from a castle door and move in a semicircle each time the clock chimes as they apparently joust with each other. At the St Georges Terrace end, a window above another clock face depicts a mechanised miniature Saint George doing battle with the dragon. The clocks were made by the Synchronome Company of London at a cost of £5,000 ($8969.35 in Australian dollars).

The two interior ends include statues of Dick Whittington and his cat (north end) and Sir Walter Raleigh (south end), each in bastion towers and gazing down on the shoppers below. Other distinctive features include gargoyles, masks, shields, crests and wrought iron signs and brackets. Gabled roofs, weather cocks and lead lighting add to the Tudor style. The arcade floor is laid with terracotta tiles.

Originally, the arcade included 24 residential flats in the upper levels as well as 53 shops and 55 offices. Most of the residences have now been taken over for commercial purposes. The arcade currently houses mainly small speciality retail shops and cafes.

== Design influences ==
Whilst the court itself is a late arrival in the Tudor Revival, the northern entrance is influenced by the Liberty Clock that was constructed as part of the Liberty department store over 10 years previously on Great Marlborough Street in Central London. The London Court clock bears a similar mechanised animation above, as well as the same warning against "squandering time" that sits below.

== Construction ==
The arcade is situated on land that was previously a collection of alleys known as Gun Alley and owned by former Perth mayor Thomas Molloy. Claude de Bernales acquired the properties from Molloy in February 1935 for the Australian Machinery and Investment Co. Ltd for £75,000 (A$7.4 million in 2019). The arcade was conceived by de Bernales as an important link between Perth Railway Station in Wellington Street and The Esplanade.

De Bernales engaged Melbourne architect Bernard Evans to design the arcade in association with local consulting firms Oldham, Boas and Ednie-Brown, Architects. Structural engineering consultant was Clive Steele of Melbourne. Construction commenced in August 1936 and took less than 12 months to complete at a cost of £80,000.

The building was constructed using quite modern building techniques for its time, and featured an air-conditioning system not previously seen in the state and a large restaurant for tenants and visitors in the basement level. A dedicated postal and laundry service was incorporated.

== Opening ==
Lieutenant governor and former premier Sir James Mitchell opened the arcade at a lavish ceremony on 29 July 1937. Mitchell described the arcade as being "unique in Australia" and claimed that it "would be an ornament to the city".

The opening was celebrated with a three-day "Ye Olde English Fayre", which attracted several thousand visitors and raised £2,000 for the new Perth Hospital at St Georges Terrace and Irwin Street. The Fayre featured volunteers dressed in Elizabethan style costumes and included evening dramatic programmes and musical items, including excerpts from Twelfth Night, madrigals and folk singing.
