= Sheridan Close Apartment Block =

Coordinates: 37.8425°S 144.9783°E

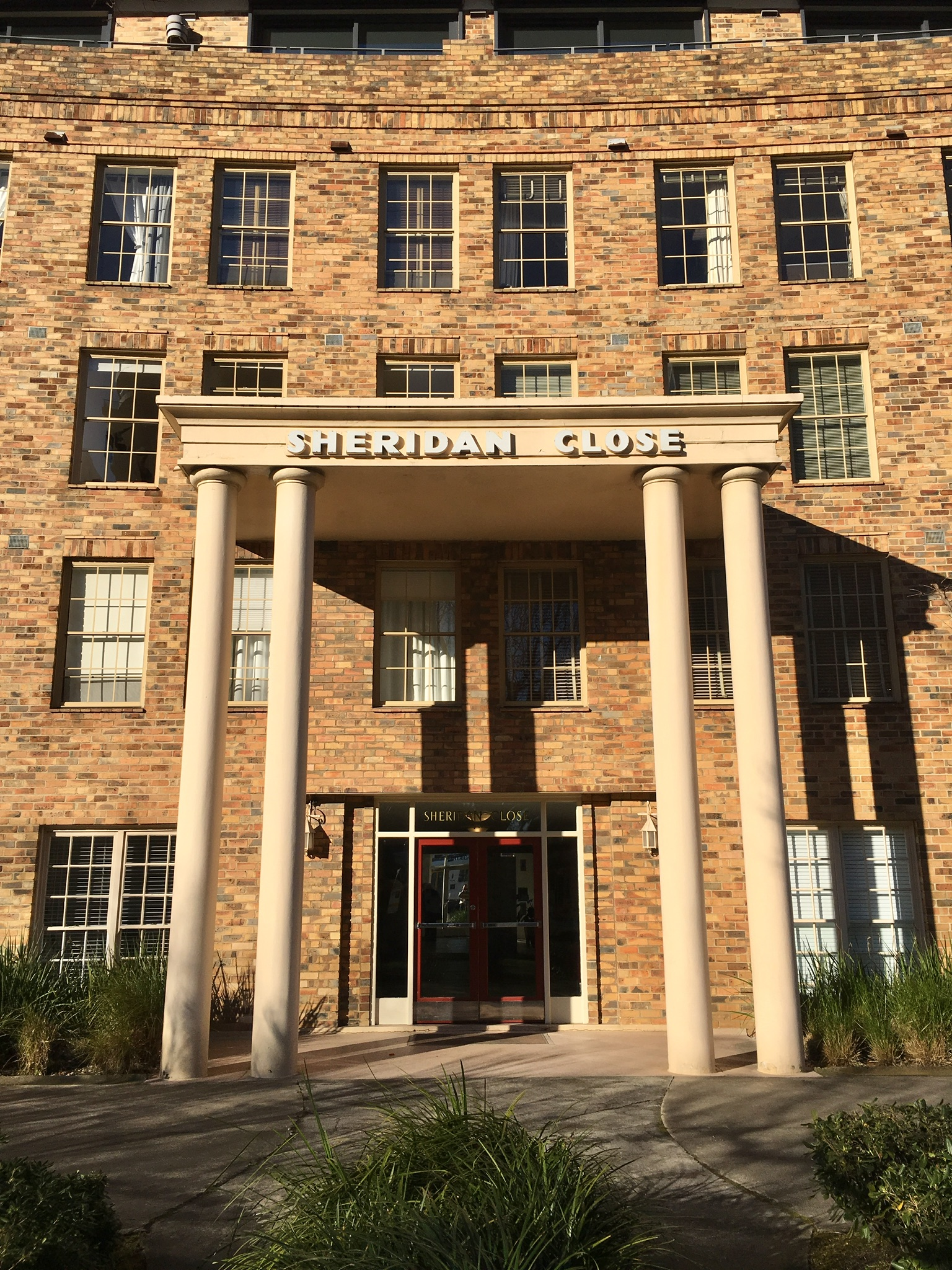
Sheridan Close St Kilda Road Portico

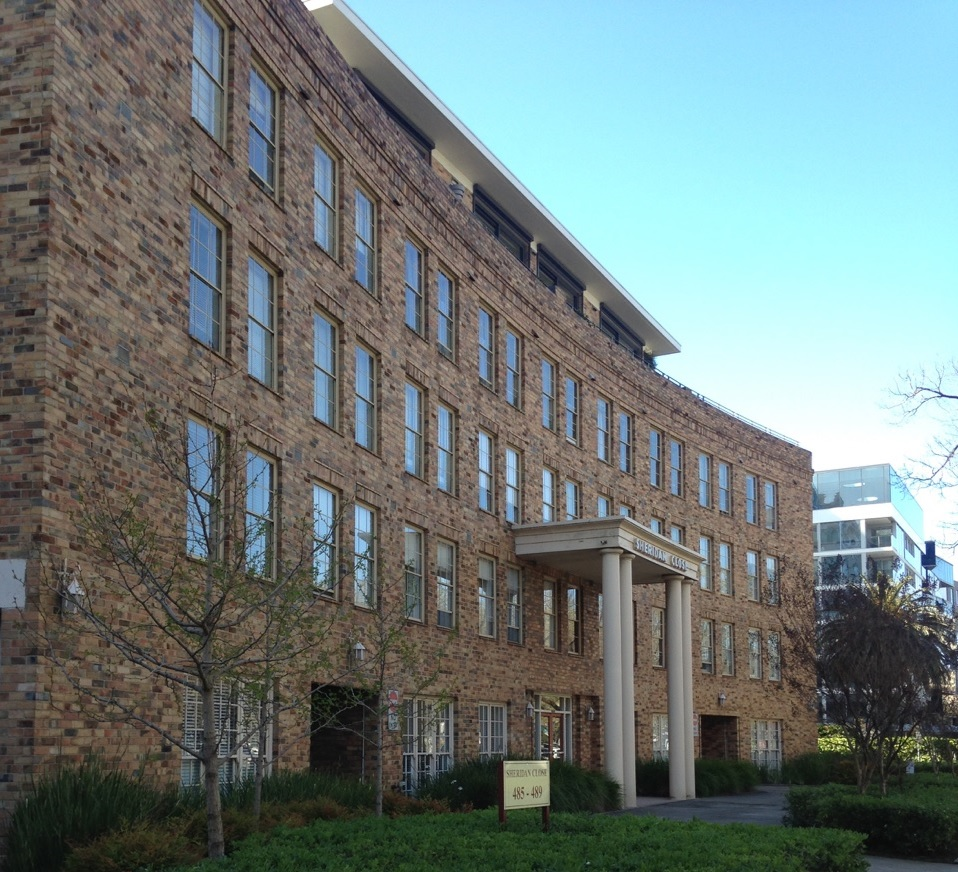
This photograph depicts the concave, regency facade fronting St Kilda Road, Melbourne

Sheridan Close is a low-rise apartment complex situated on 485–489 St Kilda Road, Melbourne, Victoria, Australia. It has direct access onto Fawkner Park at the rear of the building. It was designed by the architect Sir Bernard Evans, who later became Lord Mayor of Melbourne (between 1959 and 1961), and was built by Prentice Builders. Sheridan Close is described as "a stylistic hybrid", combining a concave regency façade, Georgian proportioned windows and Art Deco influences, with serrated side elevations to ensure views of St Kilda Road.

== History of the building ==
Designed in 1950, and completed in 1953, Sheridan Close was, at the time, Melbourne's biggest co-op flat block, completed at a cost of £500,000 and consisting of a 4-storey 78-unit complex. It is situated at 485–489 St Kilda Road, Melbourne, and has private gated access onto Fawkner Park. The flats, which were launched to the public in 1951 and conceived on the shared ownership (company title) principle, were described by The Master Builders' Weekly as having been introduced at a time when "the self-ownership principle was the only answer to the problem created by inflated building costs which prevented an economic return on investment in flats for rent". The cost of the flats originally ranged between £4,000 to £7,500, depending on the size and location of the apartment. As company title properties, flat ownership is controlled by a Constitution, which provides for levies and rules. Property transfers require Board approval, which cannot be withheld from an honest, responsible and solvent transferee. Flats may be rented, but persons may own one flat only. Application may be made for keeping of pets.

== Description ==
The apartments, which contain a variety of 1, 2 and 3 bedroom flats and a 4 bedroom penthouse, are designed, in a hollow oblong, around a central garden piazza. The apartment complex consists of 4 stairwells (2 of which are enclosed in brick and glass towers), lift access, undercover parking, locker storage and communal laundry. The building is constructed of a light coloured brick and concrete, built on circular columns, with internal balconies running the perimeter of the internal building wall. The building's façade on St Kilda Road consists of a concave brick exterior, with a porch supported by two pairs of white columns, upon which the signage "Sheridan Close" is illuminated. The original designs for Sheridan Close also conceived a café, tuckshop, and kitchen, a trunk storage room, lounge, and a change room for residents returning from the park. Many of these original design ideas were altered during the build process, with the tuckshop and café converted to a caretaker's flat, and the temporary on-site architect and builders' offices converted to a penthouse.

== Key influences & design approach ==
Sheridan Close reflects Sir Bernard Evans' advocacy for greater open spaces in urban environments, and new buildings set back from the street, to save the city from becoming "a dull, dusty jungle", as well as his development of shared-ownership buildings and the "own-your-own" concept in flats.

== Construction ==
The flats were constructed by Prentice Builders, who were also responsible for such buildings as The Baillieu Library at the University of Melbourne, the Brighton Municipal Offices and the re-developed Prahran Market. Sheridan Close was also built during a period in which the mansions of St Kilda Road and Queens Road were replaced with moderne or period revival-style flats, with two properties demolished to make way for the apartments.

== Reception and recognition ==
The flats were completed in 1953 to a generally positive reception.

The Herald praised its "lovely Regency façade", "echelon sides" and its open base, described as being "in the style of Charles Le Corbusier...one of the arch'ts of the mighty UN bldg".

The Australian Builder described Sheridan Close as "a fine building, which enhances the beauty of one of Australia's most handsome thoroughfares", noting its "imposing façade", the "light coloured brick of pleasing appearance" and compared it to "a community centre, smacking somewhat of a garden village surrounding a village green, and ideally situated".

The Master Builders' Weekly acknowledged its location between St Kilda Road and Fawkner Park, noting that it "has thus two frontages in one of the most valuable areas just outside the city" and describing the architect Sir Bernard Evans as "a pioneer in Melbourne of this class of building".

The flats also attracted notable persons such as the architect Leslie M Perrott Senior of Perrott Lyon Mathieson, described as the leading designer of Melbourne's grand hotels, who left the house he had designed as his own residence in fashionable Brighton to move to Sheridan Close, at the time a new block of flats, that he particularly admired.

More recently, Sheridan Close has been recognised by the prominent architectural academic Philip Goad as "a stylistic hybrid" for its combination of Regency porch, concave brick façade and Georgian-proportioned windows, which he described as a "clear flaunting of contemporary architectural tastes".

Heritage Victoria acknowledged Sheridan Close's heritage significance in its comprehensive 2008 study by Heritage Alliance, Melbourne, noting its importance as one of the first large blocks of flats to be built in Melbourne and "designed by the prolific architect (and one-time Lord Mayor) who largely introduced the typology into Victoria".

== Notable residents ==
Notable owners and/or residents of Sheridan Close include:

- Leslie M Perrott Senior (of Perrott Lyon Mathieson), the leading designer of Melbourne's grand hotels;
- Norman Banks, a longstanding Melbourne broadcaster and founder of Carols by Candlelight;
- Kathleen Alice Syme OBE, a journalist and editor of The Age, which was also the newspaper founded by her grandfather David Syme. The Kathleen Syme Library and Community Centre in Carlton, Melbourne was named in her honour;
- Dr Joseph Ringland Anderson MC, a World War I recipient of the Military Cross, medical practitioner, author of several books and after whom the University of Melbourne's 'Ringland Anderson Chair of Ophthalmology' was named. Dr Ringland Anderson was also recognised for his contribution to the ballet, creating moving pictures of the Ballets Russes tours in Australia during the 1930s. The footage is currently held by The Australian Ballet, to whom it was donated after Dr Ringland Anderson's death;
- Henry Barton Borwick MC, a World War I recipient of the Military Cross;
- Commander Lionel Robinson, member of the Royal Australian Navy and President of the Victorian Chamber of Manufacturers.
- Gertrude Luxton, wife of Thomas Luxton, owner of McEwans Hardware, and from 1937 owner of Coolart Homestead, declared a sanctuary for native game under State of Victoria legislation that same year. In 1977 Coolart Homestead was formally transferred to public ownership. The original house 'Coolart' was built by Melbourne industrialist Frederick Grimwade in 1895.
- Alexander Mair, 26th Premier of New South Wales, and his wife Grace Mair were residents from 1953 until their deaths in 1969 and 1978 respectively
