= Claude de Bernales =

Australian mining entrepreneur

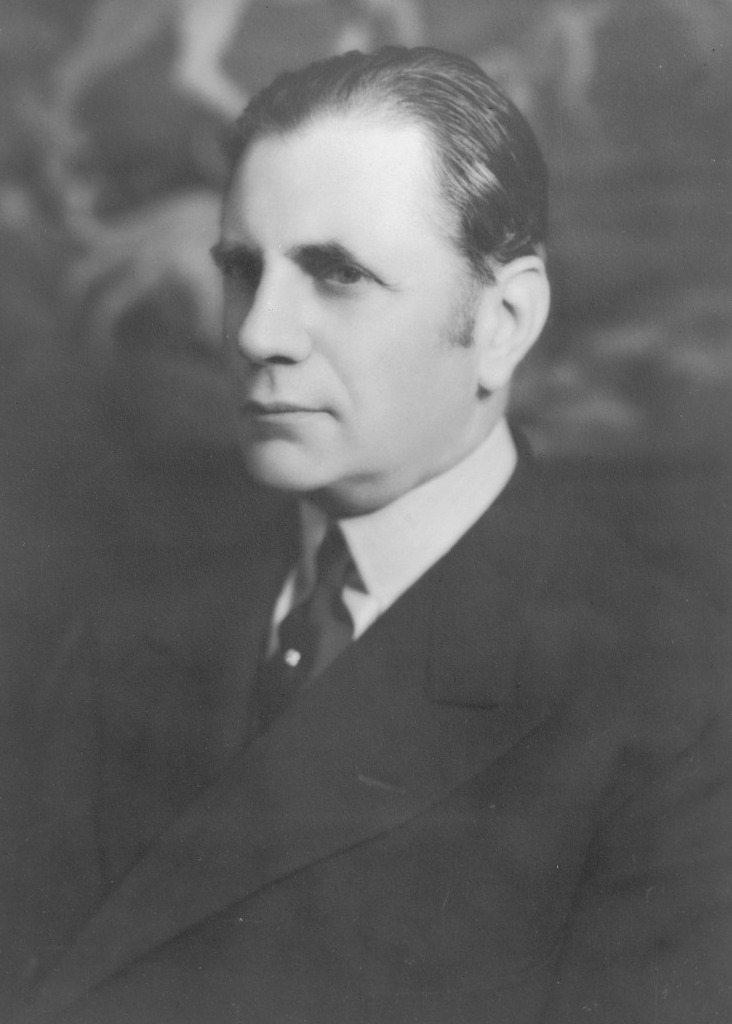
- de Bernales in 1935 (?)
- Born: 31 May 1876; Brixton, London
- Died: 9 December 1963 (aged 87); Chelsea, London
- Occupation: Mining promoter
- Spouse(s): Bessie Picken Berry, Helen Florence Berry (née Pincknie)
- Children: Beryl (d. 1923), Daphne Isobel Albo, Elizabeth Marguerita Albo (Betty)
- Parent(s): Manuel Edgar Albo de Bernales, Emma Jane Belden

Claude Albo de Bernales (31 May 1876 – 9 December 1963) was a British-born Western Australian mining entrepreneur whose business activities and marketing did much to stimulate investment in Western Australia during the early years of the twentieth century. During the 1930s gold production in the State increased from £1,600,000 to £11,800,000 and employment in the industry quadrupled due in considerable part to de Bernales' marketing of the goldfields to overseas investors.

De Bernales accumulated immense wealth through complex and elaborate schemes by which he acquired many mining companies and attracted overseas investment and personal support. In the latter part of his life however, financial difficulties and ill-health saw him live as a recluse in Selsey, Sussex, United Kingdom.

== Early life ==
De Bernales was born in Brixton, London, the son of a Syracuse, New York-born Basque, Manuel Edgar Albo de Bernales, and his American wife Emma Jane, née Belden. He was educated at a variety of schools in the US, Britain and Europe, including one year (1891) at Uppingham School in Rutland in the East Midlands of England, and later at Neuenheim College (now called Heidelberg College) in Heidelberg in the Rhineland, Germany.

In 1897 de Bernales emigrated to the Western Australian goldfields, drawn like many other European immigrants to the lure of the gold rush of the region.

== Goldfields ==
His first job was running Western Machinery Company, Limited, which supplied and financed various mining machinery purchases for the hundreds of large and small gold mining companies in the region.

On 19 May 1903 de Bernales married Bessie Picken Berry at Kalgoorlie.

His business contacts continued to expand and in 1909 became managing director of a major mining plant supplier, Kalgoorlie Foundry, Ltd. In 1911, he purchased The Laurels, a Federation Queen Anne style house in Cottesloe, renaming it Overton Lodge after the house in Brixton, London, where he was born. In 1938 he redeveloped it into an ostentatious Inter-war Spanish Mission style mansion. The house and its grounds are now the Cottesloe Civic Centre. In 1912 he became a director of foundry operators Hoskins & Co, Ltd in Perth.

During this time, he developed his forté as a mining promoter while acquiring leases through defaults by some of his clients at Kalgoorlie and Wiluna. These leases were eventually used to form the Wiluna Gold Mines company which he owned jointly with several overseas companies including Consolidated Gold Fields of South Africa.

In 1926 he went to London and raised £1 million to develop the Wiluna leases. A later issue of promissory notes for £300,000 was backed by the State government, after de Bernales fostered a close alliance with the Governor of Western Australia, Colonel Sir William Campion. Campion would later become a close business associate and took chairmanship roles of a number of de Bernales' companies including Anglo-Australian Gold Development Co. and Commonwealth Mining and Finance Co. Ltd.

Following Bessie's death in 1927, de Bernales married Helen Florence Berry (née Pincknie - the war widow of his first wife's brother, mining engineer James Webster Berry), in Colombo in January 1928, then later on 5 February 1930 at St Phillips, Cottesloe.

Using London capital, the Wiluna mines were expanded and by 1934, 10,000 people had settled there and gold worth £3 million had been extracted. The Wiluna mine ultimately earned £12 million and provided an impetus for other mines in the region.

With the onset of the Great Depression, de Bernales campaigned for government support of the gold mining industry, arguing that investment would enable the industry to continue to operate throughout the depression as unemployment rose to 25%. He devised a gold bonus campaign, where the Federal government would pay a 'bounty' of £1 an ounce on gold produced in excess of the 1928-30 average. Not surprisingly, the idea had widespread support from his fellow entrepreneurs and state government politicians. De Bernales led several delegations to the eastern states to lobby for the scheme which was known as the 'Gold Bounty Acts', but by the time it became law in 1930 and 1931, the exchange rate had collapsed and price of gold had risen to well above the rate of the bounty paid. Following the depression, in 1933 the state government granted temporary reserves over prospective gold areas in the eastern and northern goldfields to encourage new investment in gold development, primarily to Western Mining Corporation and to companies associated with de Bernales.

De Bernales moved to London in 1932, forming several investment companies which he promoted to seek new capital for mining leases on the new land reservations. Capital of £1,261,000 was raised, though much of the land was unproven. In 1933–35, yet more companies and another £6,110,000 was pumped into his leases. By now, de Bernales' fundraising represented a major proportion of overseas capital inflows for Australian mining and the Western Australian economy as a whole. In 1936, he won control of one of the oldest and richest mines of the 'Golden Mile', the Great Boulder Proprietary Gold Mine. He also developed new mines at Mount Palmer which returned £200,000 to investors in the first 2 years and to the north at Marble Bar.

In 1935-36 he returned to Western Australia with ex-governor Campion, being feted by local politicians acknowledging his ambassadorial role for the state. At that time he acquired properties in Melbourne and Perth and commissioned the well-known London Court shopping arcade in the Perth CBD.

De Bernales returned to London, but from 1939 his empire started to encounter difficulties. The Great Boulder mine went into liquidation and its shareholders sought recovery of their losses, accusing de Bernales of mismanagement. The London Stock Exchange suspended trading in several of his companies in July 1939 which sent them also into liquidation. An extensive investigation into de Bernales' Commonwealth Group of companies by Sir William McClintock for the Board of Trade was made during 1939 and 1940. This uncovered income tax liabilities from share dealings on profits of £1,382,000. These were however, never brought to trial as the case arguments dragged on for ten years. Between 1945 and 1948, the official receiver undertook further investigations but partly due to his failing health the claims were finally settled for just £125,000. In the meantime, a concerted attack campaign by Lord Beaverbrook's influential Daily Express continued.

== Later life ==
De Bernales became a recluse at his home The White House, a house with private beach in Selsey, Sussex, near Chichester. His second wife Helen Florence died there on 27 May 1956. De Bernales died at the Chelsea, London home of one of his daughters, on 9 December 1963, survived by daughters Daphne and Betty, from his first marriage. One of his grandchildren was Anthony Trethowan, who became a member of the Western Australian parliament.
