= David Wang (Australia) =

Australian politician

David Neng Hwan Wang (12 February 1920 – 1 January 1978), was a Chinese-Australian businessman and the first Chinese-Australian elected to the Melbourne City Council.

Wang was born in Haimen county, Jiangsu province, China, the son of a prosperous peasant farmer, and studied radio communications in Shanghai before entering the military academy in Chongqing (Chungking), (then the temporary capital of China) in 1939. Promoted lieutenant in 1941, he served in the intelligence section of the general headquarters. Following the outbreak of World War II in the Pacific, he was sent to Australia as a captain with the Chinese military mission.

In Melbourne in 1942 he met Mabel Chen, an Australian-born Chinese, who chose the English name David for him. In 1947 they were married in Singapore, where he opened a business importing woollen goods from Australia. These connections to Australia enabled him to gain a seven-year Australian business residence permit in 1948, despite the then-official White Australia Policy, which prevented Asian immigration. The permit was issued by the Immigration Minister Arthur Calwell, who became a close friend of the Wang family, despite his lifelong support for White Australia. He opened his furniture business in Little Bourke Street in 1950.

The business grew rapidly and by the 1960s Wang was a leading businessman and a leader of the Chinese community. The Australian Dictionary of Biography notes:

"Anticipating a growing taste for oriental wares, they prospered almost immediately, obtaining Chinese goods through a Hong Kong agent, and later importing from Taiwan, Japan, the Philippines, Malaysia, Thailand and the Pacific Islands, and, after 1972, mainland China. The Wangs largely pioneered the trade in Chinese cane-ware, bamboo blinds, camphorwood chests, and arts and crafts. Fireworks were among their most lucrative earners. In 1962, wishing to make his first overseas business trip on an Australian passport, David applied for naturalisation six months before he had completed the required fifteen years residence, and succeeded on appeal. He purchased and demolished the Canton Building in Little Bourke Street, erecting in its place a modern emporium, opened in 1964 by Calwell."

In 1965 Wang, on the nomination of Calwell (whose electorate covered the City of Melbourne), was appointed one of the first two Chinese-Australian Justices of the Peace in Australia. In 1969 he was elected to the Melbourne City Council, becoming the first Chinese-Australian to win a seat in local government. As a Councillor he led the push for the extension of shopping hours and the establishment of new parks in the city, and worked on the approval of Melbourne's Chinatown Project.

"Wang campaigned for election to Melbourne City Council, basing his campaign on revitalising inner-city Melbourne, particularly its night life, and injecting an international flavour into the city. As a leader in the Chinese community he had initiated Melbourne’s Chinatown project in 1960 and in 1970 he revived it as a councillor. The Chinese quarter in Melbourne, centred in Little Bourke Street, had been in decline and Wang believed that its transformation with pagodas, archways and suitable lighting would attract tourists and shoppers, as well as promoting Chinese culture. Chinatown was launched in 1976."

Wang served on many other community bodies and was Foundation Chairman of the Dai Loong Association. In 1975-77 he was chairman of the Chinese Professional and Business Association of Victoria. It was widely expected that he would be elected as Lord Mayor of Melbourne, but his early death from a heart attack prevented this.

"Having experienced little personal prejudice in the business and professional milieux, [Wang] saw his advance as demonstrating the fairness of the Australian people, as distinct from the sometimes overbearing behaviour of the country's officialdom. Cautious and a gradualist, he condemned examples of racism in public life, welcomed the replacement of the White Australia policy by selective immigration, forecast a multi-racial nation, and supported an Asian immigration quota. In 1977 he described Australia as a cosmopolitan community and endorsed racial integration, including mixed marriages, arguing that the Australian Chinese should serve as a bridge of friendship between the two countries. The tolerance displayed by Australian youth made him optimistic about the future."
