= Mount Palmer, Western Australia =

Abandoned town in Western Australia

Mount Palmer
- Town
- Coordinates: 31°24′S 119°41′E
- Country: Australia
- State: Western Australia
- LGA(s): Shire of Yilgarn

Area
  - Total: 1,662.9 km^{2} (642.0 sq mi)

Population
  - Total(s): 0 (SAL 2016)

Mount Palmer was a town in the Yilgarn shire in Western Australia. It was founded in 1934 after the discovery of gold in the area. The Mount Palmer Gold Mine operated from 1934 to 1944, when it closed due to labour shortages caused by World War II. The town's existence was entirely dependent on the mine such that when the mine closed, the town was abandoned soon after.

The first 43 town blocks were auctioned in the Southern Cross courthouse raising £3969, with a further 24 block auction after surveyors had reserved areas for public amenities. At its peak, the population of Mt Palmer was estimated to have exceeded 500. The town had three hotels, two-up rings, a bakery, butcher and two boarding houses.

== Townsite ==
The Mount Palmer townsite was surveyed and gazetted in 1935 after gold was discovered in the area by Augustus Palmer, W Coulhoun and A Pollard. A number of names were suggested for the townsite including Palmer, Palmerdale, Palmerston but these were rejected due to similarities with other places. The surveyor general then proposed that the town be called Mount Palmer. The townsite is 415 km east of Perth and 46 km from Southern Cross.

== Mining ==
Mining commenced in the area during 1934. Initially mines were alluvial while syndicates were formed to establish deep shaft mines. Many of the miners came from the area leaving farms established in the 1920s under the Miners Phthisis act which granted farming land to gold miners who had been exposed to mining dust. These men lived in rough humpies and tents near the mines, amid going concerns of a typhoid outbreak led the government to survey the townsite. During 1935 Claude de Bernales commenced the construction of a 20 head battery. By 1937 85,000 tons of ore had been crushed with £470,000 worth of gold extracted. Employing just 130 men the operation returned £200,000 to investors in the first two years. By the end of 1942 most of the men had left the mine to join the army with the work force declining to 60. In June 1944 the mine closed at which stage the main shaft had reached 500 feet. The mine recorded a total production during its operation of 4928 kg of gold from 310,728 tons brought to the surface, although speculation about the actual amount of gold produced indicates that the figure was likely significantly higher.
