= Cottesloe Civic Centre =

Civic centre in Cottesloe, Western Australia

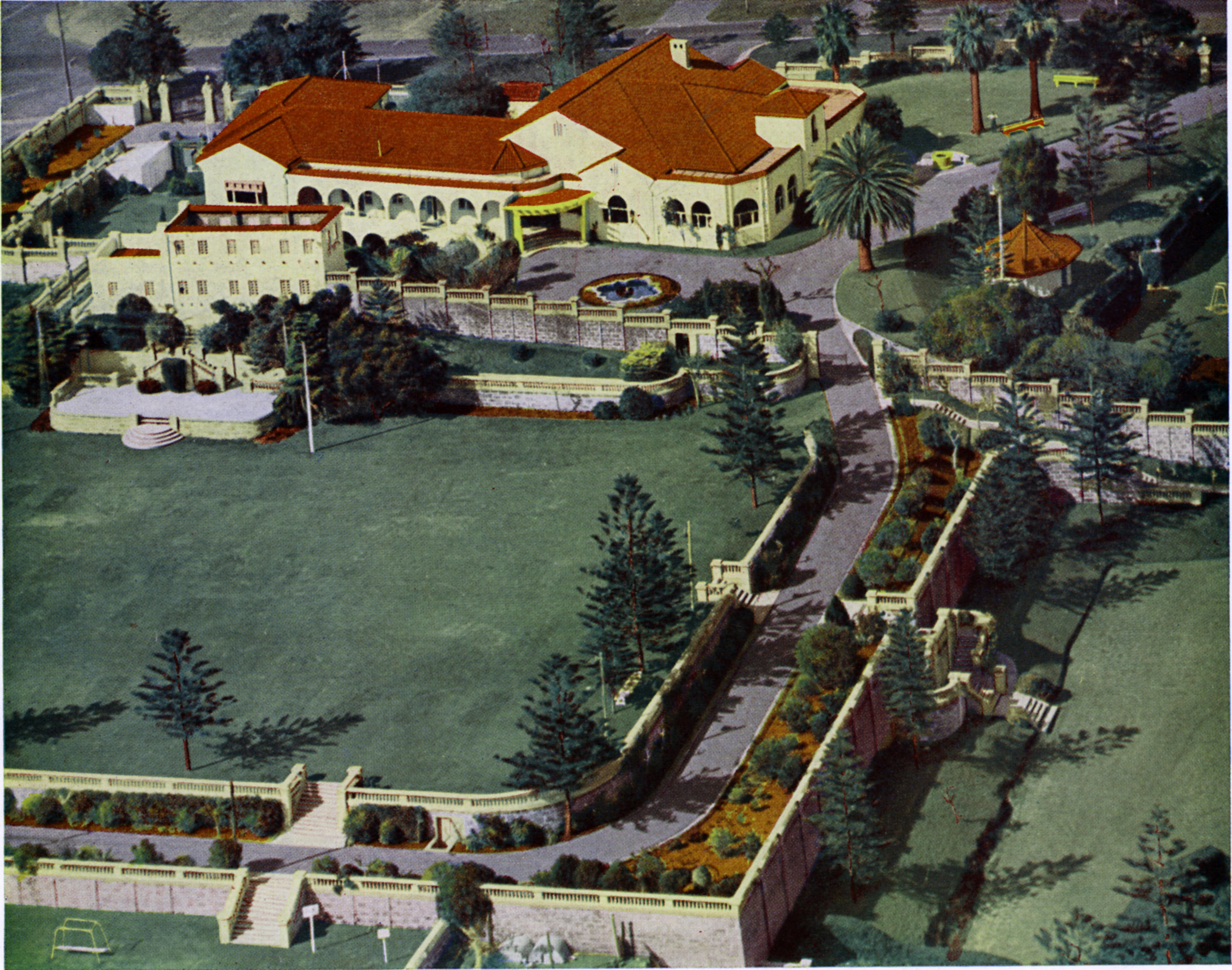
- Aerial View of the Cottesloe Civic Centre in 1950
- Interactive map of the Cottesloe Civic Centre area

General information
- Location: Cottesloe, Western Australia, Australia
- Coordinates: 31.993567°S 115.755695°E

Western Australia Heritage Register
- Type: State Registered Place
- Designated: 9 May 1997
- Reference no.: 593

The Cottesloe Civic Centre is situated on the corner of Broome and Napier streets in Cottesloe, a suburb of Perth, Western Australia. It is a local landmark featuring a substantial two storey building with white walls and an orange tiled roof in the Spanish Mission style. Over a 2-hectare (4.9-acre) area the site offers extensive views westwards over the Indian Ocean and is a popular venue for picnics, concerts, meetings and weddings. It includes the administration centre for the Town of Cottesloe, the War Memorial Town Hall and extensive walled and landscaped grounds with tall Norfolk Island pines.

The Laurels was originally built in 1897–1898 for Richard Pennefather. It was an elegant example of the Federation Queen Anne style. Claude de Bernales, a mining entrepreneur, bought the house in 1911 and renamed it Overton Lodge, after his birthplace in Brixton, London. In 1937 he redeveloped the house in the Spanish Mission Style. In 1950 it was bought by the Town of Cottesloe and remodelled again, this time for use as a civic centre. It is included on the State Register of Heritage Places for Western Australia and the Municipal Inventory for the Town of Cottesloe.

== 1898–1911 Pennefather Residence ==
In 1988, when Judge Richard W Pennefather built the house, there were few neighbouring properties and no proper road to it. Broome Street did not extend north beyond Forrest Street and sand dunes and bush surrounded the house. The house was named The Laurels and built of limestone quarried from the nearby Briggs quarry (subsequently the Council depot). The arches and lintels to the doors and windows were of brick and the house was surrounded by large verandahs. A latticed tank stand housed the water tanks capable of holding 83,000 litres (22,000 US gal) and a summer house stood to the south. At the time Pennefather was the Attorney General for Western Australia having been elected to the West Australian Legislative Council in 1897 as the member for Greenough. His headstone lies at the south west corner of the building and was relocated from Karrakatta cemetery.

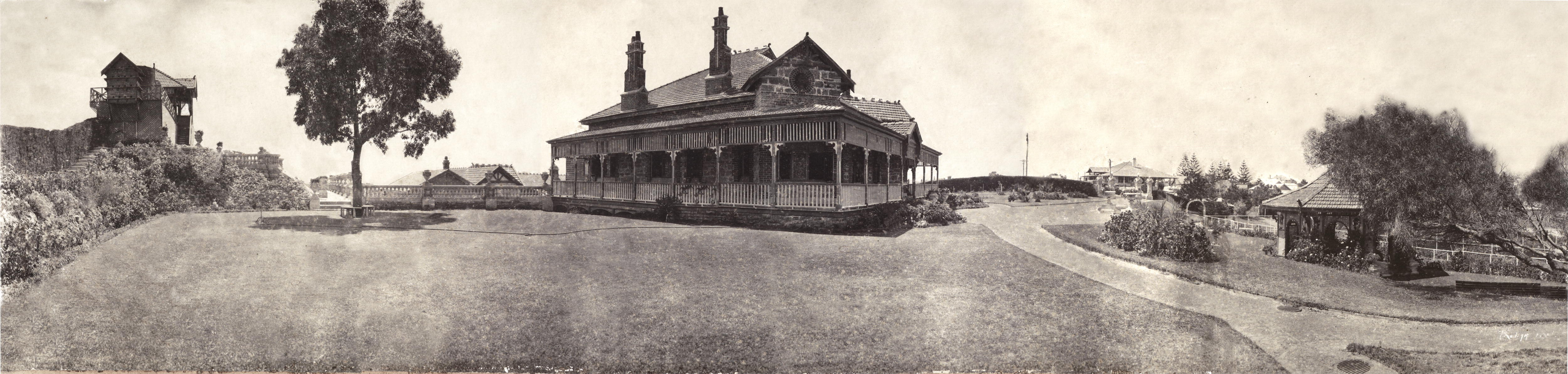
Overton Lodge in original Federation Queen Anne style, c. 1920

== 1911–1949 De Bernales Residence ==
In 1911 Pennefather sold the house to Claude Aldo de Bernales, a mining entrepreneur, and his wife Bessie. De Bernales at this time had amassed a modest fortune by dealing in mine machinery in the Western Australian gold fields and was managing director of Kalgoorlie Foundry Limited. He would go on to become immensely wealthy, organising complex investment schemes in mining companies and attracting significant investment to Western Australia's mining industry.

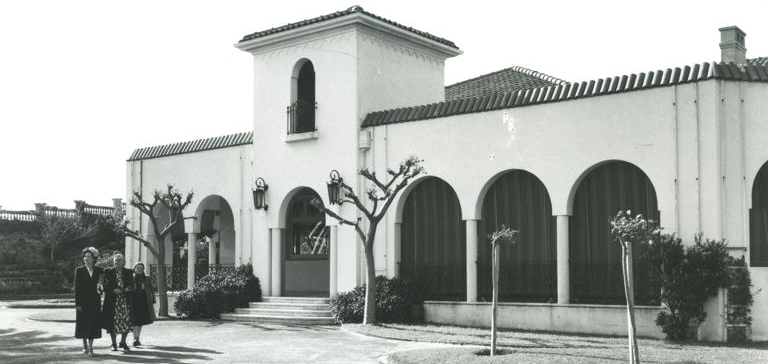
Cottesloe Civic Centre (Overton Lodge) in Spanish Mission style, c. 1950

By 1913 he had renamed the house Overton Lodge after his birthplace in Brixton, England. In the 1920s de Bernales added garages, a billiard room and made changes to the interior. He also began to make improvements to the grounds, establishing a large rose garden in the south west corner and probably the tennis court below the summer house. In 1936 he entered into an agreement with the Cottesloe Municipal Council to transform the land west from his property to Marine Parade into a model garden estate. The Overton Gardens Estate was to comprise 25 houses designed according to the latest ideas from England and the continent. The land was endowed for municipal purposes and housed the original courts of the Cottesloe Tennis Club adjacent to Warnham Road. The Reserves Act (no 32 of 1935) allowed for the sale of the land providing the proceeds of the sale were used to extend Napier Street to the coast, improve the recreational reserve to the north and relocate the tennis courts to their current site on Broome Street. While the tennis courts were moved, economic conditions and the outbreak of the war in 1939 meant that the model estate did not eventuate.

At the same time De Bernales commissioned Melbourne architect Bernard Evans to remodel the house. The plan involved a dramatic change in appearance from a Federation Queen Anne style to a Spanish Mission style. The alterations and additions included a study, library, dining room, kitchen and three new bedrooms with adjoining bathrooms. In the public rooms extensive use was made of French-polished jarrah panelling on the walls and ceilings and jarrah parquetry on the floors. Local architect Samuel Rosenthal is thought to have designed the jarrah panelling. The house was furnished with antiques and chandeliers featured in the reception hall. Surrounding sand dunes were levelled and soil trucked in from the Darling Ranges to establish expansive gardens and lawns to the west. A 1,100-metre (3,600 ft) Italianate balustrade wall designed by Rosenthal was also built and still surrounds the property. Massive water storage tanks holding 100,000 litres (26,000 US gal) that stood behind the house were retained and renovated in the Spanish style. The Spanish Tower became a landmark in Cottesloe.

The building was completed by 1938. His daughter Daphne Faye and her husband returned to live in the house. De Bernales by this time had returned to London and was involved in disputes with shareholders and in 1939 the London Stock Exchange suspended his companies. De Bernales returned to Western Australia only once post-war and it appears he had no opportunity to live in his Spanish mansion. In 1949 the decision was taken to sell Overton Lodge.

== 1949+ Cottesloe Civic Centre ==
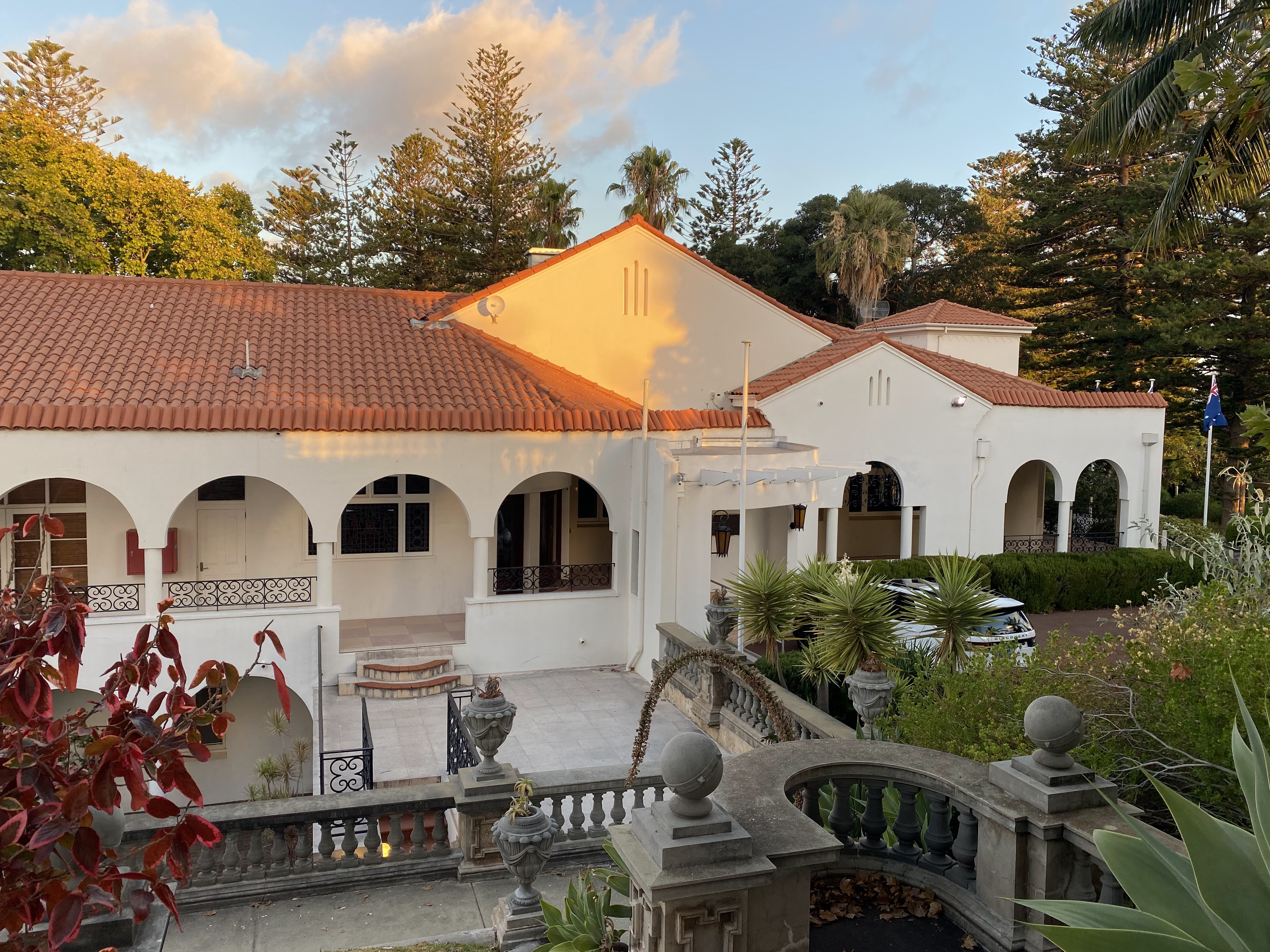
The Civic Centre in 2023

In June 1949 Harold Boas approached the Cottesloe Municipal Council with a proposal to sell Overton Gardens to the council. Mayor Laurence Gadsdon and Shire Clerk Alex Smith recognised the opportunity the estate offered as a Civic Centre. In October 1949 the council approved the purchase of the property for £A 45,000, equivalent to A$2.85 million in 2022. The sale included Overton Gardens, the land to the west of Overton Lodge, which had been destined for use as a model housing estate. The sale of this land helped to offset the cost of the purchase.

The house was remodelled to serve as a Civic Centre. The jarrah lined lounge, library and reception hall were combined to become the War Memorial Town Hall and the dining room the Council chambers. Children's playgrounds were built and the water tanks demolished having been declared unsafe, retaining only the empty structure of the Spanish Tower. On 30 September 1950 a crowd of 3,000 gathered to celebrate the official opening and a grand ball was held in the evening.

The new Civic Centre provided much needed facilities for community groups. Among them was the Cottesloe sub-branch of the RSL. The branch had contributed funds for the alterations of the centre and in exchange was given the use of the billiard room with its attractive jarrah panels and lead light windows for its meetings. The branch continues to meet there today. One of the upstairs bedrooms was converted to a Children's Library and this provided a much need service to the children of the district until a public library in the town centre opened in 1967. The local Scout group operated a kiosk from the summer house selling icecream and cool drinks on weekends until it was demolished in 1959. For many years Cottesloe children also enjoyed the fancy dress ball held at the centre each year. Perth's annual Motor Show as well as industry fairs were regular events on the western lawns.

As needs have changed so has the building. The building has been altered to cater for the growing needs of the Town of Cottesloe and improvements made to the grounds. In 1962 respected landscape architect John Oldham designed an attractive waterfall garden adjacent to the entry gates off Broome Street. In 1966 the remains of the Spanish Tower were demolished. In 1970 the Governor-General Sir Paul Hasluck unveiled a statue of war time Prime Minister John Curtin who had lived nearby in Jarrad Street. By 2000 the distinctive Italianate walls surrounding the property were crumbling and extensive repairs were carried out in 2004–2006. To celebrate the Council's centenary in 2007 Pennefather's summer house, which overlooked the tennis court on the south side, was recreated and the original tiled floor restored.

The tradition of community events continues. Concerts, Carols by Candlelight, citizenship ceremonies and the annual Pioneers Day lunch are hosted by the Town of Cottesloe. The grounds are open to picnickers and the Civic Centre is a popular venue for weddings.

In 1995 the Cottesloe Civic Centre was included on the Town of Cottesloe Municipal Inventory as a Category 1 or Place of Highly Significant Heritage Value. In 1997 it was made a permanent entry on the State Register of Heritage Places for Western Australia.
