= Ping Que =

(c1837-1886) Chinese-Australian merchant and miner

Ping Que (c1837 – May 1886) was a Chinese-Australian merchant and miner who spent much of his life in the Victorian goldfields and then at the Union Reefs goldfields, just outside of Pine Creek in the Northern Territory. He was a respected member of both the Chinese and European community and employed large numbers of Chinese indentured labourers, many of which he recruited directly while visiting China.

== Early life ==
Que was born in Canton, in an area now known as Guangzhou. Very little is known of his early life.

== Victorian gold rush ==
Que arrived in Australia, first in Victoria, on 23 June 1854, on the ship Cornwall which had sailed via Hong Kong. It is believed that he was then around 17 years old and he soon settled in Creswick which was, at that time, experiencing the Victorian gold rush which had brought with it approximately 20,000 miners many of whom were from China.

Que stayed in this area for many years and was friendly with Lee and Sarah Hang Gong who would later also move to the Northern Territory. Having lived there for 19 years, on 26 November 1873, he applied for naturalisation to become an Australian citizen, the application for which was signed by many leading figures in the community. This application would be granted on 18 December 1873.

== Life in the Northern Territory ==
In the mid-1870s Que decided to move to the Northern Territory and arrived in Darwin on 24 April 1875 via the Claude Hamilton ship, where he travelled, in steerage class from Adelaide. Soon after arrival Que travelled to the Union Reefs goldfield, approximately 15 kilometres (9.3 mi) north of Pine Creek, where other former miners from Creswick had already had success.

Having arrived at the Union Reefs Que employed many indentured labourers from China, who were commonly referred to as 'Coolies' who he paid £1 a day. (Note: This is now recognised as an offensive and derogatory term) Despite being publicly praised by the then mining warden, John George Knight, for his good treatment of the labourers it is also known that Que bought the gold they mined from them at less than the official price set, required them to buy provisions from his own stores and, when they ran out of money, would loan them money at such a high rate of interest that it often meant that they remained indentured to him for a longer period.

Que had a period of great success in 1877, while working five separate claims, including the Lady Alice and the Ping Que Mine, with the assistance of 15 Chinese labourers. At the No. 5, South Union mine these labourers were working in three shifts down shafts 140 feet (43 m) using a horse whim at the top and, in a four-week period (between July and August 1877), they mined 227 ounces (6.4 kg) of gold from just that claim; the depths of their shafts were later extended to 280 feet (85 m). Encouraged by his growing success Que travelled to Singapore himself to engage more labourers and, in the reporting of this was 'complimented; by his long-term friend Adam Jones as the "[w]hitest man on the Union [Reefs]"; this caused some consternation by European miners who did not want more Chinese workers to compete with on the field although again he had the support of Knight in addressing what he viewed as the labour shortage there.

During the later 1870s Que's good fortune continued and in late 1878 he began working The Driffield, 40 kilometres (25 mi) where he worked in partnership with JW Tennant and, between them, they employed over 200 Chinese labourers. On their departure the Northern Territory Times and Gazette reported:

Hundreds of Chinamen could be observed flitting from tent to tent, tying baggage on, securing water bags and massing all things ready for their long journey. The line moved off at 12. First came 20 horses heavily loaded with well filled pack saddles, next came about 100 Chinamen in single file each carrying 140 pounds on their bamboo sticks, following them came the boss, Mr Ping Que and on his left the Superintendent, Mr J W Tennant, both surrounded with four servants, bearing umbrellas and cowtails and close in the rear a fife and drum band consisting of a man and a boy with a picolo and drum. There was a solemnity about the procession, almost funereal.

— Union (from our correspondent), Northern Territory Times and Gazette, 26 October 1878

Despite early promise this was an unprofitable move and Que and Tennant returned to the Union goldfields by March 1879 and, on their return journey all of their remaining supplies were lost in a flash flood. On their return he and Tennant, continuing their partnership, purchased around 600 head of cattle to feed the goldfield and opened a butcher shop to sell it. Between 1879 and 1880 Que visited China twice and little is known of his activities while there but, upon his return he decided to move his operations to Pine Creek. There, alongside his mining activities, he constructed sheep pens and slaughtering yards and, in May 1880 purchased the Pine Creek Hotel (in partnership with Tennant).

In 1882, while visiting the Union Reefs and Pine Creek William Sowden, who was a part of a South Australian Parliamentary delegation to the Northern Territory, noted that: (Note: The claim that Que was ever in New Zealand has been disputed)

The principal store is owned by Ping Que who seems to be a Napoleon amongst his countrymen. He is by far I believe the largest employer of their labour on the Territorean goldfields. Ping Que is a practical miner himself having worked and taken his place with Europeans of all description of mining both in Victoria and New Zealand. He is as superior to the herd with which he is surrounded as it is possible to be and l found him during my visit both intelligent and obliging and fully alive to the importance of having the rich reefs in the neighbourhood examined and reported on in the public press.

— William Sowden, The Northern Territory as it is (1882)

Que's continued business success continued and his standing within the European community can be seen in his involvement as a committee member in the Port Darwin Camp Progress Association and his membership of the mining board.

== Later life and death ==
Over the next few years Que continued to visit China regularly and, in May 1886, news reached Darwin that he had died while in Hong Kong; nothing is known of the circumstances of his death and he was the first Chinese merchant to receive an obituary in the newspapers of the day.

== Legacy ==
The following places in the Northern Territory are named for Que:

- Ping Que Court in Moulden.
- Ping Que Road in Pine Creek.
