= Noongar, Western Australia =

Noongar
- Town
- Interactive map of Noongar
- Coordinates: 31.332691°S 118.970498°E
- Country: Australia
- State: Western Australia
- LGA: Shire of Yilgarn
- Location: 334 km (208 mi) east of Perth; 36 km (22 mi) west of Southern Cross
- Established: 1896

Government
  - State electorate: Central Wheatbelt
  - Federal division: O'Connor
- Elevation: 399 m (1,309 ft)

Population
  - Total: abandoned
- Postcode: 6427

Noongar was a small town halfway between Burracoppin and Southern Cross on the Great Eastern Highway in the Wheatbelt region of Western Australia.

Noongar originated in 1894 as Siding No. 10 on the Yilgarn Railway from Northam to Southern Cross. A stationmaster's house was constructed in 1896, but was burnt to the ground in 1898. The stationmaster was withdrawn in 1907. The area was largely developed for agricultural purposes by 1924, when the need for a townsite became apparent. Lots were surveyed early in 1925 and the townsite was gazetted later the same year.

The name of the town is Aboriginal in origin and means big tree near small waterhole.
