= Acacia formidabilis =

Conservation status
- Priority Three — Poorly Known Taxa (DEC)

Scientific classification
- Kingdom: Plantae
- Clade: Tracheophytes
- Clade: Angiosperms
- Clade: Eudicots
- Clade: Rosids
- Order: Fabales
- Family: Fabaceae
- Subfamily: Caesalpinioideae
- Clade: Mimosoid clade
- Genus: Acacia
- Species: A. formidabilis

Binomial name
- Acacia formidabilis (C.A.Gardner) ex R.S.Cowan & Maslin

Synonyms
- Racosperma formidabile (R.S.Cowan & Maslin) Pedley

Species of legume

Acacia formidabilis is a species of flowering plant in the family Fabaceae and is endemic to the south-west of Western Australia. It is a diffuse, spreading subshrub with softly hairy branchlets, narrowly elliptic or oblong, sharply pointed, leathery phyllodes, spherical heads of pale to deep golden yellow flowers and flat, straight, papery pods.

== Description ==
Acacia formidabilis is a diffuse, spreading, sharply pointed subshrub that typically grows to a height of 25–60 cm (9.8–23.6 in) and has branchlets covered with soft hairs. It has rigid, sharply pointed, narrowly elliptic or oblong phyllodes 13–25 mm (0.51–0.98 in) long, 2.5–4 mm (0.098–0.157 in) wide and leathery, glaucous or pale green with many fine, closely parallel veins. There are curved, spiny stipules 1.5–3 mm (0.059–0.118 in) long at the base of the phyllodes. The flowers are borne in two spherical heads in axils on a peduncle 4–10 mm (0.16–0.39 in) long, each head 4.0–5.5 mm (0.16–0.22 in) in diameter with 31 to 52 pale golden to deep golden yellow flowers. Flowering occurs from August to September, and the pods are flat, straight, up to 12–18 mm (0.47–0.71 in) long and 9–12 mm (0.35–0.47 in) wide, papery, light brown and glabrous. The seeds are egg-shaped, about 2.5 mm (0.098 in) long, dull, mottled brown and lack an aril.

== Taxonomy ==
Acacia formidabilis was first formally described in 1999 by Richard Sumner Cowan and Bruce Maslin in the journal Nuytsia from an unpublished manuscript by Charles Gardner. The type specimen was collected 6 mi (9.7 km) north-west of Southern Cross towards Bullfinch in 1971. The specific epithet (formidabilis) was chosen by Charles Gardner and means 'causing fear' or 'terrible', referring to the spiny stipules and sharply pointed phyllodes.

== Distribution ==
This species of wattle grows on undulating plains and hillsides in sandy soils in scattered locations between Paynes Find and Perenjori and south-east to Southern Cross usually in tall open shrubland.

== Conservation status ==
Acacia formidabilisis listed as "Priority Three" by the Government of Western Australia Department of Parks and Wildlife, meaning that it is poorly known and known from only a few locations but is not under imminent threat.

== See also ==
- List of Acacia species
