= Yellowdine, Western Australia =

Yellowdine
- Town
- Interactive map of Yellowdine
- Coordinates: 31°18′00″S 119°39′00″E
- Country: Australia
- State: Western Australia
- LGA: Shire of Yilgarn
- Location: 402 km (250 mi) east of Perth; 33 km (21 mi) east of Southern Cross
- Established: 1935

Government
  - State electorate: Central Wheatbelt
  - Federal division: O'Connor

Area
  - Total: 1,767 km^{2} (682 sq mi)
- Elevation: 356 m (1,168 ft)

Population
  - Total: 0 (SAL 2021)
- Postcode: 6426

Yellowdine is a town located 402 kilometres (250 mi) east of Perth, Western Australia, on the Great Eastern Highway. The townsite is in the Goldfields–Esperance region, situated in the Shire of Yilgarn.

== History ==
The town was initially planned in 1895 as a railway siding along the Coolgardie to Southern Cross railway line that was opened in 1896. Once gold was discovered at Mount Palmer close to Yellowdine in 1934 the government began to develop the siding as a town-site that was later gazetted in 1935.

The rest house at the railway station was partially destroyed by fire in 1947.

The Yellowdine Roadhouse was destroyed by fire on 24 December 2023 from a suspected arson attack.

The name of the town is believed to be Aboriginal in origin, a misspelling of Yelladine, although its meaning is unknown.
