= Mount Jackson (Western Australia) =

Hill in Western Australia

Mount Jackson is a hill in outback Western Australia located at 30.249°S 119.264°E. It is situated 67 kilometres (42 mi) NNW of Koolyanobbing and 110 kilometres (68 mi) NNE of Southern Cross. It is in the Shire of Yilgarn.

Augustus Gregory discovered and named the 617-metre (2,024 ft) high landmark on 17 August 1846 during his first expedition east and north of the Swan River. Prospectors James Speakman and William Hall discovered gold there in January 1894.

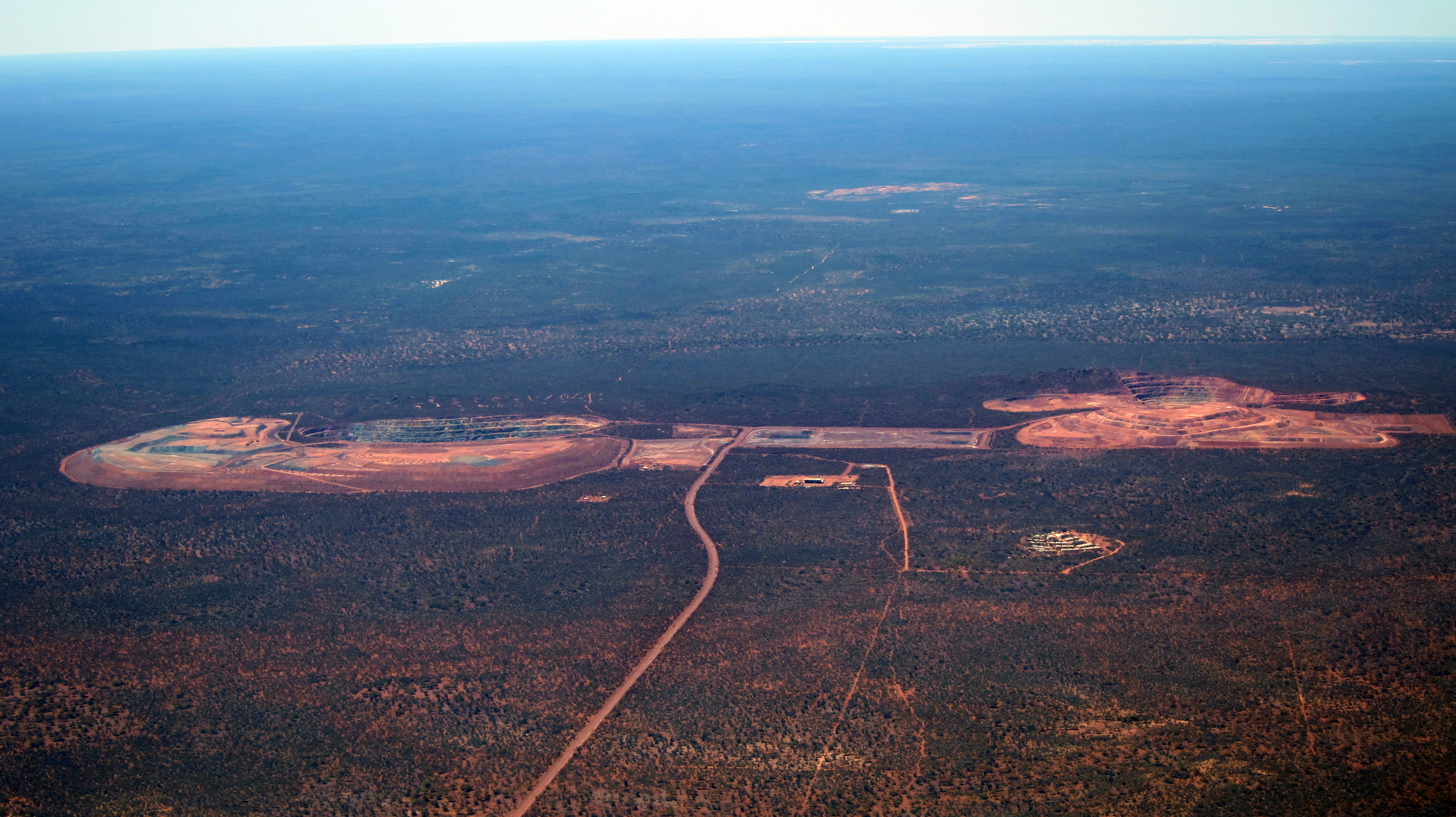
Iron ore mining at Mount Jackson

As of 2008, the 605-hectare (1,490-acre) site was being mined for iron ore by Cliffs Asia Pacific Iron Ore Pty Ltd, a subsidiary of Cliffs Natural Resources of Cleveland, Ohio. Ore is trucked to Koolyanobbing via a haul road and then by rail to port at Esperance for export. The mine has an expected life of 10 years and the operators expect to remove approximately 33 million tonnes of iron ore from two pits.

The mine is part of Cliff's Koolyanobbing Iron Ore Project which includes mines at Mount Jackson, Koolyanobbing and Windarling (25 kilometres (16 mi) further north). It was established for ironstone mining from about 2003 by Portman Limited. Portman was acquired by Cliffs Natural Resources Limited in January 2009.
