= List of heritage places in the Shire of Boddington =

The State Register of Heritage Places is maintained by the Heritage Council of Western Australia. As of 2026, 62 places are heritage-listed in the Shire of Boddington, of which just one is listed on the State Register of Heritage Places, Asquith Bridge, which was completely destroyed in a bush fire in 2015.

== List ==
The Western Australian State Register of Heritage Places, as of 2026, lists the following heritage registered places within the Shire of Boddington:

=== State Register of Heritage Places ===
State Register of Heritage Places in the Shire of Boddington:

| Place name | Place # | Location | Suburb | Co-ordinates | Built | State registered | Notes | Photo |
|---|---|---|---|---|---|---|---|---|
| Asquith Bridge | 15424 | Long Gully Road | Upper Murray | 33°00′37″S 116°16′26″E | 1949 | 8 December 2006 | Also referred to as Banksiadale Sawmill tramway, Timber Company, Tramway Bridge, MRWA 4559, Long Gully Bridge; A 28 span, 127.88 metres long, curved timber trestle construction railway bridge across the Murray River; Completely destroyed in a bush fire in February 2015, not rebuild | |

=== Shire of Boddington heritage-listed places ===
The following places are heritage listed in the Shire of Boddington but are not State registered:

| Place name | Place # | Street # | Street name | Suburb or town | Notes & former names | Photo |
|---|---|---|---|---|---|---|
| Boddington Hotel | 166 | | Bannister Road | Boddington | | |
| Marradong Road Board Office (former) | 167 | | Johnstone Street | Boddington | Senior Citizens Centre, Old Road Board Office | |
| Red Hill Homestead | 168 | | Williams Road | Marradong | | |
| Mud Brick Homestead | 169 | 6743 | Pinjarra-Williams Road | Marradong | Springfield, Tom Pollards's Homestead (former) | |
| Marradong Hall - Site of | 170 | | Pinjarra-Williams Road | Marradong | | |
| St Albans Church & Marradong Graveyard | 171 | | Pinjarra-Williams Road | Boddington | Marradong Church and, Marradong Cemetery | |
| Boddington Old School | 3122 | Corner | Wuraming Avenue & Bannister Road | Boddington | Boddington District School, Boddington Junior School | |
| Road Bridge over Crossman River | 3398 | | Albany Hwy over Collie River | Crossman | Bridge No 0019 | |
| Boddington Town Hall | 3952 | | Johnstone Street Corner Wuraming Avenue | Boddington | Marradong Community Hall | |
| Bushy Park Homestead | 4052 | | | Boddington | Captain Fawcett's Bushy Park Homestead | |
| Dilyan's Grave | 8474 | | Bannister-Marradong Road | Boddington | | |
| Mokine | 8475 | | Williams Road | Marradong | Mokine Homestead | |
| Boddington Police Station (former) | 8476 | | Wuraming Avenue | Boddington | Playgroup Centre | |
| Farmers' Crossing | 8477 | | "Clover Glen", Farmer's Avenue | Mokine/Boddington | Brockman's Crossing, Brockman, Farmers' Railway Siding and Goods Shed | |
| Camballing Road Bridge - old and current bridges | 15406 | | Pinjarra-Williams Road | Hotham River | MRWA 407 current bridge | |
| Boddington War Memorial (all wars) | 15631 | | Bannister Street, Boddington Memorial Park | Boddington | | |
| Rowell's House site & Shearing Shed | 16221 | | Marradong-Quindanning Road | Quindanning | | |
| Boddington Police Station | 17410 | | Johnstone Street | Boddington | | |
| Jarrah Tree | 17633 | | Mort's Road | Boddington | | |
| Tomato Tony's Cottage - Ranford | 17634 | lot 42 | Cowcher Road | Ranford | | |
| Railway Line Precinct - Boddington to Dwellingup | 17635 | | | Boddington to Dwellingup | | |
| First meeting of the Road Board (site) | 17636 | | East of Pinjarra-Williams Road | Marradong | | |
| Banksiadale Bush Camp | 17637 | | 1 km south of the Harvey Quindanning Road | Banksiadale | Mrs Le Merciers Farm (former), Tulmo Pine Planta, Banksiadale Single Men's Camp (former) | |
| Jack Hare's Grave | 17638 | | 1 km south of Boddingtom | Boddington | | |
| Stagbouer's Timber Mill (former) | 17639 | | off Hill Street | Boddington | Millar's Mill (site) | |
| Gordon's Peg Factory (former) | 17640 | | Hotham Avenue | Boddington | | |
| A. H. Gordon & Sons Timber Mill (site) | 17644 | | off Hotham Avenue | Boddington | Coops' Mill | |
| Industrial Extracts Office & Factory (site) | 17645 | 3 | Tannin Place | Ranford | Tannin Factory | |
| Mooliaman's Reserve | 17646 | | Crossman Road | Boddington | | |
| Mooliman's Tank | 17647 | | Crossman Road | Boddington | | |
| Farmers River Crossing (former) | 17648 | | Palmer Road | Boddington | footbridge | |
| Shepherd's Hut (site) | 17649 | | | Boddington | | |
| Hillside Homestead (former) | 17650 | | | Boddington | | |
| Hotham River Homestead | 17651 | | Cloverglen', Farmers Avenue | Boddington | | |
| George Farmer's House | 17652 | | | Boddington | | |
| Hope Cottage (Boddington) | 17653 | | Farmers Avenue | Boddington | | |
| Wayside Cottage (site) | 17654 | | | Boddington | | |
| Trentholme | 17655 | | Farmers Avenue | Boddington | Teacher's House (former for Hotham River School) | |
| Hotham River School (site) | 17656 | | Palmers Road | Boddington | | |
| Marradong School (site) | 17657 | | Pinjarra-Williams Road | Marradong | | |
| Boddington District Hospital | 17658 | 53 | Hotham Avenue | Boddington | Cottage Hospital, Nurses' Quarters | |
| RSL Hall | 17659 | 58 | Hotham Avenue | Boddington | | |
| George Charlton's House (former) | 17660 | 19 | Bannister Road | Boddington | | |
| Shop Precinct | 17661 | | Bannister Road | Boddington | | |
| St James' Church of England Church Hall | 17662 | | Hill Street Hotham Avenue | Boddington | Ranford Boarding House (former) | |
| Infant Health Clinic (former) | 17663 | 31 | Bannister Road | Boddington | Medical Centre | |
| Hall's Cottage | 17664 | | 27 Johnstone Street | Boddington | | |
| Laura Hotel (former) | 17665 | | Pinjarra-Williams Road | Marradong | Marradong hotel | |
| Tullis Mill (site) | 17666 | | situated 2.4 km west of Tullis Siding | Boddington | | |
| Tullis Bridge | 17667 | | across the Hotham River | Boddington | | |
| Hotham River Homestead Group | 17811 | | around Farmers Avenue | Boddington | | |
| Boddington Public Buildings Group | 17812 | | Johnstone Streetreet | Marradong | | |
| Mount Wells Fire Tower | 18454 | | | Boddington | | |
| Lion's Weir | 23676 | | Wuraming Avenue | Boddington | | |
| Boddington Rodeo Grounds | 23884 | | Hakea Road | Boddington | | |
| Camballing Marradong School (site) | 23911 | Lot 11899 | Pinjarra-Williams Road | Marradong | | |
| Monday's Store site | 23924 | | Pinjarra-Williams Road | Marradong | | |
| House, 39 Hotham Avenue, Boddington | 25382 | 39 | Hotham Avenueenue | Boddington | | |
| Bridge 3084, Crossman Road, Boddington | 26118 | | Crossman Road | Boddington | | |
| Peppercorn Tree | 26815 | | Bannister Road | Boddington | | |
