= Lower Hotham, Western Australia =

Locality in the Shire of Boddington, Western Australia

Lower Hotham
- Town
- Coordinates: 32.92°S 116.38°E
- Country: Australia
- State: Western Australia
- LGA(s): Shire of Boddington
- Location: 148 km (92 mi) from Perth; 24 km (15 mi) from Boddington

Government
  - State electorate(s): Central Wheatbelt
  - Federal division(s): O'Connor

Area
  - Total: 118.5 km^{2} (45.8 sq mi)

Population
  - Total(s): 13 (SAL 2021)
- Postcode: 6390
Localities around Lower Hotham
Wuraming	Marradong	Marradong
Wuraming	Lower Hotham	Marradong
Upper Murray	Yourdamunga Lake	Quindanning

Lower Hotham is a rural locality located in the Shire of Boddington in the Peel Region of Western Australia. The Hotham River flows though the locality, joining the Williams River in the southern parts of Lower Hotham.

Lower Hotham is located on the traditional land of the Wiilman people of the Noongar nation.
