= Congelin, Western Australia =

Congelin
- Town
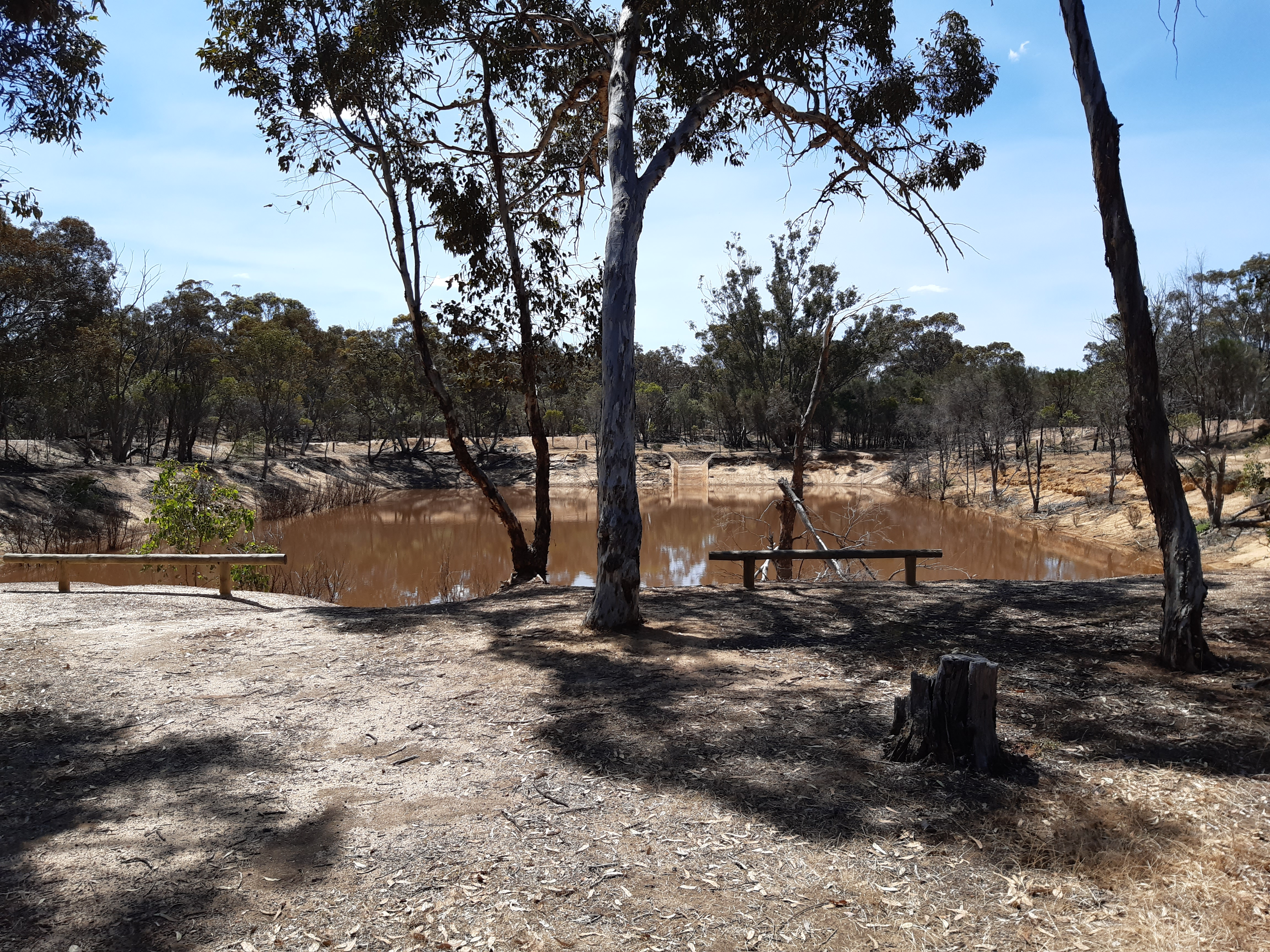
- Congelin Railway Dam, part of the former Pinjarra to Narrogin railway at Congelin Railway Siding

- Interactive map of Congelin
- Coordinates: 32.85°S 116.89°E
- Country: Australia
- State: Western Australia
- LGA: Shire of Williams
- Location: 179 km (111 mi) SE of Perth; 25 km (16 mi) N of Williams
- Established: 1913

Government
  - State electorate: Roe
  - Federal division: O'Connor
- Elevation: 278 m (912 ft)
- Postcode: 6391

Congelin is a locality in the Wheatbelt region of Western Australia, north of Williams. It is located within the Shire of Williams.

== History ==
The townsite was requested by the 14 Mile Brook Progress Association in 1911. The name, derived from a nearby pool, is of Aboriginal origin but its meaning is unknown. Gazetted in 1913, the town did not develop and to this day remains a sparsely populated agricultural area on the edge of the Darling Scarp. Plans by the Shire of Williams to seal its part of the Congelin-Narrogin road are in progress.
