= Mount Wells, Western Australia =

Mount Wells
- Town
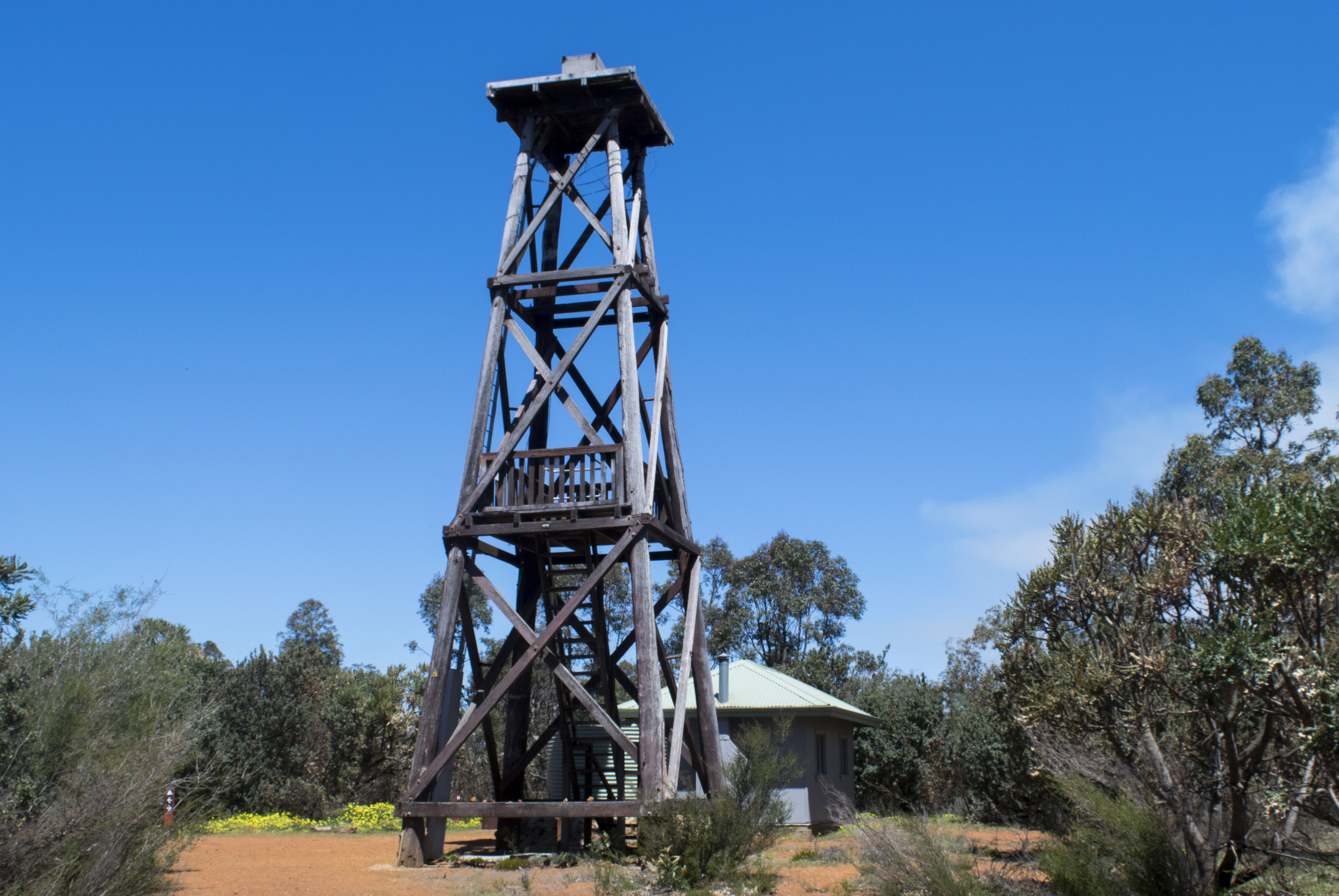
- The Fire tower, with the hut visible in the background
- Interactive map of Mount Wells
- Coordinates: 32°41′54″S 116°20′09″E
- Country: Australia
- State: Western Australia
- LGA: Shire of Boddington
- Location: 120 km (75 mi) from Perth
- Established: 1920s

Government
  - State electorate: Central Wheatbelt
  - Federal division: O'Connor

Area
  - Total: 236 km^{2} (91 sq mi)

Population
  - Total: 0 (SAL 2016)
- Postcode: 6390
Localities around Mount Wells
Solus	Mount Cooke	North Bannister
Banksiadale	Mount Wells	Bannister
Banksiadale	Wuraming	Bannister

Mount Wells is a locality and land feature located in bushland near Boddington, south-east of Perth. It is located on the Bibbulmun Track and is also known as Wourahming Hill.

== History ==
Mount Wells's history since colonisation, as the highest point in the area, was as a fire lookout for the surrounding timber milling region. The original fire tower and huts were ironically destroyed by fire in 1961, but rebuilt in 1962. It was renovated by the Department of Conservation and Land Management (CALM) and a Karnet Prison crew in 1997 for overnight use by walkers on the 'new' Bibbulmun Track, Western Australia's award-winning walk trail, stretching 1,003.1 kilometres (623.3 mi) from the Perth Hills to Albany.

== Present day ==
A sleeping shelter for 8–10 people has been constructed from an old firetower-keeper's hut, complete with old wood stove, for overnight use by walkers on the Bibbulmun Track. The nearby tower is still occasionally used as a fire lookout and offers views of the Darling Scarp as well as nearby gold mining operations. A 14-kilometre (8.7 mi) return walk to Boonering Hill, a giant granite mount rising above the jarrah forest north of Mount Wells, is popular among bushwalkers, with verticordia flowers covering its fringes in spring.

== Boddington Gold Mine ==
The nearby Boddington Gold Mine, south-east of the locality and presently owned by Newmont Mining (67%) and AngloGold (33%), commenced operations in 1987. It ceased mining operations on 30 November 2001, but reopened on 3 February 2010.
