= Wuraming, Western Australia =

Locality in the Shire of Boddington, Western Australia

Wuraming
- Town
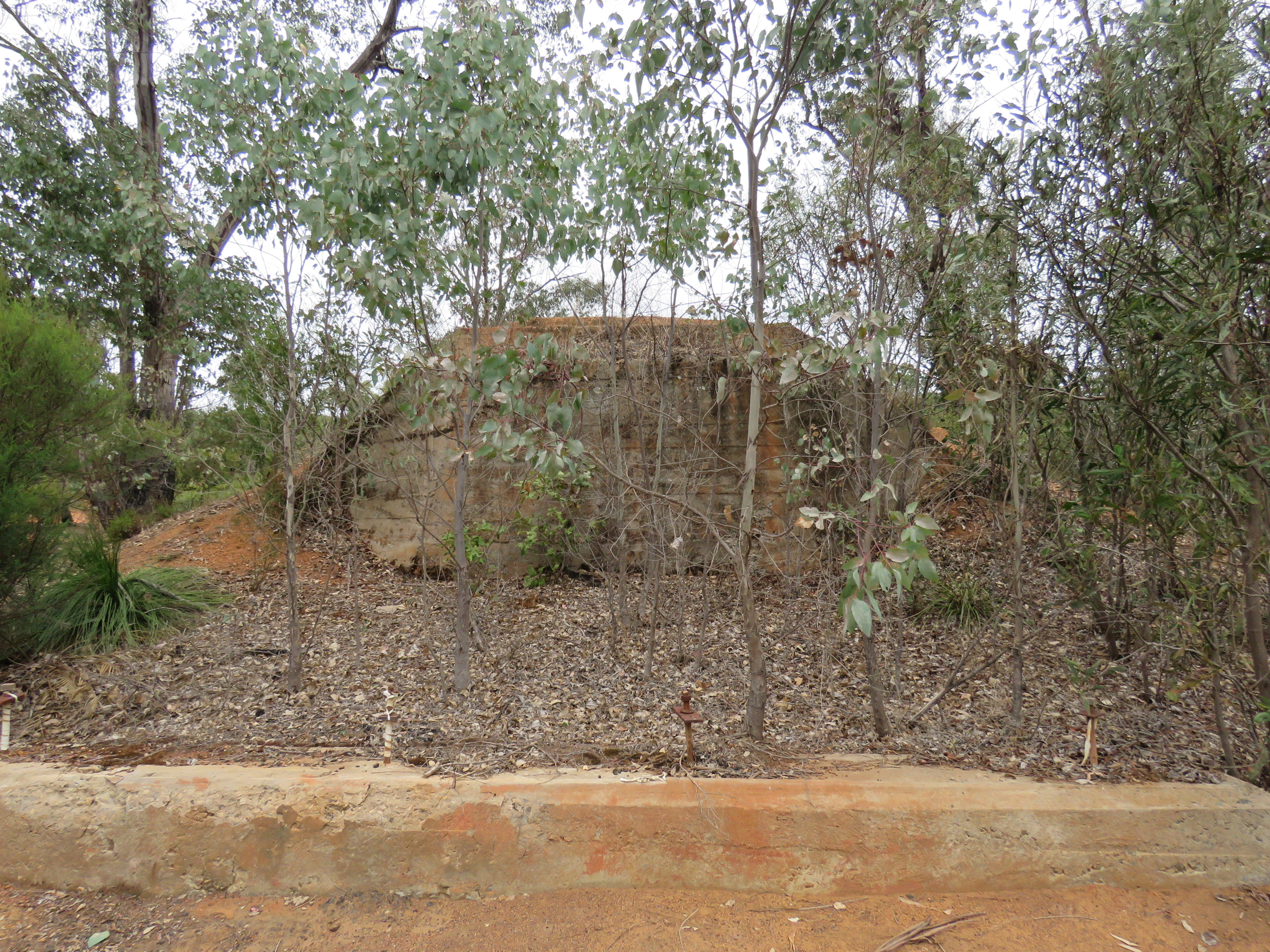
- Foundations of the former Long Gully Bridge
- Coordinates: 32.84°S 116.25°E
- Country: Australia
- State: Western Australia
- LGA(s): Shire of Boddington
- Location: 131 km (81 mi) from Perth; 26 km (16 mi) from Boddington

Government
  - State electorate(s): Central Wheatbelt
  - Federal division(s): O'Connor

Area
  - Total: 349.5 km^{2} (134.9 sq mi)

Population
  - Total(s): 0 (SAL 2016)
- Postcode: 6390
Localities around Wuraming
Inglehope	Mount Wells	Bannister
Nanga Brook	Wuraming	Marradong
Hoffman	Upper Murray	Lower Hotham

Wuraming is a rural locality located in the Shire of Boddington in the Peel Region of Western Australia. The locality is almost completely forested except for a section in the north-east where parts of the Boddington Gold Mine operation are located.

Wuraming is on the traditional land of the Wiilman people of the Noongar nation.

Wuraming was a siding on the Dwellingup to Boddington section of the Pinjarra to Narrogin railway until the line closed in 1968, with the line running north of the current Pinjarra-Williams Road.
