= Ranford, Western Australia =

Town in Australia

Ranford
- Town
- Coordinates: 201)_dim:2000&title=Ranford 32°48′S 116°30′E
- Country: Australia
- State: Western Australia
- LGA(s): Shire of Boddington
- Location: 127 km (79 mi) from Perth
- Established: 1936

Government
  - State electorate(s): Central Wheatbelt
  - Federal division(s): O'Connor

Area
  - Total: 2 km^{2} (0.77 sq mi)

Population
  - Total(s): 201 (SAL 2021)
- Postcode: 6390
Localities around Ranford
Boddington	Bannister	Boddington
Boddington	Ranford	Boddington
Boddington	Boddington	Boddington

Ranford is a town located 3 kilometres (2 mi) north-east of Boddington along the road from Pinjarra to Williams.

== History ==
The town's name honours Henry Samuel Ranford, who had traversed the Hotham River and marked out the first holdings in the vicinity. In 1884, he became a government surveyor with the Lands Department and held various appointments in the Swan River Colony, including Acting Surveyor General. In 1897, he moved to Katanning to become the Government Land Agent.

Ranford was a stop on the Pinjarra to Narrogin railway line.

In 1936, Industrial Extracts Ltd, which produced tanning extracts from white gum timber, proposed a townsite at the location of their Tannin Extracts Factory. The townsite was gazetted and named Ranford in 1936. The Lieutenant Governor, Sir James Mitchell, opened the factory on 21 April 1937. For the next 20 years, the factory operated and brought many people to the district in the post-Depression era. However, by 1957, the plant had been closed down—twenty years at three shifts a day had worn out the factory and nearly exhausted the timber supply. Both mills were removed, and the offices, which are now private dwellings for donkeys, are the only original buildings remaining.

Although Ranford had a boarding house it relied on Boddington for its services, including shopping and education.

== Present day ==
Ranford is largely a historic site, with a few remaining cottages and the factory area, now used as a grain storage silo. A large pool at the end of River Road offers canoeing and other water activities.
