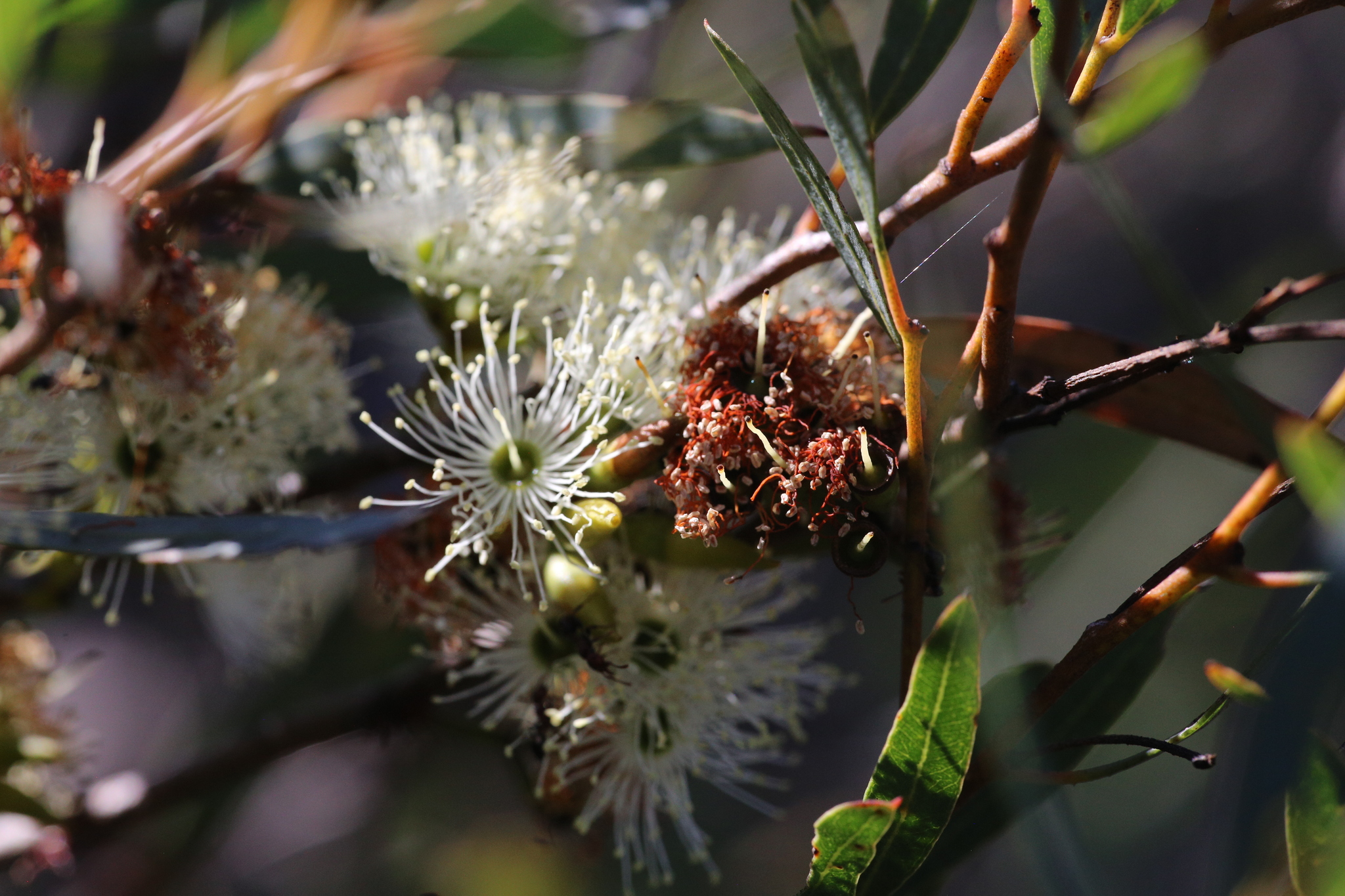

Conservation status
- Vulnerable (IUCN 3.1)

Scientific classification
- Kingdom: Plantae
- Clade: Tracheophytes
- Clade: Angiosperms
- Clade: Eudicots
- Clade: Rosids
- Order: Myrtales
- Family: Myrtaceae
- Genus: Eucalyptus
- Species: E. xanthonema

Binomial name
- Eucalyptus xanthonema Turcz.

Synonyms
- Eucalyptus redunca var. angustifolia Benth.

= Eucalyptus xanthonema =

Yellow-flowered mallee

Species of eucalyptus

Eucalyptus xanthonema, commonly known as yellow-flowered mallee, is a species of mallee that is endemic to the south west of Western Australia. It has smooth bark, linear adult leaves, flower buds in groups of up to eleven, white to pale lemon-coloured flowers and barrel-shaped fruit.

== Description ==
Eucalyptus xanthonema is a mallee that typically grows to a height of 1–5 m (3 ft 3 in – 16 ft 5 in) and forms a lignotuber. It has smooth grey and brownish bark that is shed in ribbons that sometimes accumulate near the base. Young plants and coppice regrowth have soft, thin, bluish green, linear to lance-shaped leaves that are 60–80 mm (2.4–3.1 in) long and 7–10 mm (0.28–0.39 in) wide. Adult leaves are the same shade of green on both sides, linear, 35–77 mm (1.4–3.0 in) long and 3–11 mm (0.12–0.43 in) wide, tapering to a petiole 3–17 mm (0.12–0.67 in) long. The flower buds are arranged in leaf axils in groups of seven to eleven on an unbranched peduncle 5–10 mm (0.20–0.39 in) long, the individual buds on pedicels 2–4 mm (0.079–0.157 in) long. Mature buds are spindle-shaped, 9–16 mm (0.35–0.63 in) long and 3–4 mm (0.12–0.16 in) wide with a conical operculum that is up to twice as long as the floral cup. Flowering occurs from September to December or from January to February and the flowers are white to pale lemon yellow. The fruit is a woody, barrel-shaped capsule 5–8 mm (0.20–0.31 in) long and 4–5 mm (0.16–0.20 in) wide with the valves near rim level.

== Taxonomy and naming ==
Eucalyptus xanthonema was first formally described in 1847 by Nikolai Turczaninow in the journal Bulletin de la Société Impériale des Naturalistes de Moscou. The specific epithet (xanthonema) is derived from ancient Greek words meaning "yellow" and "thread", referring to the colour of the dried flowers.

In 1991, Ian Brooker and Stephen Hopper described two subspecies and the names are accepted by the Australian Plant Census:

- Eucalyptus xanthonema subsp. apposita Brooker & Hopper has broader leaves (up to 15 mm (0.59 in) wide) that the autonym;
- Eucalyptus xanthonema Turcz. subsp. xanthonema has leaves that are 10 mm (0.39 in) wide or less.

== Distribution and habitat ==
The yellow-flowered mallee grows in low mallee shrubland on plains and gentle slopes between Williams, the Stirling Range and the Fitzgerald River National Park. Subspecies apposita is restricted to the Stirling Range.

== Conservation status ==
Both subspecies of E. xanthonema are classified as "not threatened" by the Western Australian Government Department of Parks and Wildlife.

== See also ==
- List of Eucalyptus species
