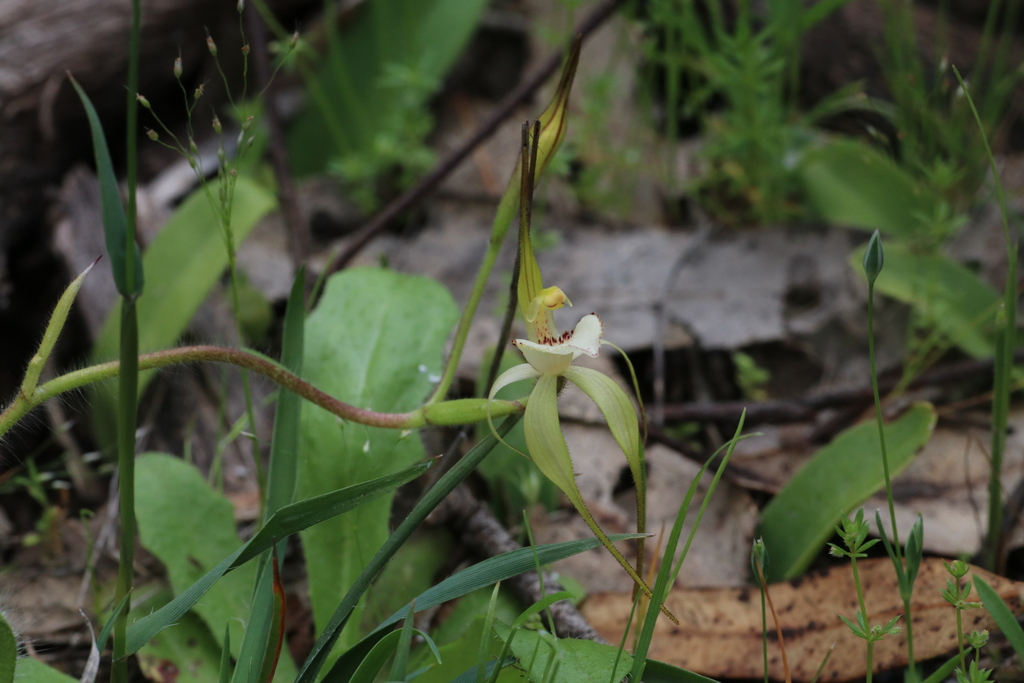

Conservation status
- Declared rare (DEC)

Scientific classification
- Kingdom: Plantae
- Clade: Embryophytes
- Clade: Tracheophytes
- Clade: Spermatophytes
- Clade: Angiosperms
- Clade: Monocots
- Order: Asparagales
- Family: Orchidaceae
- Subfamily: Orchidoideae
- Tribe: Diurideae
- Genus: Caladenia
- Species: C. hopperiana

Binomial name
- Caladenia hopperiana A.P.Br. & G.Brockman

= Caladenia hopperiana =

Species of orchid

Caladenia hopperiana is a species of orchid endemic to the south-west of Western Australia. It has a single leaf and up to four creamy-yellow flowers with faint red markings.

== Description ==
Caladenia hopperiana is a terrestrial, perennial, deciduous, herb with an underground tuber and which sometimes grows in clumps. It has a single, erect, pale green leaf, 80–160 mm (3–6 in) long and 7–11 mm (0.3–0.4 in) wide with reddish-purple blotches near its base. Up to four creamy-yellow flowers with faint red markings 40–50 mm (1.6–2.0 in) in diameter are borne on a stalk 140–180 mm (6–7 in) tall. The sepals and petals are linear to lance-shaped for about half their length then suddenly narrow to thread-like, densely glandular ends. The dorsal sepal is erect but curves forward, 25–40 mm (0.98–1.6 in) long and 1–2 mm (0.04–0.08 in) wide. The lateral sepals are 30–45 mm (1–2 in) long and 3–4 mm (0.1–0.2 in) wide and spread horizontally near their bases but then drooping and sometimes crossing each other. The petals are 25–30 mm (0.98–1.2 in) long and about 3 mm (0.1 in) wide and hanging like the lateral sepals. The labellum is 12–17 mm (0.5–0.7 in) long and 8–10 mm (0.3–0.4 in) wide and white with the tip rolled under. The sides of the labellum have short, blunt, forward-facing, white to deep brown teeth, decreasing in size towards the front of the labellum. There are four or six rows of glossy red hockey stick-shaped calli up to 1 mm (0.04 in) long along the centre line of the labellum for about half its length. Flowering occurs from September to October.

== Taxonomy and naming ==
Caladenia hopperiana was first described in 2001 by Andrew Brown and Garry Brockman from a specimen collected near Quindanning and the description was published in Nuytsia. The specific epithet (hopperiana) honours the Western Australian botanist, Stephen Hopper.

== Distribution and habitat ==
This caladenia is only known from the Qunidanning district in the Jarrah Forest biogeographic region where it grows in woodland near creeks and swamps.

== Conservation ==
Caladenia hopperiana is classified as "Threatened Flora (Declared Rare Flora — Extant)" by the Western Australian Government Department of Parks and Wildlife.
