= Conostylis caricina =

Scientific classification
- Kingdom: Plantae
- Clade: Tracheophytes
- Clade: Angiosperms
- Clade: Monocots
- Clade: Commelinids
- Order: Commelinales
- Family: Haemodoraceae
- Genus: Conostylis
- Species: C. caricina

Binomial name
- Conostylis caricina Lindl.
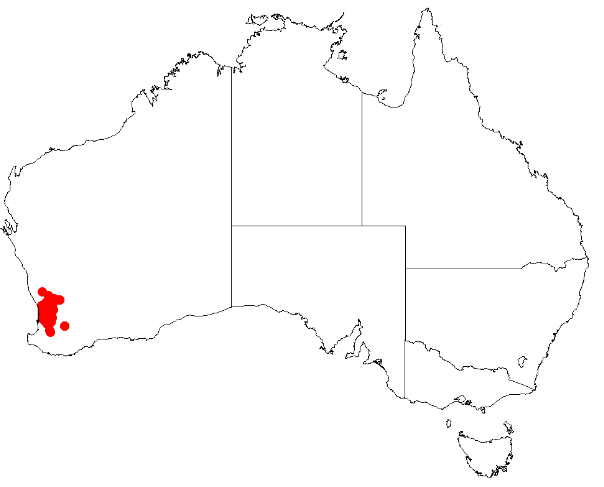
- Occurrence data from AVH

Species of flowering plant

Conostylis caricina is a flowering plant in the family Haemodoraceae and is endemic to the south-west of Western Australia. It is a rhizomatous, tufted perennial, grass-like plant or herb with flat leaves and heads of 6 to 8 creamy-yellow flowers.

== Description ==
Conostylis caricina is a rhizomatous, tufted, grass-like plant or herb that typically grows to 5–20 cm (2.0–7.9 in) high and has short stems. The leaves are flat, 50–300 mm (2.0–11.8 in) long with fibrous margins. The flower stem is 320–500 mm (13–20 in) long, each flower on a pedicel 1.0–1.5 mm (0.039–0.059 in) long. The flowers are 20–120 mm (0.79–4.72 in) long with a head of 6 to 8 flowers with a single, brown, membrane-like bract 5–30 mm (0.20–1.18 in) long. The perianth is creamy yellow, 4–15 mm (0.16–0.59 in) long with wooly hairs on the outside, with claw-like lobes 3–9 mm (0.12–0.35 in) long. The anthers are 3–6 mm (0.12–0.24 in) long and the style 4–10 mm (0.16–0.39 in) long. Flowering occurs from July to September.

== Taxonomy and naming ==
Conostylis caricina was first formally described in 1840 by John Lindley and the description was published in A Sketch of the Vegetation of the Swan River Colony. The specific epithet (caricina) means "rush-like".

In 1987, Stephen Hopper described two subspecies of C. caricina in Flora of Australia, and the names are accepted by the Australian Plant Census:

- Conostylis caricina Lindl. subsp. caricina has leaves 100–300 mm (3.9–11.8 in) long, the perianth 10–15 mm (0.39–0.59 in) long.
- Conostylis caricina subsp. elachys Hopper has leaves 50–100 mm (2.0–3.9 in) long, the perianth 4–8 mm (0.16–0.31 in) long.

== Distribution and habitat ==
This conostylis occurs in the area between Gunyidi, Marradong and Dowerin in the Darling Range in the Avon Wheatbelt, Jarrah Forest and Swan Coastal Plain bioregions of south-western Western Australia. Subspecies elachys is found further east between Gunyidi, Calingiri and Goomalling in the Avon Wheatbelt and Jarrah Forest bioregions.

== Conservation status ==
Conostylis caricina is listed as "not threatened" by the Western Australian Government Department of Biodiversity, Conservation and Attractions, but subspecies elachys is classified as "Priority One", meaning that it is known from only one or a few locations that are potentially at risk.
