= Mount Wells =

Mount Wells may refer to:

- Mount Wells (Antarctica)
- Mount Wells, Western Australia
