= List of acts of the Parliament of Western Australia from 1912 =

This is a list of acts of the Parliament of Western Australia for the year 1912.

== 1912 ==
Short title, or popular name	Citation	Royal assent
Long title
Early Closing Act Amendment Act 1911	No. 1 of 1912	8 January 1912
An Act to further amend the Early Closing Act, 1902. (Note: Early Closing Act 1902 (1 & 2 Edw. VII. No. 24))
Marrinup Branch Railway Act 1911	No. 2 of 1912	8 January 1912
An Act to declare the Marrinup Branch Railway lawfully open for traffic.
Trans-Continental Railway Act 1911	No. 6 of 1912	9 January 1912
An Act to consent to the construction by the Commonwealth of Australia of the Western Australian portion of a Railway from Kalgoorlie to Port Augusta; and to enable the Governor to grant to the Commonwealth such waste lands of the Crown in Western Australia as are required for the construction, maintenance, and working of such Railway.
Upper Darling Range Railway Extension Act 1911	No. 13 of 1912	9 January 1912
An Act to authorise an Extension of the Upper Darling Range Railway.
Hotham–Crossman Railway Act 1911	No. 14 of 1912	9 January 1912
An Act to authorise the Construction of a Railway from Hotham to Crossman.
Yillimining–Kodinin Railway Act 1911	No. 15 of 1912	9 January 1912
AN ACT to authorise the Construction of a Railway from Yillimining to Kondinin.
North Fremantle Municipal Tramways Act Amendment Act 1912	No. 23 of 1912	19 August 1912
An Act to amend the North Fremantle Municipal Tramways Act, 1907. (Note: North Fremantle Municipal Tramways Act 1907 (No. 25))
	No. 24 of 1912	19 August 1912
An Act to amend the Nedlands Park Tramways Act, 1907. (Note: Nedlands Park Tramways Act 1907 (No. 30))
Tramways Purchase Act 1912	No. 31 of 1912	27 September 1912
An Act for the Purchase by the Government of Western Australia of the Undertaking of the Perth Electric Tramways, Limited, and for other purposes.
Fremantle–Kalgoorlie (Merredin–Coolgardie Section) Railway Act 1912	No. 35 of 1912	10 October 1912
An Act to authorise the Construction of an additional line of Railway from Merredin to Coolgardie, on the Fremantle–Kalgoorlie Railway.
High School Act Amendment Act 1912	No. 44 of 1912	24 December 1912
An Act to amend the High School Act, 1876. (Note: High School Act 1876 (40 Vict. No. 8))
Victoria Park Tramways Act Amendment Act 1912	No. 52 of 1912	30 December 1912
An Act to amend the Victoria Park Tramways Act, 1904. (Note: Victoria Park Tramways Act 1904 (No. 50))
Government Tramways Act 1912	No. 58 of 1912	30 December 1912
An Act for the Construction, Maintenance, and Working of Government Tramways.
Wagin–Bowelling Railway Act 1912	No. 73 of 1912	24 December 1912
An Act to authorise the Construction of a Railway from Wagin to Rowelling.
Newcastle–Bolgart Railway Extension Act 1912	No. 74 of 1912	24 December 1912
An Act to authorise an Extension of the Newcastle–Bolgart Railway.
	No. X of 1912	
Hotham–Crossman Railway Extension Act 1912	No. 76 of 1912	24 December 1912
An Act to authorise an Extension of the Hotham–Crossinan Railway.
Wyalcatchem–Mount Marshall Railway Act 1912	No. 77 of 1912	24 December 1912
An Act to authorise the Construction of a Railway from Wyalcatchem to Mount Marshall.
Game Act 1912	No. 78 of 1912	24 December 1912
An Act to consolidate and amend the Laws relating to Imported and Native Game.

== Sources ==
- "legislation.wa.gov.au".
