= Upper Murray =

Upper Murray may refer to:

- Shire of Upper Murray
  - Upper Murray Football Netball League
- Murray Upper, Queensland
- Upper Murray, Western Australia
