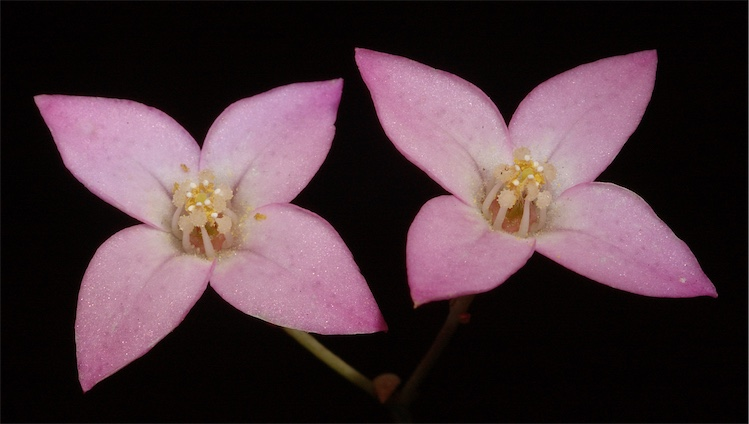

Scientific classification
- Kingdom: Plantae
- Clade: Tracheophytes
- Clade: Angiosperms
- Clade: Eudicots
- Clade: Rosids
- Order: Sapindales
- Family: Rutaceae
- Genus: Boronia
- Species: B. ovata

Binomial name
- Boronia ovata Lindl.
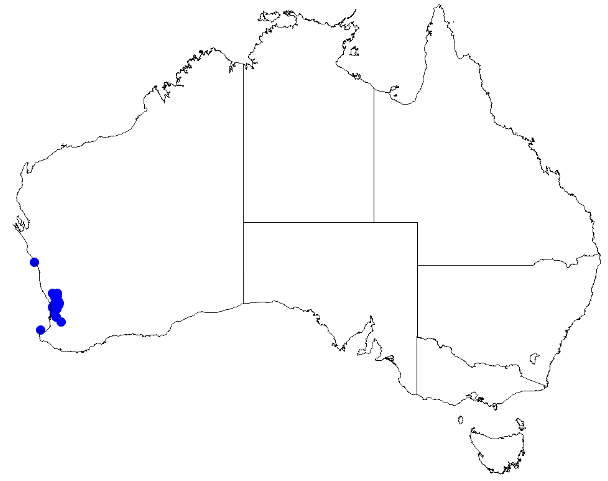
- Occurrence data from Australasian Virtual Herbarium

= Boronia ovata =

Species of flowering plant

Boronia ovata is a plant in the citrus family, Rutaceae and is endemic to the south-west of Western Australia. It is an open shrub with simple, egg-shaped leaves and pink to mauve four-petalled flowers. It is found in the Darling Range near Perth.

== Description ==
Boronia ovata is an open shrub that grows to a height of about 40 cm (16 in) and has broadly egg-shaped leaves that about 10 mm (0.39 in) long. The flowers are arranged in small groups on the ends of the branches, each flower on the end of a thin pedicel 5–15 mm (0.20–0.59 in) long. The four sepals are red, broadly egg-shaped with a pointed tip and about 2.5 mm (0.1 in) long. The four petals are pink to mauve, elliptic and about 8 mm (0.3 in) long. The eight stamens are glabrous with an anther about 1 mm (0.04 in) long with a small white tip. The stigma is minute. Flowering occurs from September to November.

== Taxonomy and naming ==
Boronia ovata was first formally described in 1841 by John Lindley and the description was published in Edwards's Botanical Register. The specific epithet (ovata) is a Latin word meaning "egg-shaped".

== Distribution and habitat ==
This boronia grows in eucalypt woodland in the Darling Range between New Norica and Boddington in the Avon Wheatbelt, Jarrah Forest and Swan Coastal Plain biogeographic regions.

== Conservation ==
Boronia ovata is classified as "not threatened" by the Western Australian Government Department of Parks and Wildlife.
