= North Bannister, Western Australia =

North Bannister
- Town
- Interactive map of North Bannister
- Coordinates: 32.538°S 116.478°E
- Country: Australia
- State: Western Australia
- LGA: Shire of Wandering
- Location: 94 km (58 mi) SSE of Perth; 24 km (15 mi) N of Boddington; 39 km (24 mi) ENE of Dwellingup

Government
  - State electorate: Wagin
  - Federal division: O'Connor

Area
  - Total: 142.5 km^{2} (55.0 sq mi)
- Elevation: 337 m (1,106 ft)

Population
  - Total: 0 (SAL 2016)
- Postcode: 6390

North Bannister is a locality in the Wheatbelt region of Western Australia, 94 kilometres (58 mi) south-southeast of the state capital, Perth along Albany Highway between Armadale and Williams.

The locality's name honours Thomas Bannister who discovered the nearby Bannister River, a tributary of the Hotham River, in 1830 while leading the first overland expedition from Perth to King George Sound (now Albany). The name was applied to the river in 1832 by surveyor-general John Septimus Roe.
