= Bannister, Western Australia =

Locality in the Shire of Boddington and Wandering, Western Australia

Bannister
- Town
- Coordinates: 32.66°S 116.55°E
- Country: Australia
- State: Western Australia
- LGA(s): Shire of Boddington Shire of Wandering
- Location: 128 km (80 mi) from Perth; 5 km (3.1 mi) from Boddington

Government
  - State electorate(s): Central Wheatbelt
  - Federal division(s): O'Connor

Area
  - Total: 421.1 km^{2} (162.6 sq mi)

Population
  - Total(s): 72 (SAL 2021)
- Postcode: 6390
Localities around Bannister
| Mount Wells | North Bannister | North Bannister |
| Mount Wells | Bannister | Wandering |
| Wuraming | Boddington | Crossman |

Bannister is a rural locality, predominately located within the Shire of Boddington in the Peel Region of Western Australia. A smaller part of the locality, located on the eastern side of the Albany Highway, is within the Shire of Wandering in the Wheatbelt region of the state. The locality is also home to the majority of the Boddington Gold Mine operations.

Bannister is on the traditional land of the Wiilman people of the Noongar nation.

The name Bannister was originally applied to another townsite between Williams and Narrogin, which was surveyed in 1844 but no subdivision was carried out and the reserve cancelled in 1910. The modern Bannister locality is named after the Bannister River.

The site of the original police station house and coach house on Albany Highway is now occupied by the Riverside Roadhouse, which is a stop on the Transwa bus services to Albany and Esperance.
