= Hibbertia ambita =

Conservation status
- Priority One — Poorly Known Taxa (DEC)

Scientific classification
- Kingdom: Plantae
- Clade: Tracheophytes
- Clade: Angiosperms
- Clade: Eudicots
- Order: Dilleniales
- Family: Dilleniaceae
- Genus: Hibbertia
- Species: H. ambita

Binomial name
- Hibbertia ambita K.R.Thiele

Species of flowering plant

Hibbertia ambita is a species of flowering plant in the family Dilleniaceae and is endemic to a restricted area of Western Australia. It was first formally described in 2019 by Kevin Thiele in Australian Systematic Botany from specimens he collected near Boddington in 2015. The specific epithet (ambita) means "encircling" or "surrounding", referring to the arrangement of the stamens around the carpels. This hibbertia is only known from the Jarrah Forest biogeographic region in the south-west of Western Australia.

Hibbertia ambita is classified as "Priority One" by the Government of Western Australia Department of Parks and Wildlife, meaning that it is known from only one or a few locations which are potentially at risk.

== See also ==
- List of Hibbertia species
