= Crossman, Western Australia =

Crossman
- Town
- Coordinates: 32.80°S 116.61°E
- Country: Australia
- State: Western Australia
- LGA(s): Shire of Boddington
- Location: 125 km (78 mi) SSE of Perth, Western Australia
- Established: 1920s

Government
  - State electorate(s): Central Wheatbelt
  - Federal division(s): O'Connor

Area
  - Total: 137 km^{2} (53 sq mi)

Population
  - Total(s): 153 (SAL 2021)
- Postcode: 6390
Localities around Crossman
Bannister	Dwarda	Dwarda
Boddington	Crossman	Williams
Marradong	Marradong	Williams

Crossman is a locality in the Shire of Boddington in the Peel Region of Western Australia, 125 kilometres (78 mi) south-southeast of the state capital, Perth, along Albany Highway, and 12 kilometres (7.5 mi) east of Boddington.

Crossman was a stop on the Pinjarra to Narrogin railway line.

== Origin of the name ==
The name honours William Crossman of the Royal Engineers, who arrived in Fremantle as a second lieutenant stationed in Perth in 1852, but was responsible for works in the Albany district and for roads in the area. In 1853, in company with surveyor A. C. Gregory, Crossman examined and reported on various routes between Perth and Albany, and recommended that the then-current routes via York and Bunbury be replaced by a straight line between Kelmscott (now a Perth suburb near Armadale) and Albany. After serving as colonial magistrate, he returned to England in 1856 and later was promoted to captain and served as a British Member of Parliament for Portsmouth. The Crossman River, a 42-kilometre (26 mi) tributary of the Hotham River, was most likely named by Gregory in 1853.

== Present day ==
Crossman Wildflower Reserve, a year-round sanctuary for flora and fauna, is home to a wide range of native orchids.

Crossman is a stop on the Transwa bus services to Albany (GS1) and Esperance (GE1).
