= Upper Murray, Western Australia =

Locality in the Shire of Boddington, Western Australia

Upper Murray
- Town
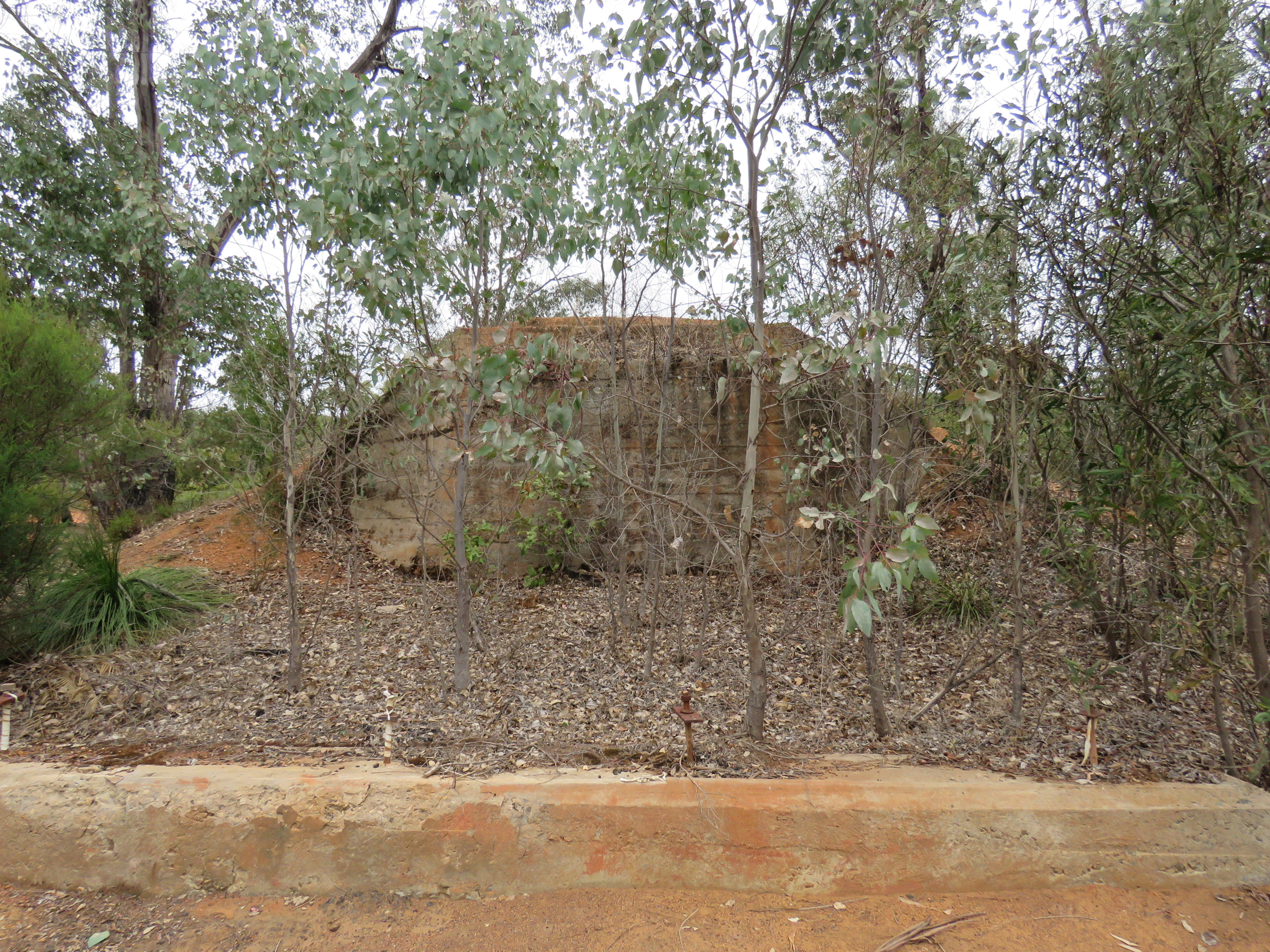
- Foundations of the former Long Gully Bridge
- Coordinates: 32.99°S 116.28°E
- Country: Australia
- State: Western Australia
- LGA(s): Shire of Boddington
- Location: 173 km (107 mi) from Perth; 31 km (19 mi) from Boddington

Government
  - State electorate(s): Central Wheatbelt
  - Federal division(s): O'Connor

Area
  - Total: 104.2 km^{2} (40.2 sq mi)

Population
  - Total(s): 0 (SAL 2021)
- Postcode: 6390
Localities around Upper Murray
Wuraming	Wuraming	Lower Hotham
Hoffman	Upper Murray	Lower Hotham
Hoffman	Yourdamunga Lake	Yourdamunga Lake

Upper Murray is a rural locality located in the Shire of Boddington in the Peel Region of Western Australia. The Murray River traverses the locality from its eastern to its western border.

Upper Murray is on the traditional land of the Wiilman people of the Noongar nation.

The state heritage listed Long Gully Bridge, also referred to as Asquith Bridge and crossing the Murray River, was located in the locality of Upper Murray, but was destroyed in a bush fire in February 2015 and never rebuilt. The former railway bridge was at the time used as part of the Bibbulmun Track.
