= Mount Saddleback =

Mountain in Western Australia

Highest point
- Elevation: 593 m (1,946 ft)
- Coordinates: 32°58′S 116°27′E

Geography
- Location: Peel region of Western Australia
- Parent range: Darling Range

Mount Saddleback is the highest peak in the Darling Range of Western Australia. It is found at the easternmost part of the Darling Range about 20 km (12 mi) south of Boddington and 40 km (25 mi) west of Williams.

Bauxite is mined on the flanks of the peak and processed at Worsley Alumina which has been in operation since 1984.

The entire range is formed by the Darling Fault, a 1,000 km (620 mi) fault that has been moving continually through its long history with the last major activity occurring 135 million years ago when Australia broke away from the super continent, Gondwana. The Darling Scarp formed around 570 million years ago and is composed of 3700 million-year-old rocks that are mostly granite. Saddleback is found on the eastern side of the fault on the Darling Plateau.

The underlying bedrock is composed of medium grained granite and sometimes Archean aged granitoids. The surface of the mount is an iron-rich hard cap with a thickness of around 6 m (20 ft) containing 40 to 50% Fe_{2}O_{3} including significant amounts of quartz sand. Below this is an Aluminium oxide enriched interval with clay rich base, with an average depth of 5.5 m (18 ft) and a maximum of up to 20 m (66 ft). Below this is a transition zone primarily made up of kaolin clays followed by weathered bedrock.

Above the bedrock the soils are composed of 25–30% bauxite with irregular and lenticular-shaped ore bodies. The largest ore body contains 20 million tonnes (44 billion pounds) over an area of 600 ha (1,500 acres) with many smaller bodies. The total estimated reserve of bauxite in the mining area is 400 million tonnes (880 billion pounds).
