= Shire of Williams =

- Local government area
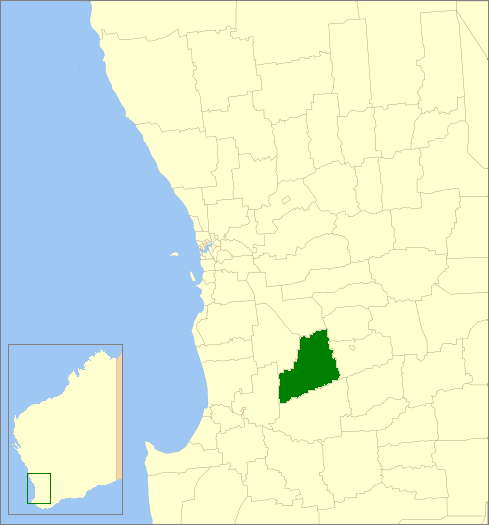
- Location in Western Australia

- Interactive map of Shire of Williams
- Country: Australia
- State: Western Australia
- Region: Wheatbelt
- Established: 1871
- Council seat: Williams

Government
  - Shire President: Jarrad Logie
  - State electorate: Roe
  - Federal division: O'Connor

Area
  - Total: 2,305.7 km^{2} (890.2 sq mi)

Population
  - Total: 1,021 (LGA 2021)
- Website: Shire of Williams
LGAs around Shire of Williams
Boddington	Wandering	Cuballing
Boddington	Shire of Williams	Narrogin
Collie	West Arthur	Wagin

The Shire of Williams is a local government area in the Wheatbelt region of Western Australia, about 161 kilometres (100 mi) southeast of the state capital, Perth. The Shire covers an area of 2,306 square kilometres (890 sq mi), and its seat of government is the town of Williams.

== History ==
The Williams Road District was created on 12 February 1871 as one of the first regional local government areas in Western Australia. On 1 July 1961 it became a shire following the enactment of the Local Government Act 1960, which reformed all road districts into shires.

== Wards ==
Until 2002, the Shire was divided into 3 wards - North West (1), North East (1) and Central (3). On 3 May 2003 all wards were abolished and councillors sit at large.

== Towns and localities ==
The towns and localities of the Shire of Williams with population and size figures based on the most recent Australian census:

Locality	Population	Area	Map
Dardadine	15 (SAL 2021)	70.1 km^{2} (27.1 sq mi)	
Meeking	10 (SAL 2021)	97.3 km^{2} (37.6 sq mi)	
Williams	996 (SAL 2021)	2,135.7 km^{2} (824.6 sq mi)	

== Former towns ==
- Congelin

== Population ==
Historical population

Year	Pop.	±% p.a.
1911	866	—
1921	772	−1.14%
1933	929	+1.55%
1947	933	+0.03%
1954	1,413	+6.11%
1961	1,330	−0.86%
1966	1,193	−2.15%
1971	1,177	−0.27%
1976	1,178	+0.02%

Year	Pop.	±% p.a.
1981	1,174	−0.07%
1986	1,146	−0.48%
1991	1,005	−2.59%
1996	1,018	+0.26%
2001	869	−3.12%
2006	863	−0.14%
2011	914	+1.15%
2016	981	+1.42%
2021	1,021	+0.80%

== Notable councillors ==
- Frederick Piesse, Williams Roads Board member 1880–1889, chairman 1886–1889; later a state MP

== Heritage-listed places ==
As of 2023, 322 places are heritage-listed in the Shire of Williams, of which two are on the State Register of Heritage Places.

Place name	Place #	Street name	Suburb or town	Co-ordinates	Built	State registered	Notes & former names	Photo
Sherry's House and Wayside Inn site	2739	Williams Road	Quindanning	33.043527°S 116.56822°E	1926		Quindanning Inn Located behind the Quindanning Hotel	
Quindanning Hotel	16215	Pinjarra-Williams Road	Quindanning	33.043828°S 116.568288°E	1908	25 June 2010	Ye Olde Quindanning Inne	
