= Shire of Boddington =

Coordinates: 32°48′07″S 116°28′16″E

- Local government area
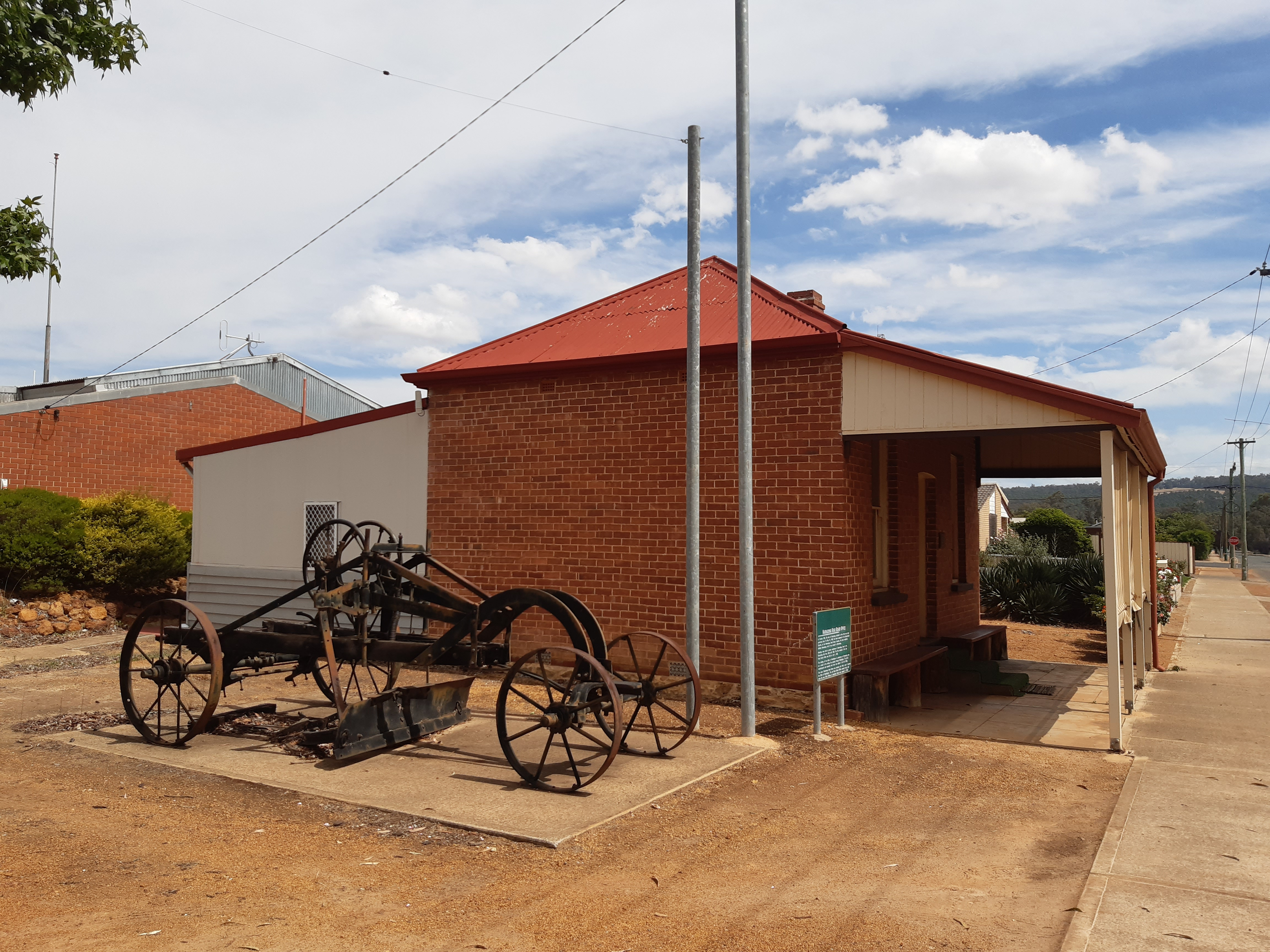
- The heritage listed Marradong Road Board Office in Boddington, in use from 1925 to 1965

- Interactive map of Shire of Boddington
- Country: Australia
- State: Western Australia
- Region: Peel
- Established: 1892
- Council seat: Boddington

Government
  - Shire President: Garry Ventris
  - State electorate: Central Wheatbelt
  - Federal division: Canning

Area
  - Total: 1,900.6 km^{2} (733.8 sq mi)

Population
  - Total: 1,705 (LGA 2021)
- Website: Shire of Boddington
LGAs around Shire of Boddington
| Murray | | Wandering |
| Waroona | Shire of Boddington | Wandering |
| Harvey | Collie | Williams |

The Shire of Boddington is a local government area in the Peel region of Western Australia, about 120 kilometres (75 mi) south-east of the state capital, Perth. The Shire covers an area of 1,901 square kilometres (734 sq mi), and its seat of government is the town of Boddington.

== History ==
The Mooradung Road District was established on 19 May 1892. It was renamed the Marradong Road District on 30 October 1903.

The board initially convened at Marradong 8 km to the south of Boddington, but relocated to Boddington in 1925 after the arrival of the railway and construction of suitable buildings. On 1 July 1961, the Marradong Road District became the Shire of Boddington following the passage of the Local Government Act 1960, which reformed all remaining road districts into shires.

== Wards ==
The Shire has been divided into 2 wards.

- Town Ward (4 councillors)
- Rural Ward (3 councillors)

=== 2023 election results ===
Three vacancies were not filled and a by-election was held in 2024.

2023 Western Australian local elections: Boddington
| Party | Candidate | Votes | % | ±% |
|---|---|---|---|---|
| Independent | Eugene Smalberger (elected) | unopposed | | |
| Registered electors | | 1,247 | | |

== Towns and localities ==
The towns and localities of the Shire of Boddington with population and size figures based on the most recent Australian census:

| Suburb | Population | Area | Map |
|---|---|---|---|
| Bannister * | 72 (SAL 2021) | 421.1 km^{2} (162.6 sq mi) | |
| Boddington | 1,178 (SAL 2021) | 114.6 km^{2} (44.2 sq mi) | |
| Crossman | 153 (SAL 2021) | 137 km^{2} (53 sq mi) | |
| Marradong | 58 (SAL 2021) | 323 km^{2} (125 sq mi) | |
| Lower Hotham | 13 (SAL 2021) | 118.5 km^{2} (45.8 sq mi) | |
| Mount Wells | 0 (SAL 2016) | 236 km^{2} (91 sq mi) | |
| Quindanning | 43 (SAL 2021) | 152.8 km^{2} (59.0 sq mi) | |
| Ranford | 201 (SAL 2021) | 2 km^{2} (0.77 sq mi) | |
| Upper Murray | 0 (SAL 2021) | 104.2 km^{2} (40.2 sq mi) | |
| Wuraming | 0 (SAL 2016) | 349.5 km^{2} (134.9 sq mi) | |

* Indicates locality is only partially located within the Shire of Boddington

== Population ==
Historical population

| Year | Pop. | ±% p.a. |
|---|---|---|
| 1921 | 675 | — |
| 1933 | 918 | +2.60% |
| 1947 | 1,275 | +2.37% |
| 1954 | 1,250 | −0.28% |
| 1961 | 967 | −3.60% |
| 1966 | 761 | −4.68% |
| 1971 | 714 | −1.27% |
| 1976 | 720 | +0.17% |
| 1981 | 778 | +1.56% |

| Year | Pop. | ±% p.a. |
|---|---|---|
| 1986 | 911 | +3.21% |
| 1991 | 1,416 | +9.22% |
| 1996 | 1,516 | +1.37% |
| 2001 | 1,401 | −1.57% |
| 2006 | 1,379 | −0.32% |
| 2011 | 2,226 | +10.05% |
| 2016 | 1,844 | −3.70% |
| 2021 | 1,705 | −1.56% |

== Heritage-listed places ==
As of 2023, 61 places are heritage-listed in the Shire of Boddington, of which one is listed on the State Register of Heritage Places, Asquith Bridge, which was completely destroyed in the bush fire in 2015.
