= Murray River (Western Australia) =

River in Peel region of Western Australia

Coordinates: 32°35′0″S 115°46′17″E

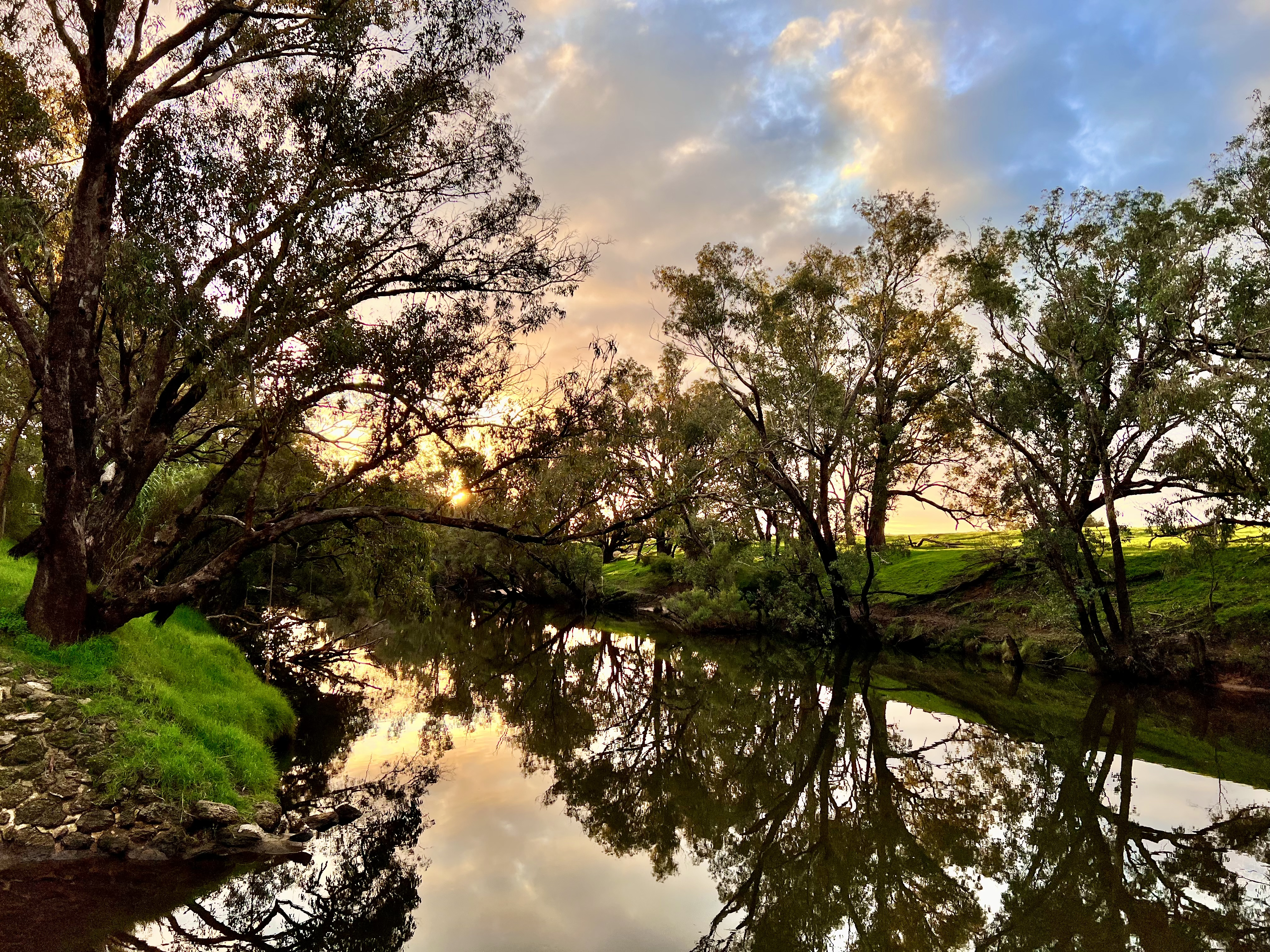
- Murray River in Pinjarra, Western Australia in June 2022

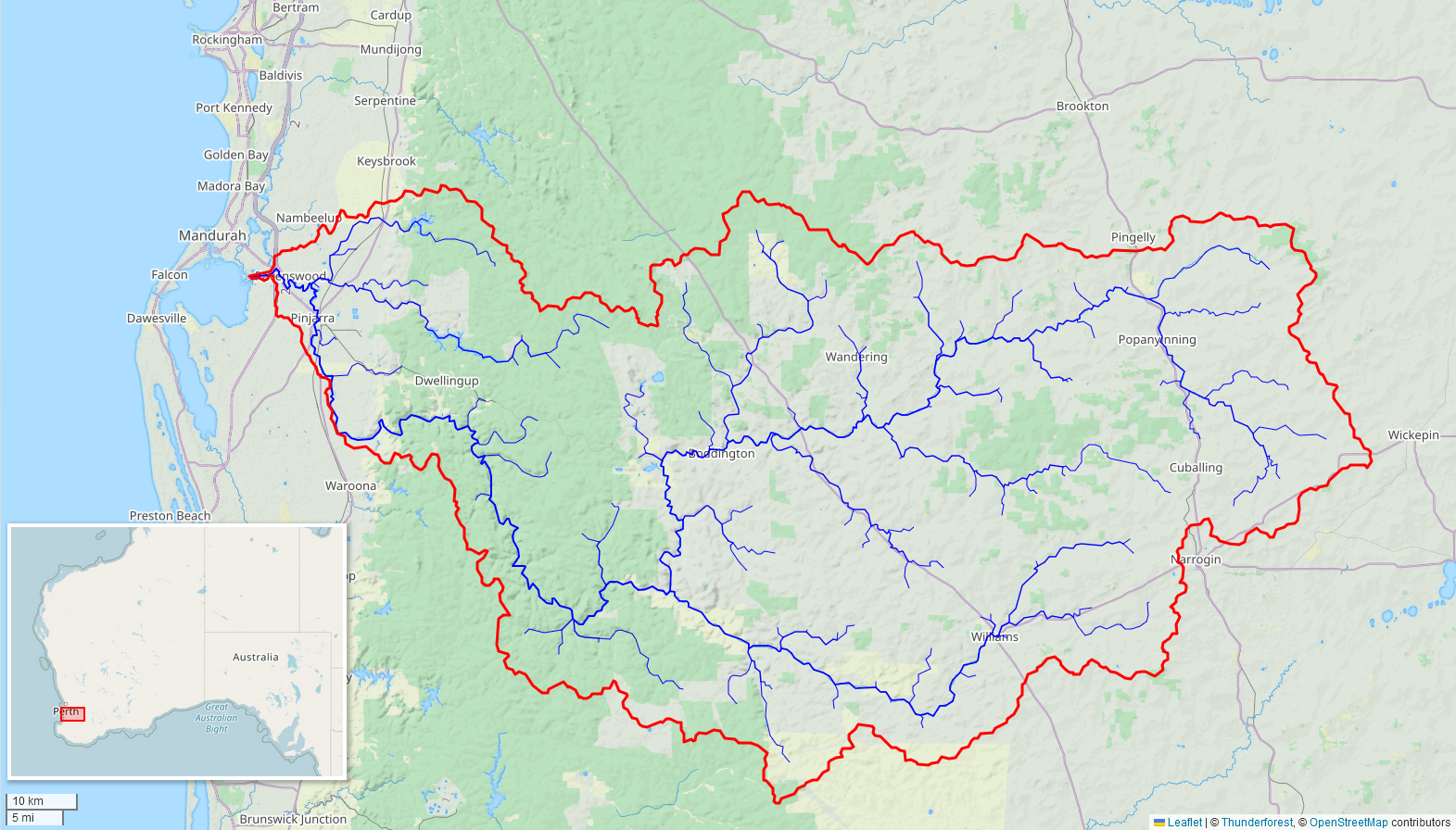
- Murray River watershed (Interactive map)

Location
- Country: Australia

Physical characteristics
- Source
  - location: Mount Keats
  - elevation: 187 metres (614 ft)
- Mouth
  - location: Peel-Harvey Estuary
  - elevation: sea level
- Length: 134 kilometres (83 mi)

The Murray River is a river in the southwest of Western Australia. It played a significant part in the expansion of settlement in the area south of Perth after the arrival of British settlers at the Swan River Colony in 1829. It should not be confused with the Murray River in southeastern Australia, which is the longest river in the country.

The river is one of the few major rivers close to Perth which is devoid of dams for public water supply. It includes a catchment area including a large part of the wheatbelt and southwest of the state, draining from 450 mm (18 in) per annum average rainfall country in the east near Pingelly, westward through the high rainfall parts of the Darling Range around Dwellingup with an average rainfall of 1,300 mm (51 in) per annum.

The first of the two major tributaries, the Hotham River, starts its journey near Narrogin. The other major tributary is the Williams River, which starts between Williams and Narrogin. These two tributaries are the main rivers which drain the eastern wheat-belt.

The Murray River then flows through forested high-rainfall parts of the Darling Range to emerge near Pinjarra.

Another tributary, the Dandalup River, joins the Murray a short distance downstream of Pinjarra. This section is known as the lower Murray and is navigable in small boats. The river then flows across the sand plain between the Darling Scarp and the coast to empty into the Peel Estuary near Mandurah.

The canal development of North and South Yunderup is situated several kilometres upstream from the estuary.

== History ==
The first European exploration of the area was in July 1829 when a group, led by Captain Currie of HMS Challenger and accompanied by botanist James Drummond, marched a short distance inland from present-day Rockingham and after climbing a small hill at what is now Baldivis, sighted a river in the distance. This was later named the Serpentine River, which is to the north of the Murray and for some time was confused with the Murray, which was not encountered until later that year.

In November, Dr Alexander Collie and Lieutenant William Preston and crew from HMS Sulphur piloted two whaleboats out of Cockburn Sound and at midday on 17 November 1829 crossed the ocean bar at present-day Mandurah. After camping overnight, they sailed south down the Peel-Harvey Estuary to the southern extreme near the delta of the Harvey River, where they had an amicable encounter with some local Aboriginal people.

Due to strong winds, they sailed north out of the estuary without exploring the Eastern shore where the Murray River enters the estuary. The group then exited through the ocean bar and sailed south along the coast as far as the Collie and Preston Rivers and the Leschenault Inlet before returning to the Peel-Harvey estuary on 28 November 1829. From there they explored the Murray River delta, which at the time included five entrances into the estuary. The boats managed to navigate about 3 kilometres (2 mi) up the river before returning to Fremantle after the 12-day trip. This was their first actual encounter with the Murray River and it was named by Governor James Stirling after the Secretary of State for the Colonial Office in London, Sir George Murray.

Within a few months, settlers from the Swan River had started to explore the river and choose blocks along its banks.

=== Thomas Peel ===
Thomas Peel had left Britain with a promise that if he arrived at Fremantle by the beginning of November 1829 with 400 settlers, he would be allocated a grant of 1,000 square kilometres (250,000 acres), comprising much of the land on the south bank of the Swan River to Cockburn Sound. As he arrived six weeks late and with only 169 settlers, the offer was withdrawn by Stirling as the land had been granted to established settlers. Peel was offered an alternative grant from Woodman Point to the north bank of the Murray River and from the ocean to the Darling Scarp.

Peel's remaining settlers arrived shortly after and settled initially at Clarence before moving to the site of present-day Mandurah, which he named Peeltown.

Despite many problems faced by the settlers, the area gradually expanded, and a settlement at Pinjarra was established by late 1830. Pinjarra was approximately the upper limit of navigable water along the Murray River. It also had a natural ford for travellers at nearby Oakley Brook.

More land allocations along the southern bank of the river were made; however, settlement seemed to be limited to no further south than the Murray River grants, partly because of continuing and increasing conflicts with local Aboriginal people. These conflicts culminated in the infamous Pinjarra massacre in October 1834 during which an uncertain number of Noongar people of the local Pindjarup tribal group were killed. The massacre by a detachment of 25 soldiers, police and settlers, led by Stirling, followed a raid in Perth by members of the Murray River tribe. The following year, a formal truce was made between the Murray River and the Swan River Noongars and the white settlers.

Relative peace was established and expansion around the towns of Pinjarra increased. The opening of the Perth to Bunbury railway in 1893 further expanded the area. Almost immediately after farming commenced, settlers realised that the soils surrounding the lower reaches of the river suffered badly from annual flooding caused by a very low fall between the base of the scarp and the estuary, a distance of about 40 kilometres (25 mi). The problem was exacerbated by extensive clearing of trees in the foothills which would have otherwise helped remove the excess water. Settlers described a giant wetland with travel impossible for several months each year.

From 1900 to about the end of the Second World War, a concerted effort at draining the flood-prone areas was made and today, about one-third of all land with the Peel-Harvey catchment is within 100 m (328 ft) of a constructed drain, stream or river.

== See also ==
- List of watercourses in Western Australia

== General references ==
- Brearley, Anne (2005). Ernest Hodgkin's Swanland : estuaries and coastal lagoons of South-western Australia. Crawley, W.A.: University of Western Australia Press for the Ernest Hodgkin Trust for Estuary Education and Research and National Trust of Australia (WA). ISBN 1-920694-38-2.
- Bradby, K (1997). Peel-Harvey. Greening the Catchment Taskforce. ISBN 0-7309-8041-3.
- C. T. Stannage, ed. (1981). "The First Western Australians". A New History of Western Australia. Nedlands: UWA Publishing. ISBN 0-85564-181-9. LCCN 82101009. OCLC 963830667. OL 3517729M. Wikidata Q125995168.
