= Marradong, Western Australia =

Marradong
- Town
- Interactive map of Marradong
- Coordinates: 32°51′47″S 116°27′04″E
- Country: Australia
- State: Western Australia
- LGA: Shire of Boddington
- Location: 131 km (81 mi) SE of Perth; 8 km (5.0 mi) S of Boddington
- Established: 1890s

Government
  - State electorate: Central Wheatbelt
  - Federal division: O'Connor

Area
  - Total: 323 km^{2} (125 sq mi)

Population
  - Total: 58 (SAL 2021)
- Postcode: 6390
Localities around Marradong
Wuraming	Boddington	Crossman
Lower Hotham	Marradong	Williams
Lower Hotham	Quinndaning	Williams

Marradong is a former town located 8 kilometres (5 mi) south of Boddington along the road from Pinjarra to Williams.

== History ==
Marradong was the major centre in the region until the 1920s, having been settled by the Batt, Pollard and Fawcett families, and once boasted a shop, post office, hotel, church, telegraph station and a one-roomed school. The town was also the home of the Marradong Road Board, first convened in 1903. After the arrival of the railway in Boddington, most facilities moved there and by 1930 Marradong had been largely abandoned.

All that remains of the town is the tiny St Albans Anglican Church and cemetery (1894), a few old homes in varying states of repair and some palm trees which once stood outside the Laura Hotel. The agricultural hall was demolished in 1989 and a small fire station has been built on the site. The locality is now mostly inhabited by local farmers who primarily produce wool, lamb, beef, oats, hay, barley, lupins, canola and timber.
