= Williams River (Western Australia) =

River in Western Australia

Coordinates: 32°58′34″S 116°23′51″E

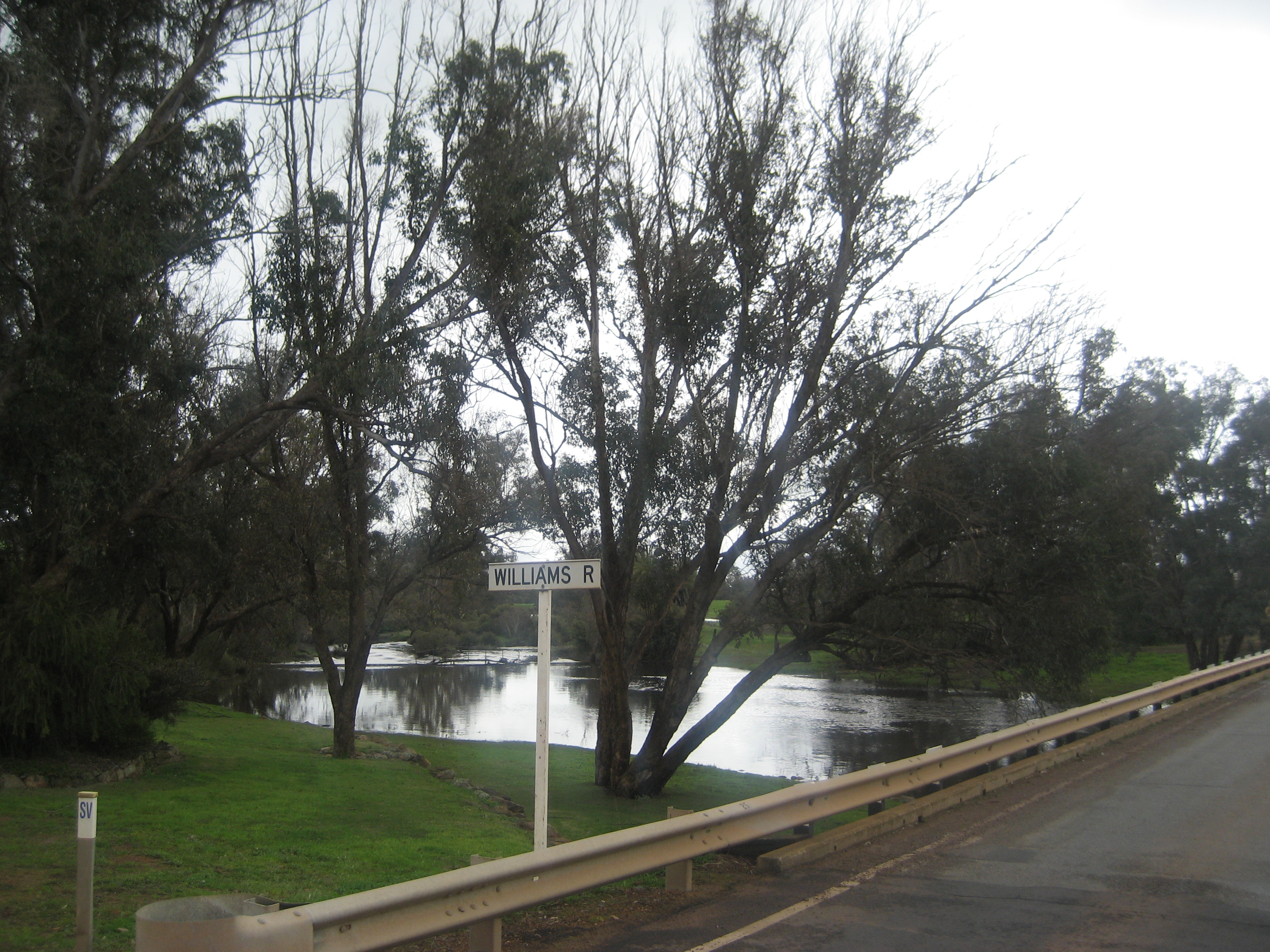
- Williams River in flood at Williams August 2009

Location
- Country: Australia

Physical characteristics
- Source
  - elevation: 323 metres (1,060 ft)
- Mouth
  - location: confluence with Hotham River
  - elevation: 183 metres (600 ft)
- Length: 88 kilometres (55 mi)

The Williams River is one of the two major tributaries of the Murray River in Western Australia, the other being the Hotham River.

It starts between Williams and Narrogin and flows in a general westerly direction before it joins the Hotham River to become the Murray River near Mount Saddleback.

The river has 12 tributaries including Coolakin Gully, Warrening Gully, Junction Brook, Coalling Brook, Jim Went Creek and Fitts Creek.
