= Quindanning, Western Australia =

Quindanning
- Town
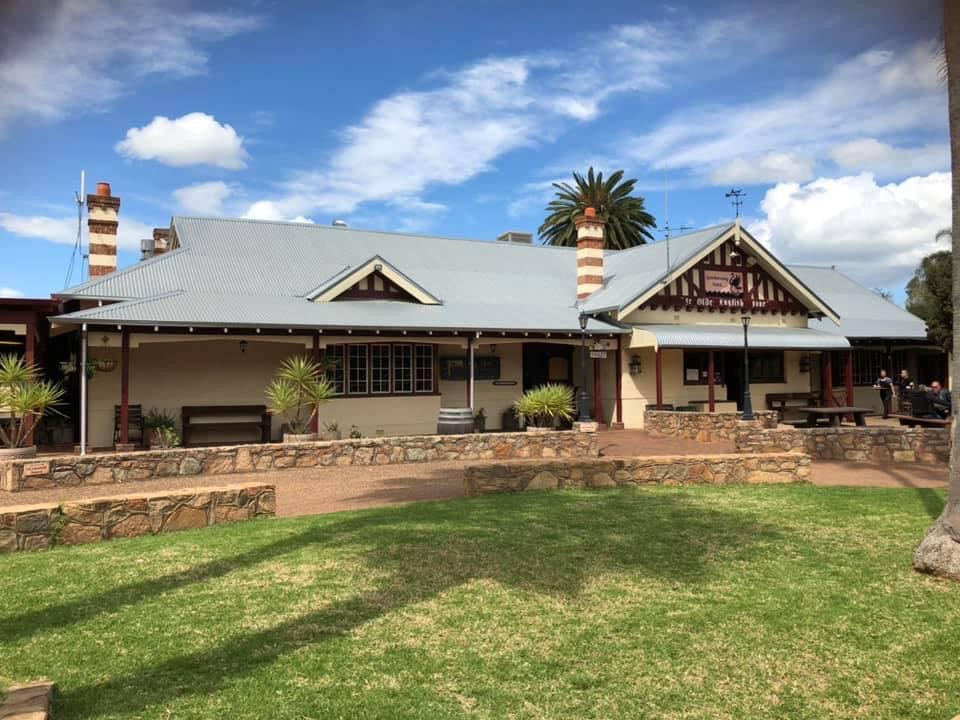
- The State heritage listed Quindanning Hotel in September 2020
- Coordinates: 33°04′00″S 116°33′00″E
- Country: Australia
- State: Western Australia
- LGA(s): Shire of Boddington Shire of Williams
- Location: 158 km (98 mi) from Perth; 35 km (22 mi) from Williams
- Established: 1906

Government
  - State electorate(s): Central Wheatbelt
  - Federal division(s): O'Connor

Area
  - Total: 152.8 km^{2} (59.0 sq mi)

Population
  - Total(s): 43 (SAL 2021)
- Postcode: 6391
Localities around Quindanning
Lower Hotham	Marradong	Williams
Yourdamung Lake	Quindanning	Williams
Yourdamung Lake	Williams	Williams

Quindanning is a small town located halfway between Boddington and Williams along the Pinjarra-Williams Road. At the 2006 census, Quindanning had a population of 163.

The town is named after Quindanning Pool, located along the Williams River. The name is of Aboriginal origin, and was first recorded in 1835 when it was discovered by Alfred Hillman. Low-level agricultural settlement occurred in the 1830s. By 1900, a school and racecourse had been built and in 1907 a townsite was surveyed and gazetted around it.

Quindanning was one of the centres ministered to by the Brotherhood of St. Boniface, which was stationed in Williams from 1911 to 1929. To honour their work, the Quindanning Anglican church was named after their patron when it was consecrated in 1956. The church is constructed of stone carted from local properties by members of the church; the estimated cost of the building at the time of its construction was 4,600 pounds.

The Quindanning Hotel had origins in a mud-brick building, with a Wayside Licence issued on 3 December 1900. The building was substantially renovated in 1921 to become a well-known "inland resort hotel" between 1925 and the late 1950s. During the 1930s the hotel had a 9-hole golf course, horse riding, game hunting and swimming at Quindanning Pool.

At periods during the town's history, Quindanning has had a general store, post office, hairdresser and café. Currently, the town has a hotel/tavern, church, community hall and a racecourse – the latter used annually for the Quindanning Picnic Race Day, held on Easter Saturday.
