= Pinjarra to Narrogin railway line =

Former railway line in Western Australia

Pinjarra to Narrogin railway
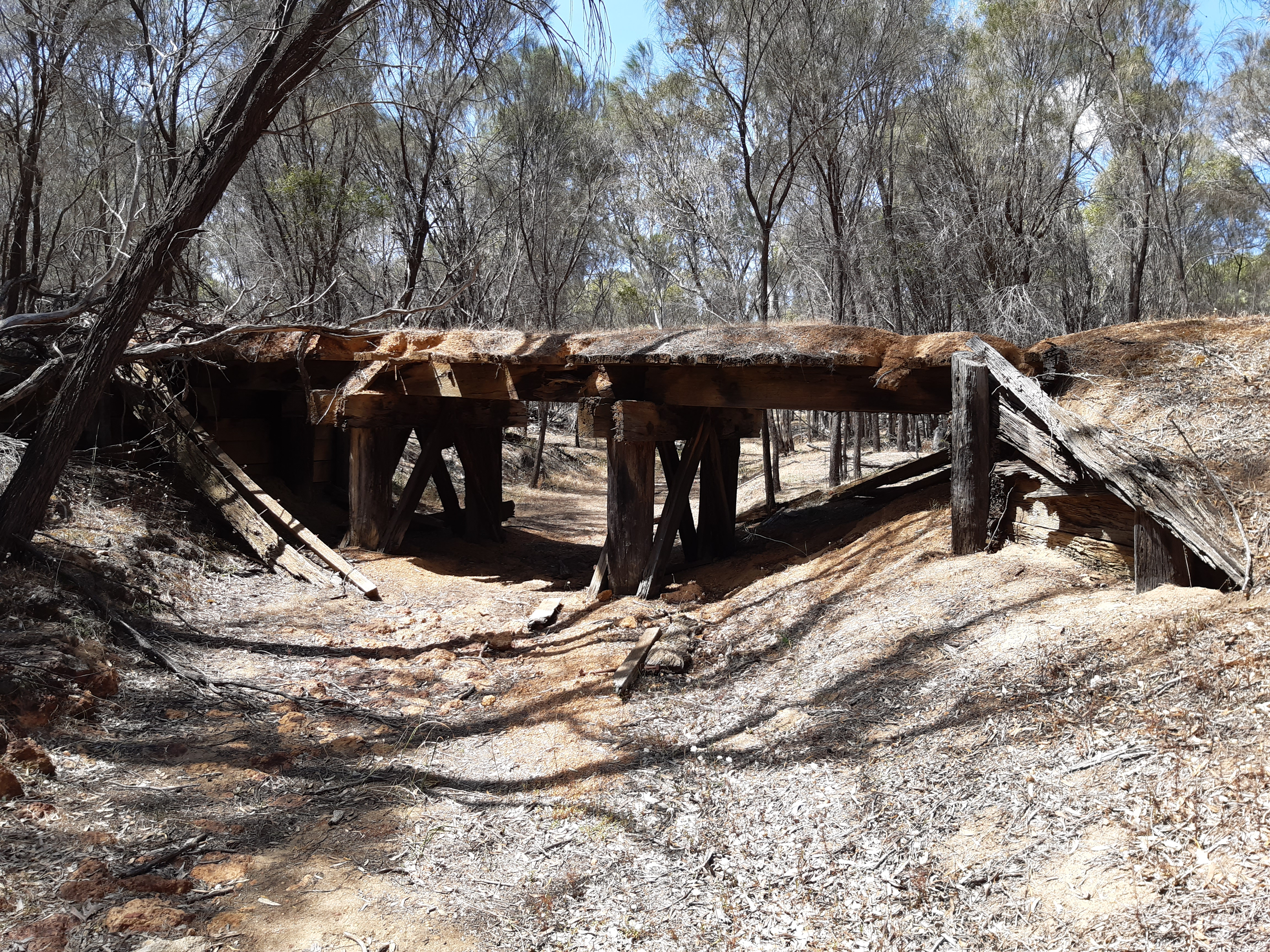
- Remnants of a bridge of the former line at Congelin, Dryandra Woodland

Overview
- Owner: Western Australian Government Railways
- Termini: Pinjarra; Narrogin

Service
- Operator(s): Western Australian Government Railways

History
- Opened: in stages between 1910 & 1927

Technical
- Line length: 153 km (95 mi)
- Track gauge: 1,067 mm (3 ft 6 in)
- Pinjarra to Narrogin railway Main locations

The Pinjarra to Narrogin railway was a 153 kilometre cross-country railway line built between the towns of Pinjarra and Narrogin in Western Australia.

== History ==
The line was opened in stages between 1910 and 1927 (with construction being delayed by the onset of the First World War) to service the booming timber industry as well as rural and fruit-growing establishments between the two termini. Pinjarra and Narrogin are located on the Western Australian Government Railways' South Western and Great Southern main lines respectively, and as such the Pinjarra to Narrogin railway provided an important link between the two, providing a rail transport link to towns and mills along the way, such as Dwellingup and Boddington, both of which continue to be significant settlements in the region.

The Pinjarra–Marrinup Railway Act 1907, an act by the Parliament of Western Australia granted assent on 20 December 1907, authorised the construction of the railway line from Pinjarra to Marrinup. The Pinjarra to Dwellingup and Dwellingup to Holyoake sections of the rail the railway were both approved for construction in December 1908, with the former officially opened on 28 February and the latter on 1 July 1910. Both sections were constructed by the Public Works Department (PWD).

The Dwellingup–Hotham Railway Act 1911, assented to on 16 February 1911, authorised construction of the railway line from Dwellingup to Hotham.

Construction of the Holyoake to Dwarda section of the railway line was awarded to the PWD on 12 February 1910 and the line was opened on 8 August 1913.

In 1912, two more acts concerning this railway were passed, the Hotham–Crossman Railway Act 1911 and the Hotham–Crossman Railway Extension Act 1912, assented to 9 January and 24 December 1912.

The Pinjarra–Dwarda Railway Extension Act 1914 was assented to on 18 February 1915 and authorised the construction of the railway line extension from Dwarda to Narrogin. The final section Dwarda to Narrogin was not awarded for construction to the PWD until 24 July 1925, and officially opened on 18 September 1926.

In 1954, the state government of Western Australia had compiled a list of loss-making railway operations, of which the Pinjarra to Narrogin line was one. Figures were reported for two separate sections of the line, split at Dwarda. The section from Pinjarra to Dwarda had a total expenditure of almost five times its earnings in the financial year to June 1953, £58,436 expenditure versus earnings of £12,316. Figures for the Dwarda to narrogin section were far worse, with an expenditure of £12,198 while earning just £915.

The Railways (Cue-Big Bell and other Railways) Discontinuance Act 1960 officially closed the Boddington to Narrogin section of the line, which was assented to on 12 December 1960. This act affected a number of Western Australian railways, officially closing 13 lines in the state.

The Railways Discontinuance and Land Revestment Act 1975, assented to on 18 September 1975, closed the Dwellingup to Boddington section of the railway line.

The closing of many of the local timber mills led to a gradual decline in traffic on the line and, accordingly, commercial services were withdrawn progressively until cessation of the last remaining service in 1984. However, the Hotham Valley Railway has operated a heritage railway over a thirty-two kilometre section of the line as far as Etmilyn from 1974 onwards and continues to do so.

== Legacy ==
Only the section of the railway line from Pinjarra to Dwellingup is still shown as operated by third parties on contemporary railway maps.

At the western terminus of the former line, the Pinjarra Railway Yards is on the Western Australian State Register of Heritage Places, as is the Narrogin Railway Station at the eastern end of the line, also both predate the establishment of the Pinjarra to Narrogin railway.

The Pinjarra to Boddington railway route was assessed for heritage value but found to be not significant enough to warrant inclusion in the Shire of Murray's heritage list. However, in the neighbouring Shire of Boddington, the railway line precinct from Boddington to Dwellingup is on the shire's heritage list.

At Congelin, in the Shire of Williams, the site of the former railway siding is on the shire's heritage list but only earthworks now remain for the former siding.
