= Boddington gold mine =

Gold and copper mine in Western Australia

Boddington
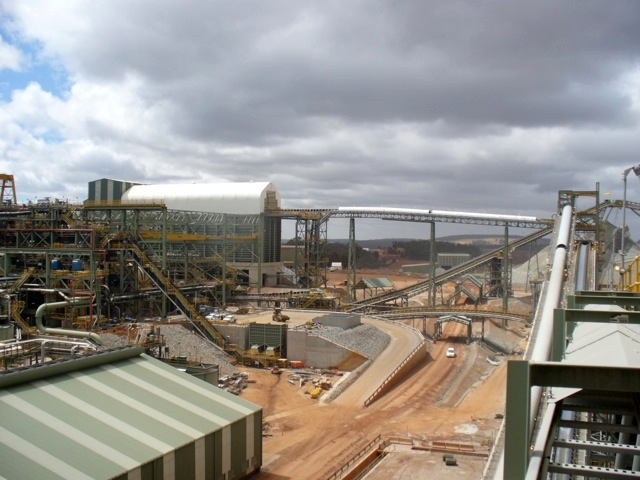
- Boddington gold mine

- Location in Western Australia
- Interactive map of Boddington
- Location: Boddington, Western Australia, Australia; 32°45′07″S 116°21′00″E
- Products: Gold, copper
- Production: 23,200 kg (745,000 ozt) gold; 44 million kg (98 million lb) copper
- Financial year: 2023
- Type: Open pit
- Opened: 1987
- Active: 31
- Company: Newmont
- Website: www.newmont.com/operations-and-projects/global-presence/australia/boddington-au/default.aspx

The Boddington gold mine is a gold and copper mine located 13 km (8.1 mi) northwest of Boddington, Western Australia. The mine is within the Saddleback Greenstone Belt, an Archaean structure in the southwestern Yilgarn craton.

Officially reopened on 3 February 2010, the mine is Australia's biggest producing gold mine by 2022. eclipsing the Super Pit. In the 2018 financial year, Boddington gold mine produced 709 thousand troy ounces (22.1 tonnes) of gold and 77 million pounds (35 thousand tonnes) of copper. Reserves at 31 December 2018 were reported as 12.4 million troy ounces (390 tonnes) of gold and 1,250 million pounds (570 thousand tonnes) of copper. At 2018 production rates, this equates to reserves for 17.5 years of gold production and 16.2 years of copper production. That is, until 27 June 2036 and 26 March 2035 respectively. The mine buys 15 years of power from the 222 MW Collgar Wind Farm.

== History ==
A large open-cut mining operation, it commenced in 1987 and ceased mining on 30 November 2001 after the known oxide ore resource had been processed.

Partly owned by Normandy Mining (44.44%), Acacia Resources (33.33%) and Newcrest (22.23%), the Normandy share was acquired by Newmont when it took over the company in 2002, while AngloGold took over Acacia.

In 2005, Newcrest sold its interest in Boddington for A$225 million, also to Newmont.

A bedrock resource of almost 20 million troy ounces (620 million grams) was identified and expansion of the facility to allow mining and processing of basement rock was approved in 2002. Construction on the expansion project began in May 2006. At the time it was projected that once the mine achieves full nameplate throughput it would become Australia's largest gold mine.

On 29 January 2009, Newmont announced that it had raised $1.5 billion to acquire AngloGold's ownership position of 33% in the mine and thus became sole owner. Now fully owned by Newmont, the mine reopened in 2009 after a major expansion project that increased the throughput to become Australia's largest gold mine.

In 2005, EPCM contract was awarded to Clough Group. In 2006, the EPCM contract was awarded to Aker Kvaerner. In 2010, ThyssenKrupp Robins had set up the High Pressure Grinding Rolls using the drive system provided by ABB. The environmental impact statement for the most recent expansion in 2013 was developed by Strategen Environmental Consultants. Macmohan was assigned for the gold mining operations.

The official startup was on 23 July 2009, with the mine estimated at the time to have a 20-year life producing more than 1 million troy ounces (31 million grams) of gold per year. The official opening of the mine was on 3 February 2010, conducted by Premier of Western Australia Colin Barnett.

Newmont's first 1 million troy ounces (31 million grams) at Boddington was achieved in March 2011.

== Production ==
=== Gold ===
Annual gold production of the mine:

Year	Production	Grade	Cost per ounce
1999	231,695 ounces	0.89 g/t	A$332
2000	228,859 ounces	0.89 g/t	A$371
2001	227,171 ounces	0.97 g/t	A$376
Jan - Sep 2002	4,235 ounces		
2003–2009	inactive		
2009	122,000 ounces	0.907 g/t	US$468
2010	728,000 ounces	0.851 g/t	US$590
2011	741,000 ounces	0.737 g/t	US$682
2012	724,000 ounces	0.709 g/t	US$877
2013	704,000 ounces	0.680 g/t	US$1,083
2014	696,000 ounces	0.624 g/t	US$972
2015	794,000 ounces	0.680 g/t	US$799
2016	800,000 ounces	0.652 g/t	US$775
2017	787,000 ounces	0.624 g/t	US$835
2018	709,000 ounces	0.539 g/t	US$786
2019	703,000 ounces	0.539 g/t	US$809
2020	670,000 ounces	0.609 g/t	US$1,094
2021	696,000 ounces	0.651 g/t	US$1,083
2022	798,000 ounces	0.801 g/t	US$921
2023	745,000 ounces	0.754 g/t	US$1,067

=== Copper ===
Annual copper production of the mine:

Year	Production	Grade
2009	10,000,000 pounds	0.14%
2010	58,000,000 pounds	0.12%
2011	69,000,000 pounds	0.13%
2012	67,000,000 pounds	0.13%
2013	66,000,000 pounds	0.13%
2014	69,000,000 pounds	0.12%
2015	79,000,000 pounds	0.13%
2016	77,000,000 pounds	0.13%
2017	80,000,000 pounds	0.13%
2018	77,000,000 pounds	0,12%
2019	64,000,000 pounds	0.10%
2020	56,000,000 pounds	0.08%
2021	71,000,000 pounds	0.11%
2022	84,000,000 pounds	0.14%
2023	98,000,000 pounds	0.16%

== See also ==
- List of active gold mines in Western Australia
