= Hotham River =

River in Western Australia

Coordinates: 32°58′S 116°22′E

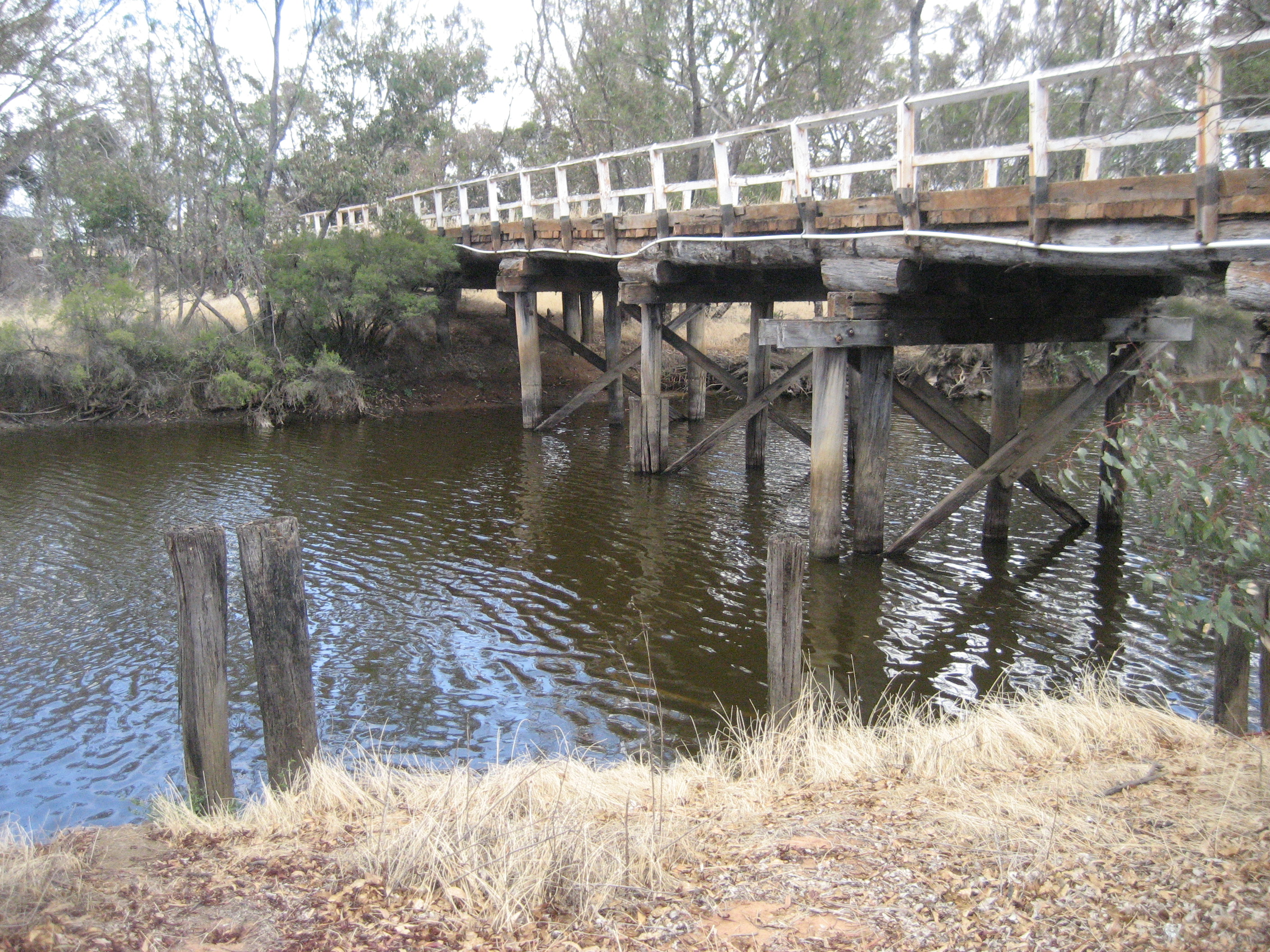
- The Hotham River at Pumphreys Bridge, between Narrogin and Wandering

Location
- Country: Australia

The Hotham River is one of the major tributaries of the Murray River in Western Australia. It is about 160 kilometres (99 mi) long with its upper reaches being the Hotham River North, which begins in the Dutarning Range and joins the Hotham at its crossing of the Great Southern Highway near Popanyinning. A 15 km (9.3 mi) long southern tributary, Hotham River South, begins near Cuballing and flows generally northerly before joining the Hotham near Yornaning.

From Narrogin, the merged river flows in a northerly direction through the Cuballing district and Dryandra Woodland before heading west through Wandering and Boddington.

The river joins the Williams River near Mount Saddleback.

== History ==
The river was explored by Thomas Bannister in 1830 and probably named by Governor James Stirling after Admiral Sir Henry Hotham.

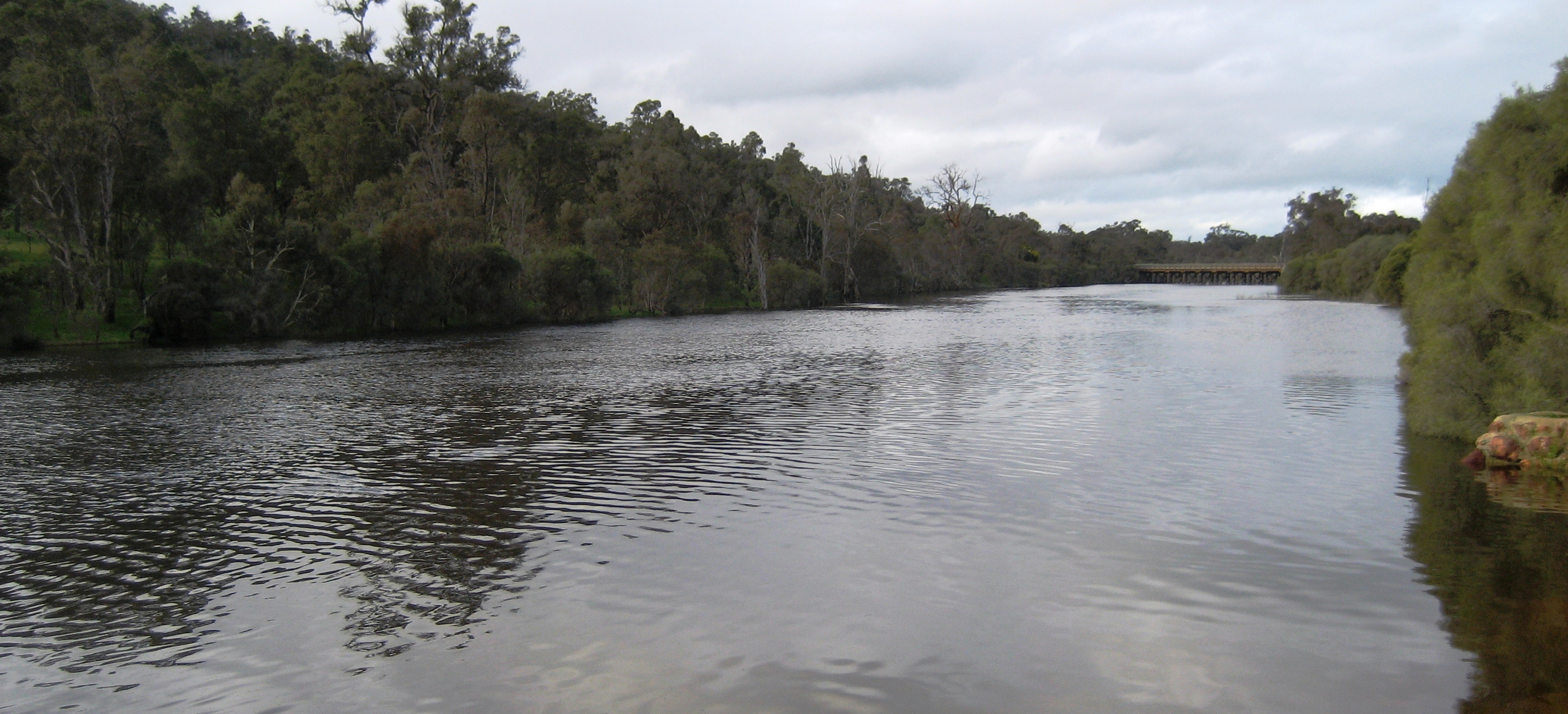
Hotham River at Boddington

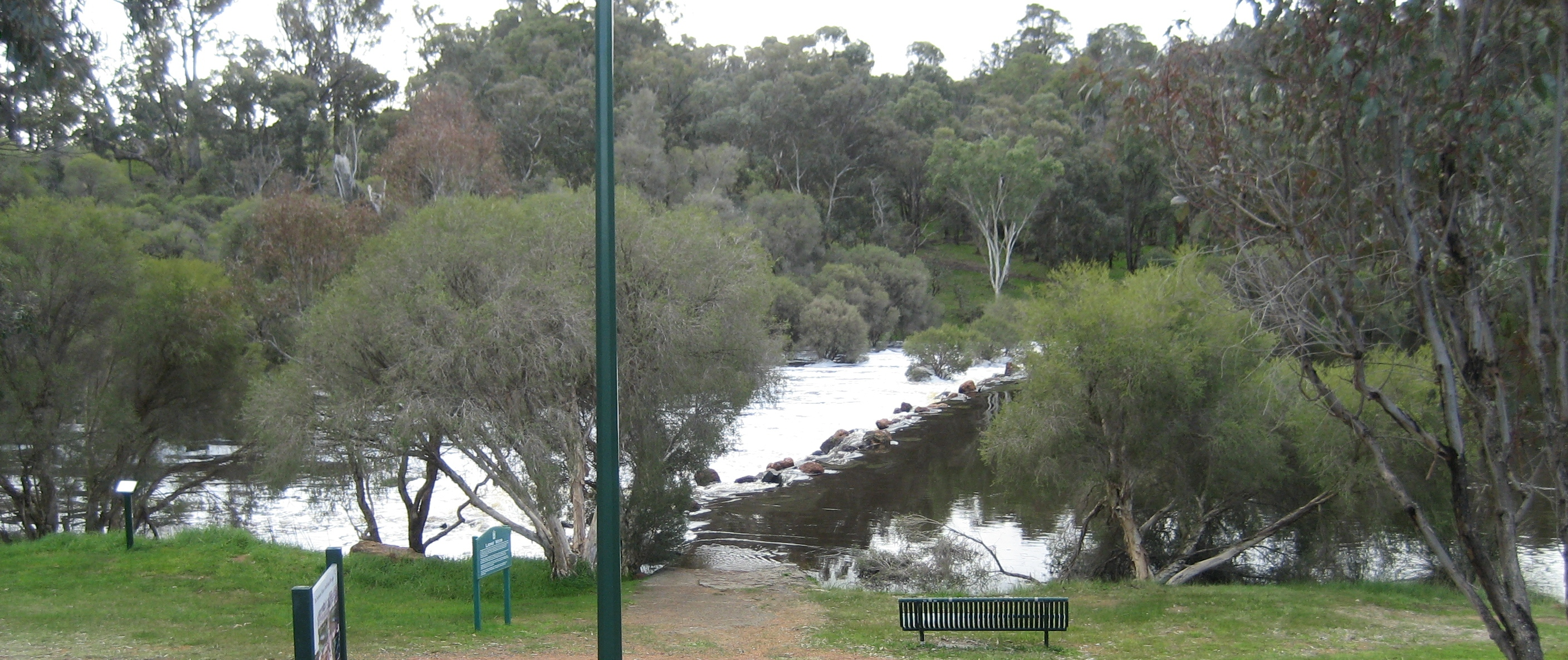
Weir at Boddington

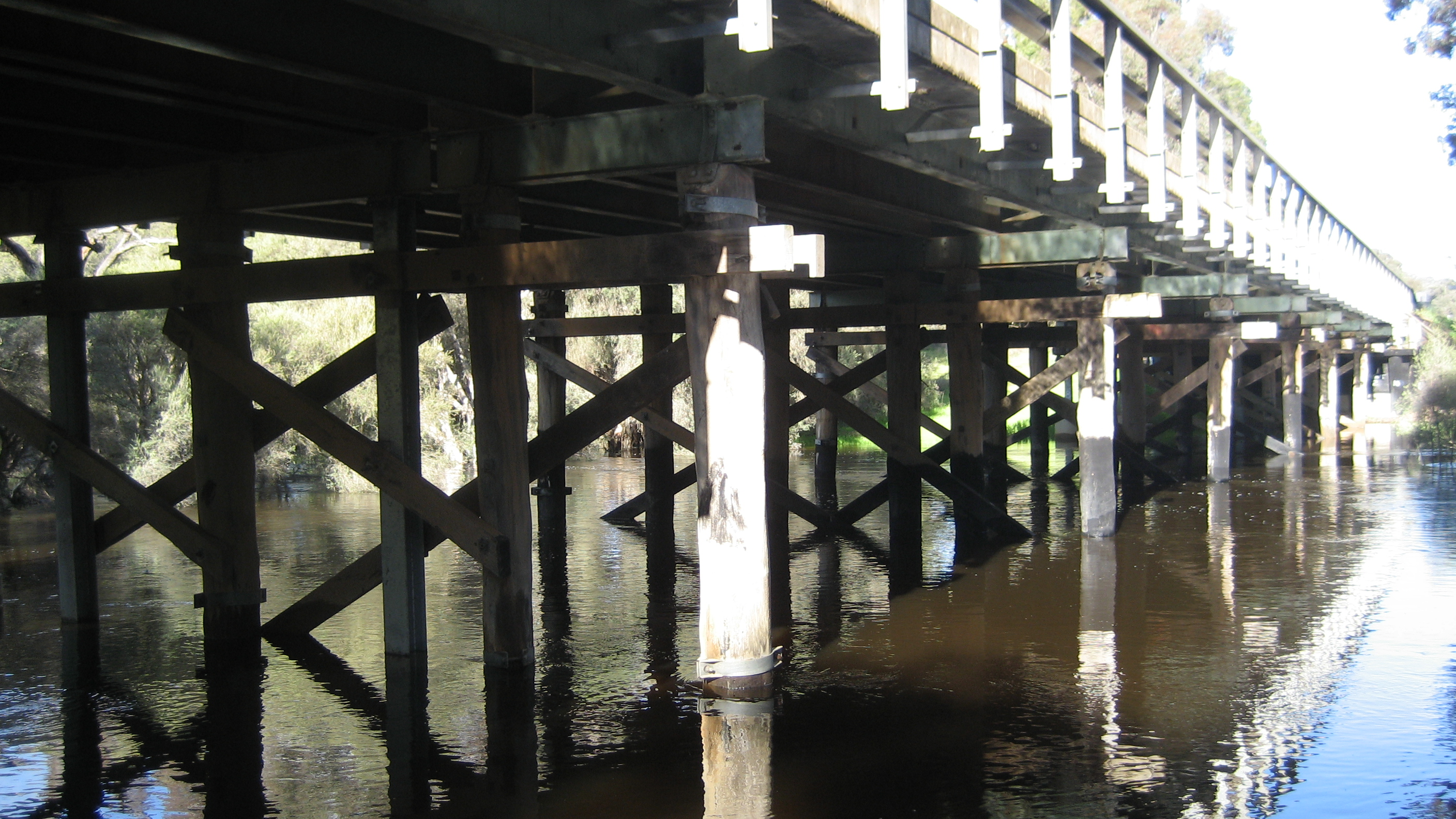
Bridge at Crossman
