= Williams, Western Australia =

Town in the Wheatbelt, Western Australia

Williams
- Town
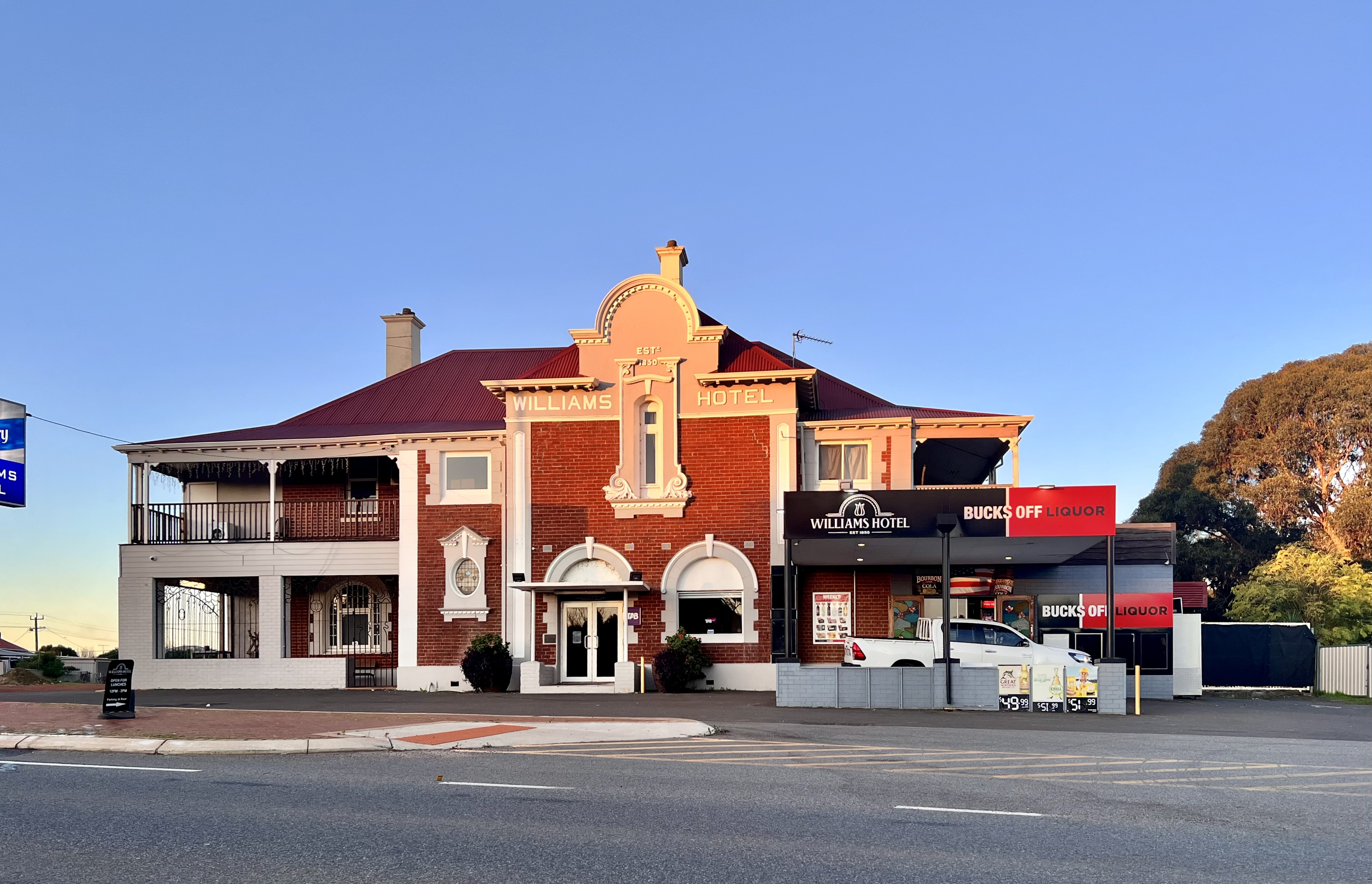
- The Williams Hotel in 2022

- Interactive map of Williams
- Coordinates: 33°02′00″S 116°53′00″E
- Country: Australia
- State: Western Australia
- LGA: Shire of Williams
- Location: 161 km (100 mi) SSE of Perth; 32 km (20 mi) W of Narrogin
- Established: 1860s

Government
  - State electorate: Roe
  - Federal division: O'Connor

Area
  - Total: 2,135.7 km^{2} (824.6 sq mi)

Population
  - Total: 424 (UCL 2021)
- Postcode: 6391
Localities around Williams
Crossman	Wandering	Cuballing
Quindanning	Williams	Highbury
Boraning	Arthur River	Arthur River

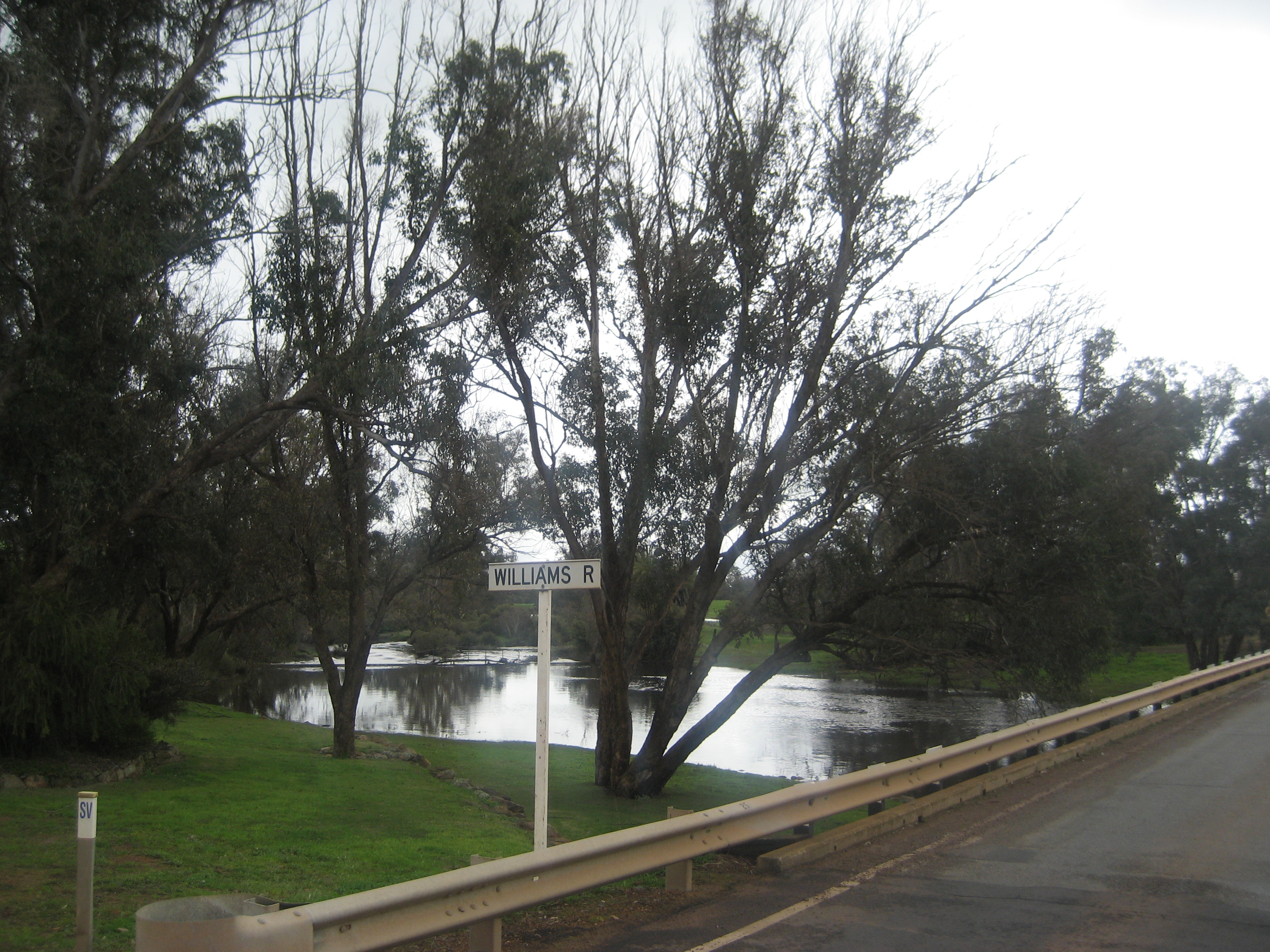
Williams River

Williams is a town in the Wheatbelt region of Western Australia, 161 kilometres (100 mi) south-southeast of the state capital, Perth along Albany Highway and 32 kilometres (20 mi) west of Narrogin. The Williams River passes through the town. At the 2016 census, Williams had a population of 411.

== History ==
Williams is named after the Williams River that flows nearby. The river was sighted by Captain Thomas Bannister in 1831 while leading the first overland expedition from the Swan River Colony to King George Sound (now Albany), and was first shown on an 1833 map. More than likely, the name honours King William IV, who reigned in the United Kingdom from June 1830 until June 1837.

The first British claims on land in the area occurred in 1832. In 1835 a party led by Governor James Stirling and John Septimus Roe surveyed a route joining King George Sound with York via Williams to encourage inland settlement. No settlement occurred until after Lieutenant Henry Bunbury explored the region in 1836, despite his assessment that "on the Williams the land is generally very bad and the water brackish".

After the building of Albany Highway by convicts in the 1850s, Williams became an important stopover point for passengers and changing of horses, and became the main centre in the district. The bridge over the Williams River was completed in 1855. The Williams Hotel was erected in 1871, and a Road Board (predecessor to the current Shire Council) first convened in 1877.

In early 1898 the population of the town was 55, 30 males and 25 females. Later the same year the local Agricultural Hall was opened by Frederick Piesse, it was built at a cost of £250 granted by Parliament.

The original town had been built on the Albany side of the river, but was subject to increasing floods due to the clearing of the land for intensive farming; therefore the town was relocated to the Perth side of the bridge. The town site was surveyed in 1905 and most of the buildings in the present town site were constructed after that time.

Williams was a stop on the Brunswick Junction to Narrogin railway line.

The Williams District Club was constructed in 1959; the foundation stone was set in December 1958. The Williams Shire offices were constructed the same year.

== Present day ==
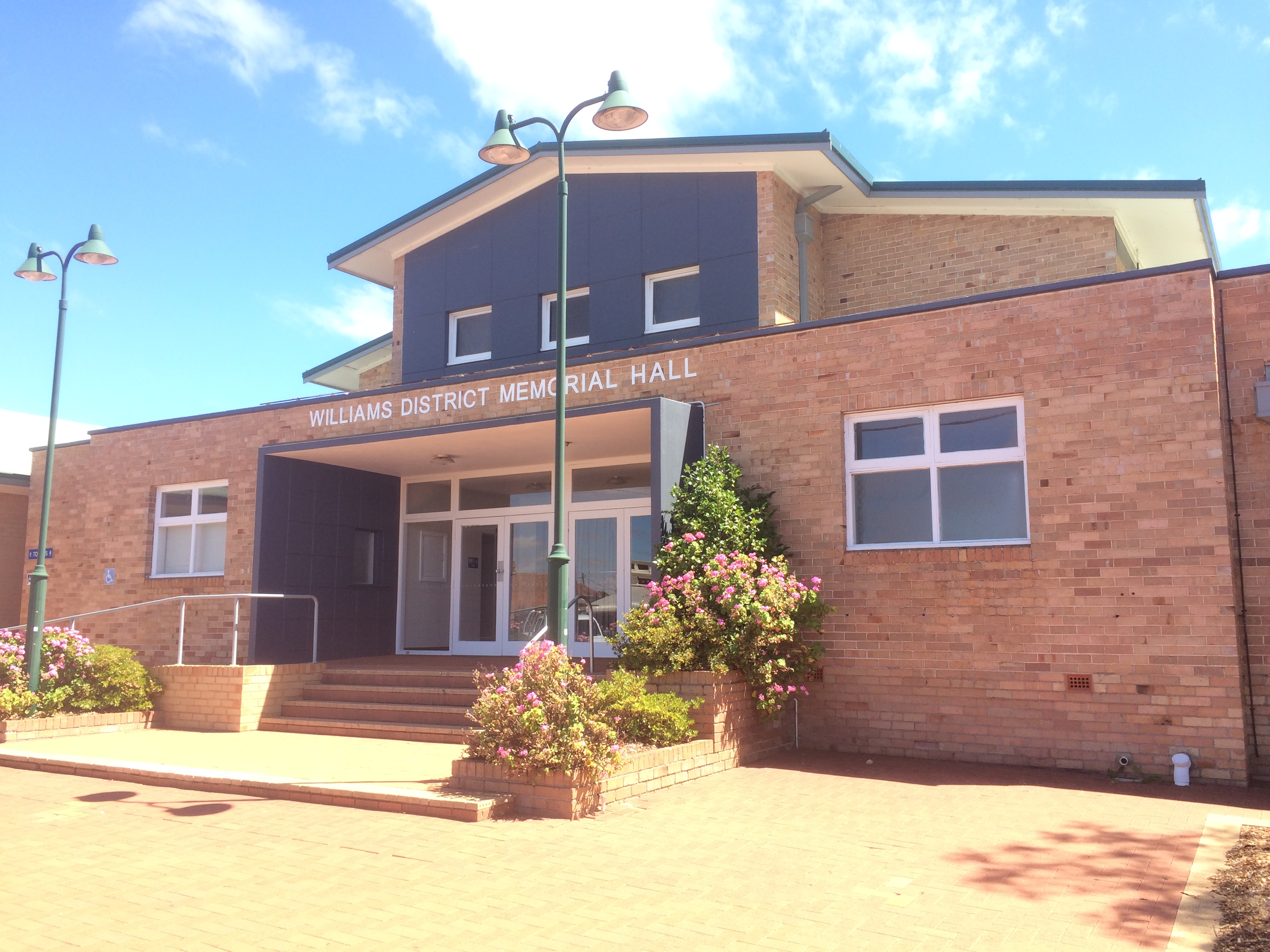
Williams District Memorial Hall in 2018

Today the town is a centre for the wool, cattle and coarse grains industry, and serves as a stopping point on Albany Highway. A heritage trail takes visitors past some of Williams's historic buildings, and nearby wildflower stands and dryandra forests are also attractions. One unusual feature is the Jesse Martin museum, a historic village and memorabilia collection constructed by a local farmer on his own property from old shops and post offices on the verge of being demolished in country towns, as well as barns full of old cars and farm machinery.

The roadhouse is a stop on the Transwa bus services to Albany (GS1) and Esperance (GE1). Williams has three service stations, one of which is open 24 hours a day.

== Climate ==
Climate data for Williams (Lat: 33.03° S Lon: 116.88° E) precipitation normals since 1885
Month	Jan	Feb	Mar	Apr	May	Jun	Jul	Aug	Sep	Oct	Nov	Dec	Year
Average precipitation mm (inches)	10.9 (0.43)	16.3 (0.64)	18.8 (0.74)	30.8 (1.21)	67.8 (2.67)	94.0 (3.70)	95.9 (3.78)	76.8 (3.02)	51.5 (2.03)	33.0 (1.30)	19.8 (0.78)	14.0 (0.55)	529.6 (20.85)
Source: Bureau of Meteorology
