= Boddington, Western Australia =

Boddington
- Town
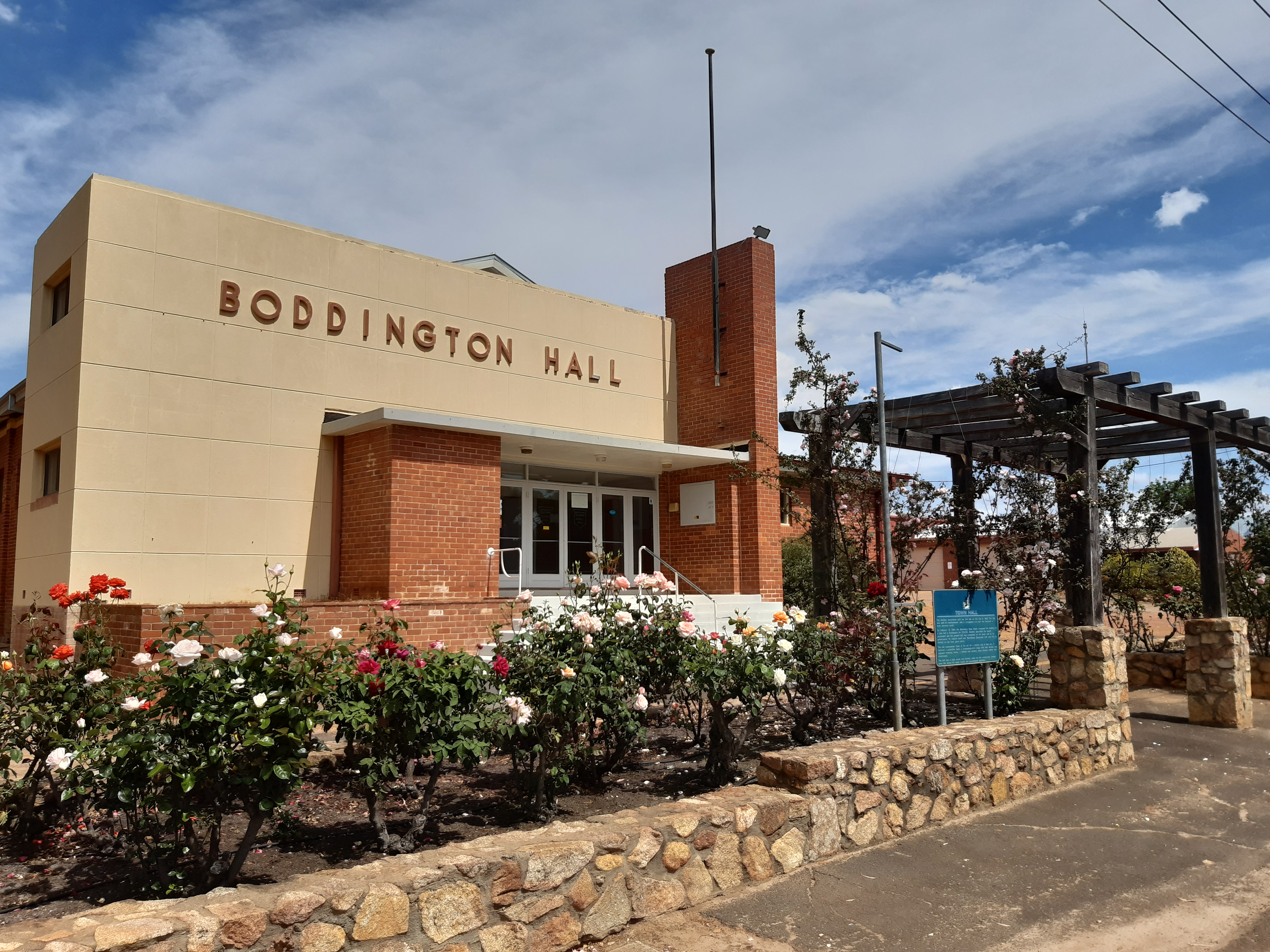
- The heritage listed Boddington Town Hall
- Interactive map of Boddington
- Coordinates: 32.802°S 116.471°E
- Country: Australia
- State: Western Australia
- LGA: Shire of Boddington
- Location: 123 km (76 mi) from Perth; 93 km (58 mi) from Mandurah

Government
  - State electorate: Central Wheatbelt
  - Federal division: O'Connor

Area
  - Total: 114.6 km^{2} (44.2 sq mi)

Population
  - Total: 1,178 (SAL 2021)
- Postcode: 6390
Localities around Boddington
Wuraming	Bannister	Ranford
Wuraming	Boddington	Crossman
Wuraming	Marradong	Marradong

Boddington is a town and shire in the Peel region of Western Australia, located 120 kilometres (75 mi) south-east of Perth. The town sits on the road from Pinjarra to Williams on the Hotham River. The population of the town was 1,844 at the 2016 Census.

== History ==
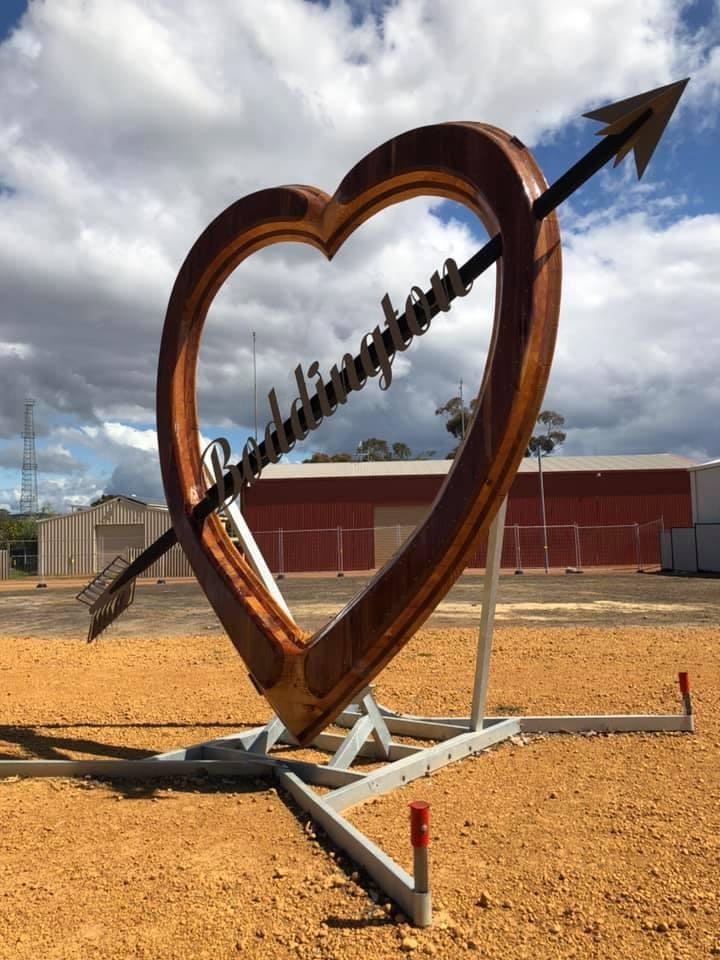
Boddington public artwork

The town owes its name to an early settler, Henry Boddington, who was a farmer and shepherd in the 1860s and 1870s and leased land in the area in 1875, later moving to Wagin. His name became associated with a pool in the Hotham River at which he frequently camped. The original settled locality was called Hotham, 2 km (1.2 mi) west of the town at what is now the end of Farmers Avenue, named for the Farmer family, and a post office and school were established.

When the Hotham Valley Railway was being constructed in 1912 to meet demand created by the local timber industry, a townsite was chosen adjacent to the town, and subsequently gazetted. The town was built in the 1920s, with a school, hospital, council offices, post office, shops and agricultural hall. A railway bridge was built over the upper reaches of the Murray River in 1949, then known as "Asquith Bridge", and was used for carting railway timber to the Banksiadale Sawmill.

The area declined slowly over time, and the 1961 Western Australian bushfires devastated the local timber industry. By 1969, the railway had been closed and Boddington became a typical small service area for the surrounding district. However, the establishment of bauxite mining in 1979 to service Western Australia's alumina production at Worsley, Kwinana and Wagerup, and the opening of the Boddington Gold Mine in 1987 created a thriving mining town.

== Present day ==
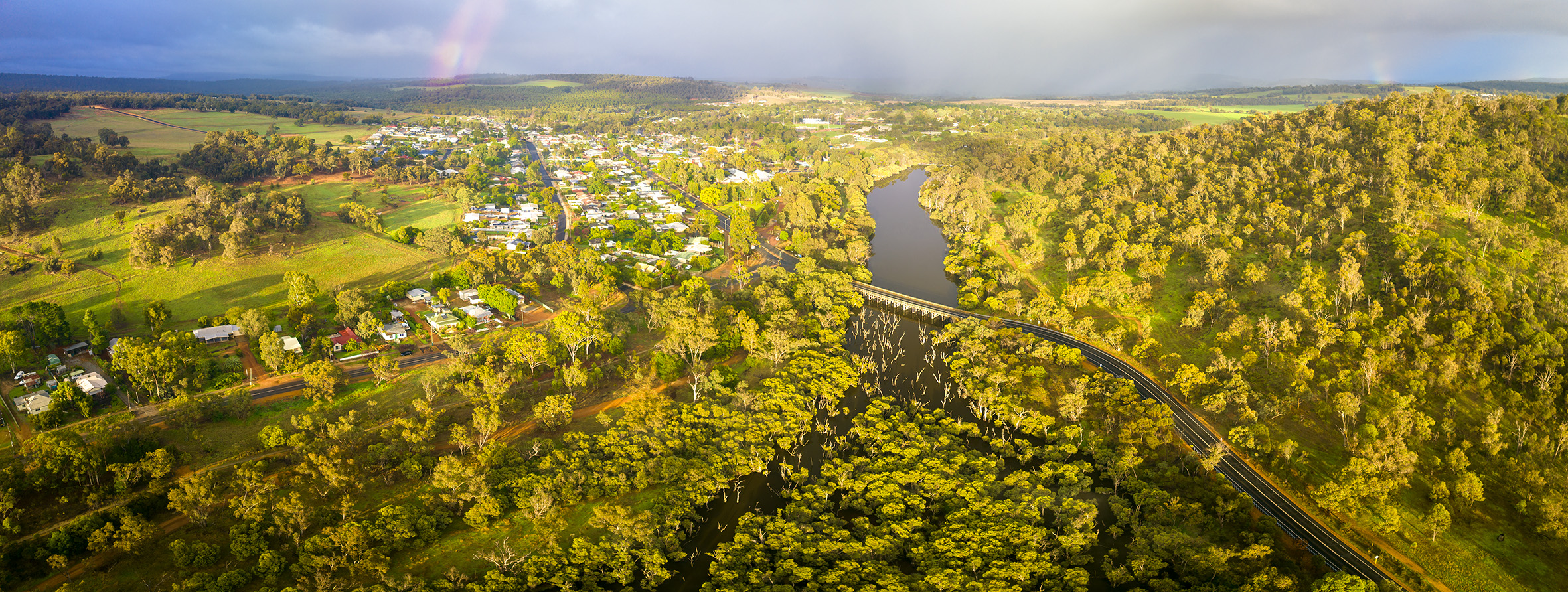
Aerial view of Boddington and the Hotham River in July 2023

Boddington is located 11 kilometres (7 mi) off Albany Highway and 123 kilometres (76 mi) southeast of Perth in the Darling Scarp. It is the centre of a sheep and timber district as well as a service centre for the nearby bauxite and gold mines. Boddington contains a TAFE centre, and each year on the first weekend of November hosts a 3-day rodeo. In addition, a district high school, shopping facilities, accommodation (hotel, motel, caravan park), council offices and a telecentre are located within the town.

== Population ==
In the 2016 Census, there were 1,198 people in Boddington. 74.1% of people were born in Australia and 87.3% of people only spoke English at home. The most common responses for religion were No Religion 40.2%, Anglican 22.1% and Catholic 13.1%.

=== District ===
A Royal Historical Society plaque near the town marks the grave of a local Aboriginal named Quency Dilyan who helped explorers Alexander Forrest and H. S. Ranford during their expeditions in the area. Several scenic drives and bushwalking tracks have been set up by the shire council through state forests and wildflower country.

== Economy ==
The town's economy is supported by mining and agriculture. The Shire of Boddington is home to the Newmont Mining owned Boddington Gold Mine and the South32 operated Boddington Bauxite Mine.

Due to its mining activities, the town is undergoing a significant growth phase. The Peel Development Commission predicts the population of Boddington will double by 2012 and up to 400 new residences will be required.

The Boddington Shire have approved several land developments ranging from larger lifestyle lots to smaller lot residential developments. Developments include Huntley Rise Estate, Forrest Hill Estate and Banksia Private Estate.

=== Accommodation ===
Boddington has self contained accommodation located in the middle of town called Boddington Retreat.
