= Lake Baandee =

- Location in Western Australia
- Interactive map of Lake Baandee
- Location: Western Australia
- Coordinates: 31°36′33″S 117°56′20″E
- Type: Salt lake
- Catchment area: 30,000 ha (74,000 acres)
- Basin countries: Australia
- Surface area: 250 ha (620 acres)

Lake Baandee, sometimes referred to as Baandee Lake or Baandee Lakes, is an ephemeral salt lake in the Wheatbelt region of Western Australia, approximately 8 km (5.0 mi) east of Doodlakine and 25 km (16 mi) east of Kellerberrin just off Great Eastern Highway. The town of Hines Hill is also located along the edge of the lake.

== Description ==
The lake is part of the Salt River system which lies within an ancient drainage zone. The landscape is primarily composed of broad, flat valley floors linked by chains of salt lakes, or playa and gently sloped valley sides containing many rocky outcrops that rises to sandplains that undulate gently. The Salt River falls within the Mount Caroline Vegetation System of the Avon Botanical District. The valley floors contain salt lakes as well as braided discontinuous channels surrounded by lunettes.

The lakes often contain no vegetation and are fringed by salt-tolerant species such as Halosarcia species of samphire, Atriplex species of saltbush and Maireana species of bluebush. These areas are followed by flats with Melaleuca uncinata thickets then into open woodlands of Eucalyptus loxophleba (York gum), Eucalyptus salmonophloia (salmon gum), Eucalyptus salubris (gimlet) and Eucalyptus longicornis (morrel).

== History ==
The traditional owners of the area are the Njakinjaki language group of the Noongar peoples. The name Baandee means "of perspiration of sweat" or "shimmer in a silvery fashion", referring to perspiration in the sun's glare or sunlight reflecting off the salt layer of the dry lake.

The lake and others in the area flooded in 1953, isolating the town of Baandee that lies to the north of the main lake.

== Facilities ==
The lake area has picnic tables and a barbeque area provided by the Inland Water Skiing Club, as well as ablutions and shower facilities built by the Shire of Kellerberrin. Swimming and skiing is possible at the lake for a few months of the year.

== See also ==
- List of lakes of Australia § Western Australia
