= Mooterdine, Western Australia =

Mooterdine
- Town
- Interactive map of Mooterdine
- Coordinates: 32.749°S 116.802°E
- Country: Australia
- State: Western Australia
- LGA: Shire of Wandering
- Location: 130 km (81 mi) SE of Perth; 31 km (19 mi) E of Boddington

Government
  - State electorate: Wagin
  - Federal division: O'Connor
- Elevation: 257 m (843 ft)

Mooterdine is a locality in the Wheatbelt region of Western Australia, east of Boddington. It is located within the Shire of Wandering.

== History ==
The locality was originally a railway station on the now closed Boddington to Narrogin section of the Pinjarra to Narrogin railway. The station was established to serve returned soldiers living on the Noombling Estate, a short distance to the north east, and takes its name from the nearby Mooterdine Pool in the Hotham River.

As constructed, the station had a goods siding on the southern side of the main line with a loading ramp situated between the two tracks. It also had stockyards, a telephone shed and a parcel facility.

Both the station and the Boddington to Narrogin line were opened on 18 September 1926 and officially closed in September 1961, although the last revenue train on the line had run on 1 May 1957. The rails through Mooterdine were lifted in May 1963.

In 2012 the CBH Group name its second CBH class locomotive, after this locality – which was a part of the older extended system of grain lines in the Wheatbelt railway lines of Western Australia.

== Sources ==
- "Map of Mooterdine, WA". Bonzle Digital Atlas of Australia]. Digital Atlas Pty Limited.
- Sallis, Roger W. (2009). The Pinjarra–Narrogin Railway: A History of Western Australia's Hotham Valley Line. Salisbury, SA: Roger W. Sallis. ISBN 9780646510224.
