= Wheatbelt railway lines of Western Australia =

Railway lines in the Wheatbelt region of Western Australia

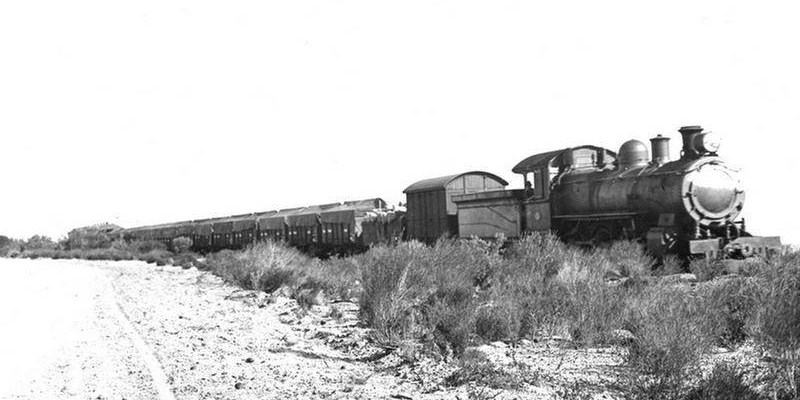
A Western Australian Government Railways E class steam locomotive hauling the first train of bulk wheat in Western Australia, 1931

The wheatbelt railway lines of Western Australia were a network of railway lines in Western Australia that primarily served the Wheatbelt region.

Maps of the Western Australian Government Railways system in the 1930s show that in the main wheatbelt region, any railway line was within 48 kilometres (30 mi) of the harvest location, facilitating ease of access to rail transport. Most of the larger extent of the network has since been closed.

In the current railway management systems, many of the remaining operating lines are primarily for the haulage of grain.

== 1900s ==
In 1905 the report of the Royal Commission into Immigration in Western Australia stated all considerable areas of agricultural land must have a 15 mile rail service.

In 1947, the Royal Commission into Railway Management noted that to construct railways in agricultural areas as cheaply as possible, lines were built with 45 lb. rail sections which practically followed the surface of the ground with earth ballasting, half-round timber sleepers and provided the bare minimum station facilities.

== 1930s ==
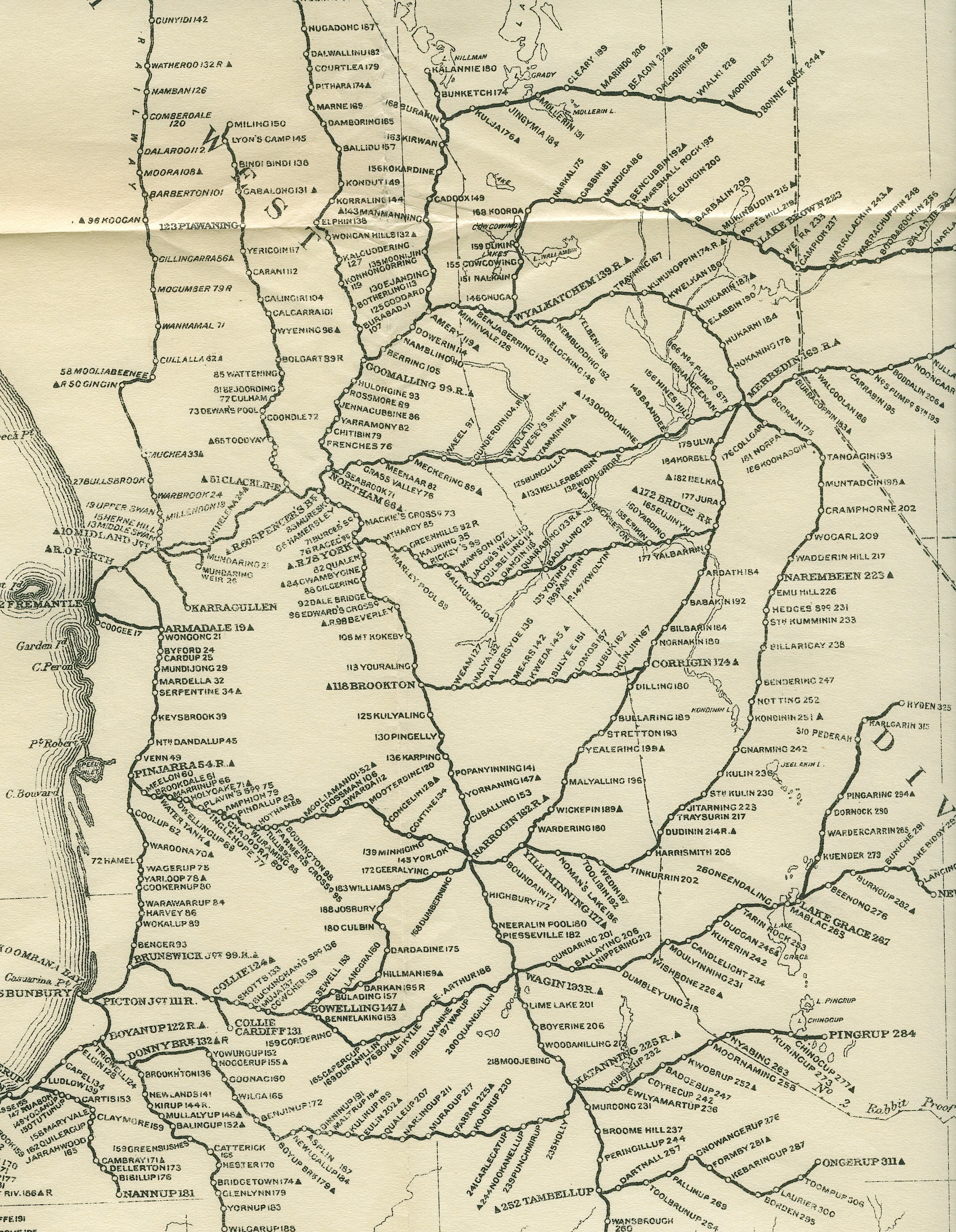
WAGR wheatbelt network in 1935. A significant number of lines shown in this map are no longer operating.

Early transport of grain was organised through the railways and growers with the Cooperative Wheat Pool of Western Australia as a main player.

The feasibility of bulk handling and storage, and the relationship with the railway networks then in place, was a concern of Wesfarmers in the 1930s, as well as that of the Western Australian government of the time.

In 1932, sidings at Benjaberring, Korrelocking, Nembudding, Trayning and Yelbeni were the first locations of bulk handling of wheat by rail:

From the time of creation of specific railway branches or sections, most railway lines in the era of the WAGR operated mixed trains carrying freight and passengers.

== 1950s ==
A number of lines of considerable length were closed in 1957 in the larger railway system.

However, not that many lines closed as a result of the 1957 decisions in the actual wheatbelt region:

- Boddington to Dwarda (1913-1957) and Dwarda to Narrogin (1926-1957)
- Brookton to Corrigin (1915-1957)
- Gnowangerup to Ongerup (1913-1957)
- Mukinbudin to Lake Brown (1923-1957) and Lake Brown to Bullfinch (1929-1957)
- Nyabing to Pingrup) (1923-1957)

Following the decline of passenger services in the 1950s, many branch lines ceased to have specific passenger services and the WAGR road bus services replaced rail passenger facilities.

== 1970s ==
In the decade of the creation of the brand Westrail, many branch lines had sidings removed, and had ceased to operate as mixed freight lines. They became in many cases oriented to single commodity lines; timber, woodchip, iron ore or grain haulage became the main orientation of many of the branch lines in the narrow gauge network.

== Agreements ==
In the 1980s a range of agreements between the rail operator and CBH were reached.

== Current network ==
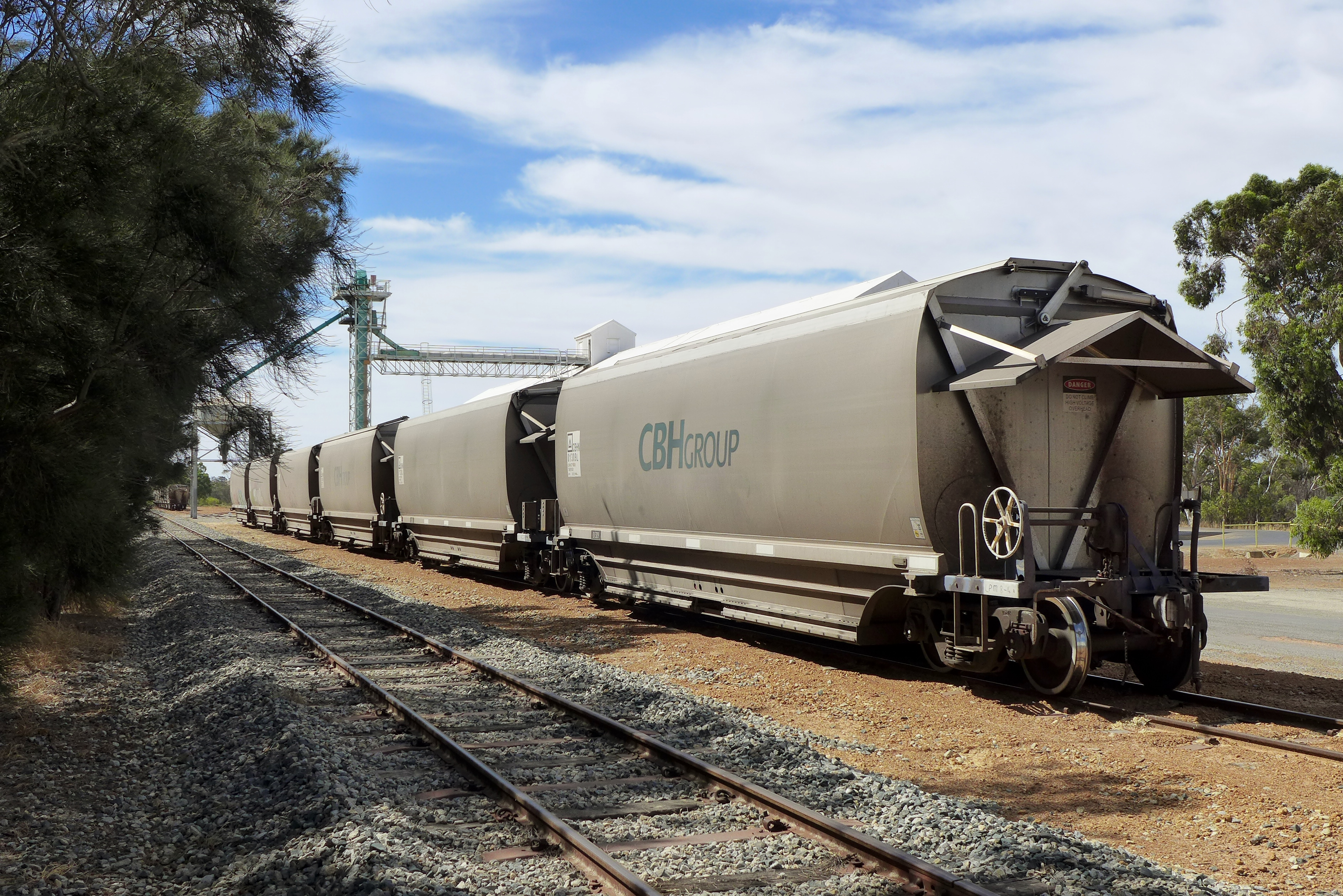
Narrow gauge CBH grain wagons at Calingiri in 2014

The current wheatbelt railway lines are linked to the extensive network of receival points that are serviced by CBH Group as part of the co-operative bulk handling business.

Historically grain had been hauled by the WAGR, Westrail and Australian Railroad Group with their own locomotives and grain wagons. In 2012, CBH purchased its own CBH class locomotives and grain wagons and contracted out the operation to Watco Australia. When re-tendered the contract was awarded to Aurizon from 2021 who continue to use the CBH owned stock.

=== Tiers ===
The Western Australian Minister for Transport, Simon O'Brien, created the Freight and Logistics Council of WA in 2009, composed of individuals involved in transport industries in Western Australia. The minister commissioned Strategic design + Development Pty Ltd, under the guidance of the Strategic Grain Network Committee (also appointed by the minister), to conduct a study into the rail network serving the wheatbelt. A report was delivered in December 2009. In the 2009 report, and the state government's response to it, the rail network has been identified as having "tiers" - the Tier 1 and Tier 2 grain haulage railway lines have been deemed to be essential to the operations of the grain freight network. The position taken by the government recommended the closing of the Tier 3 railway lines and developing the "Brookton Strategy", which involves CBH Group investing in rapid grain loading facilities at Brookton and Merredin. The Tier network is identified on the maps as the railway lines (Tier 2 and 3 as extensions beyond the main Tier 1 network) as following:

- Eastern Railway sections
  - Kwinana to Avon (Northam) (Tier 2 extends to Miling and McLevie)
  - Northam to Merredin (Tier 3 Merredin to Kondinin)
  - Northam to Kalannie (Tier 2 extends to Beacon)
  - Northam to Koorda (Tier 2 extends to Mukinbudin)
  - Merredin to Southern Cross
- Northern Railway sections
  - Kwinana to Geraldton (via Moora and Mingenew)
  - Geraldton to Mullewa
  - Mullewa to Perenjori (Tier 2 extends to Latham)
- Southern Railway sections
  - Northam to Wagin (Tier 3 to Quairading) (Tier 3 from Narrogin to Merredin) (Tier 3 from Narrogin to Kulin)
  - Wagin to Lake Grace
  - Lake Grace to Hyden
  - Lake Grace to Newdegate
  - Wagin to Albany (Tier 3 Katanning to Nyabing) (Tier 3 to Gnowangerup)

== Closures ==
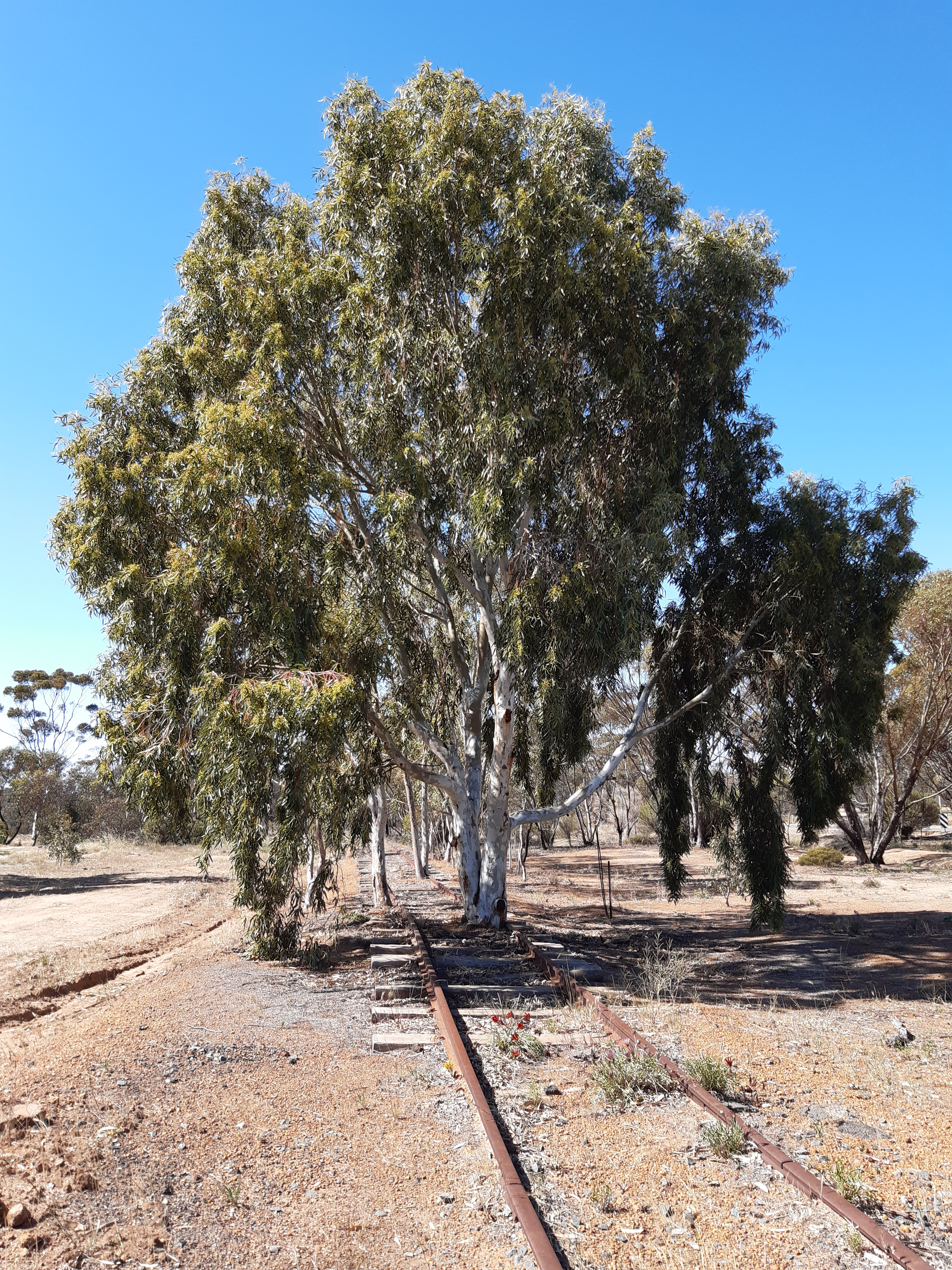
The disused railway line from Kulin to Merredin

The government decided in 2012 to close the Tier 3 lines and upgrade local and state roads.

Considerable concern was raised as to the closure proposals of the Tier 3 lines, and the expected consequent increase in road traffic.

The Wheatbelt Railway Retention Alliance and the Save Grain on Rail website continued to state the case for retention of the network.

In October 2012 the Treasurer of Western Australia, Troy Buswell, announced a delay in closure of the Tier 3 railway lines, and a move of the onus for upgrading onto the operators, and not for the government to fund or maintain.

The January 2013 report by the Western Australian Auditor General was critical of the Public Transport Authority and its management of the rail freight network lease.

In early 2013, the Western Australian state election campaign saw increased activity in relation to the issue.

The Wheatbelt Railway Retention Alliance and The West Australian reproduced the map of WA's grain rail network, outlining the context of the three tiers of the rail network.

In September 2013, Buswell repeated his lack of interest in supporting the Tier 3 network, by responding to an issue on the Quairading line.

In October 2013 Brookfield Rail announced closure of two of the Tier 3 railway lines (Merredin-Trayning and York-Quairading), with others not decided upon.

The remaining Tier 3 lines were closed in June 2014.

== Arc Infrastructure ==
In July 2017, Brookfield Rail changed its name to Arc Infrastructure.

Over three years of drawn-out mediation and arbitration was carried out between Brookfield/Arc and CBH.

Despite the time and negotiation of a rail access agreement, over 500 kilometres (310 mi) of Tier 3 railways remained closed.

== November 2019 ==
On 1 November 2019, an agreement was finalised between Arc Infrastructure and CBH, after over seven years of actions and negotiations. The agreement involved keeping the Miling railway line open, and all other Tier 3 railways closed, and allowing CBH access until 2026.
