= CBH class =

Class of Australian diesel-electric locomotives

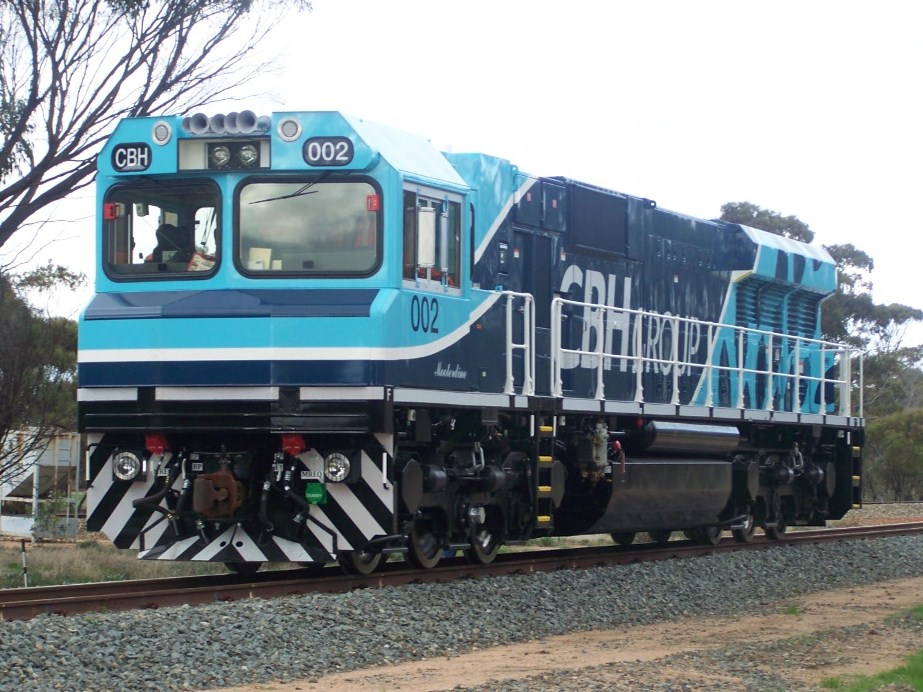
- CBH002 at Wagin in 2012
Type and origin
- Power type: Diesel-electric
- Builder: MotivePower, Boise, Idaho
- Serial number: 2363.01-2363.22, 2595-01 - 2595-03
- Model: MP27CN: CBH001–CBH012, CBH023-CBH025; MP33CN: CBH013–CBH017; MP33C: CBH118–122
- Build date: 2012-2014
- Total produced: 25
Specifications
- Configuration
  - Whyte: Co-Co
  - AAR: C-C
  - UIC: Co′Co′
- Gauge: 1,067 mm (3 ft 6 in): CBH001–CBH017, CBH023-CBH025; 1,435 mm (4 ft 8 1/2 in): CBH118–CBH122
- Bogies: 2
- Length: 18.5 metres
- Width: 2.85 metres
- Height: 4.01 metres
- Loco weight: 96 tonnes: CBH001-CBH011, CBH023-CBH025; 120 tonnes: CBH012-CBH017; 132 tonnes: CBH118-CBH122
- Fuel type: Diesel
- Prime mover: Cummins QSK60: CBH001–CBH011, CBH023-CBH025; Cummins QSK78: CBH012–CBH017, CBH118–CBH122
- Aspiration: Turbocharged
- Alternator: Kato BP 6.5
- Traction motors: GE 761: CBH001–CBH017, CBH023-CBH025; EMD D78: CBH118–CBH122
- Cylinders: V16: CBH001–CBH011, CBH023-CBH025; V18: CBH012–CBH017, CBH118–CBH122
- Train brakes: Dynamic
Performance figures
- Maximum speed: 90 km/h
Career
- Operators: Aurizon
- Number in class: 25
- Numbers: CBH001–CBH017; CBH023-CBH025; CBH118–CBH122
- Locale: Western Australia
- Delivered: Batch 1: 14 May 2012 – 31 December 2012, Batch 2: November 2014
- First run: 15 June 2012
- Current owner: CBH Group
- Disposition: 25 in service

The CBH class is a class of diesel-electric freight locomotives designed and manufactured in the United States by MotivePower in Boise, Idaho, for Western Australian grain growers' co-operative CBH Group.

The CBH class was ordered to haul grain trains on the open access rail network in the south of Western Australia. The trains, operated for CBH by Aurizon under a long-term contract, link various CBH grain collection points in the wheatbelt with CBH terminal and port facilities in Albany, Geraldton and Kwinana.

The 25 members of the CBH class are divided into three sub-classes, based on differences in power output, traction motors and track gauge.

== Background ==
In early 2010, CBH Group called tenders for the first time for the transport of grain by rail. CBH's decision to go to tender was influenced by greater competition. An aim of the tender process was the development of a new and long-term arrangement for above-rail operations that would deliver a more efficient, effective grain transport and logistics service to CBH's grower members and their customers.

Prior to releasing the tender documents, CBH carried out extensive preliminary work to identify potential rail providers around the world, and to ensure the terms of its proposed new long term partnership would provide all parties with both the flexibility and certainty to make the necessary investment.

Tenders closed in June 2010 with bids lodged by rail operators from Australia and around the world including Asciano and the incumbent Australian Railroad Group. In December 2010, CBH awarded a long-term grain rail contract to Watco WA Rail. CBH also announced that it planned to invest up to $175 million in rolling stock as part of its decision to enter into the contract.

The 10-year agreement between CBH and Watco commenced in March 2012, and involves Watco's providing a comprehensive rail logistics planning service including train planning and scheduling, tracking, maintenance, inventory control and crew management. Watco operate and maintain the 22 locomotives and 574 wagons acquired by CBH.

In April 2011, CBH contracted MotivePower to build 22 CBH class locomotives, with the first to be delivered in March 2012. According to CBH Operations General Manager, Colin Tutt, "Having new equipment with more horsepower [would] enable [CBH] to optimise train lengths and journey times, and transport more grain to port by rail."

Six companies from around the world lodged bids to manufacture the CBH class. CBH concluded that MotivePower's proposed locomotives would be the best option for the task of moving grain on Western Australian rail lines, as well as having good fuel economy. As Australia's railways have different regulations from those of the US, the CBH class locomotives would be of an entirely new design. MotivePower's contract with CBH for the supply of those locomotives was the first of what MotivePower hoped would be many international contracts.

As compensation for late delivery of the original locomotives, CBH received a further three narrow gauge locomotives in early 2015.

== Specifications ==
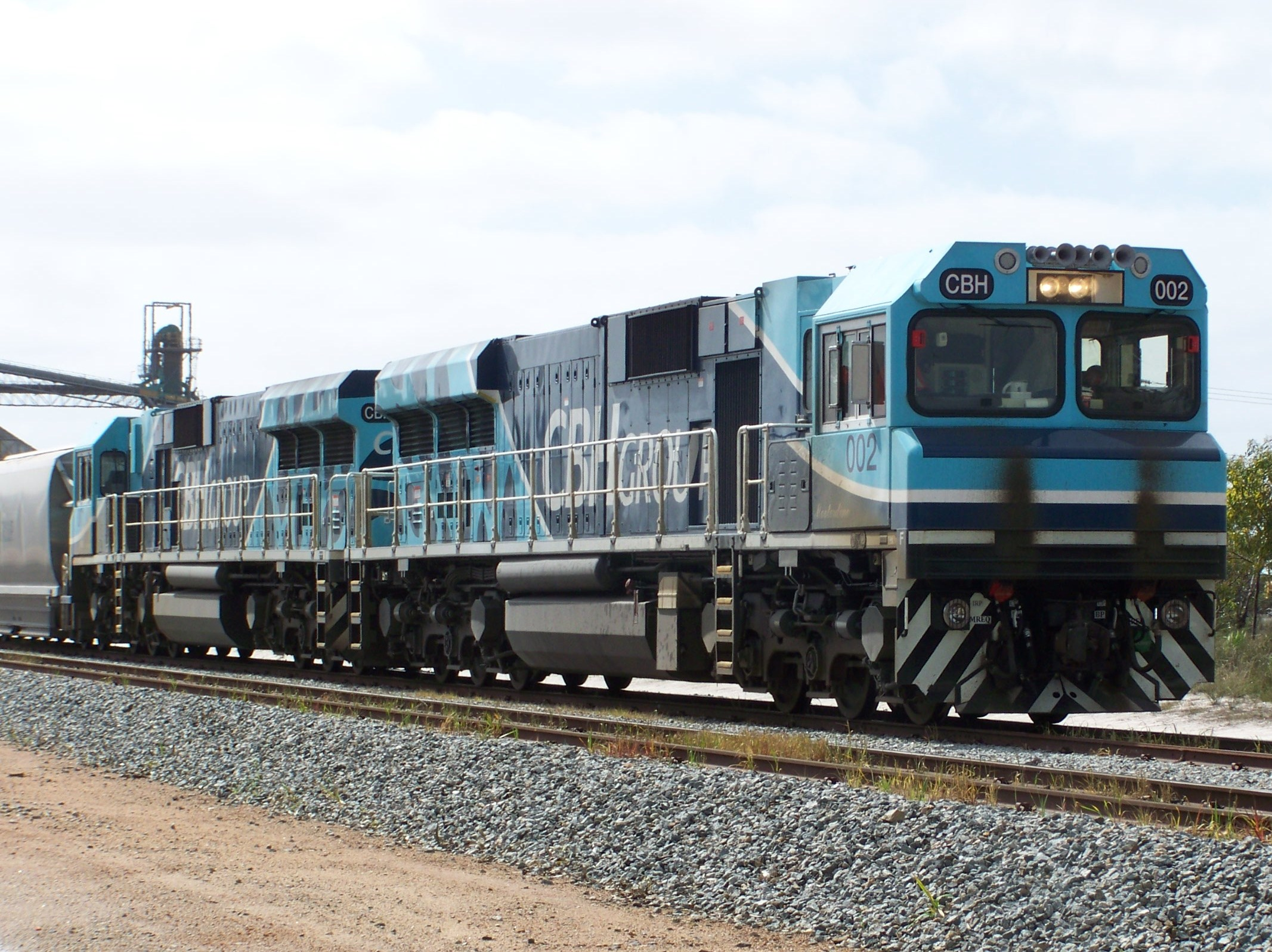
CBH002 and CBH001 at Cranbrook, 2012.

=== Common features ===
All members of the CBH class are hood unit locomotives with a single cab at one end, and ride on three axle bogies (trucks) of C-C (C'C') wheel arrangement. Each is equipped with a Cummins QSK series prime mover.

The engine blocks for the prime movers were cast in Germany and sent to the Cummins engine plant in Daventry, England, for final machining and assembly. At the end of the manufacturing process, the prime movers were hot tested before being fitted to the locomotives in Boise. The engines meet US tier three emission standards.

CBH class locomotives also have dynamic brakes and the control equipment necessary for "top and tail" distributed power operation. Trains with a CBH class locomotive at each end are easier to load and unload than a conventionally hauled train, and thus more time efficient.

=== MP27CN ===
The first eleven CBH class locomotives from batch 1 and the three locomotives from batch 2, road numbers CBH001 to CBH011 and CBH023 to CBH025, are designated as type MP27CN (27 means 2,700 hp, C means three driven axles per bogie, and N means narrow gauge). These units are equipped with a Cummins V-16 QSK60 prime mover rated at 2,000 kW (2,680 hp), and ride on 3 ft 6 in (1,067 mm) narrow gauge bogies fitted with six GE 761 traction motors.

=== MP33CN ===
The next six units in the CBH class are designated as type MP33CN, with road numbers CBH012 to CBH017. They have a more powerful Cummins V-18 QSK78 prime mover rated at 2,460 kW (3,300 hp), but are otherwise identical to the MP27CNs.

=== MP33C ===
The final five CBH class units are designated as type MP33C, and have road numbers CBH118 to CBH122. They are equipped with the same 2,460 kW (3,300 hp) Cummins V-18 QSK78 prime mover as the MP33CN, but ride on 1,435 mm (4 ft 8 1/2 in) (standard gauge) bogies fitted with EMD D78 traction motors.

== Livery and naming ==
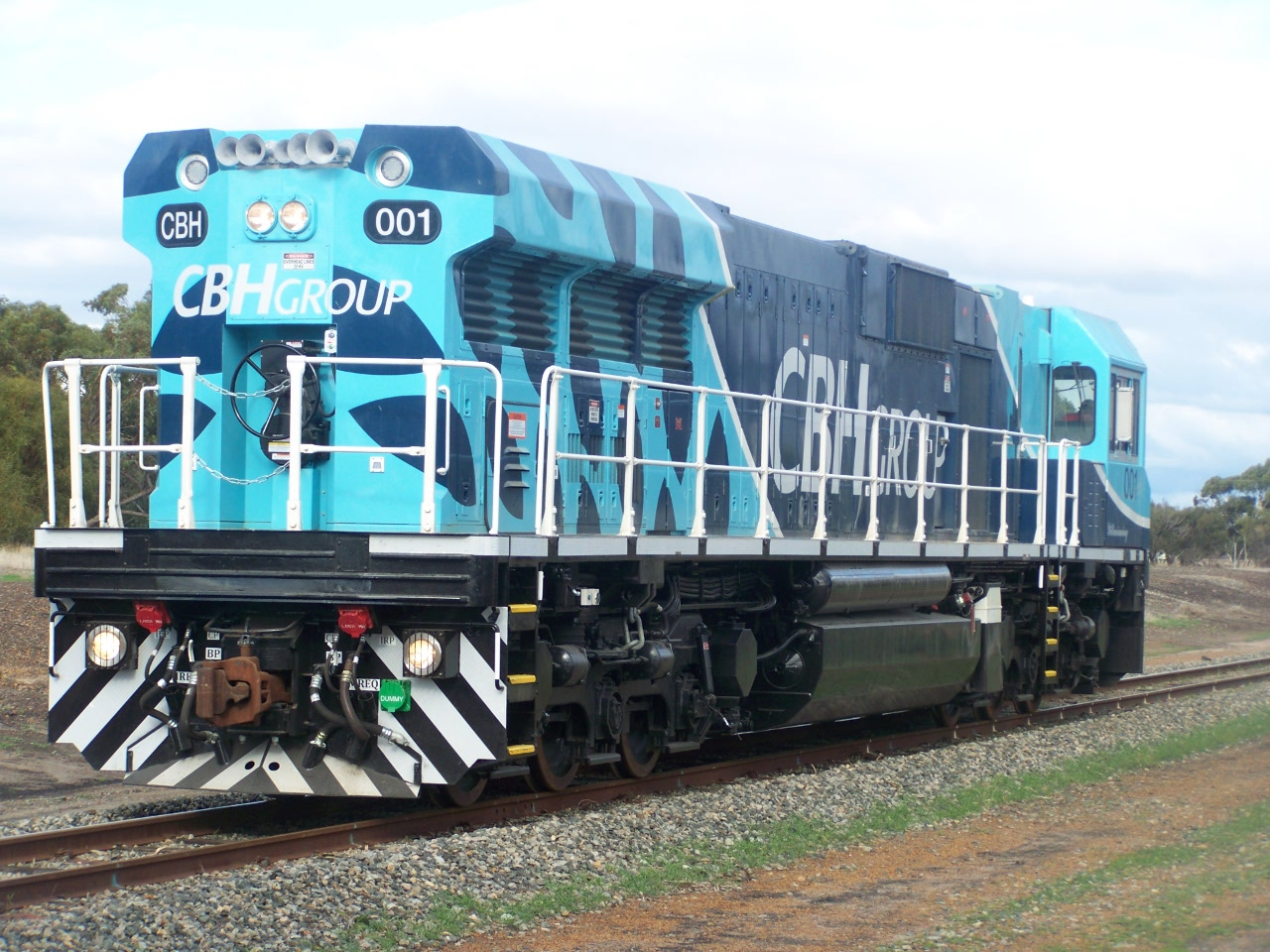
Hood end view of CBH001 Yilliminning at Wagin, 2012.

All members of the CBH class are liveried in a CBH Group two-tone mid blue / light blue design. Numbering is in mid blue, striping and lettering is in white, and the solebars and handrails are picked out in white. Underframes are painted black, with black and white safety stripes on the headstocks and access steps picked out in yellow.

In June/July 2011, CBH held a competition for grain growers to nominate "Iconic Western Australian" names for the CBH class locomotives. According to the media release announcing the competition, the locomotives would be growers' locomotives, and CBH wanted to give them the opportunity of being a part of what CBH described as an historic moment. Around 350 entries were submitted; more than CBH ever expected.

The entries covered a broad spectrum of topics, including political figures, sporting legends, CBH and the grains industry history, flora, fauna, tourist locations and indigenous culture. However, a central theme was names taken from old rail sidings from around Western Australia. The winning names were Yilliminning entered by Andrew Borthwick; Mooterdine entered by Kelvin Price; and Baandee entered by Mark Smith.

Announcing the winning names, CBH Operations General Manager, Colin Tutt, said, "We selected three grower entries and two CBH staff member entries from the submissions, the remainder of the fleet were named to fit the theme. Many of these old rail sidings are now abandoned; nevertheless they are an important part of the early rail expansion in WA."

== Service history ==
The first two members of the CBH class, CBH001 Yilliminning and CBH002 Mooterdine, entered service in mid-June 2012, shortly after arriving separately at Fremantle on their seven-week delivery journeys from the east coast of the US. Their initial task was to take a 60 wagon train to Hyden for loading.

The class was officially launched at a ceremony at the CBH Metro Grain Centre in Forrestfield on 24 August 2012. All 25 were taken over with the contract by Aurizon in September 2021.

== Class list ==
By January 2013, all of the initial order of 22 CBH class locomotives had entered service, as follows:

| Serial number | Model | Road number | Name | In service | Notes |
|---|---|---|---|---|---|
| 2363.01 | MP27CN | CBH001 | Yilliminning | 15 June 2012 | |
| 2363.02 | MP27CN | CBH002 | Mooterdine | 15 June 2012 | |
| 2363.03 | MP27CN | CBH003 | Elabbin | 25 July 2012 | |
| 2363.04 | MP27CN | CBH004 | Pantapin | 29 June 2012 | |
| 2363.05 | MP27CN | CBH005 | Kulyaling | 6 July 2012 | |
| 2363.06 | MP27CN | CBH006 | Mandiga | 20 July 2012 | |
| 2363.07 | MP27CN | CBH007 | Nanson | 6 August 2012 | |
| 2363.08 | MP27CN | CBH008 | Tenindewa | 31 July 2012 | |
| 2363.09 | MP27CN | CBH009 | Irwin | 10 August 2012 | |
| 2363.10 | MP27CN | CBH010 | Yandanooka | 15 August 2012 | |
| 2363.11 | MP27CN | CBH011 | Kokardine | 7 September 2012 | |
| 2363.12 | MP33CN | CBH012 | Piesseville | 24 September 2012 | |
| 2363.13 | MP33CN | CBH013 | Erikin | 2 October 2012 | |
| 2363.14 | MP33CN | CBH014 | Moojebing | 13 October 2012 | |
| 2363.15 | MP33CN | CBH015 | Chinocup | 13 October 2012 | |
| 2363.16 | MP33CN | CBH016 | Needaling | 5 November 2012 | |
| 2363.17 | MP33CN | CBH017 | Lake Biddy | 5 November 2012 | |
| 2363.18 | MP33C | CBH118 | Walgoolan | 6 November 2012 | |
| 2363.19 | MP33C | CBH119 | Baandee | 21 January 2013 | |
| 2363.20 | MP33C | CBH120 | Norpa | 19 November 2012 | |
| 2363.21 | MP33C | CBH121 | Benjaberring | 7 December 2012 | |
| 2363.22 | MP33C | CBH122 | Yelbeni | 21 January 2013 | |
| 2595.01 | MP27CN | CBH023 | Korrelocking | February 2015 | |
| 2595.02 | MP27CN | CBH024 | Nembudding | February 2015 | |
| 2595.03 | MP27CN | CBH025 | Trayning | March 2015 | |

== See also ==
- List of Australian diesel locomotives
- List of Western Australian locomotive classes
- Wheatbelt railway lines of Western Australia
