= Jacksonia epiphyllum =

Scientific classification
- Kingdom: Plantae
- Clade: Tracheophytes
- Clade: Angiosperms
- Clade: Eudicots
- Clade: Rosids
- Order: Fabales
- Family: Fabaceae
- Subfamily: Faboideae
- Genus: Jacksonia
- Species: J. epiphyllum

Binomial name
- Jacksonia epiphyllum Chappill

Species of legume

Jacksonia epiphyllum is a species of flowering plant in the family Fabaceae and is endemic to the south of Western Australia. It is an erect or straggling shrub, the end branches egg-shaped or elliptic phylloclades, the leaves reduced to scale leaves, the flowers yellow-orange with red markings, and woody, densely-hairy pods.

== Description ==
Jacksonia epiphyllum is an erect or straggling shrub that typically grows up to 0.4–2 m (1 ft 4 in – 6 ft 7 in) high and 0.5–1.2 m (1 ft 8 in – 3 ft 11 in) wide, its branches grey, greyish-green or gold. Its end branches are egg-shaped or elliptic phyllodes, 36–110 mm (1.4–4.3 in) long and 11–20 mm (0.43–0.79 in) wide. Its leaves are reduced to reddish brown, egg-shaped scales, 1.4–3.1 mm (0.055–0.122 in) long and 1.0–1.4 mm (0.039–0.055 in) wide, but that eventually fall off. The flowers are arranged at the base of the phylloclades, each flower on a pedicel 1.0–3.7 mm (0.039–0.146 in) long. There are egg-shaped to round bracteoles 2.2–6.9 mm (0.087–0.272 in) long and 2.4–2.5 mm (0.094–0.098 in) wide on the pedicels. The floral tube is 1.5–2.0 mm (0.059–0.079 in) long and not ribbed. The sepals are papery, the lobes 11.7–17 mm (0.46–0.67 in) long and 3.5–6 mm (0.14–0.24 in) wide and fused at the base for 1.0–1.5 mm (0.039–0.059 in). The standard petal is yellow-orange with red markings only on the inside surface, 9.3–15 mm (0.37–0.59 in) long and 8–14 mm (0.31–0.55 in) deep, the wings yellow-orange, sometimes with red markings, 9–11 mm (0.35–0.43 in) long, and the keel is yellow-orange, 7.0–8.4 mm (0.28–0.33 in) long. The stamens have green filaments 6.8–10.5 mm (0.27–0.41 in) long. Flowering occurs from October to December, and the fruit is a woody, densely hairy, broadly elliptic pod, 8.8–20 mm (0.35–0.79 in) long and 3.7–10 mm (0.15–0.39 in) wide.

== Taxonomy ==
Jacksonia elongata was first formally described in 2007 by Jennifer Anne Chappill in Australian Systematic Botany from specimens collected near Gunapin 1998. The specific epithet (epiphyllum) refers to the placement of the flowers at the base of the phylloclades.

== Distribution and habitat ==
This species of Jacksonia grows in wandoo or jarrah woodland to heath, near New Norcia, York, the Boyagin Rock, the Tutanning reserve, Popanyinning, Dryandra and Yilliminning in the Avon Wheatbelt and Jarrah Forest bioregions of southern Western Australia.

== Conservation status ==
Jacksonia epiphyllum is listed as "not threatened" by the Government of Western Australia Department of Biodiversity, Conservation and Attractions.
