= Avon Yard =

Railway yard in Western Australia

Coordinates: 31°38′34″S 116°37′59″E

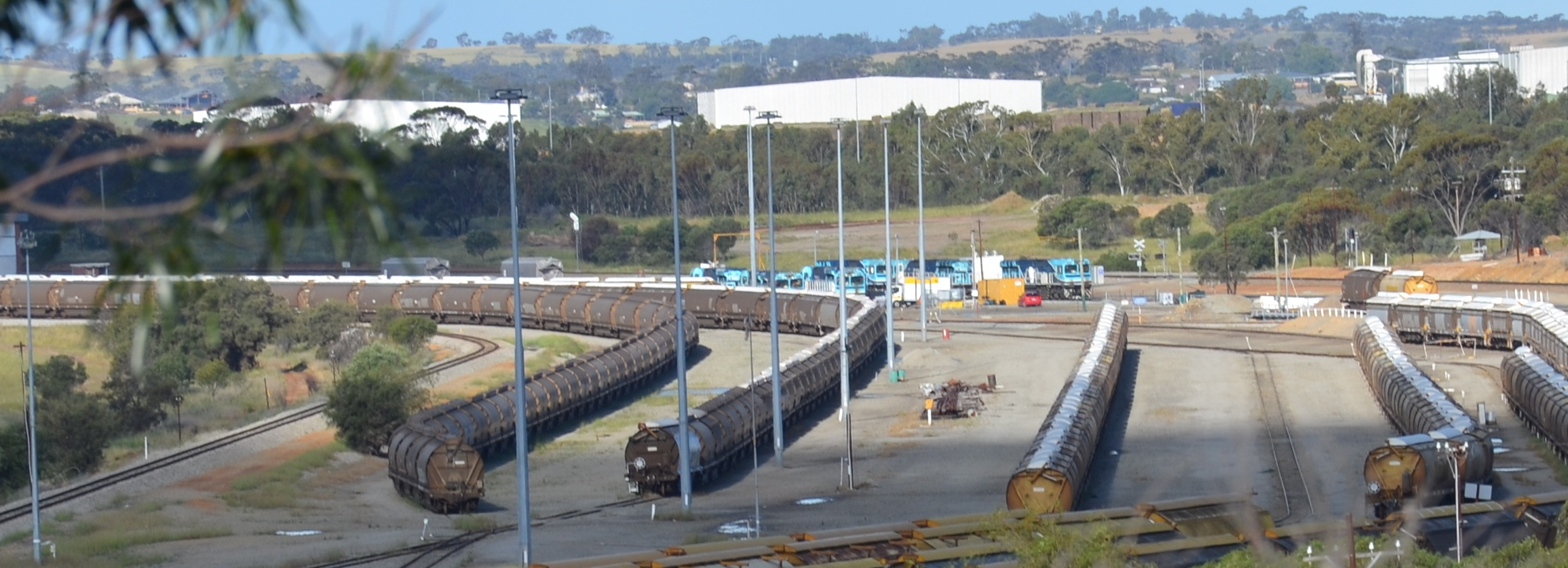
- Looking across Avon Yard from the west, October 2013

Location
- Location: Northam, Western Australia

Characteristics
- Owner: Arc Infrastructure
- Operator: Aurizon
- Type: Freight
- Roads: 22 (as built)

History
- Opened: 15 February 1966

Avon Yard is a railway yard west of Northam, Western Australia. It lies on the southern side of the Avon River on the Eastern Railway between Toodyay and Northam.

== History ==
As part of the project to gauge convert the East-West rail corridor from narrow gauge to standard gauge, a new yard was built on the Eastern Railway to the west of Northam by the Western Australian Government Railways. It was built as a dual gauge yard to allow freight from the narrow gauge Albany, Mullewa and Wyalkatchem lines to be transferred for forwarding via the standard gauge line.

Extending for 3.2 kilometres and built on 40 hectares, as built it had 22 roads, both narrow (1,067mm) and standard gauge (1,435mm). It opened on 15 February 1966, initially only for narrow gauge trains. It had a diesel locomotive servicing depot, four 45 metre lighting towers and an eight cell CBH grain silo.

In October 1968, a gantry crane assembled by Vickers Hosking in Bassendean was commissioned to transfer intermodal containers. It was last used in July 1981. In 1978 a turntable assembled at Midland Railway Workshops was installed.

The yard has been modified at various stages, as the different operators dealt with the services required. It has also been considered as redundant grain receival or storage location with some arguments for bypassing the facility and railing direct to Fremantle.

It ceased being used as an operational yard by Aurizon in May 2013, however was still used to store withdrawn rolling stock. Watco Australia used the depot to maintain its CBH class locomotives and rolling stock. As part of its new contract with CBH Group that commenced in September 2021, Aurizon reopened the yard.
