= MPI MP33C =

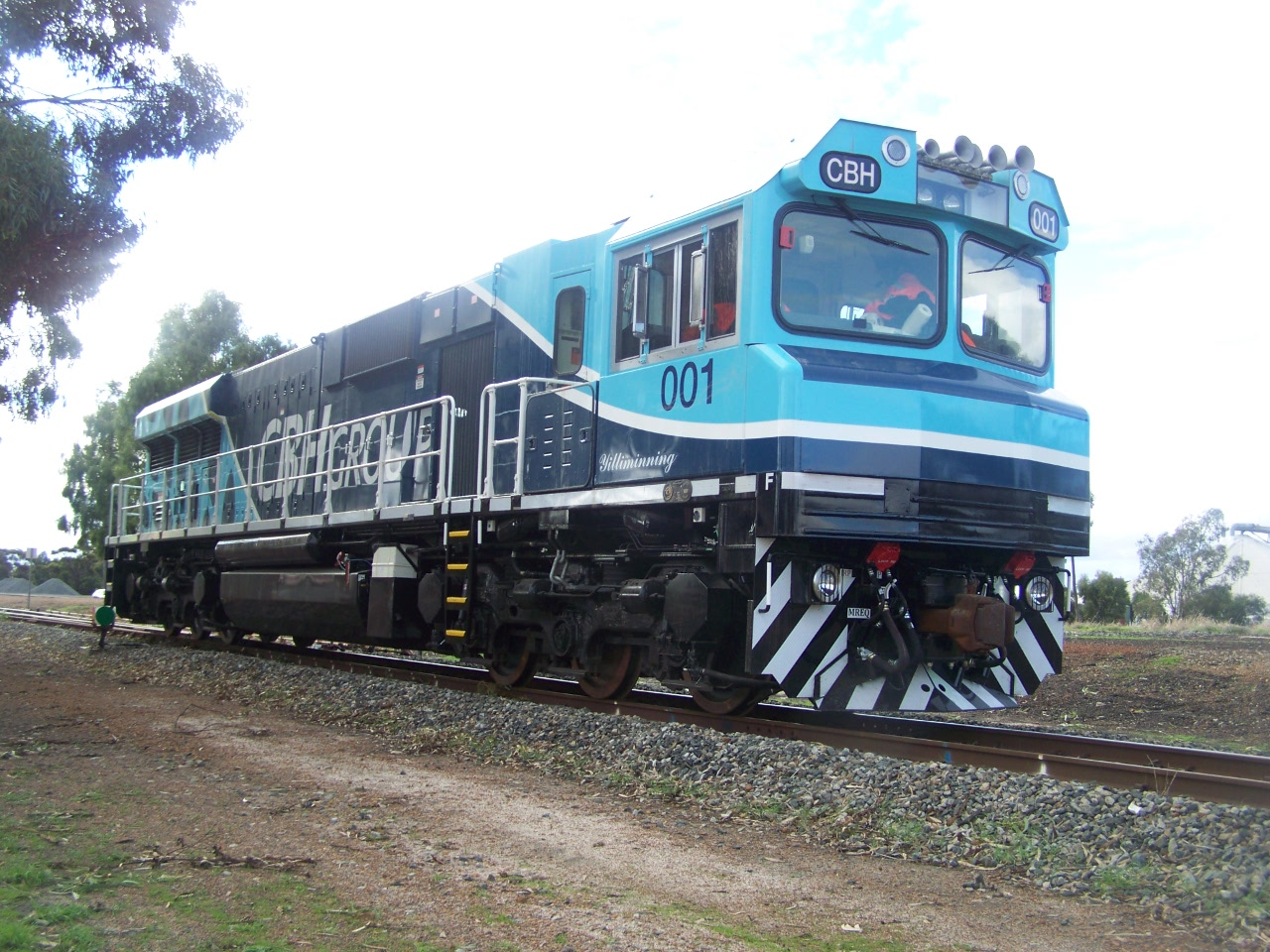
- CBH Group CBH001 at Wagin, Western Australia in 2012, this is a MP27CN narrow gauge version of the MP33C
Type and origin
- Power type: Diesel-electric
- Builder: MotivePower, Boise, Idaho
- Model: MP33C
- Build date: 2012-2015
- Total produced: 21
Specifications
- Configuration
  - AAR: C-C
  - Commonwealth: Co-Co
- Gauge: 1,435 mm (4 ft 8 1/2 in)
- Bogies: 2
- Wheel diameter: 1,016 mm (40.0 in)
- Length: 20.218 m (66 ft 4.0 in)
- Loco weight: 133.8 t (131.7 long tons; 147.5 short tons)
- Fuel type: Diesel
- Fuel capacity: 10,000 L (2,600 US gal)
- Lubricant cap.: 455 L (120 US gal)
- Coolant cap.: 802 L (212 US gal)
- Prime mover: Cummins QSK78
- Alternator: Kato RM-1665
- Traction motors: Electro Motive Diesel D87BTR
- Cylinders: V18
- Train brakes: Dynamic
Performance figures
- Maximum speed: 115 km/h (71 mph)
- Power output: 3,300 hp (2,460 kW)
- Tractive effort: 414 kN (93,000 lb_{f}) starting 363 kN (82,000 lb_{f}) continuous @ 18 km/h (11 mph)
- Factor of adh.: 28%
Career
- Operators: Various (CM); Aurizon (CBH)
- Numbers: CBH118-CBH122; CM3301-CM3316
- Locale: Australia
- Delivered: 14 May 2012
- First run: 15 June 2012
- Current owner: CBH Group; Rail First Asset Management
- Disposition: In service

The MPI MP33C is a model of diesel-electric freight locomotives designed and built by MotivePower in Boise, Idaho, USA. To date all orders have been for Australian operators.

In April 2011, five were ordered by CBH Group, in Western Australia. In May 2012, ten were ordered by Railfirst Asset Management followed by a further six in June 2013. The latter six were delivered in February 2015.

== Specifications ==
The MP33Cs are hood unit locomotives with a single cab at one end, and ride on three axle bogies of C-C (Co-Co) wheel arrangement (33 signifying 3,300 hp and C, three driven axles per bogie).

The locomotives are equipped with a Cummins V18 QSK78 prime mover rated at 3,300 hp (2,460 kW).

The engine blocks for the prime movers are cast in Germany and sent to the Cummins engine plant in Daventry, England, for the final machining and assembly process. They are then fitted to the locomotive in Boise, Idaho. All are fitted with 1,435 mm (4 ft 8 1/2 in) (standard gauge. CF locomotives are fitted with D87 traction motors. CBH Locomotives are fitted with D77/78.

== Summary ==
| Owner | Class | Units | Number in class | Numbers | Built | Notes |
|---|---|---|---|---|---|---|
| CBH Group | CBH | 5 | 5 | CBH118-CBH122 | 2011-2012 | |
| Rail First Asset Management | CM | 16 | 16 | CM3301-CM3316 | 2013-2015 | |

== See also ==
- List of Australian diesel locomotives
- List of Western Australian locomotive classes
