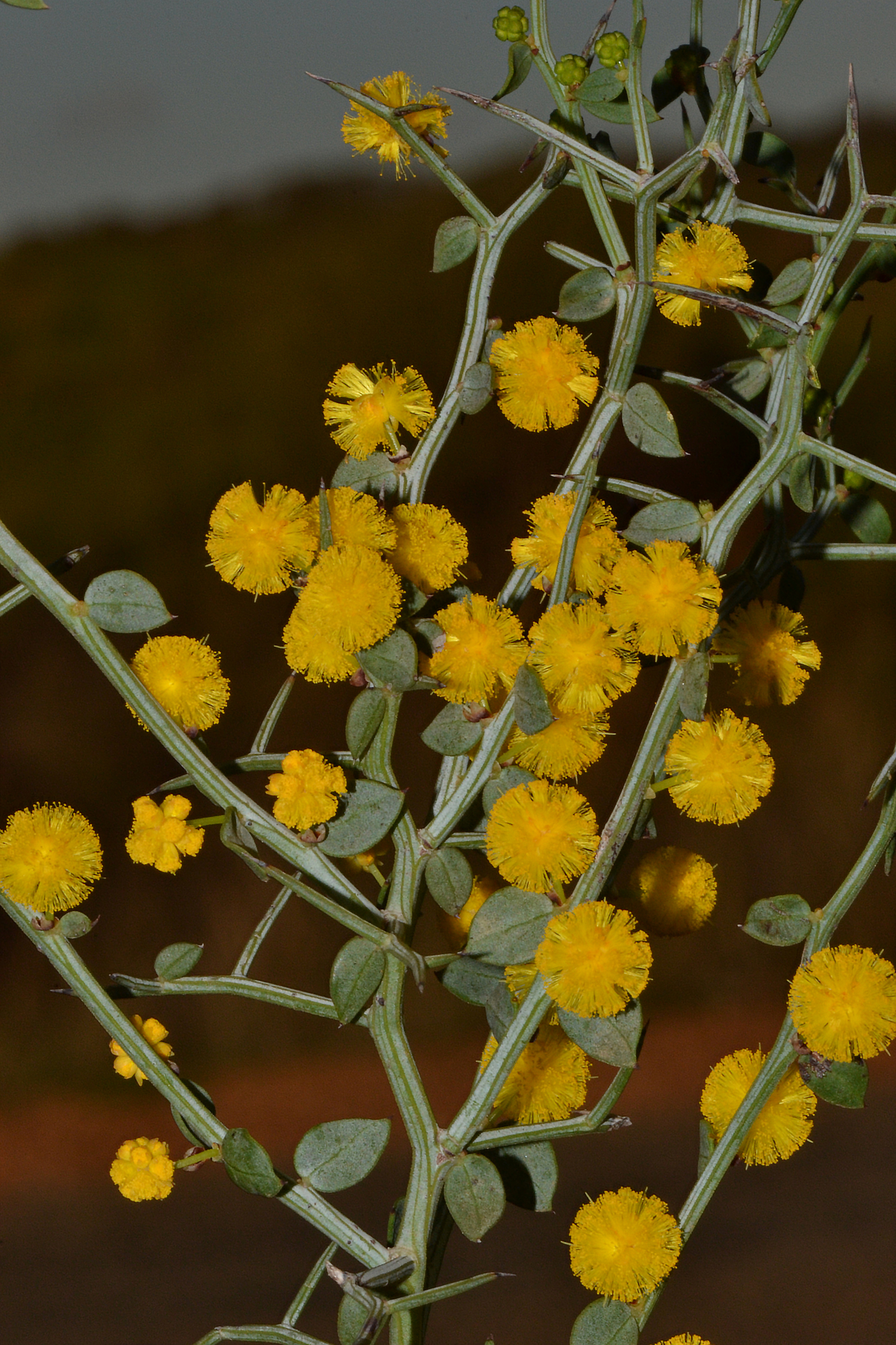

Scientific classification
- Kingdom: Plantae
- Clade: Embryophytes
- Clade: Tracheophytes
- Clade: Spermatophytes
- Clade: Angiosperms
- Clade: Eudicots
- Clade: Rosids
- Order: Fabales
- Family: Fabaceae
- Subfamily: Caesalpinioideae
- Clade: Mimosoid clade
- Genus: Acacia
- Subgenus: Acacia subg. Phyllodineae
- Species: A. jacksonioides

Binomial name
- Acacia jacksonioides Maslin
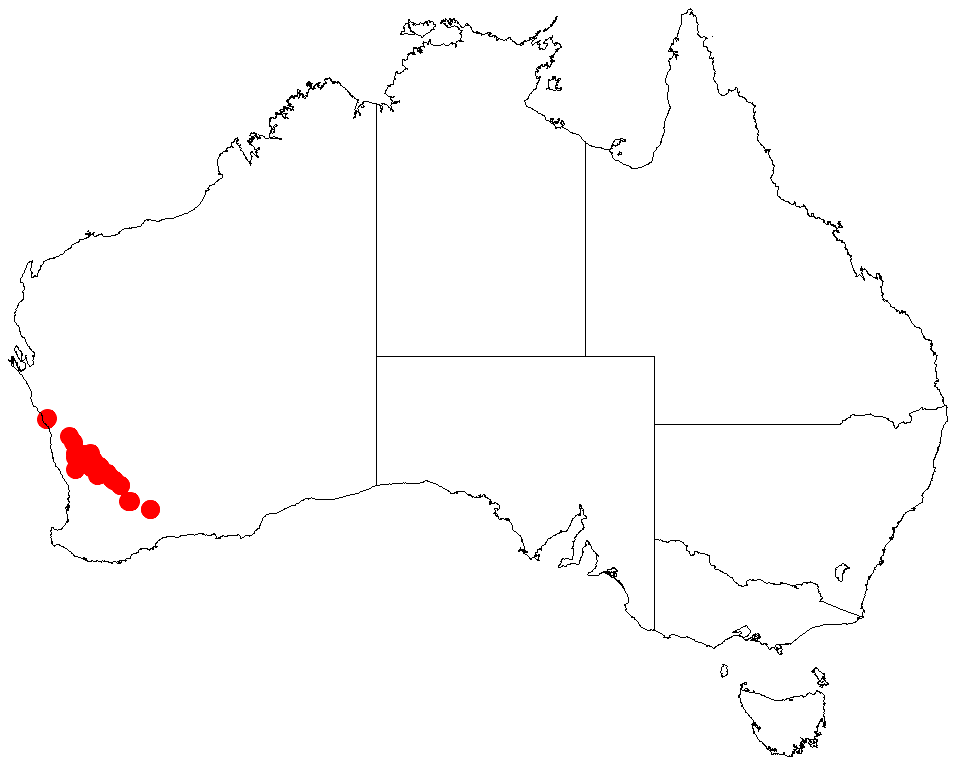
- Occurrence data from AVH

Synonyms
- Racosperma jacksonioides (Maslin) Pedley

= Acacia jacksonioides =

Species of legume

Acacia jacksonioides is a species of flowering plant in the family Fabaceae and is endemic to the south-west of Western Australia. It is an intricate, glabrous shrub with many short, spiny, leafless branchlets, egg-shaped, elliptic or oblong phyllodes, spherical heads of light golden yellow flowers and thinly leathery, bow-shaped or coiled pods raised over the seeds.

== Description ==
Acacia jacksonioides is an intricate, glabrous shrub typically grows to a height of 20–70 cm (7.9–27.6 in) and has many short, spiny, leafless, ridged branchlets that are usually covered with a white, powdery bloom. Its phyllodes are egg-shaped to narrowly egg-shaped, elliptic or almost oblong, 3.5–10 mm (0.14–0.39 in) long, 2.5–5 mm (0.098–0.197 in) wide, often wavy and more or less glaucous with a more or less prominent mid-rib. The flowers are borne in a spherical head in axils on a peduncle 3–6 mm (0.12–0.24 in) long, each head 3.5–4.5 mm (0.14–0.18 in) in diameter with 10 to 14 light golden yellow flowers. The pods are up to 40 mm (1.6 in) long and 3.0–3.5 mm (0.12–0.14 in) wide, strongly bow-shaped to openly coiled, thinly leathery and raised over the seeds alternately on each side. The seeds are oblong, 2.0–2.5 mm (0.079–0.098 in) long, shiny mottled brown with an aril on the end.

== Taxonomy ==
Acacia jacksonioides was first formally described in 1976 by Bruce Maslin from specimens he found near the Nalyaring Well, 20 km (12 mi) north of Kellerberrin towards Yelbeni in 1970. The specific epithet (jacksonioides) means 'like Jacksonia", referring to the species' branching habit.

== Distribution ==
This species of wattle grows in gravelly sand or loam, often on hilltops in scrub, shrubland or woodland from near Three Springs to south-east of Hyden, with a disjunct occurrence east of Geraldton, in the Avon Wheatbelt, Geraldton Sandplains, Mallee and Swan Coastal Plain bioregions of south-western Western Australia.

== Conservation status ==
Acacia jacksonioides is listed as 'not threatened' by the Government of Western Australia Department of Parks and Wildlife.

== See also ==
- List of Acacia species
