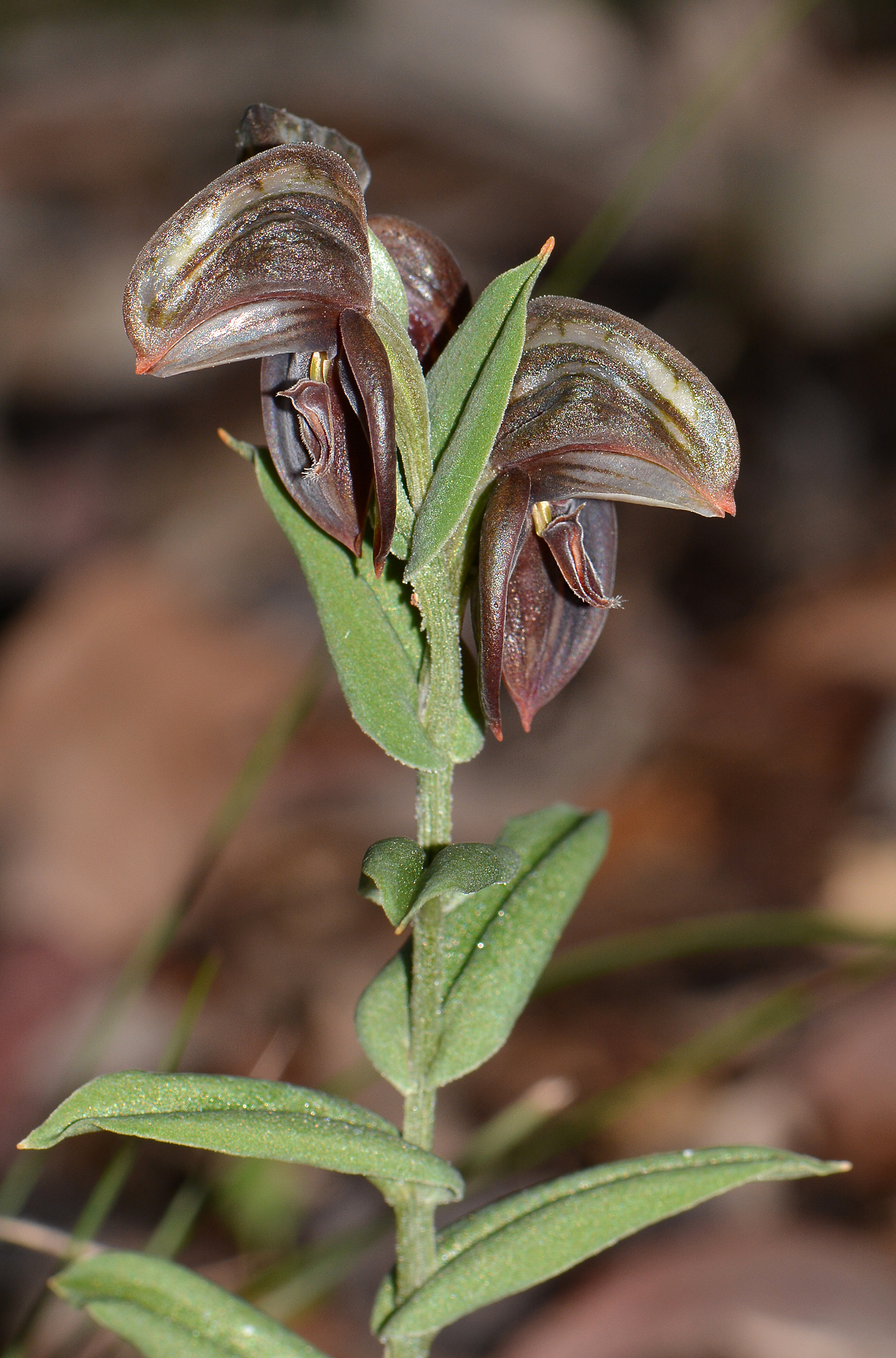
- Pterostylis concava growing near Wandering

Scientific classification
- Kingdom: Plantae
- Clade: Tracheophytes
- Clade: Angiosperms
- Clade: Monocots
- Order: Asparagales
- Family: Orchidaceae
- Subfamily: Orchidoideae
- Tribe: Cranichideae
- Genus: Pterostylis
- Species: P. concava

Binomial name
- Pterostylis concava D.L.Jones & M.A.Clem.

Synonyms
- Oligochaetochilus concavus (D.L.Jones & M.A.Clem.) Szlach.; Urochilus concavus (D.L.Jones & M.A.Clem.) D.L.Jones & M.A.Clem.

= Pterostylis concava =

Pouched greenhood

Species of orchid

Pterostylis concava, commonly known as the pouched greenhood or cupped banded greenhood, is a plant in the orchid family Orchidaceae and is endemic to the southwest of Western Australia. The plants either have a rosette of leaves in the years when not flowering or stem leaves on a flowering spike. When flowering, it has up to ten or more flowers which are dark reddish-brown, sometimes green and white with deeply cupped lateral sepals. It is an uncommon orchid, mostly found between Bindoon and Mount Barker.

== Description ==
Pterostylis concava, is a terrestrial, perennial, deciduous, herb with an underground tuber. Non-flowering plants have a rosette of between four and eight leaves, each leaf 6–30 mm (0.2–1 in) long and 5–15 mm (0.2–0.6 in) wide on a stem 10–15 mm (0.4–0.6 in) tall. When flowering, there are ten or more dark reddish-brown, green or green and white flowers borne on a flowering spike 100–450 mm (4–20 in) high. The flowering spike has between three and nine stem leaves which are 14–40 mm (0.6–2 in) long and 4–7 mm (0.2–0.3 in) wide. The flowers are 20–25 mm (0.8–1 in) long, 12–15 mm (0.5–0.6 in) wide. The dorsal sepal and petals form a hood called the "galea" over the column. The lateral sepals turn downwards, are deeply dished, 17–20 mm (0.7–0.8 in) long, 18–22 mm (0.7–0.9 in) wide and joined at their base. The labellum is dark brown, hairy and insect-like, about 7 mm (0.3 in) long, 4 mm (0.2 in) wide and flicks upwards when touched. Flowering occurs from June to early September.

== Taxonomy and naming ==
Pterostylis concava was first formally described in 1989 by David Jones and Mark Clements and the description was published in Australian Orchid Research from a specimen collected between Boyup Brook and Cranbrook. The specific epithet (concava) is a Latin word meaning "hollowed" or "arched inward" referring to the dished lateral sepals.

== Distribution and habitat ==
The pouched greenhood grows in woodland and forest, usually in moist, sheltered locations between Bindoon and Mount Barker with a disjunct population east of Esperance. It occurs in the Avon Wheatbelt, Esperance Plains, Jarrah Forest, Swan Coastal Plain and Warren biogeographic regions.

== Conservation ==
Pterostylis concava is classified as "not threatened" by the Government of Western Australia Department of Parks and Wildlife.
