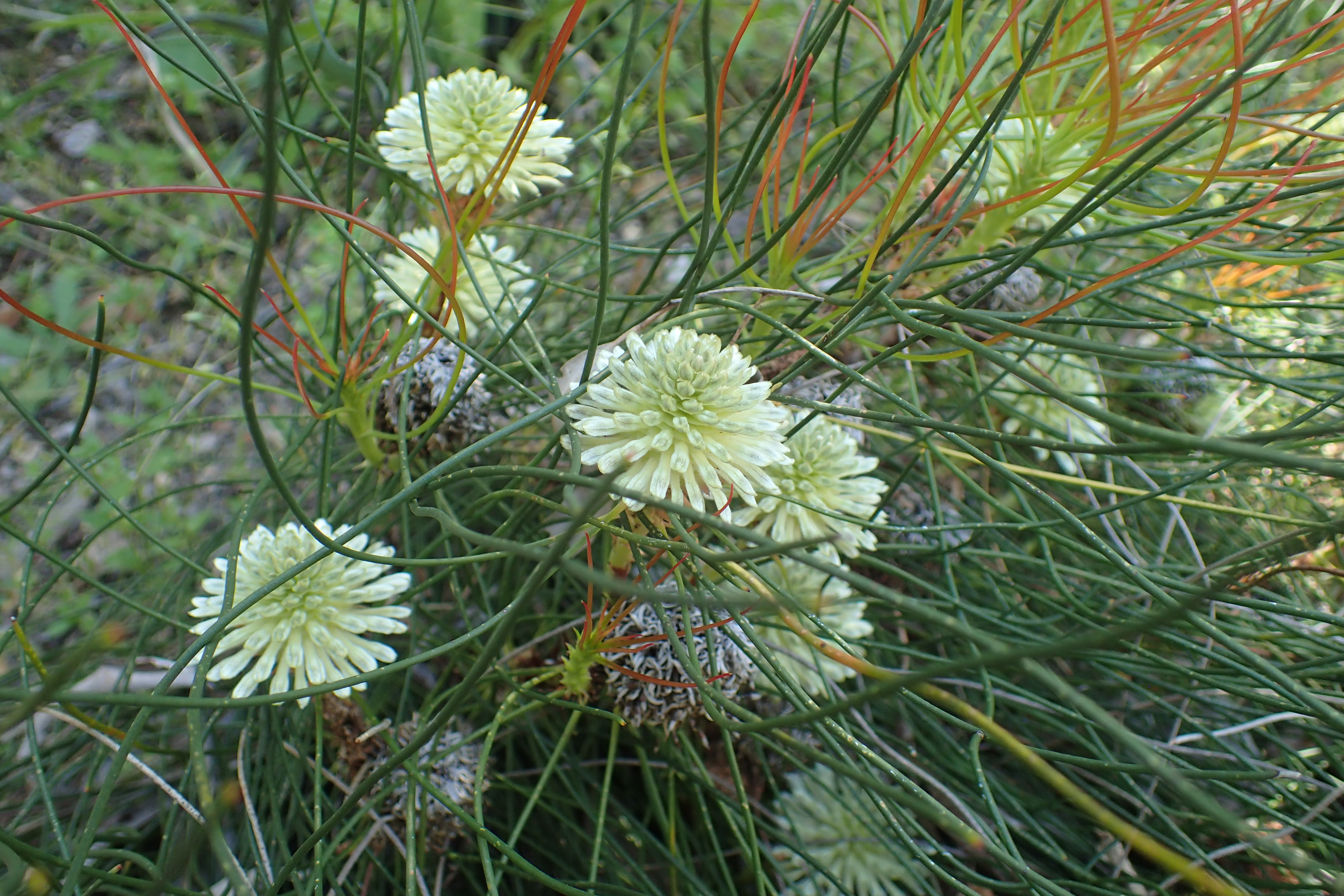
- In Kings Park, Perth

Scientific classification
- Kingdom: Plantae
- Clade: Tracheophytes
- Clade: Angiosperms
- Clade: Eudicots
- Order: Proteales
- Family: Proteaceae
- Genus: Petrophile
- Species: P. filifolia

Binomial name
- Petrophile filifolia R.Br.

Synonyms
- Petrophila filifolia R.Br. orth. var.; Protea filifolia (R.Br.) Poir.

= Petrophile filifolia =

Species of shrub endemic to Western Australia

Petrophile filifolia is a species of flowering plant in the family Proteaceae and is endemic to southwestern Western Australia. It is a small shrub with curved, long, needle-shaped leaves and more or less spherical heads of hairy cream-coloured to pale yellow flowers.

== Description ==
Petrophile filifolia is a shrub that typically grows to a height of up to 0.5 m (1 ft 8 in). Its leaves are glabrous, curved, needle-shaped, 130–280 mm (5.1–11.0 in) long and 0.9–1.5 mm (0.035–0.059 in) wide. The flowers are arranged on the ends of branchlets in sessile, more or less spherical heads with a few narrow egg-shaped involucral bracts at the base. The flowers are about 17–25 mm (0.67–0.98 in) long, densely hairy and cream-coloured to pale yellow. Flowering mainly occurs from October to January and the fruit is a nut, fused with others in an oval head 15–28 mm (0.59–1.10 in) long and 14–20 mm (0.55–0.79 in) wide.

== Taxonomy ==
Petrophile filifolia was first formally described in 1810 by Robert Brown in the Transactions of the Linnean Society of London. The specific epithet (filifolia) means "thread-leaved".

In 2005, Barbara Lynette Rye and Michael C. Hislop described two subspecies in the journal Nuytsia and the names are accepted by the Australian Plant Census:

- Petrophile filifolia R.Br. subsp. filifolia;
- Petrophile filifolia subsp. laxa Rye & Hislop that differs from the autonym in having flowers with longer hairs on the pollen presenter.

== Distribution and habitat ==
This petrophile grows in a variety of habitats between Armadale, the Perup River, the Stirling Range and Albany in the Jarrah Forest biogeographical region of southwestern Western Australia. Subspecies laxa grows in woodland and heath in the Armadale-Wandering area.

== Conservation status ==
Petrophile filifolia is classified as "not threatened" but subsp. laxa is classified as "Priority Three" by the Government of Western Australia Department of Parks and Wildlife meaning that it is poorly known and known from only a few locations but is not under imminent threat.
