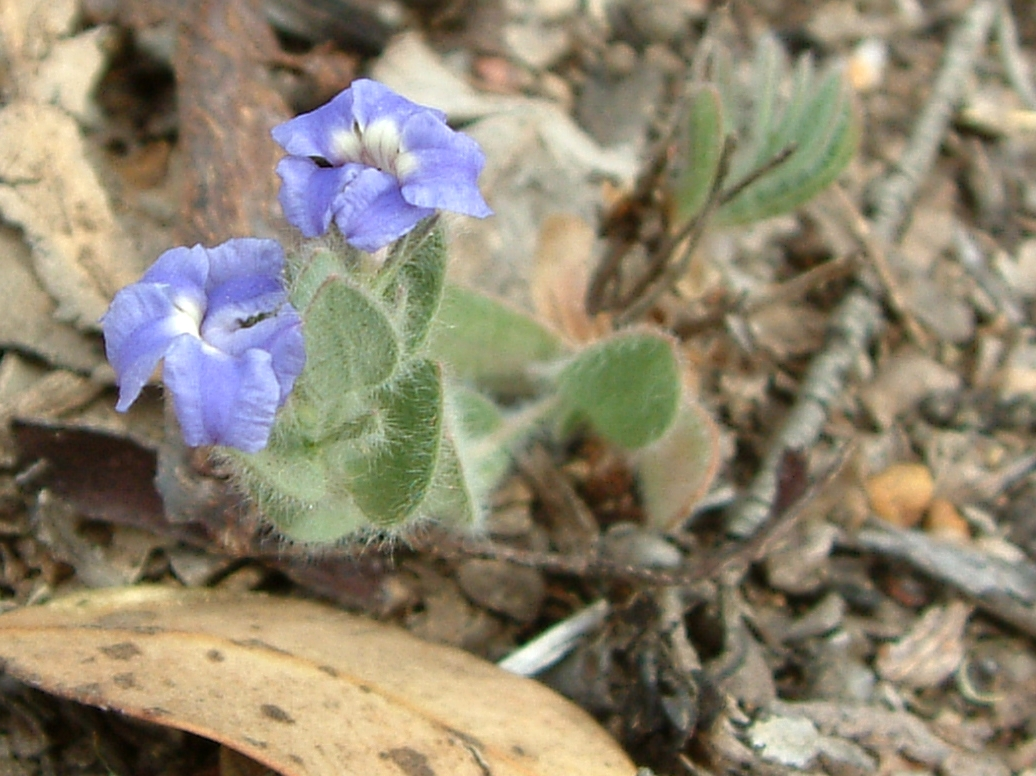

Conservation status
- Priority Three — Poorly Known Taxa (DEC)

Scientific classification
- Kingdom: Plantae
- Clade: Tracheophytes
- Clade: Angiosperms
- Clade: Eudicots
- Clade: Asterids
- Order: Asterales
- Family: Goodeniaceae
- Genus: Goodenia
- Species: G. katabudjar

Binomial name
- Goodenia katabudjar Cranfield & L.W.Sage

= Goodenia katabudjar =

Species of plant

Goodenia katabudjar is a species of flowering plant in the family Goodeniaceae and is endemic to a restricted area in the south-west of Western Australia. It is a hairy perennial sub-shrub with egg-shaped stem-leaves and blue, pink or white flowers.

== Description ==
Goodenia katabudjar is a hairy perennial sub-shrub that typically grows to a height of 10–20 cm (3.9–7.9 in). The leaves are arranged along the stem and are egg-shaped, 7–26 mm (0.28–1.02 in) long and 2–11 mm (0.079–0.433 in) wide. The flowers are usually blue to pink sometimes white, 12–16 mm (0.47–0.63 in) long and 8–14 mm (0.31–0.55 in) wide. The sepals are linear, 5.5–7 mm (0.22–0.28 in) long and 0.5–0.75 mm (0.020–0.030 in) wide and the corolla has wings 1.5–2 mm (0.059–0.079 in) wide. Flowering occurs in December and the fruit is a more or less spherical capsule about 3 mm (0.12 in) in diameter.

== Taxonomy and naming ==
Goodenia katabudjar was first formally described in 1997 by Raymond Jeffrey Cranfield and Leigh William Sage in the journal Nuytsia from specimens collected by Sage near Wandering in 1996. The specific epithet (katabudjar) is derived from Noongar words meaning "hill" and "ground", referring to the habit of this species and its hillside habitat.

== Distribution and habitat ==
This goodenia grows in upland areas of open wandoo woodland in the Jarrah Forest biogeographic region of south-western Western Australia.

== Conservation status ==
Goodenia katabudjar is classified as "Priority Three" by the Government of Western Australia Department of Parks and Wildlife meaning that it is poorly known and known from only a few locations but is not under imminent threat.
