= Yilliminning, Western Australia =

Town in southwestern Australia

Yilliminning
- Town
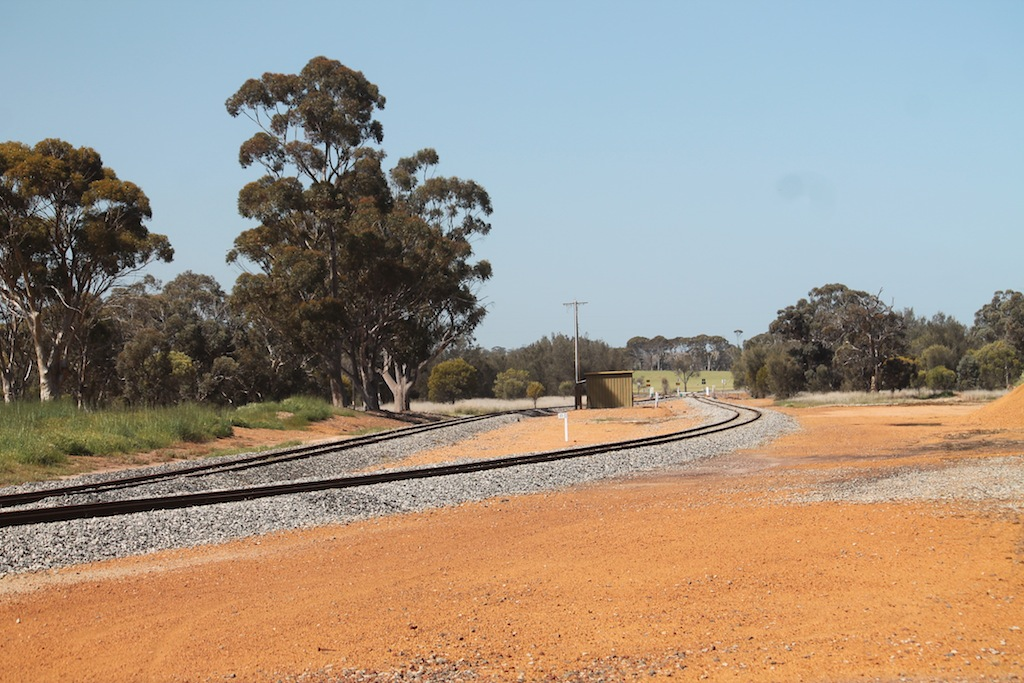
- Yilliminning station yard, 2013

- Coordinates: 32°54′00″S 117°22′00″E
- Country: Australia
- State: Western Australia
- LGA(s): Shire of Narrogin
- Location: 212 km (132 mi) SE of Perth; 20 km (12 mi) ENE of Narrogin
- Established: 1907

Government
  - State electorate(s): Roe
  - Federal division(s): O'Connor

Area
  - Total: 186.8 km^{2} (72.1 sq mi)

Population
  - Total(s): 47 (SAL 2021)
- Postcode: 6312

Yilliminning is a small town located in the southern Wheatbelt region of Western Australia, 212 kilometres (132 mi) southeast of the state capital, Perth and 23 kilometres (14 mi) east of Narrogin. At the 2006 census, Yilliminning had a population of 337.

== History ==
The name Yilliminning is of Aboriginal origin, derived from a rock, pool and river of the same name nearby, and was first recorded in 1892. It originally had one "n", but was amended in 1944 after years of confusion about the spelling.

In 1906, the Minister for Lands visited the area, and local settlers sought his support for the declaration of a townsite. Land was set aside, a hall was erected, and lots were surveyed. The townsite of Yillimining was gazetted in July 1907, but no lots were sold due to doubts about the future of the townsite because it wasn't on the route of a proposed new railway between Narrogin (on the Great Southern Railway) and Wickepin to the northeast.

In 1909 the government constructed the new railway line west of the townsite, and established Yillimining Siding 5 kilometres west of the townsite. Demand for a new townsite to be declared arose, and the new townsite (called Yillimining) was gazetted in 1910, with the old one being cancelled. The Yillimining station was junction for the two rail way lines, the Merredin to Narrogin railway via Corrigin, and the Merredin to Narrogin via Kondinin.

In 2012 CBH Group named its first grain haulage CBH class locomotive after the location.

== See also ==
- Wheatbelt railway lines of Western Australia
