= Gleneagle, Western Australia =

Gleneagle
- Town
- Interactive map of Gleneagle
- Coordinates: 32°17′17″S 116°11′31″E
- Country: Australia
- State: Western Australia
- LGA: Shire of Wandering

Gleneagle or Glen Eagle is a locality in Western Australia. The locality is south east of the state capital, Perth, close to Jarrahdale on the Albany Highway.

It now remains as a rest stop for drivers.

The townsite functioned as a settlement for forest workers and their families.

The locality was seriously affected by the bushfires in summer of 1960/61, the Jarrahdale fires. Fire burned the town of Dwellingup and the smaller settlements of Holyoak, Nanga Brook and Karridale. There were many injuries but no deaths and serious losses of pasture, stock and fencing. A Royal Commission was held in the wake of these fires.

The settlement operated its own school between 1939 and 1967. The school closed due to declining enrolments as the district of Wandering became the larger service centre. Located on the Albany Highway a plaque commemorates the location. Remnants of the townsite including roads and central water tower remain, but the houses have been removed by the government agency upon closure.

The name is also shared with a significant mining company in Western Australia but the locality and company have no direct correlation.
