= Hines Hill, Western Australia =

Hines Hill
- Town
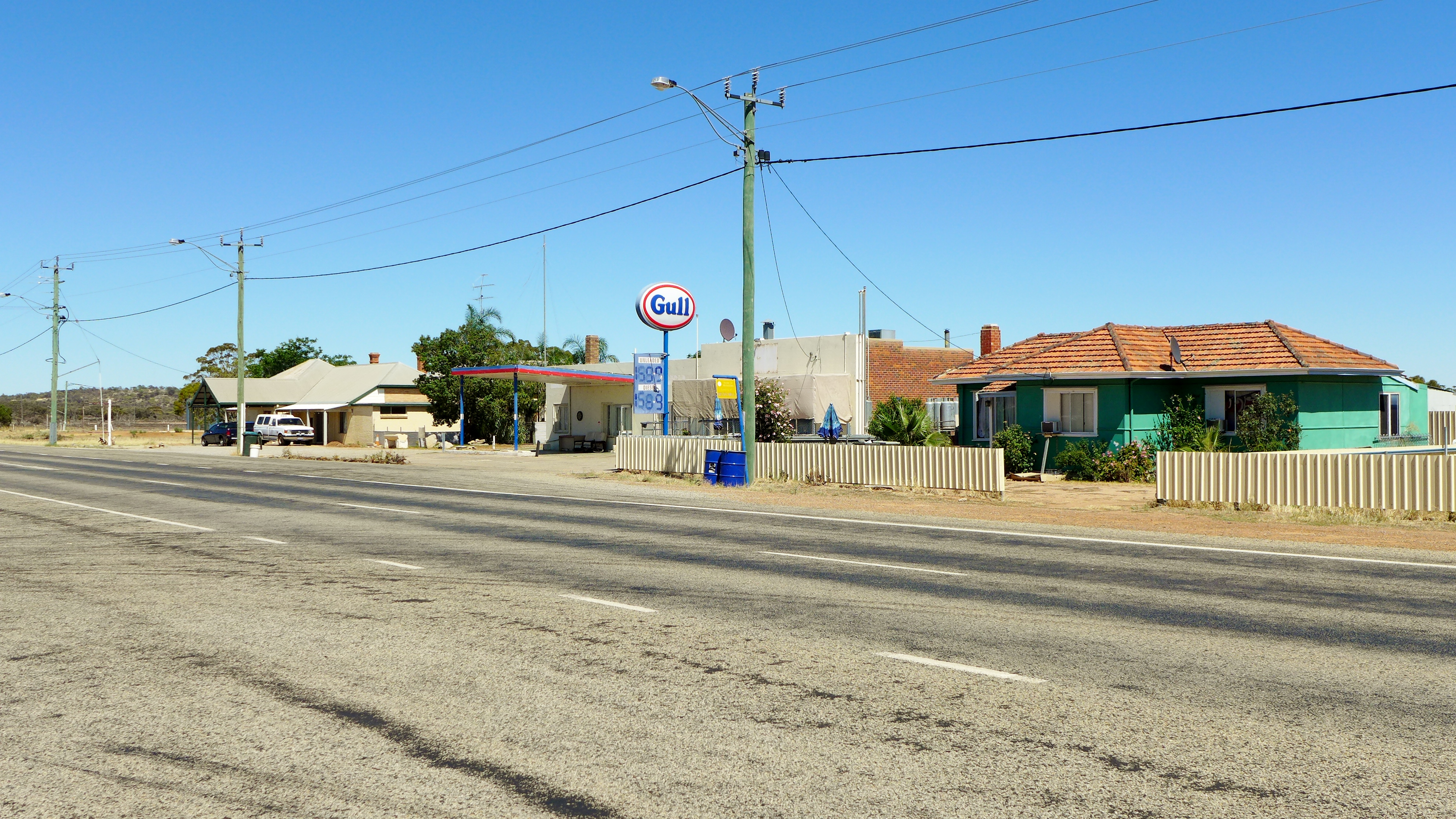
- Great Eastern Highway, Hines Hill, 2014

- Interactive map of Hines Hill
- Coordinates: 31.54°S 118.08°E
- Country: Australia
- State: Western Australia
- LGA: Shire of Merredin
- Location: 240 km (150 mi) east of Perth; 20 km (12 mi) west of Merredin; 35 km (22 mi) east of Kellerberrin
- Established: 1910

Government
  - State electorate: Central Wheatbelt
  - Federal division: Durack

Area
  - Total: 237.8 km^{2} (91.8 sq mi)
- Elevation: 255 m (837 ft)

Population
  - Total: 59 (SAL 2021)
- Postcode: 6413

Hines Hill is a town located 240 km (150 mi) east of Perth, between the towns of Merredin and Doodlakine in Western Australia. The town is situated on the Great Eastern Highway and also on the edge of Lake Baandee. The town has one of the first privately owned weighbridges in Western Australia is located close to the town.

== Geography ==
It serves as a stop on the MerredinLink and Prospector rural train services. The railway line from Northam to Southern Cross was built through the locality in 1894 and the section was opened for traffic in 1895. The townsite was named after the original siding and the town was gazetted in 1910.

Hines Hill is a nearby geographical feature; it is thought to have been named after Jack Hines, a sandalwood collector who worked in the area.

== Economy ==
The surrounding areas produce wheat and other cereal crops. The town is a receival site for Cooperative Bulk Handling.

== Rail services ==
Transwa's AvonLink and Prospector services stop at Hines Hill, at least one service each day.

== See also ==
- Hines Hill train collision
