= Baandee, Western Australia =

Baandee
- Town
- Coordinates: 31.581°S 117.978°E
- Country: Australia
- State: Western Australia
- LGA(s): Shire of Kellerberrin
- Location: 229 km (142 mi) ENE of Perth; 30 km (19 mi) W of Merredin

Government
  - State electorate(s): Central Wheatbelt
  - Federal division(s): Durack

Area
  - Total: 146.3 km^{2} (56.5 sq mi)
- Elevation: 249 m (817 ft)

Population
  - Total(s): 12 (SAL 2021)
- Postcode: 6412

Baandee is a small town located in the Wheatbelt region of Western Australia, about halfway between the towns of Kellerberrin and Merredin on the Great Eastern Highway, approximately 230 kilometres (143 mi) from Perth, the state capital.

== History ==
The town was gazetted in April 1912. There is some debate as to the Aboriginal meaning of the name, although one settler noted that the Aboriginal name for Hines Hill, 8 kilometres (5 mi) to the east, is "Baandui".

In 1932, the Wheat Pool of Western Australia announced that the town would have two wheat elevators on two new wheat bins, each fitted with an engine, installed at the railway siding. The installation of at least one elevator was completed early the following year.
