= Shire of Wandering =

Local government area in the Wheatbelt region of Western Australia

Coordinates: 32°40′55″S 116°40′41″E

- Local government area
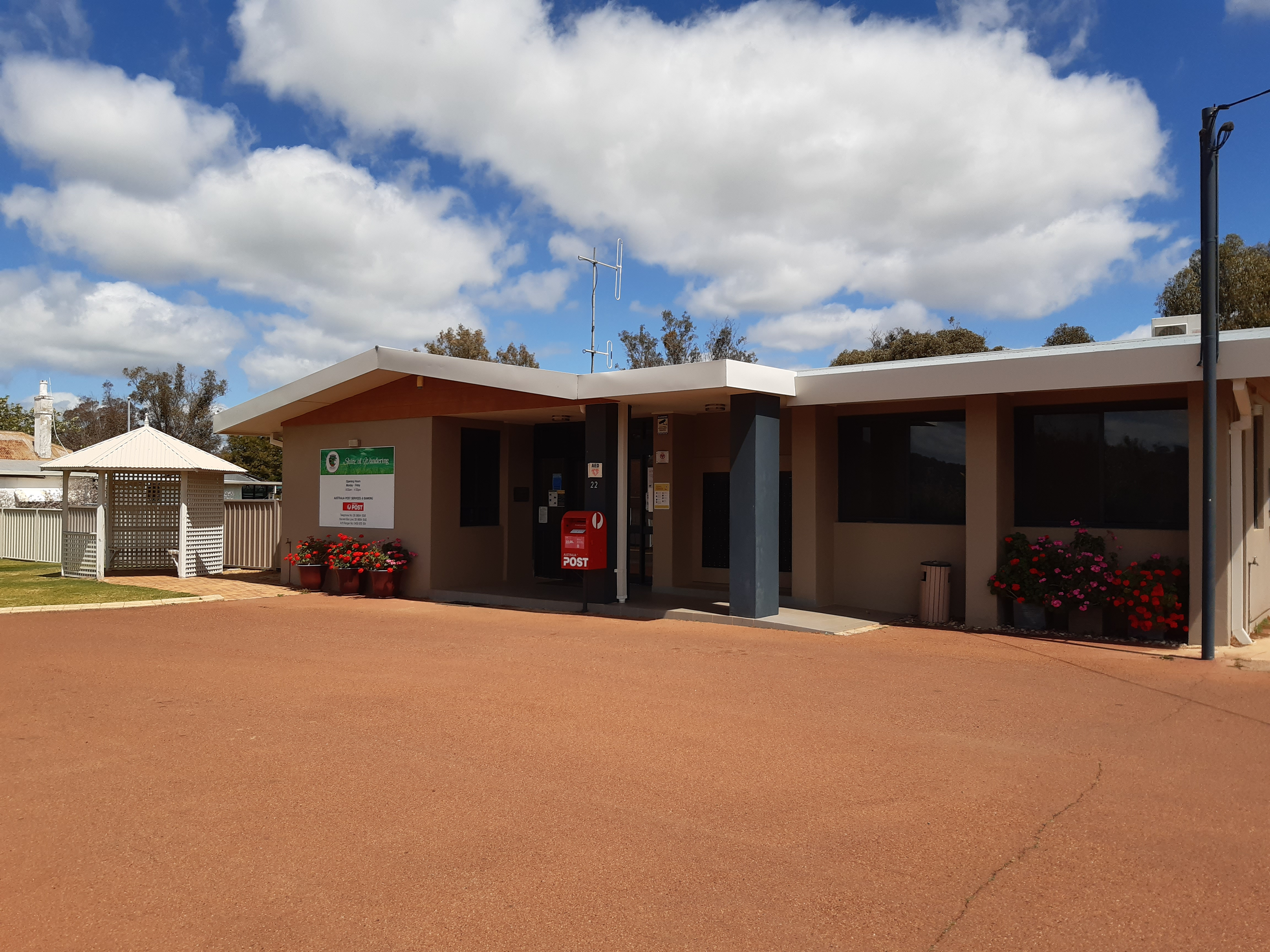
- The Wandering Shire offices

- Interactive map of Shire of Wandering
- Country: Australia
- State: Western Australia
- Region: Wheatbelt
- Council seat: Wandering

Government
  - Shire President: Sheryl ‘Little
  - State electorate: Central Wheatbelt
  - Federal division: O'Connor

Area
  - Total: 1,900.8 km^{2} (733.9 sq mi)

Population
  - Total: 535 (LGA 2021)
- Website: Shire of Wandering
LGAs around Shire of Wandering
Serpentine- Jarrahdale	Beverley	Brookton
Boddington	Shire of Wandering	Pingelly
Boddington	Williams	Cuballing

The Shire of Wandering is a local government area in the Wheatbelt region of Western Australia, and, with a population of 444 as at the 2016 census, is one of the nation's smallest. It covers an area of 1,901 square kilometres (734 sq mi) generally to the east of Albany Highway about 120 kilometres (75 mi) south-east of Perth, the state capital. The Shire's seat of government is the town of Wandering.

== History ==
The Wandering Road District was gazetted on 6 October 1874 out of land previously part of the Williams Road District.

On 1 July 1961, it became a shire following the enactment of the Local Government Act 1960, which reformed all remaining road districts into shires.

== Wards ==
The Shire is undivided and is represented by seven councillors.

From 1941 until the 2009 elections, it was divided into four wards as follows:

- North Ward (two councillors)
- North East Ward (two councillors)
- South Ward (two councillors)
- Town Ward (one councillor)

== Towns and localities ==
The towns and localities of the Shire of Wandering with population and size figures based on the most recent Australian census:

Locality	Population	Area	Map
Bannister *	72 (SAL 2021)	421.1 km^{2} (162.6 sq mi)	
Codjatotine	42 (SAL 2021)	170 km^{2} (66 sq mi)	
Dwarda	30 (SAL 2021)	117.3 km^{2} (45.3 sq mi)	
Hastings	41 (SAL 2021)	206.6 km^{2} (79.8 sq mi)	
Mount Cooke	^{[1]}	598 km^{2} (231 sq mi)	
North Bannister	0 (SAL 2016)	142.5 km^{2} (55.0 sq mi)	
Pumphreys Bridge	25 (SAL 2021)	75.6 km^{2} (29.2 sq mi)	
Springs	12 (SAL 2016)	211.5 km^{2} (81.7 sq mi)	
Wandering	391 (SAL 2021)	330.5 km^{2} (127.6 sq mi)	

- (* indicates locality is only partially located within this shire)
- ^[1] Locality was accessed as part of North Bannister in the 2021 Australian census, no separate population data available.

== Former towns ==
- Gleneagle
- Mooterdine

== Population ==
Historical population

Year	Pop.	±% p.a.
1911	441	—
1921	564	+2.49%
1933	450	−1.86%
1947	419	−0.51%
1954	557	+4.15%
1961	661	+2.48%
1966	611	−1.56%
1971	500	−3.93%
1976	470	−1.23%

Year	Pop.	±% p.a.
1981	487	+0.71%
1986	402	−3.76%
1991	414	+0.59%
1996	370	−2.22%
2001	318	−2.98%
2006	355	+2.23%
2011	438	+4.29%
2016	444	+0.27%
2021	535	+3.80%

== Heritage-listed places ==
As of 2023, 32 places are heritage-listed in the Shire of Wandering, of which none are on the State Register of Heritage Places.
