= Doodlakine, Western Australia =

Town in the Wheatbelt region of Western Australia

Doodlakine
- Town
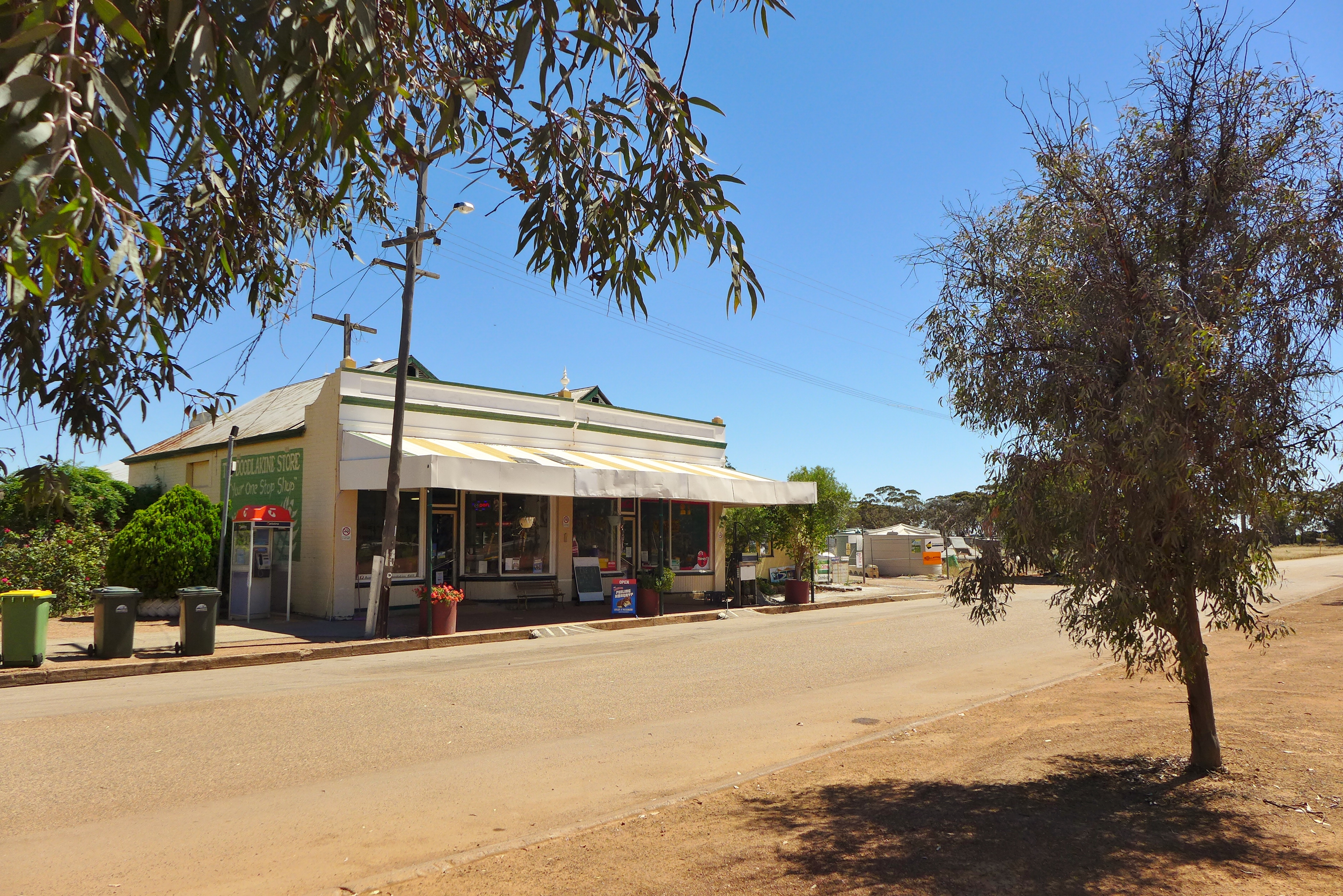
- Doodlakine Store, 2014

- Interactive map of Doodlakine
- Coordinates: 31.61°S 117.88°E
- Country: Australia
- State: Western Australia
- LGA: Shire of Kellerberrin
- Location: 218 km (135 mi) east of Perth; 15 km (9.3 mi) east of Kellerberrin; 41 km (25 mi) west of Merredin
- Established: 1891

Government
  - State electorate: Central Wheatbelt
  - Federal division: Durack

Area
  - Total: 246.8 km^{2} (95.3 sq mi)
- Elevation: 263 m (863 ft)

Population
  - Total: 81 (SAL 2021)
- Postcode: 6411

Doodlakine is a town 220 km (140 mi) east of Perth, Western Australia. It is within the Shire of Kellerberrin along the Great Eastern Highway. The town has a crossing loop for trains on the Perth-to-Kalgoorlie railway and serves as a stop on the MerredinLink rural train service.

== History ==
The area was first visited by Europeans in 1864 when explorers came and charted the area. Doodlakine is an Aboriginal word for a particular rock formation north of the townsite.

An area close to the townsite, along the road to the Yilgarn goldfields and near a reliable water supply, was set aside in 1891 for a town to be established. This was gazetted as the Doodlakine townsite in the same year. Later a railway line was constructed through the area about 3 km (1.9 mi) south of the town, and the government soon subdivided the area along the line. This area was gazetted as a second part of the townsite in 1899.

In 1932 the Wheat Pool of Western Australia announced that the town would have two grain elevators, each fitted with an engine, installed at the railway siding.

A music concert is held at the pub each year, attracting hundreds of people from around the state, who camp behind the pub.

Doodlakine is known locally as "Doodlie".

== Economy ==
The surrounding areas produce wheat and other cereal crops. The town is a receival site for Cooperative Bulk Handling.

== Rail services ==
Transwa's MerredinLink and Prospector services stop at Doodlakine, with at least one service each day.

Preceding station	Transwa	Following station
Kellerberrin towards East Perth	MerredinLink	Hines Hill towards Merredin
Kellerberrin towards East Perth	Prospector	Hines Hill towards Kalgoorlie
