= Dwarda, Western Australia =

Town in the Wheatbelt region of Western Australia

Dwarda
- Town
- Coordinates: 32°46′S 116°41′E
- Country: Australia
- State: Western Australia
- LGA(s): Shire of Wandering
- Location: 131 km (81 mi) from Perth; 11 km (6.8 mi) from Wandering
- Established: 1912

Government
  - State electorate(s): Wagin
  - Federal division(s): O'Connor

Area
  - Total: 117.3 km^{2} (45.3 sq mi)
- Elevation: 246 m (807 ft)

Population
  - Total(s): 30 (SAL 2021)
- Postcode: 6308

Dwarda is a small town in the Wheatbelt region of Western Australia, 11 kilometres (7 mi) south of the town of Wandering on the Hotham River.

== History ==
The name is a contraction of nearby Dwardadine Creek, with dwarda being a Noongar name for dingo. The townsite was first requested by the Wandering Road Board in 1912, with the hope it could become a future terminus for the Hotham Valley Railway, and the townsite, initially called Dampier, was gazetted in 1914. The town however did not attract settlement. In 1940–41 a timber mill was built here by JC "Charlie" Tucak, and operated for some years.

The townsite is owned by the Horan family, though most of the buildings were destroyed by arson in the mid-1980s.
