= Yelbeni, Western Australia =

Yelbeni
- Town
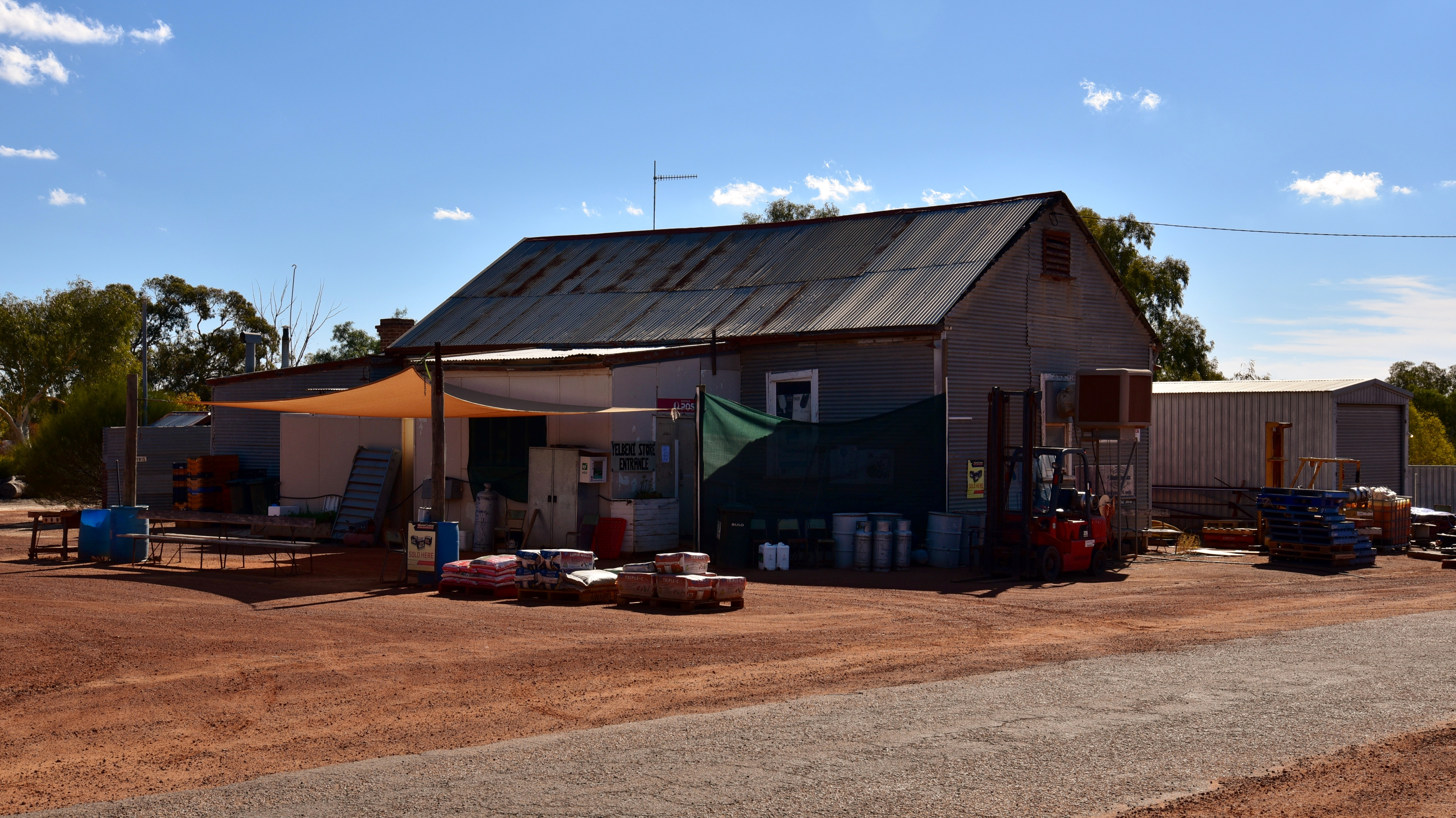
- Yelbeni Store

- Coordinates: 31°10′S 117°40′E
- Country: Australia
- State: Western Australia
- LGA(s): Shire of Trayning
- Location: 222 km (138 mi) ENE of Perth; 14 km (8.7 mi) WSW of Trayning
- Established: 1912

Government
  - State electorate(s): Central Wheatbelt
  - Federal division(s): Durack

Area
  - Total: 1.6 km^{2} (0.62 sq mi)
- Elevation: 341 m (1,119 ft)

Population
  - Total(s): 0 (SAL 2021)
- Postcode: 6487

Yelbeni is a small town 222 km east-northeast of Perth, Western Australia along the Nungarin-Wyalkatchem Road situated in the Wheatbelt region of Western Australia. At the 2006 census, Yelbeni had a population of 118.

The town was originally planned as a railway siding along the Dowerin to Merredin railway line. Land was set aside in 1910 and was surveyed and gazetted in 1912. The town was originally known as Yelbene but was changed before it was gazetted to reflect a more precise pronunciation. The word is Aboriginal in origin and is derived from the nearby Yelbene Well, but its meaning is unknown.

The Yelbeni town hall was initially constructed by members of the community in 1913; it has timber frame and a corrugated iron exterior. Although it has had some extensions over the years, the original hall still stands, and is being assessed for entry into the State Register of Heritage Places.

In 1932 the Wheat Pool of Western Australia announced that the town would have two grain elevators, each fitted with an engine, installed at the railway siding. The location was one of five sidings where bulk handling was to start operating on the Western Australian Government Railways system.

In 2012 the location was the name of the CBH class standard gauge locomotive number CBH 122.
