= Mandiga, Western Australia =

Mandiga Western Australia
- Coordinates: 30.80°S 117.767°E
- Established: 1919
- Postcode(s): 6477
- Elevation: 377 m (1,237 ft)
- Location: 264 km (164 mi) north east of Perth; 8 km (5 mi) west of Bencubbin
- LGA(s): Shire of Mount Marshall
- State electorate(s): Central Wheatbelt
- Federal division(s): Durack

Mandiga is a town in Western Australia, in the Shire of Mount Marshall. It is located between the towns of Koorda and Mukinbudin in the Wheatbelt region.

Originating as a railway siding on the Wyalkatchem to Mount Marshall railway line, which was opened in 1917, a town had been considered in the area in 1916 when the railway was planned. The town was gazetted in 1919, but little development took place in the town.

The name is Aboriginal in origin and came from a list supplied by the surveyor Frederick Brockman who, in turn, got the names from an indigenous person in Margaret River. The name is thought to mean young girl and is correctly spelt as Mandigga.
