= Grain Pool =

Agricultural cooperative in Western Australia

- Formerly: Wheat Pool
- Company type: Agricultural cooperative
- Industry: Grain
- Founded: 1922
- Defunct: November 2002
- Fate: Merged with Co-operative Bulk Handling to form the CBH Group
- Headquarters: Western Australia

The Grain Pool, formerly the Wheat Pool, was an agricultural cooperative of wheat growers in Western Australia. Founded in 1922, it merged with Co-operative Bulk Handling to form the CBH Group in 2002.

== History ==
The Wheat Pool was formed in 1922. A conference had been held by wheat growers in Perth in March 1922, where it was decided to consider the formation of the pool rather than depend on speculative trading. In June 1922, the chairman of the trustees announced that the state government would not introduce legislation to continue state pooling but that the new pool scheme would commence operating independently. The pool had sources adequate finance from the Commonwealth Bank to pay advances and had negotiated with pools in the eastern states to reduce competition. Participants in the scheme were sent a circular by the pool trustees. The circular outlined details of chartering ships, delaying construction of bulk handling facilities in Fremantle, construction of holding sheds in other areas, negotiations with the Mill Owners Association and quashing rumours that contracts were not binding.

For the 1923 harvest, the pool collected 9.75 million bushels of wheat.

Over the course of the 1924–1925 harvest, the pool received over 14 million bushels with a return to growers of a little over 6s per bushel, not including rail freight. In 1925 farmers claimed they had been given advice to store their grain and contributing to the pool later hoping the price would rise.

The quantity of wheat collected the next season was only just over six million bushels; the 1926–1927 season resulted in 17.93 million bushels being collected by the pool.

Following crop failures in India through 1928, the pool supplied over 14.25 million bushels to cover the short fall at prices.

A record cargo of wheat for the port of Geraldton in 1930 was loaded by the Pool aboard the SS Avala; the vessel was loaded with 80,426 bags, a mass of about 6,550 long tons (6,655 t).

In 1932, the state government was approached by the pool to confer upon the trustees sole acquiring rights of the land needed to set up bulk handling facilities. Initially the scheme was strongly opposed, and the bill introduced into the parliament was defeated as it was seen to grant a monopoly. In 1933, the bill was reintroduced after a two-season trial in the Wyalkatchem area. Premier of Western Australia Philip Collier, revealed that leases of land at 48 country railway sidings had been awarded to Cooperative Bulk Handling.

By 1935 the pool had estimated a harvest of over 27 million bushels after good rains had been recorded in July; the estimates were later downgraded to 20 million after a dry spell prior to harvesting.

The marketable harvest from the 1942–43 harvest collected by the pool was 18 million bushels. An early estimate of the following year's production was about 19 million bushels, of which 16.5 million was likely to be marketable.

In 1962, the Wheat Pool was renamed the Grain Pool, reflecting its increasingly diverse portfolio of wheat, barley, oats, lupins and canola. In November 2002, the Grain Pool merged with Co-operative Bulk Handling to form the CBH Group.
