= Wandering, Western Australia =

Town in the Wheatbelt region of Western Australia

Wandering
- Town
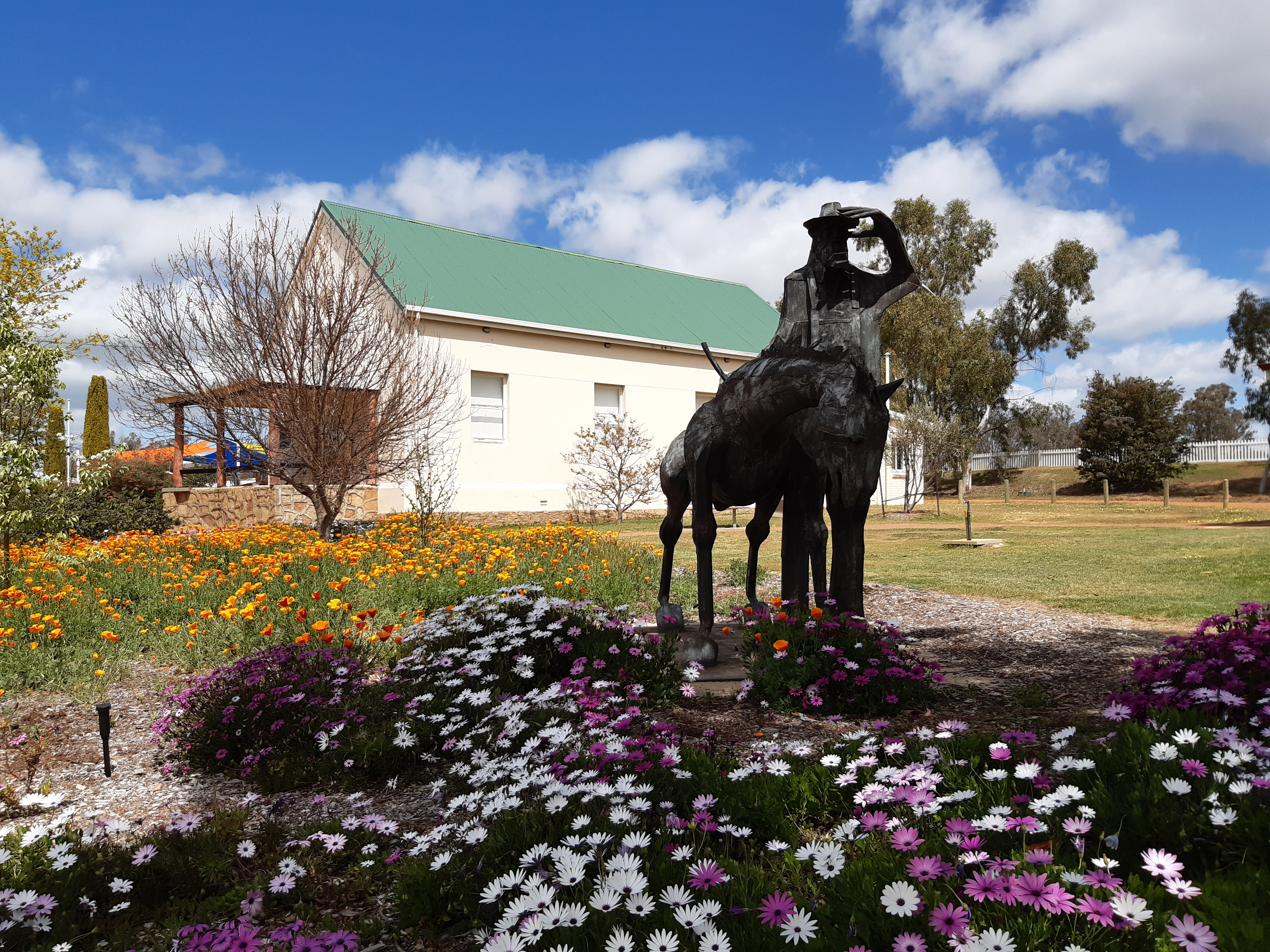
- The Wandering Agricultural Hall and "The Horses Came First" statue

- Interactive map of Wandering
- Coordinates: 32°41′00″S 116°41′00″E
- Country: Australia
- State: Western Australia
- LGA: Shire of Wandering
- Location: 120 km (75 mi) from Perth
- Established: 1877

Government
  - State electorate: Wagin
  - Federal division: O'Connor

Area
  - Total: 330.5 km^{2} (127.6 sq mi)
- Elevation: 294 m (965 ft)

Population
  - Total: 391 (SAL 2021)
- Postcode: 6308
- Mean max temp: 23.1 °C (73.6 °F)
- Mean min temp: 8.4 °C (47.1 °F)
- Annual rainfall: 613.7 mm (24.16 in)

Wandering is a town in the Wheatbelt region of Western Australia, approximately 120 kilometres (75 mi) from the state capital, Perth, just off the Albany Highway. It is the main town in the Shire of Wandering. In the 2016 census, Wandering had a population of 294.

== History ==
The area's name appears to come from a local Aboriginal word, "wandooin", after the wandoo or white gum tree that is prevalent in the area, although some sources suggest it was named to recall the first sighting of wandering stock, and was originally applied to Wandering Brook, first recorded in 1866.

Wandering was first settled in 1859 by members of the George Stedman Watts family when their straying wagon team horses were found grazing in lush grass around a fresh water spring known to this day as Horse Well. In 1861, they selected an area on what is now the south-eastern approach to the town, and named it "Grassdale". The property was owned by the Watts family until being purchased recently by another local farmer. A road board (later to become the Shire Council) was convened in 1874 within slightly different boundaries to the present day. By 1877, there was sufficient population in the area for the government to set aside land for a school.

In 1911–12, the government surveyed a number of lots and then gazetted the townsite of Wandering. However, the decision two decades earlier to build the railway some distance to the east restricted the town's growth. Also, fresh water was not readily available – the town was reliant on two Water Corporation dams until scheme water was extended here in 1997. Subsequently, rural residential subdivisions in the area on 1,600 m^{2} (17,000 sq ft) lots have been developed.

From 1944 to 1977, the Wandering Mission, also known as St Francis Xavier Mission, was operated as a home for Aboriginal children by the Pallottine Fathers. A recollection of growing up in the mission is in Glenyse Ward's autobiography, Wandering Girl (Magabala Books, Broome, 1988). The mission was later the subject of a number of sexual abuse claims.

== Present day ==
Wandering is primarily an agricultural region, which produces hay, cereal crops, pulse crops (such as lupins), oil seed (canola), wool, lamb and beef. Timber milling and viticulture are also practised. The town's school (K-7) still operates with mixed-grade classes, and accommodation is offered at a caravan park with powered sites. The original Agricultural Hall (1896) now hosts a telecentre for the use of the town's residents, and a nearby hall hosts local community groups and clubs.

== Climate ==
Wandering has a Mediterranean climate with hot dry summers and cool, damp winters. In winter, it is one of the coldest towns in Western Australia, commonly recording temperatures below 0 °C (32 °F).

Climate data for Wandering, 1998–present averages (from current site), 1901–present (extremes including comparison site, which recorded temperature from 1901 to 2003)
| Month | Jan | Feb | Mar | Apr | May | Jun | Jul | Aug | Sep | Oct | Nov | Dec | Year |
|---|---|---|---|---|---|---|---|---|---|---|---|---|---|
| Record high °C (°F) | 45.6 (114.1) | 45.1 (113.2) | 41.9 (107.4) | 37.6 (99.7) | 33.2 (91.8) | 25.0 (77.0) | 23.8 (74.8) | 26.6 (79.9) | 31.6 (88.9) | 36.9 (98.4) | 41.3 (106.3) | 43.8 (110.8) | 45.6 (114.1) |
| Mean daily maximum °C (°F) | 32.4 (90.3) | 31.8 (89.2) | 28.9 (84.0) | 24.5 (76.1) | 20.1 (68.2) | 16.9 (62.4) | 15.8 (60.4) | 16.6 (61.9) | 18.6 (65.5) | 22.5 (72.5) | 27.4 (81.3) | 30.6 (87.1) | 23.8 (74.8) |
| Mean daily minimum °C (°F) | 14.2 (57.6) | 14.5 (58.1) | 12.6 (54.7) | 9.4 (48.9) | 6.2 (43.2) | 4.7 (40.5) | 4.2 (39.6) | 4.1 (39.4) | 4.8 (40.6) | 6.3 (43.3) | 9.5 (49.1) | 12.2 (54.0) | 8.6 (47.5) |
| Record low °C (°F) | 3.3 (37.9) | 2.8 (37.0) | −0.7 (30.7) | −2.2 (28.0) | −5.6 (21.9) | −5.7 (21.7) | −4.8 (23.4) | −3.9 (25.0) | −3.5 (25.7) | −2.6 (27.3) | −1.7 (28.9) | 1.0 (33.8) | −5.7 (21.7) |
| Average precipitation mm (inches) | 14.0 (0.55) | 14.9 (0.59) | 22.5 (0.89) | 30.4 (1.20) | 56.4 (2.22) | 78.4 (3.09) | 98.6 (3.88) | 94.1 (3.70) | 55.5 (2.19) | 29.1 (1.15) | 18.9 (0.74) | 14.8 (0.58) | 523.9 (20.63) |
| Average precipitation days | 2.8 | 2.3 | 4.3 | 7.0 | 12.6 | 18.0 | 20.8 | 19.4 | 15.0 | 8.2 | 5.1 | 3.3 | 118.8 |
| Average relative humidity (%) | 28 | 28 | 32 | 42 | 52 | 58 | 63 | 60 | 57 | 47 | 31 | 26 | 44 |
Source 1:
Source 2:
