= CBH Group =

Grain-handling co-operative in Western Australia

- Type: Cooperative
- Industry: Agriculture
- Founded: 5 April 1933
- Headquarters: Level 6, 240 St Georges Terrace, Perth, Western Australia
- Area served: Western Australia
- Key people: Ben Macnamara (CEO); Simon Stead (Chairman)
- Products: Grain marketing, logistics
- Revenue: $4.19 billion (September 2019)
- Net income: $60.8 million (September 2019)
- Total assets: 2,820,196,000 Australian dollar (2023)
- Number of employees: 1,100 (September 2019)
- Website: cbh.com.au

The CBH Group – commonly known as CBH, an acronym for Co-operative Bulk Handling – is an organisation that operates the vast majority of cereal grain receival points in Western Australia (WA). A cooperative owned by farmers, CBH also stores, transports, processes and markets grain from throughout the Wheatbelt region of WA.

== History ==
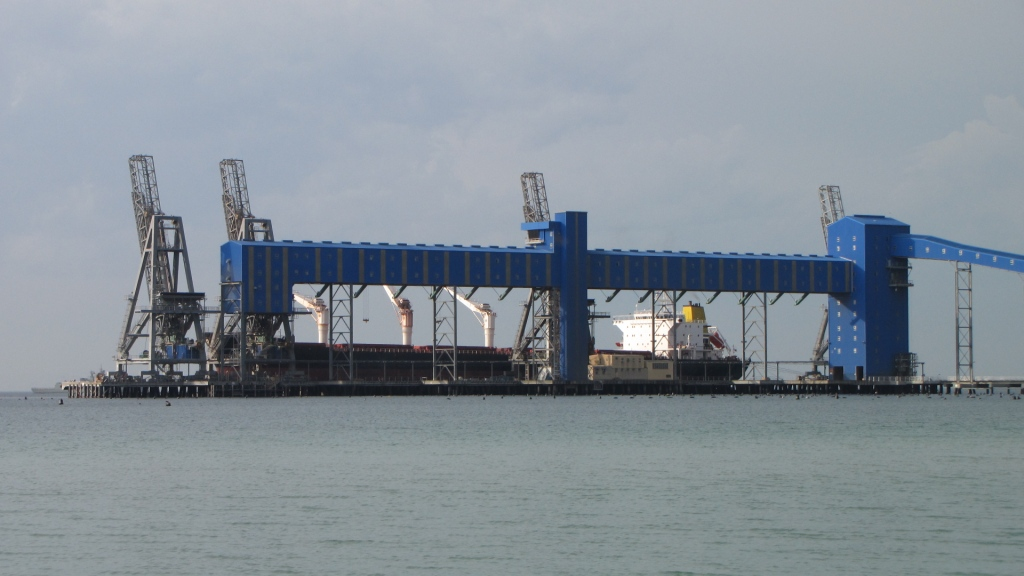
CBH's Kwinana grain loading terminal in November 2009

CBH was formed on 5 April 1933, at a time when a royal commission on bulk handling of grain was in progress, and after over 20 years of failed proposals for bulk handling of grain in Western Australia.

The trustees of the Wheat Board of Western Australia and Wesfarmers registered the company together with capital of £100,000 divided evenly into 100,000 shares. The cooperative was formed under the principle of one person, one vote, regardless of the amount of grain supplied.

CBH merged with the Grain Pool in November 2002, after the Parliament of Western Australia passed legislation allowing the merger to go ahead.

In 2016, the Australian Taxation Office revealed that despite generating more than $3.4 billion in revenue in 2013/14, the company paid no tax. This made it Australia's biggest revenue earner not to pay tax in the period under review.

== Transport ==
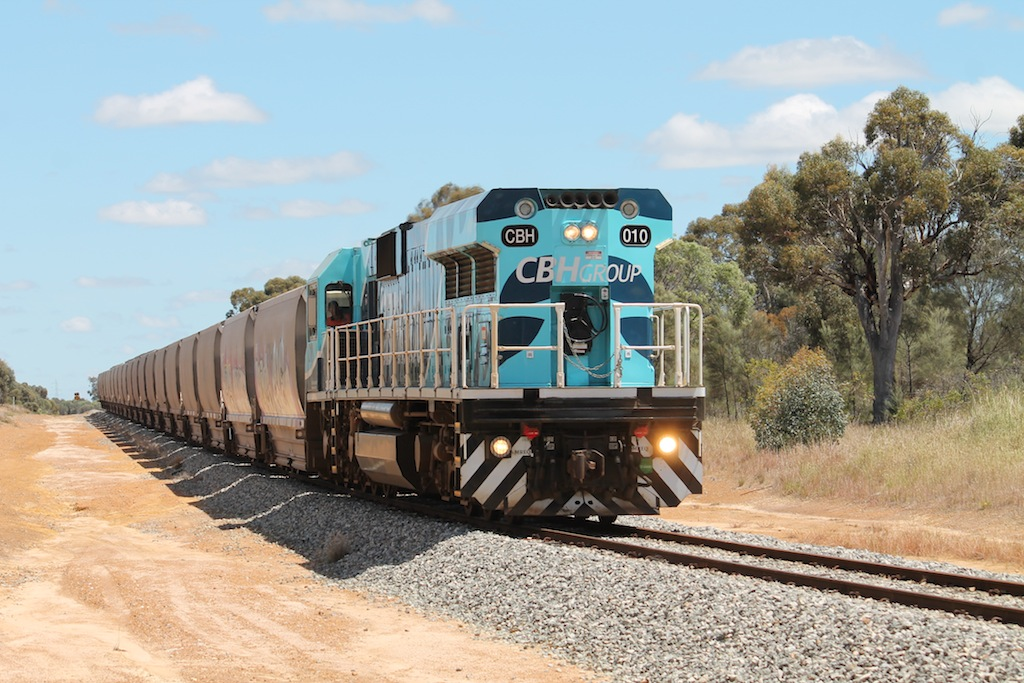
CBH class hauled train at Yilliminning in October 2013

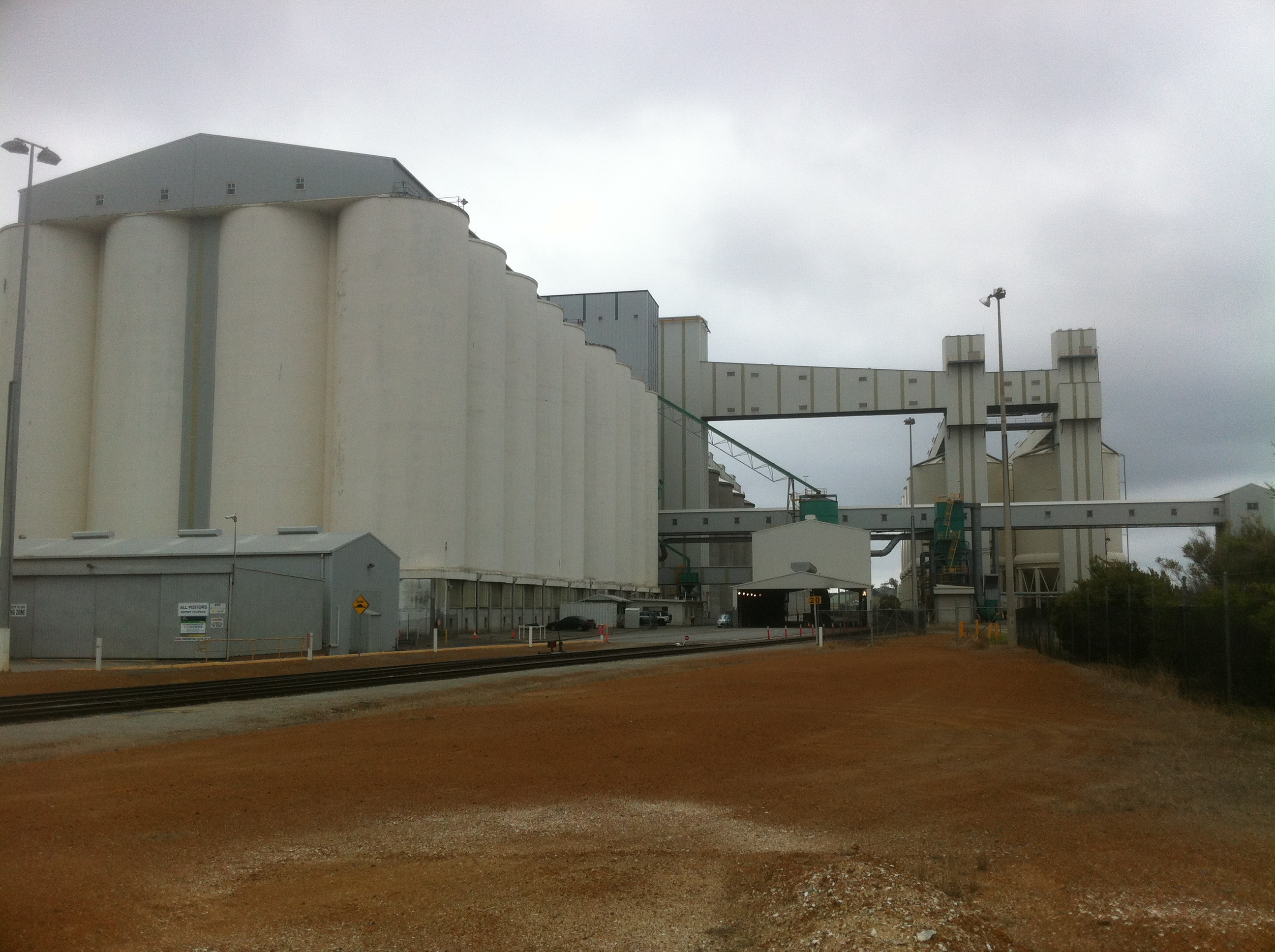
Grain silos at Port of Albany 2016

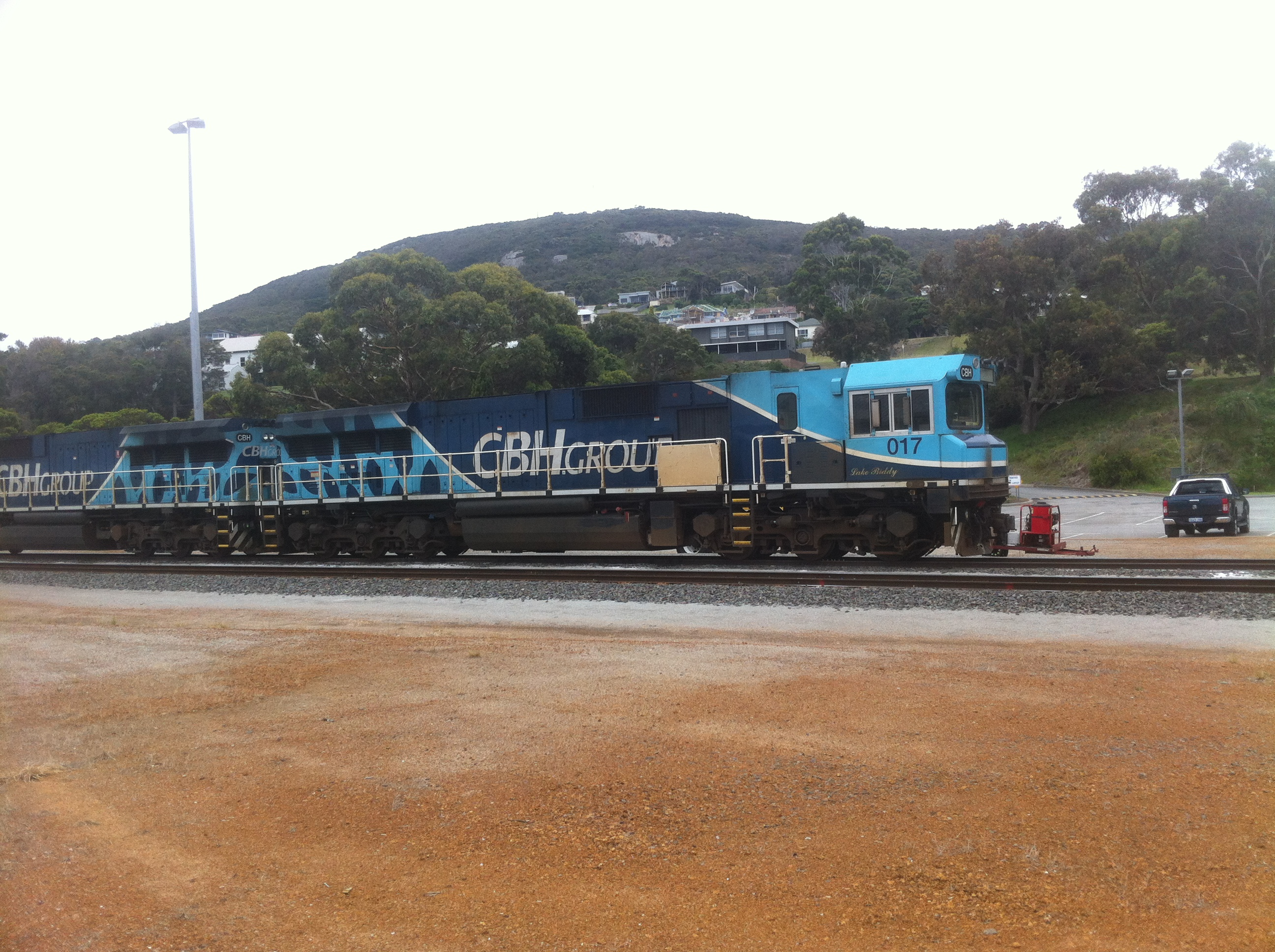
CBH locomotive at Port of Albany 2016

During the early years most grain movement was by rail over the Western Australian Government Railways network, with sidings and branch lines specifically serving wheat growing areas. Many of the branch lines and rail facilities have not been updated or maintained, with road transport increasing in many areas.

In 2009, CBH decided to put its rail grain haulage services out to tender for the first time. It aimed that the amount of grain transported by rail rise from 50% to 70%. CBH settled on a business model that saw it invest in new locomotives and grain wagons, with day-to-day operations contracted out.

In December 2010, CBH awarded Watco Australia a ten-year contract to operate services in the south of Western Australia. To operate the services, CBH purchased 22 CBH class locomotives from MotivePower, Boise and 574 grain wagons from Bradken, Xuzhou.

Under the agreement, Watco was responsible for providing a comprehensive rail logistics planning service, including train planning and scheduling, tracking, maintenance, inventory control, and crew management. Watco operated and maintained the rolling stock, with ownership remaining with CBH.

The services link various CBH grain collection points in the wheatbelt with CBH terminal and port facilities in Albany, Geraldton, Esperance and Kwinana. CBH operate on the Arc Infrastructure managed open access network.

Although the contract officially commenced on 1 May 2012, Watco operated its first service on 30 March 2012. Because of a delay in the delivery of the rolling stock, QR National continued to operate some 3 ft 6 in (1,067 mm) gauge services until October 2012, while to operate standard gauge services, locomotives were hired from Chicago Freight Car Leasing Australia and SCT Logistics. A further three locomotives were delivered in 2015 as compensation for late delivery of the original order.

In October 2013, CBH referred an ongoing dispute with the network owner Brookfield Rail over track access prices and the state of the network to the Economic Regulation Authority. In December 2017 CBH Group expanded its locomotive fleet purchasing 10 DB class locomotives from Aurizon.

When next tendered, the contract was awarded to Aurizon for six years with an option to extend to 10 years. Aurizon introduced a further three sets of wagons to the 10 owned by CBH. Although scheduled to transition in May 2022, all parties agreed to bring the handover date forward to September 2021.

=== Locomotive Fleet ===
Class	Image	Type	Gauge	Top speed (km/h)	Built	Number	Units	Notes
Owned Fleet
CBH class		Diesel-electric	Standard, Cape	90	2011-2012, 2015	25	CBH001 - CBH017; CBH023 - CBH025; CBH118 - CBH122	New Build. CBH001 - CBH017 and CBH023 - CBH025 configured for Cape gauge. CBH118 - CBH122 configured for Standard gauge.
200 class		Diesel-electric	Cape	100	2025-2026	17	201-217	New Build.
300 class		Diesel-electric	Standard	100	2026	7	301-307	New Build.
Previous Fleet
DBZ class		Diesel-electric	Cape	90	1982-1983	10	DBZ2301 - DBZ2308; DBZ2312 - DBZ2313	Acquired from Aurizon in 2017. Sold to Watco Australia in 2024.

== Tonnages ==
In 1999/2000 season CBH received a record amount of grain, 12.2 million tonnes in all, made up of 11 different grain types.

CBH received a new record harvest of 14.7 million tonnes from grain growers in Western Australia during the 2003/2004 season. This record was broken in 2013/14, with 15.8 million tonnes of grain handled by January 2014.

New records were set in the 2016/17 season when the company received 16.6 million tonnes of grain. The company expected over $5 billion to have been pumped into the Western Australian economy as a result of the record harvest. A new record for the month of December was set with 831,000 tonnes of grain moved to port via rail. The highest monthly shipping record was also broken in January with 1.88 million tonnes shipped out. The previous monthly shipping record of 1.66 million tonnes had been set in February 2014.

== Harvest management ==
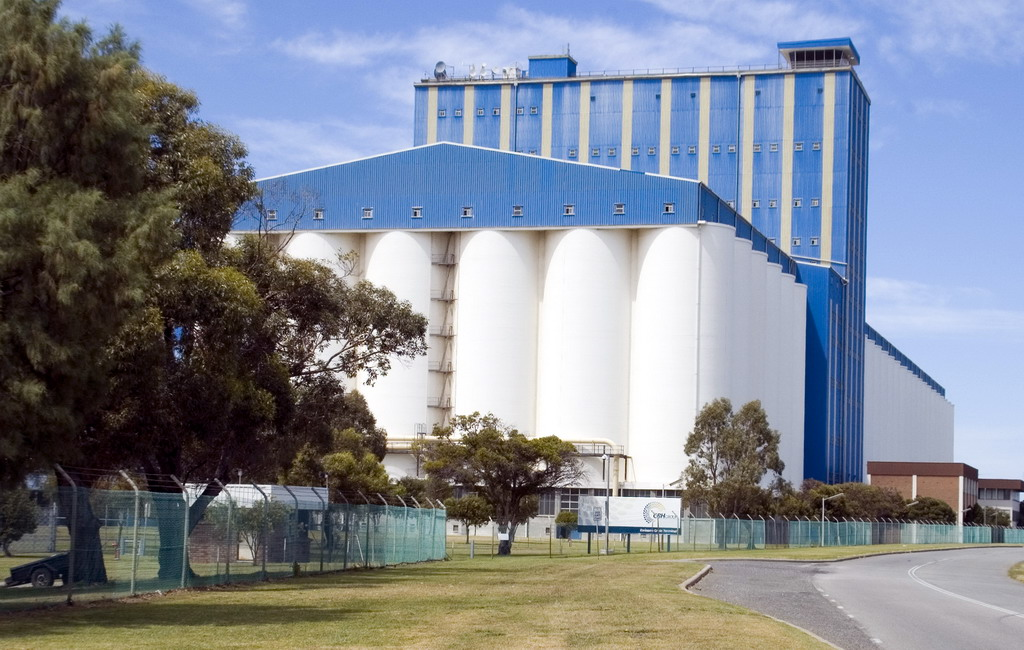
Kwinana silo in November 2006

Historically the CBH system had up to 300 receival points – in most cases tied into the Western Australian Government Railways railway network, as the railway lines were the prime grain transport method.

By the 2000s, the number of receival points had been reduced to less than 200 and the locations of the receival points became part of a system of management zones:

- Albany zone
- Esperance zone
- Geraldton zone
- Kwinana zone

Each zone is further broken down into areas.
