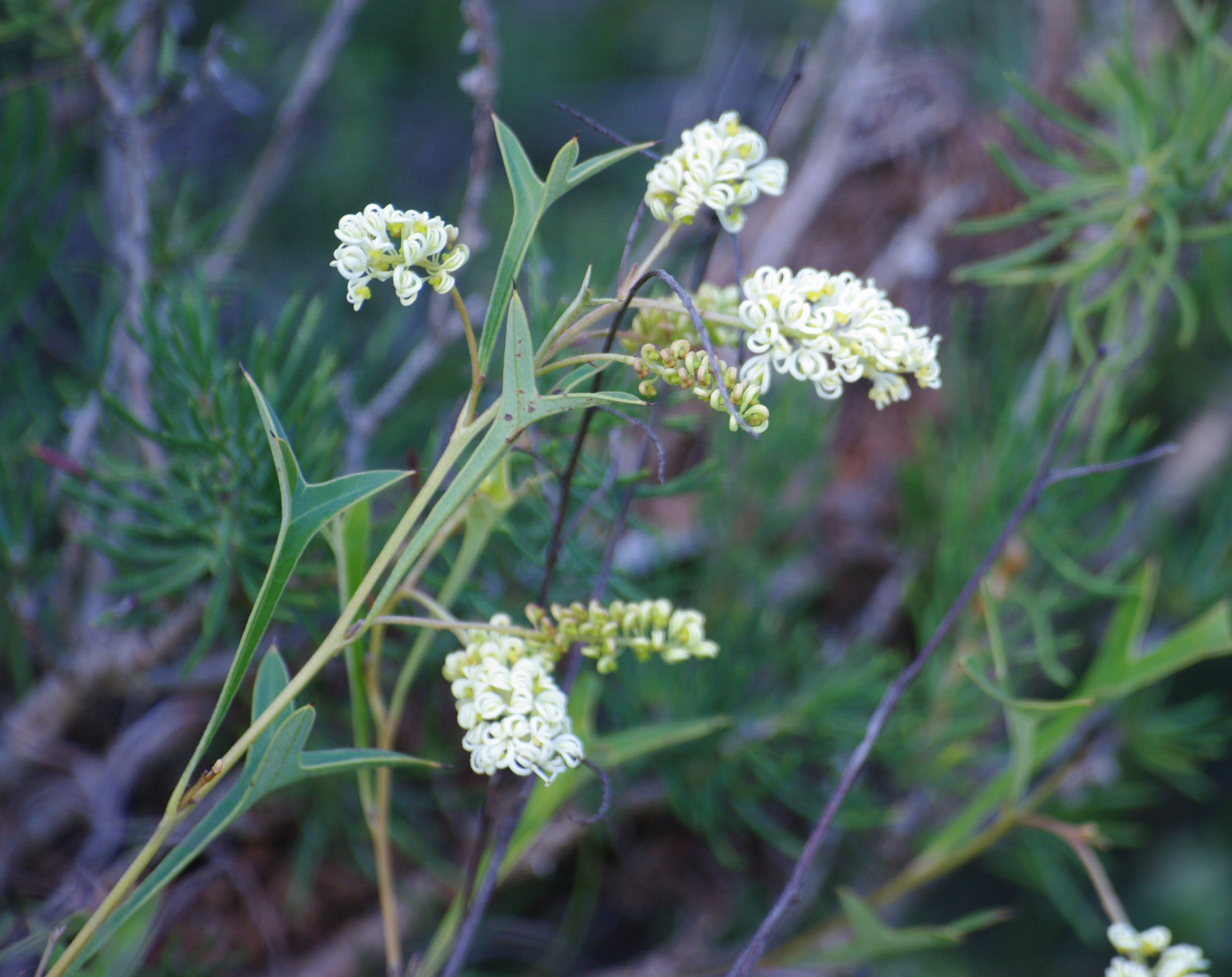

Scientific classification
- Kingdom: Plantae
- Clade: Tracheophytes
- Clade: Angiosperms
- Clade: Eudicots
- Order: Proteales
- Family: Proteaceae
- Genus: Grevillea
- Species: G. synapheae

Binomial name
- Grevillea synapheae R.Br.

= Grevillea synapheae =

Species of shrub endemic to Western Australia

Grevillea synapheae, commonly known as catkin grevillea, is species of flowering plant in the family Proteaceae and is endemic to the southwest of Western Australia. It is a prostrate to erect shrub usually with divided leaves with 3 to 7 triangular to more or less linear lobes, and clusters of white to creamy yellow flowers.

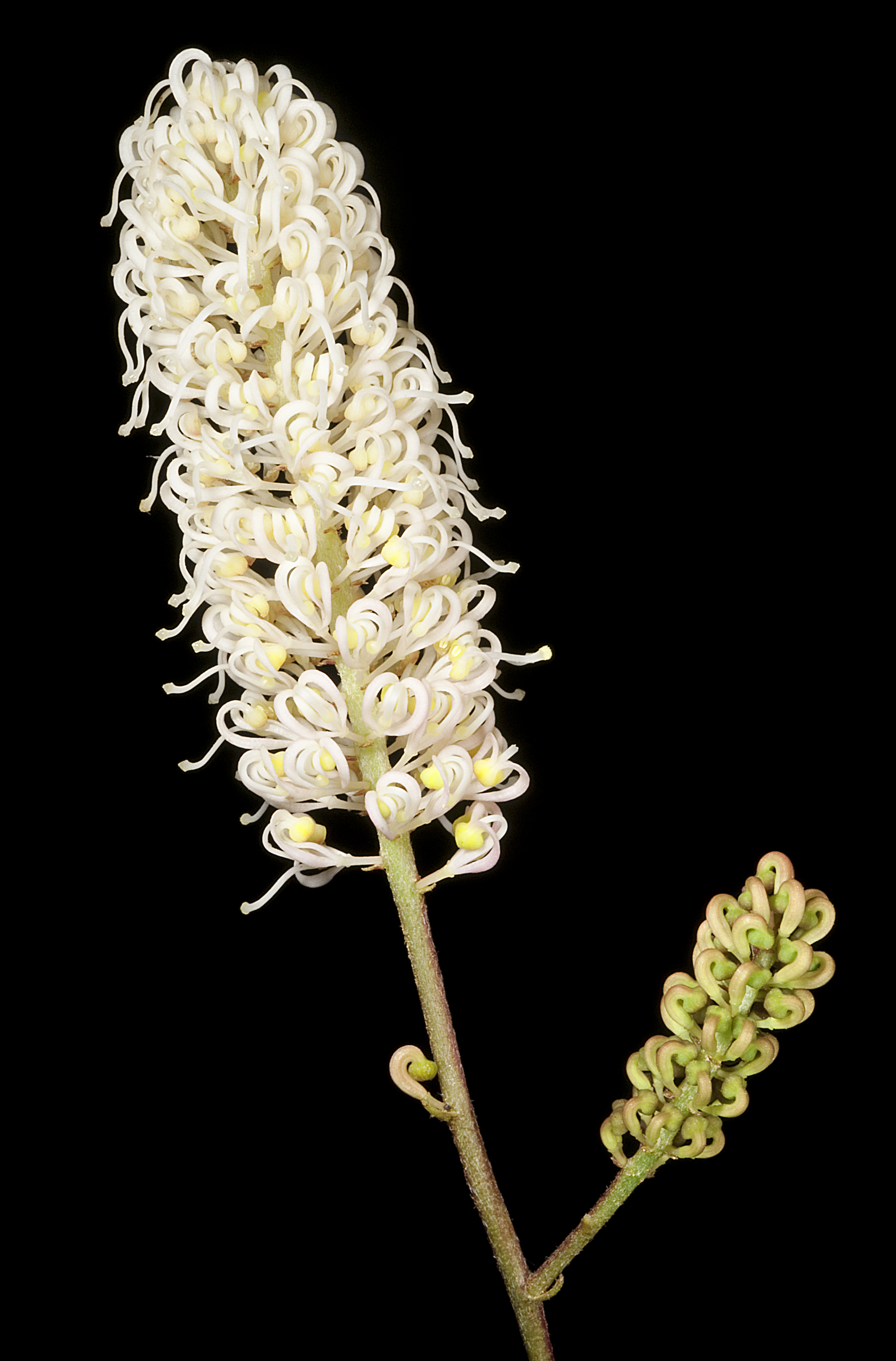
Subspecies minyulo

== Description ==
Grevillea synapheae is a prostrate to erect, lignotuber-forming shrub that typically grows to a height of 0.2–1.5 m (7.9 in – 4 ft 11.1 in), its branches glabrous to sparsely woolly-hairy. The leaves are variable but mostly wedge-shaped with 3 to 7 triangular to more or less linear lobes 10–25 mm (0.39–0.98 in) long and 2–12 mm (0.079–0.472 in) wide. The flowers are arranged in clusters with up to 6 branches, each branch cylindrical on a rachis 10–60 mm (0.39–2.36 in) long. The flowers are white to creamy yellow, the pistil 4–5 mm (0.16–0.20 in) long. Flowering occurs from July to October, and the fruit is a wrinkled, elliptic to oval follicle 8–13 mm (0.31–0.51 in) long.

This grevillea is closely related to G. trifida, G. muelleri and G. prominens.

== Taxonomy ==
Grevillea synapheae was first formally described by botanist Robert Brown in 1830 in Supplementum primum Prodromi florae Novae Hollandiae from specimens collected in the Swan River Colony by Charles Fraser. The specific epithet (synapheae) refers to similarity of the leaf shape and flower colour to the genus Synaphea.

The names of five subspecies are accepted by the Australian Plant Census:

- Grevillea synapheae subsp. A Flora of Australia (S.D.Hopper 6333) WA Herbarium is a sprawling shrub, the leaves with 3 to 7 narrow lobes sometimes further divided, the end lobes straight, rigid and narrowly triangular, 5–20 mm (0.20–0.79 in) long and 2–3 mm (0.079–0.118 in) wide.
- Grevillea synapheae subsp. latiloba (Meisn.) Makinson is a mounded to spreading or erect shrub, the leaves with 3 to 5 deeply divided lobes usually further divided, the end lobes triangular to oblong, 2–17 mm (0.079–0.669 in) long and 2–7 mm (0.079–0.276 in) wide.
- Grevillea synapheae subsp. minyulo Makinson is a low, spreading to sprawling shrub, the leaves almost pinnatisect, usually with 7 lobes usually further divided, the end lobes linear, 7–30 mm (0.28–1.18 in) long and 2–3 mm (0.079–0.118 in) wide.
- Grevillea synapheae subsp. pachyphylla Olde & Marriott is a shrub up to 1 m (3 ft 3 in) tall, the leaves mostly divided with 3 to 5 lobes sometimes divided again, the end lobes egg-shaped to oblong, 10–22 mm (0.39–0.87 in) long and 2–6 mm (0.079–0.236 in) wide.
- Grevillea synapheae R.Br. subsp. synapheae is a prostrate to low, spreading shrub, the leaves usually deeply divided with 3 to 7 lobes often divided again, the end lobes narrowly oblong to narrowly triangular, 2–17 mm (0.079–0.669 in) long and 2–5 mm (0.079–0.197 in) wide.

== Distribution ==
All five subspecies of G. synaphaea occur in the south-west of Western Australia.

- Subspecies A is only known from Mount Misery near Dandaragan in the Geraldton Sandplains bioregion, where it grows in heath.
- Subspecies latiloba grows in woodland or shrubland from near Bindoon to Mogumber in the Jarrah Forest bioregion.
- Subspecies minyulo grows in heath in the Dandaragan-Cataby area in the Geraldton Sandplains and Swan Coastal Plain bioregions.
- Subspecies pachyphylla usually grows in open heath on rocky hills from near Badgingarra to Eneabba in the Avon Wheatbelt, Geraldton Sandplains, Jarrah Forest and Swan Coastal Plain bioregions.
- Subspecies synapheae is moderately common on and to the east of the Darling Range, including from Perth suburbs to as far south as Narrogin and Williams, and as far north as Gingin and Toodyay in the Avon Wheatbelt, Geraldton Sandplains, Jarrah Forest and Swan Coastal Plain bioregions.

== Conservation status ==
Subspecies A, latiloba and minyulo are listed as "Priority One" by the Government of Western Australia Department of Biodiversity, Conservation and Attractions, meaning that they are known from only one or a few locations which are potentially at risk. but subsp. pachyphylla and synapheae are listed as "not threatened".

== Use in horticulture ==
Catkin grevillea is sold commercially and is recommended for use as a low ornamental shrub that is suitable for wide verges, median strips, open locations as well as reserves and parks. When planted is numbers it makes low hedge or barrier or groundcover. It can tolerate drought and a medium frost and soils with a high lime content. It does require well drained soil and part shade to full sun. The plant is a good bird attractor which is used for food and habitat. It can cause skin irritations.
