= Mogumber =

Mogumber may refer to

- Mogumber Nature Reserve, a protected area near Moore River, Western Australia
- Mogumber, Western Australia, a small rural settlement in the Shire of Victoria Plains, located on the site of the former Mogumber Native Mission
- Moore River Native Settlement, also known as Mogumber Native Mission
- Darwinia carnea, a plant species commonly known as Mogumber bell
