= List of State Register of Heritage Places in the Shire of Corrigin =

List of heritage sites in Western Australia

The State Register of Heritage Places is maintained by the Heritage Council of Western Australia. As of 2026, 198 places are heritage-listed in the Shire of Corrigin, of which four are on the State Register of Heritage Places.

== List ==
The Western Australian State Register of Heritage Places, as of 2026, lists the following four state registered places within the Shire of Corrigin:

| Place name | Place # | Street number | Street name | Suburb or town | Co-ordinates | Notes & former names | Photo |
|---|---|---|---|---|---|---|---|
| Corrigin Town Hall & Road Board Office (former) | 586 | 21 | Goyder Street | Corrigin | 32.330337°S 117.875265°E | | |
| Railway Water Tank, Corrigin | 8190 | | Corrigin Railway Reserve, alongside Connelly Parrade | Corrigin | 32.330499°S 117.871933°E | | |
| Corrigin Town Hall | 24786 | | Goyder Street | Corrigin | 32.330246°S 117.875265°E | Part of the Corrigin Town Hall & Road Board Office (former) precinct (586) | |
| Corrigin Roads Board office (former) | 24798 | | Goyder Street | Corrigin | 32.330428°S 117.875265°E | Part of the Corrigin Town Hall & Road Board Office (former) precinct (586) | |
