= D. carnea =

D. carnea may refer to:

- Dalea carnea, a flowering plant
- Darwinia carnea, an evergreen shrub
- Dendronephthya carnea, a soft coral
- Duebenia carnea, a cup fungus
