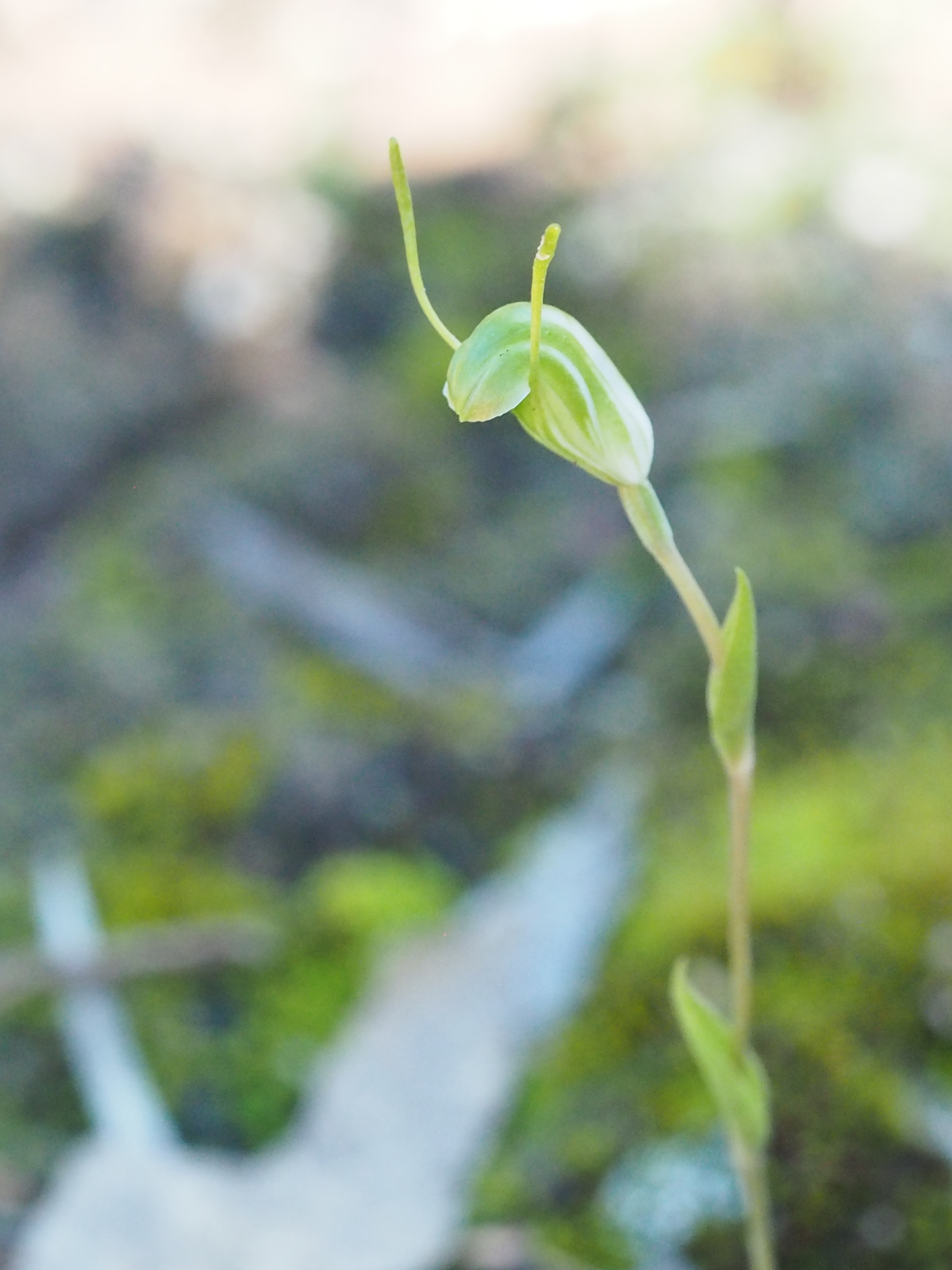
- Pterostylis scitula in Candys Bush Reserve, Moora

Scientific classification
- Kingdom: Plantae
- Clade: Tracheophytes
- Clade: Angiosperms
- Clade: Monocots
- Order: Asparagales
- Family: Orchidaceae
- Subfamily: Orchidoideae
- Tribe: Cranichideae
- Genus: Pterostylis
- Species: P. scitula

Binomial name
- Pterostylis scitula D.L.Jones & C.J.French

= Pterostylis scitula =

Elegant snail orchid

Species of orchid

Pterostylis scitula, commonly known as the elegant snail orchid, is a species of orchid endemic to the south-west of Western Australia. Both flowering and non-flowering plants have a small rosette of leaves flat on the ground. Flowering plants have a single, small green and white flower with leaves on the flowering stem.

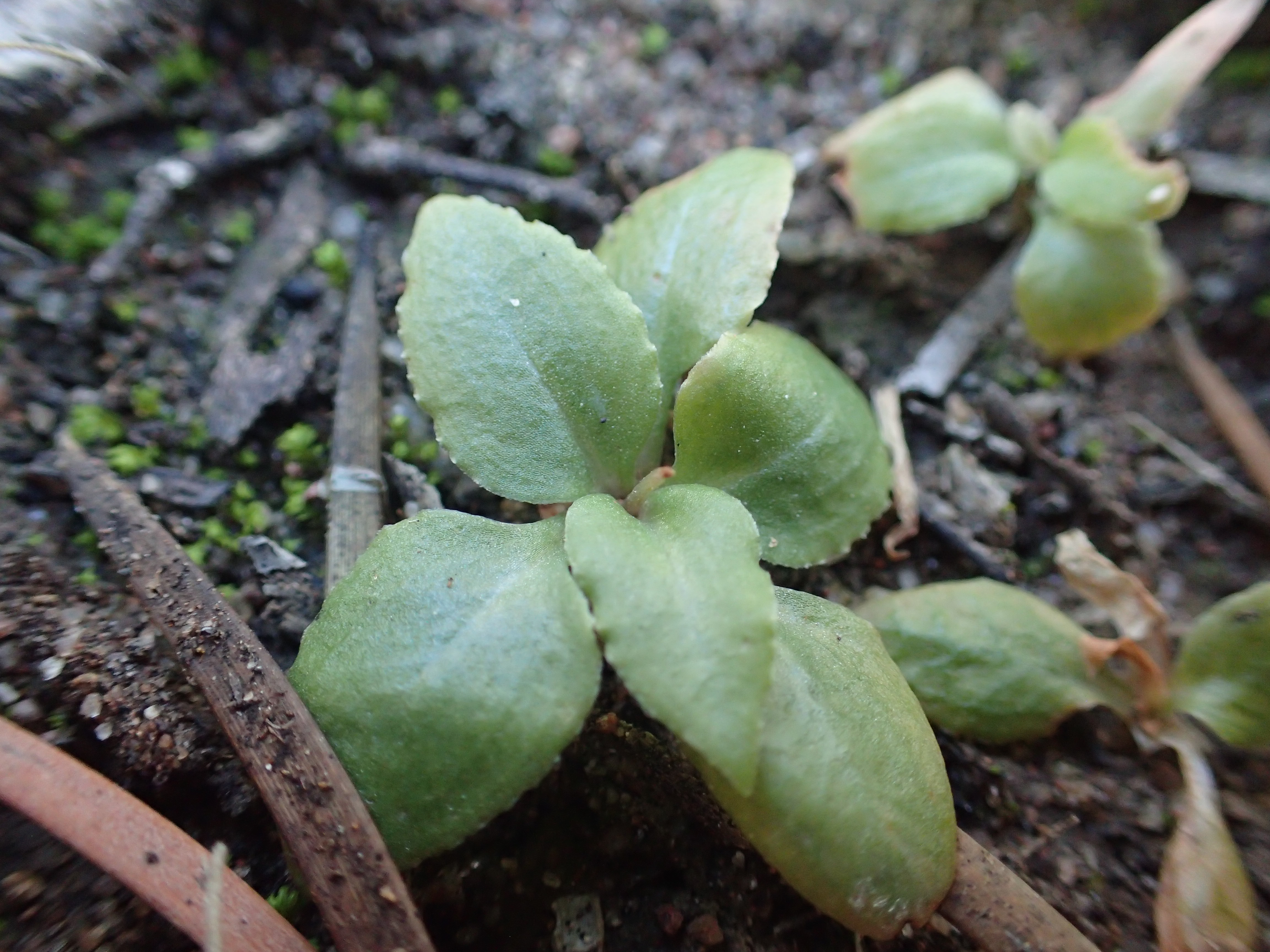
leaf rostte of non-flowering plant

== Description ==
Pterostylis scitula is a terrestrial, perennial, deciduous, herb with an underground tuber and when not flowering, a rosette of leaves 20–60 mm (0.8–2 in) in diameter. Flowering plants have a single green and white flower 12–17 mm (0.5–0.7 in) long and 5–8 mm (0.2–0.3 in) wide on a flowering stem 75–200 mm (3–8 in) high. There are between two and four stem leaves 10–22 mm (0.4–0.9 in) long and 4–10 mm (0.2–0.4 in) wide on the flowering stem. The dorsal sepal and petals are fused, forming a hood or "galea" over the column. The lateral sepals are held closely against the galea, fused at their bases and almost closing the front of the flower with erect tips 16–22 mm (0.6–0.9 in) long. The labellum is small, narrow and not visible from outside the flower. Flowering occurs from August to September.

== Taxonomy and naming ==
Pterostylis scitula was first formally described in 2015 by David Jones and Christopher French from a specimen collected near Moora and the description was published in Australian Orchid Review. The specific epithet (scitula) is a Latin word meaning "beautiful", "elegant", "handsome" or "pretty" referring to the "neat, elegant flowers".

== Distribution and habitat ==
The elegant snail orchid grows in moist soil in dense scrub between Moora and Mogumber in the Avon Wheatbelt, Jarrah Forest and Swan Coastal Plain biogeographic regions.

== Conservation ==
Pterostylis scitula is listed as "not threatened" by the Government of Western Australia Department of Parks and Wildlife.
