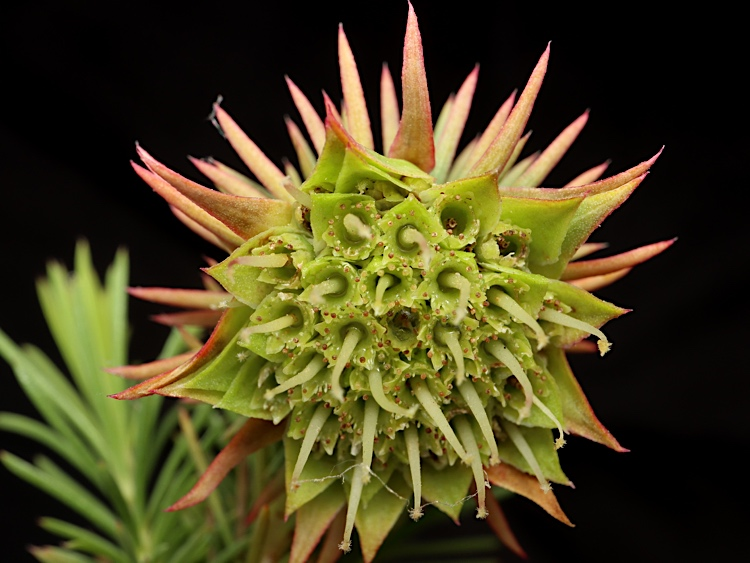
- In the Australian National Botanic Gardens

Conservation status
- Endangered (EPBC Act)

Scientific classification
- Kingdom: Plantae
- Clade: Tracheophytes
- Clade: Angiosperms
- Clade: Eudicots
- Clade: Rosids
- Order: Myrtales
- Family: Myrtaceae
- Genus: Darwinia
- Species: D. acerosa

Binomial name
- Darwinia acerosa W.Fitzg.
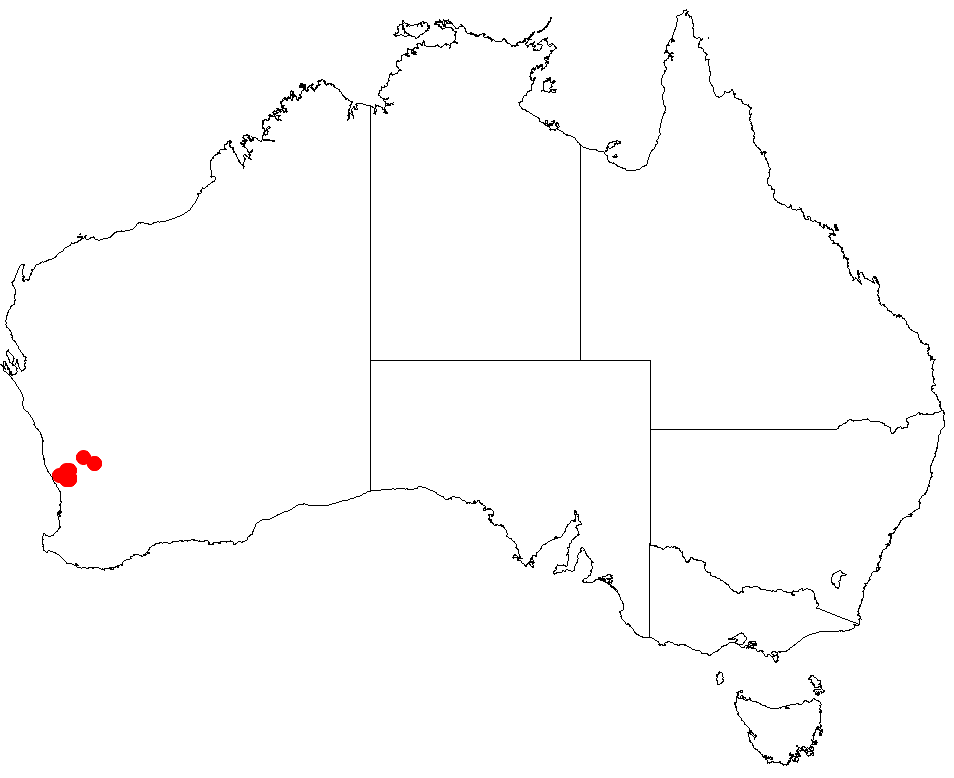
- Occurrence data from AVH

= Darwinia acerosa =

Species of flowering plant

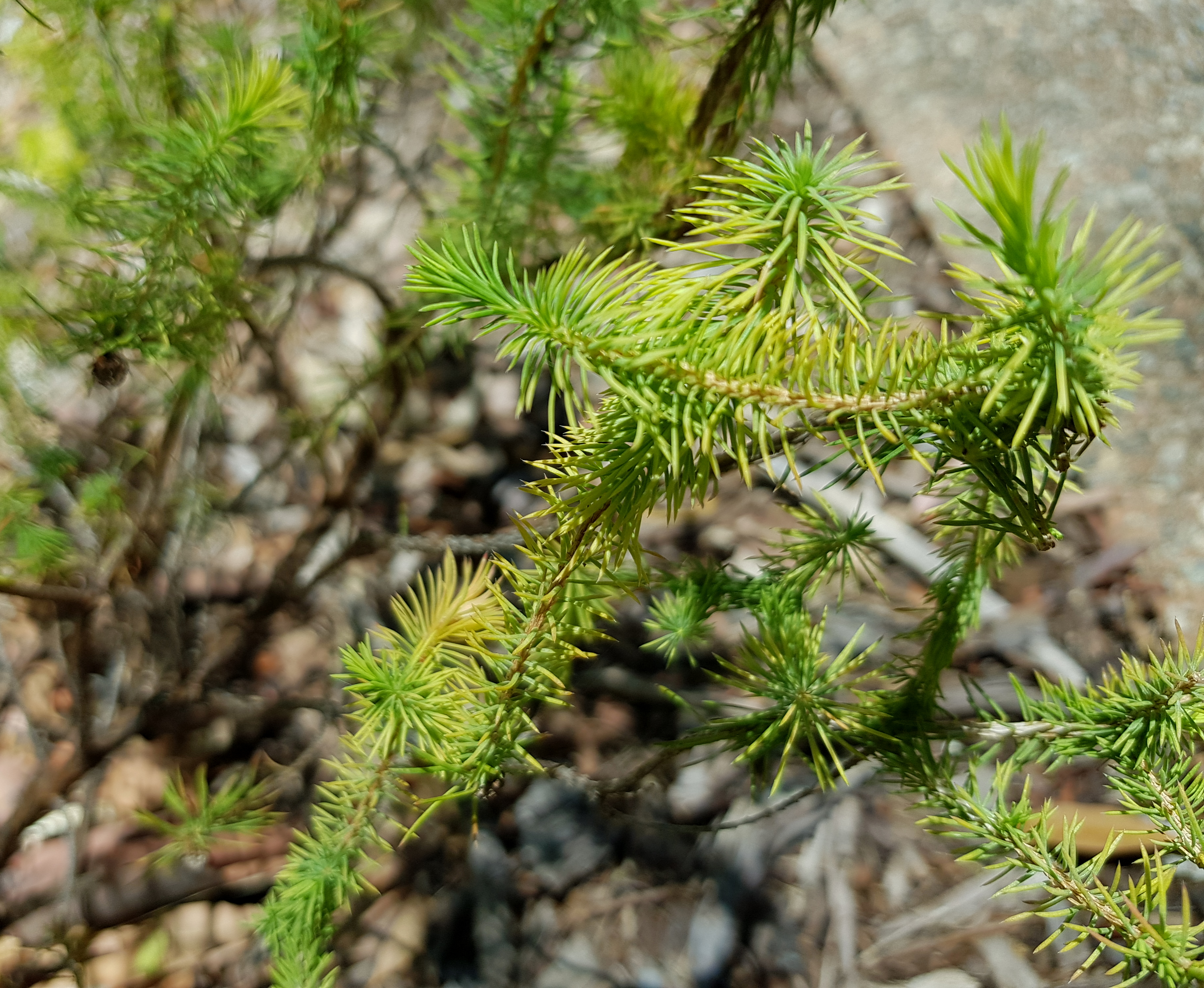
Foliage in Kings Park, Perth

Darwinia acerosa, commonly known as the fine-leaved darwinia, is a plant in the myrtle family Myrtaceae and is endemic to a small area in south-west of Western Australia. It is a densely branched, heath-like shrub with crowded, finely pointed leaves and drooping heads of forty to fifty yellowish-green flowers.

== Description ==
Darwinia acerosa is a spreading, densely-branched, heath-like shrub with whitish branches which grows to a height of 30–50 centimetres (10–20 in). It has crowded, finely-pointed leaves which are about 1 centimetre (0.4 in) long, 1 millimetre (0.04 in) wide, triangular in cross-section and often have a hooked tip. The flowers are arranged in drooping, hemispherical heads of 40 to 50 greenish-yellow flowers. The heads are about 1.5 centimetres (0.6 in) in diameter and are surrounded by rows of green bracts that are longer than the flowers.

== Taxonomy ==
The first formal description of Darwinia acerosa was published by William Vincent Fitzgerald in 1904 in the Journal of the West Australian Natural History Society from specimens he collected near Mogumber in 1903. The specific epithet (acerosa) means "needle-shaped".

== Distribution and habitat ==
This darwinia is only known from three populations in the Mogumber area and four in the Perth area, totalling about five thousand plants. It grows in scrub and heath on and around granite outcrops.

== Conservation ==
Darwinia acerosa is classified as "Threatened Flora (Declared Rare Flora — Extant)" by the Western Australian Government Department of Parks and Wildlife is also listed as "Endangered" (EN) under the Australian Government Environment Protection and Biodiversity Conservation Act 1999 (EPBC Act). The main threats to its survival are dieback caused by Phytophthora cinnamomi, weed invasion, grazing and frequent fires.
