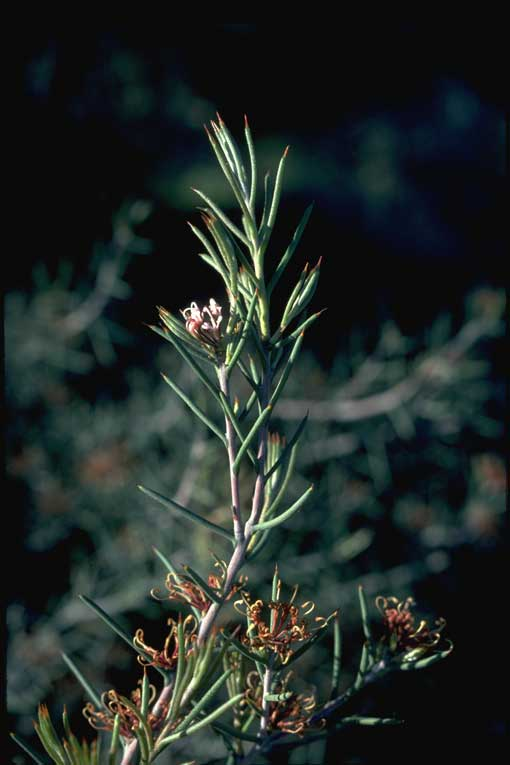
- Hakea circumalata growing near Tammin

Scientific classification
- Kingdom: Plantae
- Clade: Tracheophytes
- Clade: Angiosperms
- Clade: Eudicots
- Order: Proteales
- Family: Proteaceae
- Genus: Hakea
- Species: H. circumalata

Binomial name
- Hakea circumalata Meisn.
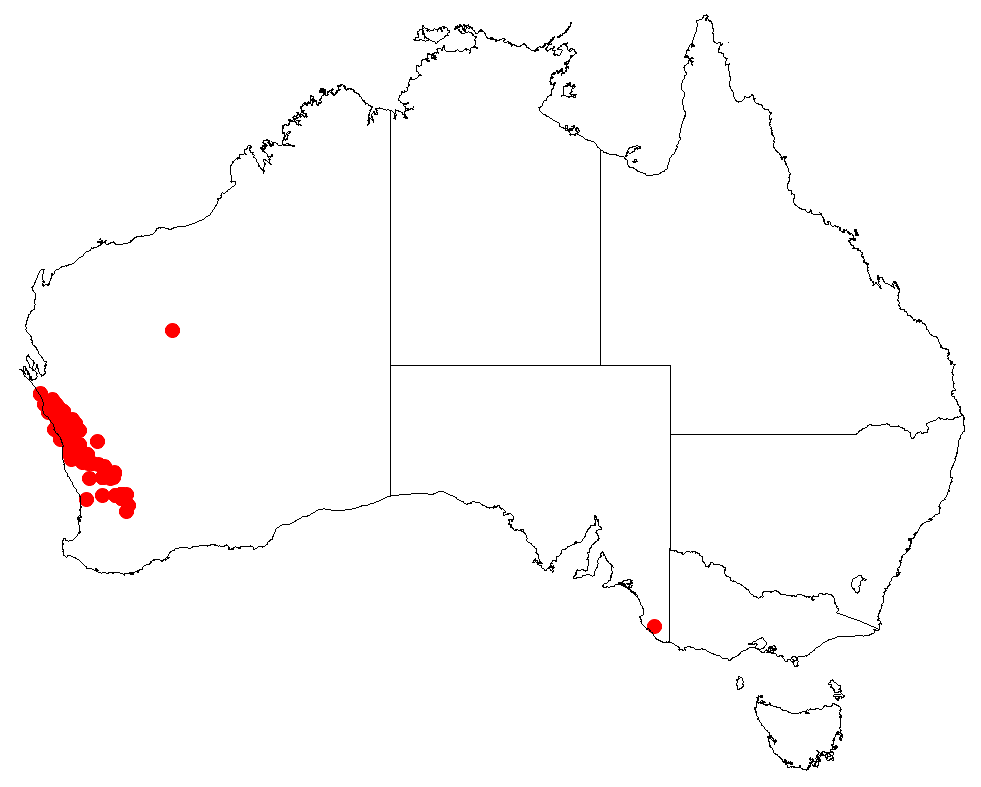
- Occurrence data from AVH

= Hakea circumalata =

Species of shrub native to Western Australia

Hakea circumalata is a shrub in the family Proteaceae native to an area in the Wheatbelt and Mid West regions of Western Australia. A small shrub producing a profusion of strongly scented pink to red flowers in dense clusters from July to September.

== Description ==
Hakea circumulata is a non lignotuberous compact or low open shrub typically growing to a height of 0.6 to 1.5 metres (2.0 to 4.9 ft). Smaller branches are densely covered with short, soft, flattened rusty coloured hairs. The rigid needle-shaped leaves are 1–5 cm (0.39–2.0 in) long and 0.9–1.7 mm (0.035–0.067 in) wide. The leaves grow upright, slightly tapering with a very sharp point at the apex. The inflorescence consists of 6–12 strongly scented white, pink or reddish brown clusters of flowers. Inflorescence are supported on a stem 1.5–2 mm (0.059–0.079 in) long covered in long soft hairs. The bracts surrounding the flowers are 3–5 mm (0.12–0.20 in) long. The pedicels are 2.5–7 mm (0.098–0.28 in) long with white hairs, occasionally with glands on the tips. The white and pink perianth are smooth or having coarse longish hairs. The style is 8–11.5 mm (0.31–0.45 in) long. Flowers appear in leaf axils on the smaller branches from July to September. Fruit are erect on the stem, egg-shaped and often solitary ending in two prominent horns. The surface is smooth in between the many small rounded protuberances. The fruit have two winged, silky, dark brown seeds and are retained on the shrub.

== Taxonomy and naming ==
Hakea circumalata was first formally described by botanist Carl Meisner in 1855 and the description was published in Hooker's Journal of Botany and Kew Garden Miscellany. The specific epithet (circumalata) is derived from the Latin word circum meaning "around" and alatus meaning "winged" referring to the seed which is surrounded by a wing.

== Distribution and habitat ==
Hakea circumalata grows from Shark Bay ranging south through to Wongan Hills and Corrigin. It grows on clay, deep sand and sand with lateritic gravel in heath and low woodland. Requires full sun and a well-drained site. An ornamental species that tolerates moderate frosts. A good wildlife habitat due to its prickly dense growth habit.

== Conservation status ==
Hakea circumalata is classified as "not threatened" by the Western Australian government Department of Parks and Wildlife.
