= Acacia ridleyana =

Conservation status
- Priority Three — Poorly Known Taxa (DEC)

Scientific classification
- Kingdom: Plantae
- Clade: Tracheophytes
- Clade: Angiosperms
- Clade: Eudicots
- Clade: Rosids
- Order: Fabales
- Family: Fabaceae
- Subfamily: Caesalpinioideae
- Clade: Mimosoid clade
- Genus: Acacia
- Species: A. ridleyana

Binomial name
- Acacia ridleyana W.Fitzg.
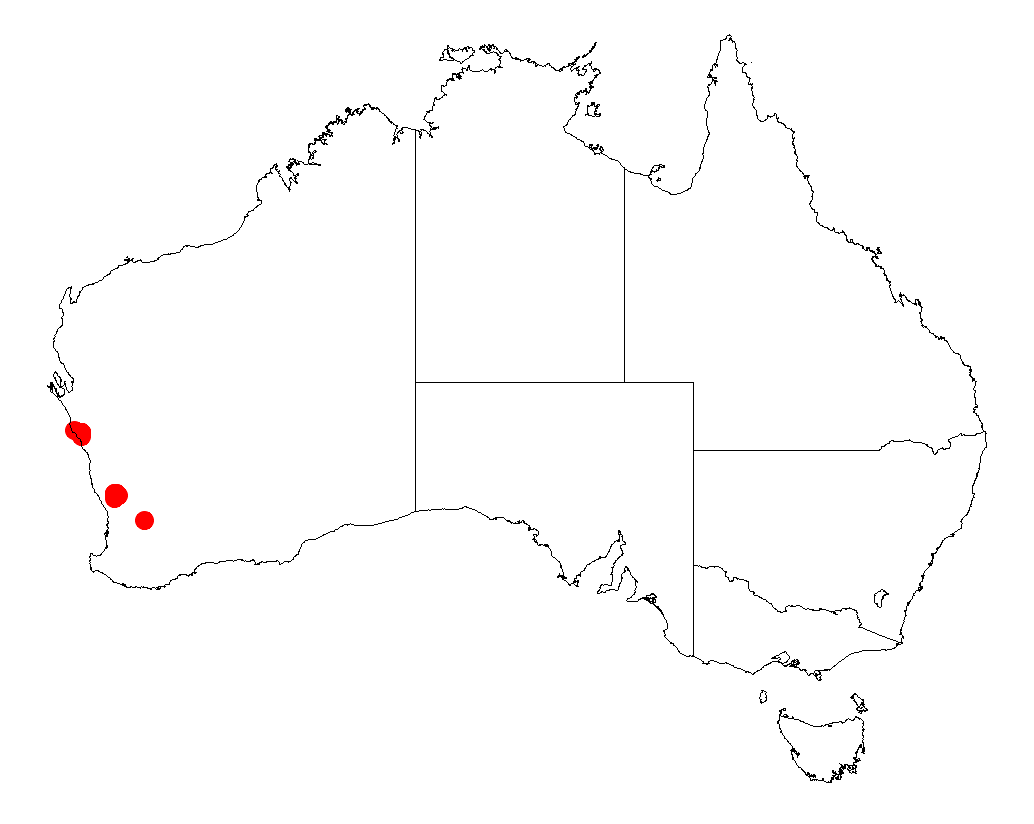
- Occurrence data from AVH

Species of legume

Acacia ridleyana is a shrub of the genus Acacia and the subgenus Plurinerves that is endemic to an area of western Australia.

== Description ==
The spreading and sprawling shrub typically grows to a height of 0.2 to 0.9 metres (1 to 3 ft) and has hairy branchlets with persistent stipules that have a narrowly triangular shape with a length up to around 2.5 mm (0.098 in). Like most species of Acacia it has phyllodes rather than true leaves. The leathery evergreen phyllodes have a narrowly oblong to linear-oblanceolate shape and are curved in a "S" shape or occasionally straight. The phyllodes are 12 to 25 mm (0.47 to 0.98 in) in length and 2 to 3.5 mm (0.079 to 0.138 in) wide with three strongly raised and distant nerves on each face. It blooms from August to December and produces yellow flowers. The simple inflorescences occur singly in the axils and have spherical flower-heads with a diameter of 5 to 7 mm (0.20 to 0.28 in) and contain 16 to 30 golden coloured flowers. The curved, rigid and leathery seed pods that form after flowering have a compressed-cylindrical shape with a length up to 5.5 cm (2.2 in) and a diameter of 3.5 to 4 mm (0.14 to 0.16 in) and are longitudinally striated.

== Distribution ==
It has a disjunct and scattered distribution through the Wheatbelt and Mid West regions of Western Australia where it is found growing in clay, loamy or sandy soils. The range of the plant extends from the Murchison River in the north down to Northampton in the south with another population found further south near Mogumber Nature Reserve usually as a part of heathland communities.

== See also ==
- List of Acacia species
