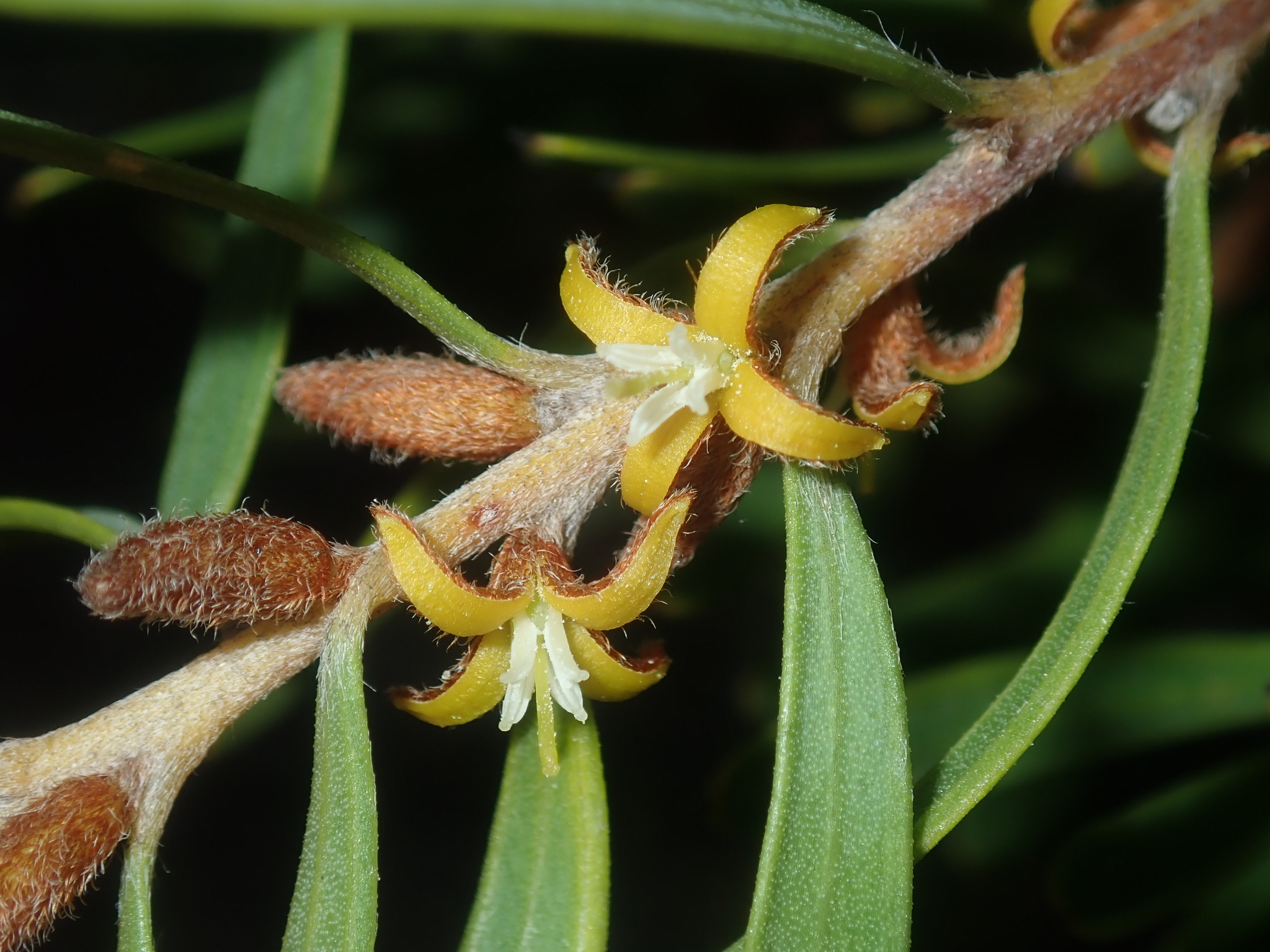

Scientific classification
- Kingdom: Plantae
- Clade: Tracheophytes
- Clade: Angiosperms
- Clade: Eudicots
- Order: Proteales
- Family: Proteaceae
- Genus: Persoonia
- Species: P. rufiflora

Binomial name
- Persoonia rufiflora Meisn.

Synonyms
- Linkia rufiflora (Meisn.) Kuntze; Linkia scabrella (Meisn.) Kuntze; Persoonia scabrella Meisn.

= Persoonia rufiflora =

Species of flowering plant

Persoonia rufiflora is a species of flowering plant in the family Proteaceae and is endemic to the south-west of Western Australia. It is an erect, sometimes spreading shrub with hairy young branchlets, lance-shaped to linear leaves, and hairy, greenish yellow flowers arranged singly or in pairs.

== Description ==
Persoonia rufiflora is an erect, sometimes spreading shrub that typically grows to a height of 0.5–2.5 m (1 ft 8 in – 8 ft 2 in) with young branchlets that are covered with greyish to rust-coloured hair. The leaves are lance-shaped with the narrower end towards the base, to linear, 20–45 mm (0.79–1.77 in) long and 0.7–8 mm (0.028–0.315 in) wide with three ridges on the upper surface. The flowers are arranged singly or in pairs, with a scale leaf at the base. The tepals are greenish yellow, 6.5–10 mm (0.26–0.39 in) long, hairy on the outside, and the anthers are white. Flowering occurs from June to September and the fruit is a smooth, kidney-shaped to oval drupe about 6 mm (0.24 in) long and 2 mm (0.079 in) wide.

== Taxonomy ==
Persoonia rufiflora was first formally described in 1855 by Carl Meissner in Hooker's Journal of Botany and Kew Garden Miscellany from specimens collected by James Drummond.

== Distribution and habitat ==
This geebung grows in heath and mallee woodland between Kalbarri National Park and the Mogumber area in the south-west of Western Australia.

== Conservation status ==
Persoonia rufiflora is classified as "not threatened" by the Government of Western Australia Department of Parks and Wildlife.
