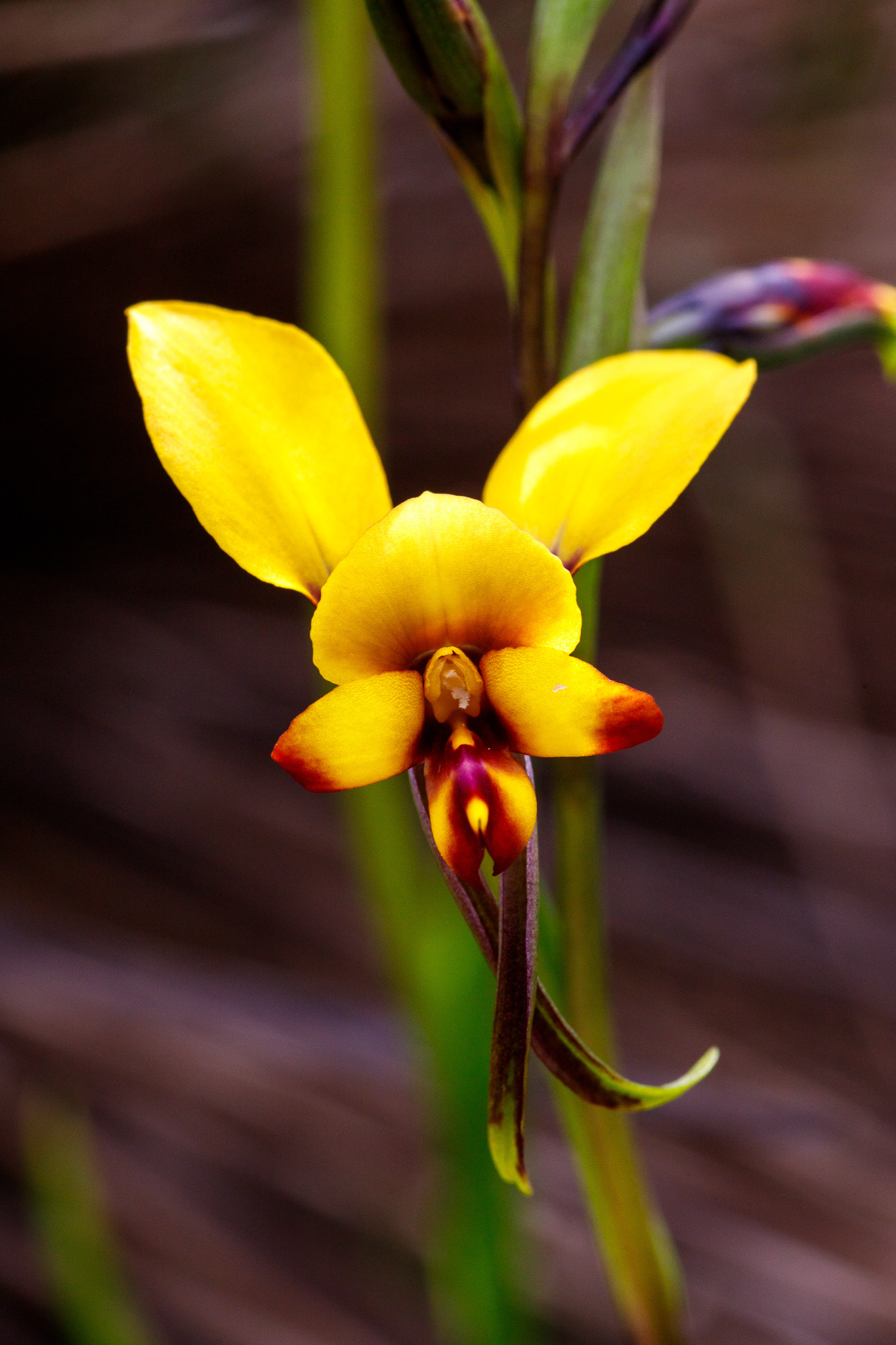
- Near Moore River

Scientific classification
- Kingdom: Plantae
- Clade: Tracheophytes
- Clade: Angiosperms
- Clade: Monocots
- Order: Asparagales
- Family: Orchidaceae
- Subfamily: Orchidoideae
- Tribe: Diurideae
- Genus: Diuris
- Species: D. perialla

Binomial name
- Diuris perialla D.L.Jones & C.J.French

= Diuris perialla =

Species of orchid

Diuris perialla, commonly known as early donkey orchid, is a species of orchid that is endemic to the south-west of Western Australia. It has two or three linear to lance-shaped leaves and up to four yellow flowers with reddish markings.

== Description ==
Diuris perialla is a tuberous, perennial herb with two or three linear to lance-shaped, bright green leaves 50–200 mm (2.0–7.9 in) long and 3–7 mm (0.12–0.28 in) wide. Up to four yellow flowers with reddish markings, 25–40 mm (0.98–1.57 in) long and 20–30 mm (0.79–1.18 in) wide are borne on a flowering stem 150–350 mm (5.9–13.8 in) tall. The dorsal sepal is egg-shaped, 8–10 mm (0.31–0.39 in) long and 3–4 mm (0.12–0.16 in) wide, the lateral sepals narrowly oblong, down-turned and crossed with curved tips, 13–20 mm (0.51–0.79 in) long and 3.0–3.5 mm (0.12–0.14 in) wide. The petals are elliptic, 12–14 mm (0.47–0.55 in) long and 8–10 mm (0.31–0.39 in) wide on a stalk 3–6 mm (0.12–0.24 in) long. The labellum is 6–9 mm (0.24–0.35 in) long with three lobes - the centre lobe broadly wedge-shaped, 6–8 mm (0.24–0.31 in) long and 8–9 mm (0.31–0.35 in) wide, the side lobes spread widely apart and oblong to egg-shaped, 8–10 mm (0.31–0.39 in) long and 4–6 mm (0.16–0.24 in) wide. There is a single smooth, yellow callus ridge 4–5 mm (0.16–0.20 in) long, along the mid-line of the labellum. Flowering occurs from late May to Mid July.

== Taxonomy and naming ==
Diuris perialla was first formally described in 2012 by David Jones and Christopher J. French in Australian Orchid Review, from a specimen collected by French in 1998. The specific epithet (perialla) means "before all others", referring to the species' early flowering.

== Distribution and habitat ==
Early donkey orchid grows in low, shrubby heathland on laterite breakaways, in the area between Regans Ford, Mogumber, Northampton and Mingenew in the Avon Wheatbelt, Geraldton Sandplains, Jarrah Forest and Swan Coastal Plain bioregions of south-western Western Australia.

== Conservation ==
Diuris perialla is listed as "not threatened" by the Western Australian Government Department of Biodiversity, Conservation and Attractions.
