= Eucalyptus pruiniramis =

Jingymia gum

Conservation status
- Data Deficient (IUCN 3.1)

- Endangered (EPBC Act)

Scientific classification
- Kingdom: Plantae
- Clade: Tracheophytes
- Clade: Angiosperms
- Clade: Eudicots
- Clade: Rosids
- Order: Myrtales
- Family: Myrtaceae
- Genus: Eucalyptus
- Species: E. pruiniramis

Binomial name
- Eucalyptus pruiniramis L.A.S.Johnson & K.D.Hill

Species of eucalyptus

Eucalyptus pruiniramis, commonly known as Jingymia gum or midlands gum is a species of mallee or tree that is endemic to a small area of Western Australia. It usually has rough bark on the lower half of the trunk, smooth bark above, dull green, lance-shaped adult leaves, flower buds in groups of between seven and eleven, white flowers and cylindrical to cup-shaped fruit.

== Description ==
Eucalyptus pruiniramis is a mallee, sometimes a small straggly tree, that typically grows to a height of 2.5–7 m (8 ft 2 in – 23 ft 0 in) and forms a lignotuber. It has smooth greyish or blackish bark, usually with rough fibrous bark on the lower half of the trunk. Young plants have stems that are square in cross-section and leaves that are greyish green, broadly egg-shaped to round, 45–105 mm (1.8–4.1 in) long and 40–65 mm (1.6–2.6 in) wide. Adult leaves are the same shade of dull green on both sides, lance-shaped, 85–125 mm (3.3–4.9 in) long and 15–33 mm (0.59–1.30 in) wide, tapering to a petiole 15–30 mm (0.59–1.18 in) long. The flower buds are arranged in leaf axils in groups of seven, nine or eleven on a flattened, unbranched peduncle 8–20 mm (0.31–0.79 in) long, the individual buds on pedicels 2–5 mm (0.079–0.197 in) long. Mature buds are broadly spindle-shaped to oval, 11–16 mm (0.43–0.63 in) long and 5–7 mm (0.20–0.28 in) wide with a conical operculum. Flowering occurs in summer and the flowers are white. The fruit is a woody, cylindrical to cup-shaped capsule 8–12 mm (0.31–0.47 in) long and 8–10 mm (0.31–0.39 in) wide with the valves near rim level.

== Taxonomy ==
Eucalyptus pruiniramis was first formally described in 1992 by Lawrie Johnson and Ken Hill in the journal Telopea. The specific epithet (pruiniramis) is from Latin, meaning "rime" or "hoar-frost" and "-of a branch", referring to the white, waxy covering on the branches.

== Distribution and habitat ==
Jingymia mallee grows in low mallee woodland on rocky hillsides between Mogumber and Arrino. It is only known from nine populations with a total of about 58 plants and only one population is in a reserve.

== Conservation status ==
This mallee is listed as "endangered" under the Australian Government Environment Protection and Biodiversity Conservation Act 1999 and as "Threatened Flora (Declared Rare Flora — Extant)" by the Department of Environment and Conservation (Western Australia). The main threats to the species are road and fence maintenance, gravel extraction, grazing and weed infestation.

== See also ==
- List of Eucalyptus species
