= Acacia orbifolia =

Scientific classification
- Kingdom: Plantae
- Clade: Tracheophytes
- Clade: Angiosperms
- Clade: Eudicots
- Clade: Rosids
- Order: Fabales
- Family: Fabaceae
- Subfamily: Caesalpinioideae
- Clade: Mimosoid clade
- Genus: Acacia
- Species: A. orbifolia

Binomial name
- Acacia orbifolia Maiden & Blakely
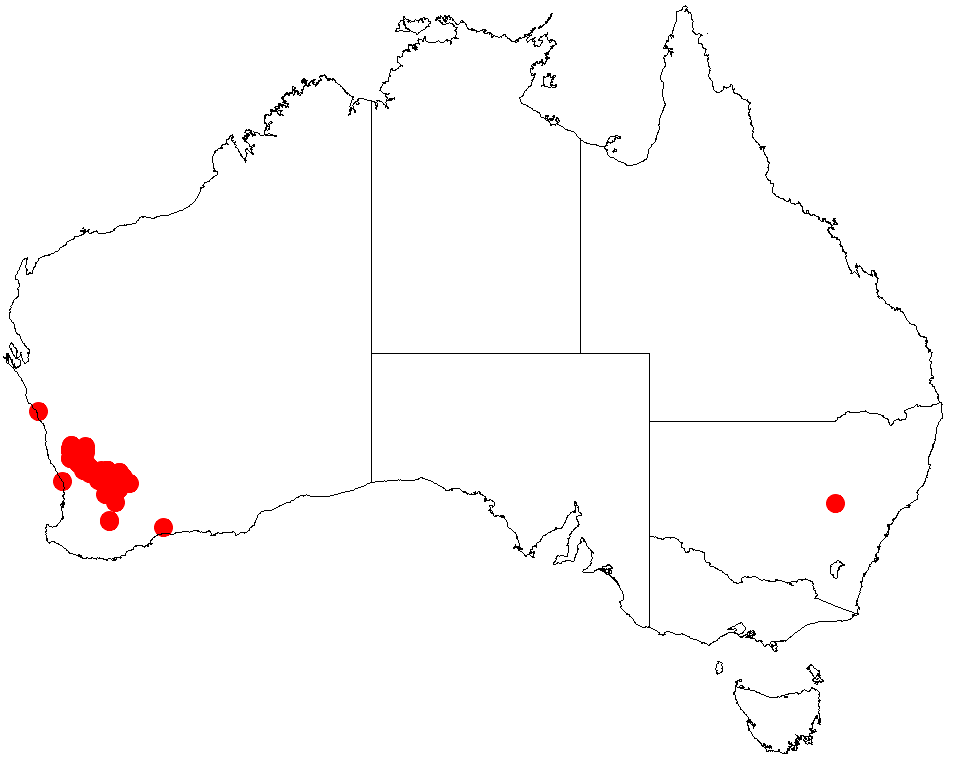
- Occurrence data from AVH

Synonyms
- Racosperma orbifolium (Maiden & Blakely) Pedley

Species of legume

Habit along the Christmas Rock Walk, Wongan Hills

Acacia orbifolia is a species of flowering plant in the family Fabaceae, and is endemic to the south-west of Western Australia. It is a dense, domed shrub with branchlets covered with white, waxy hairs, round to delta-shaped phyllodes, spherical heads of white to cream-coloured flowers and coiled or twisted pods constricted between the seeds.

== Description ==
Acacia orbifolia is dense, domed shrub that typically grows to a height of 0.5–1.9 m (1 ft 8 in – 6 ft 3 in) and 3 m (9.8 ft) in diameter, its branchlets covered with white, waxy hairs. The phyllodes are round to Δ-shaped with the narrower end towards the base, commonly 8–20 mm (0.31–0.79 in), 6–15 mm (0.24–0.59 in) wide, the upper edge rounded, with two fine, divergent, longitudinal veins on each face. The flowers are borne in spherical heads, sometimes in short racemes up to 4 mm (0.16 in) long, on peduncles 10–26 mm (0.39–1.02 in) long. The heads are 5.5–7.5 mm (0.22–0.30 in) in diameter with 20 to 32, usually white to cream-coloured flowers. Flowering occurs from July to September, and the pods are coiled or twisted, up to 20 mm (0.79 in) long, 3–4 mm (0.12–0.16 in) wide, constricted between and raised over the seeds.

== Taxonomy ==
Acacia orbifolia was first formally described in 1927 by Joseph Maiden and William Blakely in the Journal of the Royal Society of Western Australia from specimens collected by Alexander Morrison in Wongan Hills in 1903. The specific epithet (orbifolia) means 'circular-leaved'.

== Distribution and habitat ==
This species of wattle grows in rocky or lateritic clay or loam in Eucalyptus woodland from near Watheroo, south-east to Muntadgin and near Bulyee in the Corrigin shire, with an outlier near Northampton in the Avon Wheatbelt and Geraldton Sandplains bioregions of south-western Western Australia.

== See also ==
- List of Acacia species
