= Acacia aculeiformis =

- Foliage and flower buds

Scientific classification
- Kingdom: Plantae
- Clade: Tracheophytes
- Clade: Angiosperms
- Clade: Eudicots
- Clade: Rosids
- Order: Fabales
- Family: Fabaceae
- Subfamily: Caesalpinioideae
- Clade: Mimosoid clade
- Genus: Acacia
- Species: A. aculeiformis

Binomial name
- Acacia aculeiformis Maslin
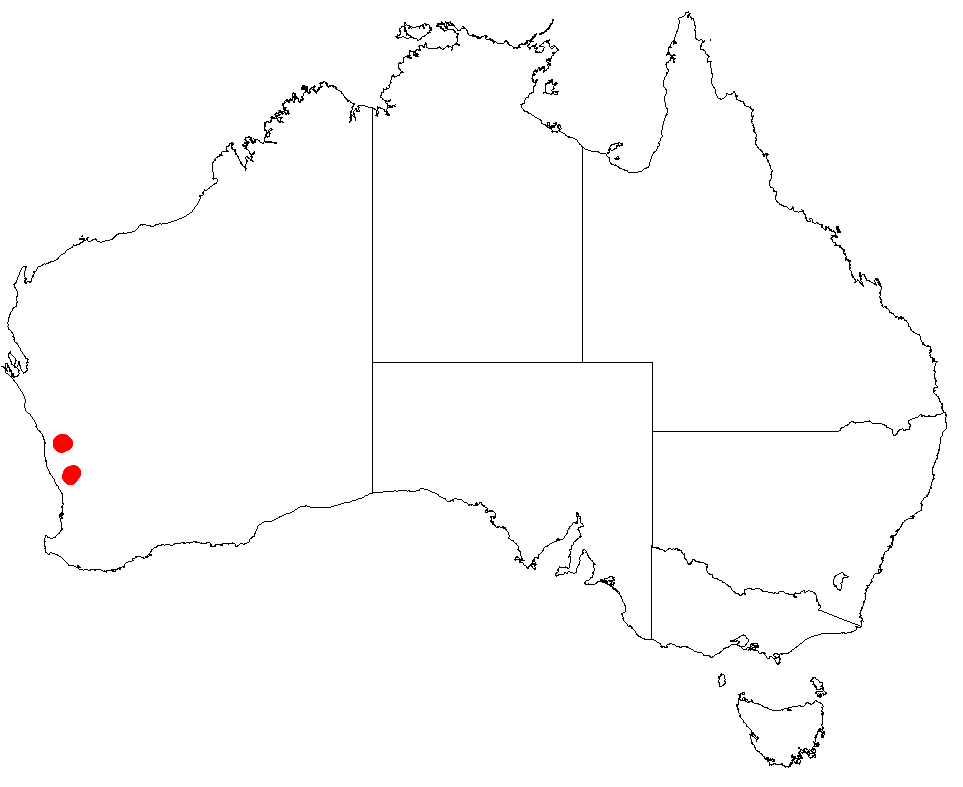
- Occurrence data from AVH

Synonyms
- Racosperma aculeiforme (Maslin) Pedley

Species of legume

Habit in a gravel pit, near Arrino

Acacia aculeiformis is a species of flowering plant in the family Fabaceae and is endemic to the south-west of Western Australia. It is prostrate, scrambling, mat-forming shrub with asymmetrical elliptic to narrowly elliptic phyllodes, and spherical heads of light to medium golden-yellow or yellowish-red flowers.

== Description ==
Acacia aculeiformis is a prostrate, scrambling, mat-forming shrub that has many stems and that typically grows up to 2 m (6 ft 7 in) wide. Its phyllodes are more or less glabrous, asymmetrical elliptic to narrowly elliptic, 10–25 mm (0.39–0.98 in) long, 5–10 mm (0.20–0.39 in) wide with spiny stipules 2.5–4 mm (0.098–0.157 in) long at the base. Between 27 and 39 light to medium golden-yellow or yellowish-red flowers are arranged in 1 or 2 spherical heads 0.5–1 mm (0.020–0.039 in) long on a peduncle 6–17 mm (0.24–0.67 in) long. Flowering has been observed from August to January.

== Taxonomy ==
Acacia aculeiformis was first formally described in 1999 by Bruce Maslin in the journal Nuytsia from specimens he collected 10.5 km (6.5 mi) north of Three Springs in 1983. The specific epithet (aculeiformis) means "prickle-shaped" and refers to the stipules.

== Distribution and habitat ==
This species of wattle occurs in scattered locations from Mogumber and Three Springs in gravelly soils on rocky rises, breakaways and hills in the Avon Wheatbelt, Jarrah Forest and Swan Coastal Plain bioregions of south-western Western Australia.

== See also ==
- List of Acacia species
