= Bullaring, Western Australia =

Bullaring
- Town
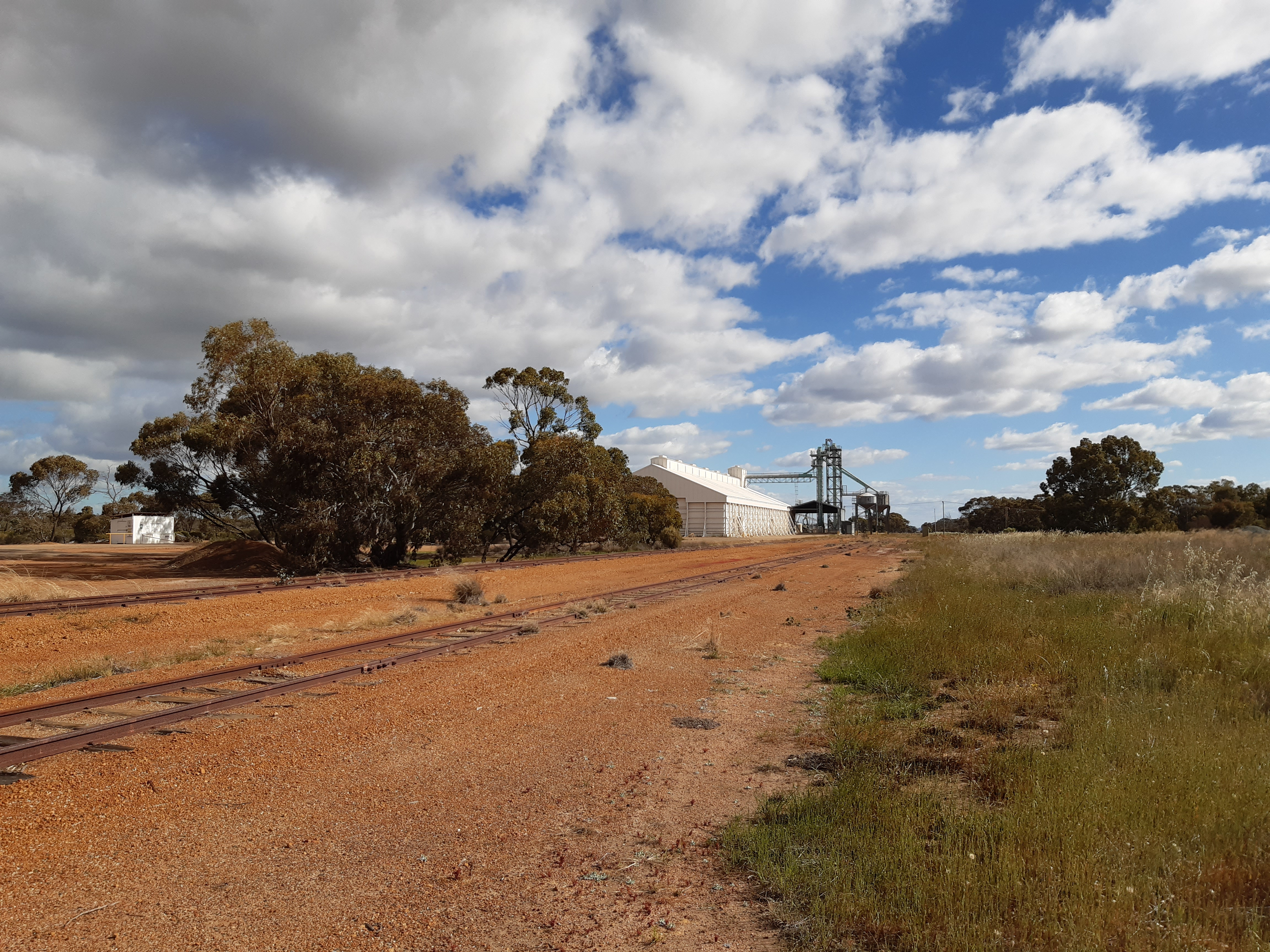
- Bullaring grain receival point

- Coordinates: 32°30′S 117°44′E
- Country: Australia
- State: Western Australia
- LGA(s): Shire of Corrigin
- Location: 232 km (144 mi) east south east of Perth; 22 km (14 mi) south south west of Corrigin; 39 km (24 mi) north west of Wickepin

Government
  - State electorate(s): Central Wheatbelt
  - Federal division(s): O'Connor

Area
  - Total: 559.1 km^{2} (215.9 sq mi)
- Elevation: 286 m (938 ft)

Population
  - Total(s): 82 (SAL 2021)
- Postcode: 6373

Bullaring is a small town located in the Shire of Corrigin in the Wheatbelt region of Western Australia.

The townsite was gazetted in 1914 and is situated along the railway line between Corrigin and Wickepin.

The name is Aboriginal in origin and comes from the name of a spring that is found close to town, but the meaning of the word is unknown.

The main industry in town is wheat farming, with the town being a Cooperative Bulk Handling receival site.
