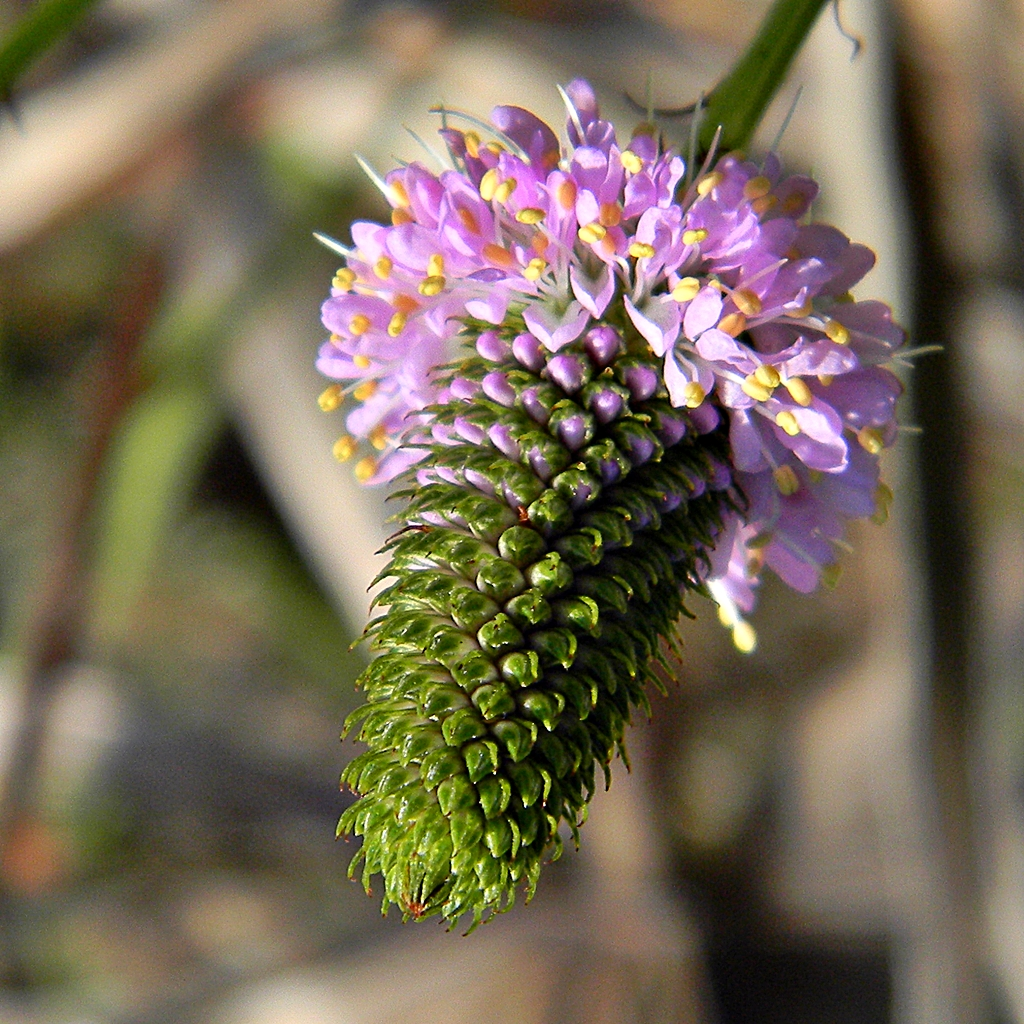

Conservation status
- Secure (NatureServe)

Scientific classification
- Kingdom: Plantae
- Clade: Tracheophytes
- Clade: Angiosperms
- Clade: Eudicots
- Clade: Rosids
- Order: Fabales
- Family: Fabaceae
- Subfamily: Faboideae
- Genus: Dalea
- Species: D. carnea

Binomial name
- Dalea carnea (Michx.) Poir.

Varieties
- Dalea carnea var. albida (Torr. & A.Gray) Barneby; Dalea carnea var. carnea

Synonyms
- Kuhnistera carnea (Michx.) Kuntze; Petalostemon carneus Michx.; Psoralea carnea (Michx.) Poir.; synonyms of var. albida: Dalea albida (Torr. & A.Gray) D.B.Ward; Petalostemon albidus (Torr. & A.Gray) Small; Petalostemon carneus var. albidus Torr. & A.Gray; synonyms of var. carnea: Kuhnistera rosea (Nutt.) Kuntze; Petalostemon roseus Nutt.

= Dalea carnea =

Species of legume

Dalea carnea, commonly known as pink tassels, is a flowering plant species named for its small, pink-to-white flowers. It is also known as whitetassels, pink prairie clover, or hammock prairie clover. The plant is a perennial herb in the family Fabaceae.

This species' range is located within the Atlantic Coastal Plain, stretching from central Georgia south to peninsular Florida. Its habitats include mesic flatwoods, open meadows, and pine rocklands.

Th species was first described as Petalostemon carneus by André Michaux in 1803. In 1819 Jean Louis Marie Poiret placed the species in genus Dalea as D. carnea.
