= Mogumber, Western Australia =

Mogumber
- Town
- Coordinates: 31°02′S 116°02′E
- Country: Australia
- State: Western Australia
- LGA(s): Shire of Victoria Plains

Area
  - Total: 250.6 km^{2} (96.8 sq mi)

Population
  - Total(s): 58 (SAL 2021)
- Postcode: 6506

Mogumber is a locality in Western Australia. It is in the Shire of Victoria Plains, and situated along the Bindoon Moora Road. Although it is a settlement, it is not officially a townsite. It is the location where the Moore River East joins the Moore River. As of the 2021 Australian census, Mogumber had a population of 58.

A grain storage bin was built at Mogumber in 1980 by CBH Group. It was the first of CBH's "Type K" grain storage facility. As of 2020, the grain storage bin is not used.

Mogumber has a tavern.

Mogumber West Nature Reserve is located in Mogumber. The nature reserve surrounds the Moore River. The reserve has an area of 259 square kilometres (100 sq mi). There is also the Mogumber Nature Reserve located just south of the boundary of Mogumber in Mindarra, which is home to the endangered Darwinia carnea, also known as the Mogumber bell.

== See also ==
- Moore River Native Settlement
