= Dalea albida =

Scientific classification
- Kingdom: Plantae
- Clade: Tracheophytes
- Clade: Angiosperms
- Clade: Eudicots
- Clade: Rosids
- Order: Fabales
- Family: Fabaceae
- Subfamily: Faboideae
- Genus: Dalea
- Species: D. albida

Binomial name
- Dalea albida (Torr. & A.Gray) D.B.Ward

Species of flowering plant

Dalea albida is a flowering plant in the Dalea genus. It grows in parts of Alabama, Florida, and Georgia.

A perennial in the family Fabaceae, it produces white flowers. It grows in coastal plain dry sand and pineland habitats. Petalostemon albidus is a synonym.

A specimen was collected in 1968 and photographed.
