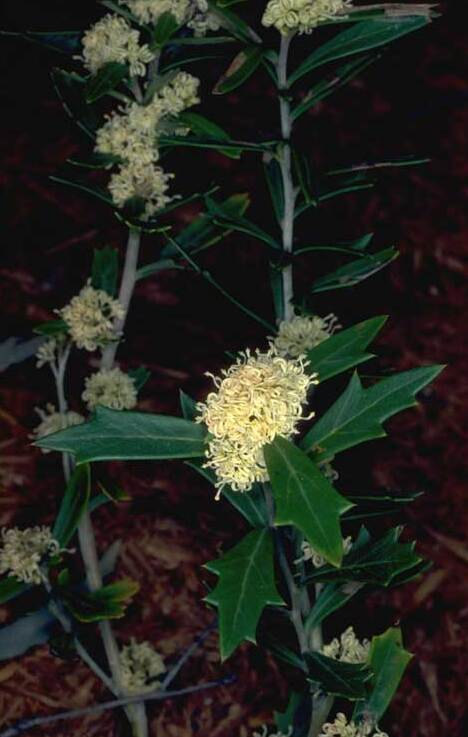
- In the Australian National Botanic Gardens

Conservation status
- Least Concern (IUCN 3.1)

Scientific classification
- Kingdom: Plantae
- Clade: Tracheophytes
- Clade: Angiosperms
- Clade: Eudicots
- Order: Proteales
- Family: Proteaceae
- Genus: Grevillea
- Species: G. muelleri

Binomial name
- Grevillea muelleri Benth.

Synonyms
- Grevillea trifida 'Stirling Range form'

= Grevillea muelleri =

Species of shrub endemic to Western Australia

Grevillea muelleri is a species of flowering plant in the family Proteaceae and is endemic to the a relatively small area of south-western Western Australia. It is a shrub with linear to narrowly oblong, or divided leaves with linear or narrowly egg-shaped lobes, more or less spherical clusters of white to cream-coloured flowers.

== Description ==
Grevillea muelleri is a shrub that typically grows to a height of 20–40 cm (7.9–15.7 in) and has silky-hairy branchlets. Its adult leaves are 25–100 mm (0.98–3.94 in) long, linear to narrowly oblong or narrowly lance-shaped, sometimes with a few irregular teeth and 2–5 mm (0.079–0.197 in) wide, sometimes divided and 3–17 mm (0.12–0.67 in) wide. Leaves on flowering stems are usually narrower and shorter with fewer lobes. The flowers are white to cream-coloured, usually near the ends of branches, sometimes branched, in more or less spherical clusters 10 mm (0.39 in) long on a rachis 0.2–0.5 mm (0.0079–0.0197 in), the pistil 5–6 mm (0.20–0.24 in) long. Flowering occurs from June to September and the fruit is an egg-shaped to elliptic follicle 7.5–9.5 mm (0.30–0.37 in) long.

== Taxonomy ==
Grevillea muelleri was first formally described in 1870 by George Bentham in Flora Australiensis from specimens collected by Ferdinand von Mueller at the summit of the Stirling Range. The specific epithet (muelleri) honours the collector of the type specimens.

== Distribution and habitat ==
This grevillea grows in forest and tall shrubland and is mainly restricted to the Stirling Range National Park in the Esperance Plains, Jarrah Forest and Mallee bioregions of south-western Western Australia.

== See also ==
- List of Grevillea species
