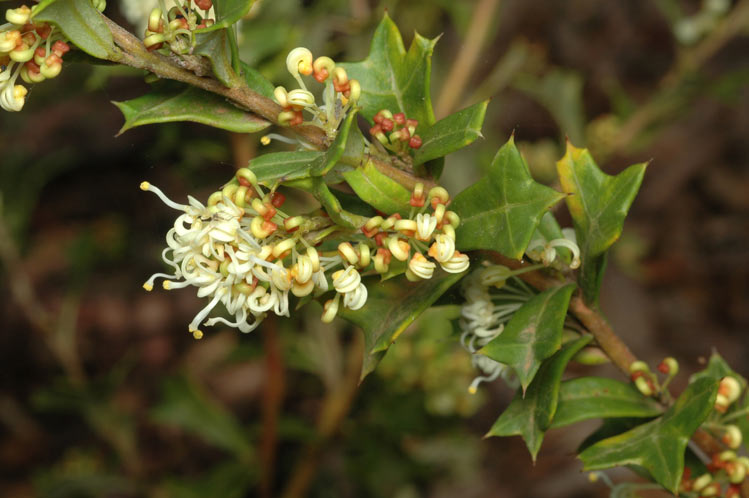
- In the Australian National Botanic Gardens

Scientific classification
- Kingdom: Plantae
- Clade: Tracheophytes
- Clade: Angiosperms
- Clade: Eudicots
- Order: Proteales
- Family: Proteaceae
- Genus: Grevillea
- Species: G. trifida

Binomial name
- Grevillea trifida (R.Br.) Meisn.

Synonyms
- Anadenia trifida R.Br.; Grevillea brevicuspis Meisn.

= Grevillea trifida =

Species of shrub endemic to Western Australia

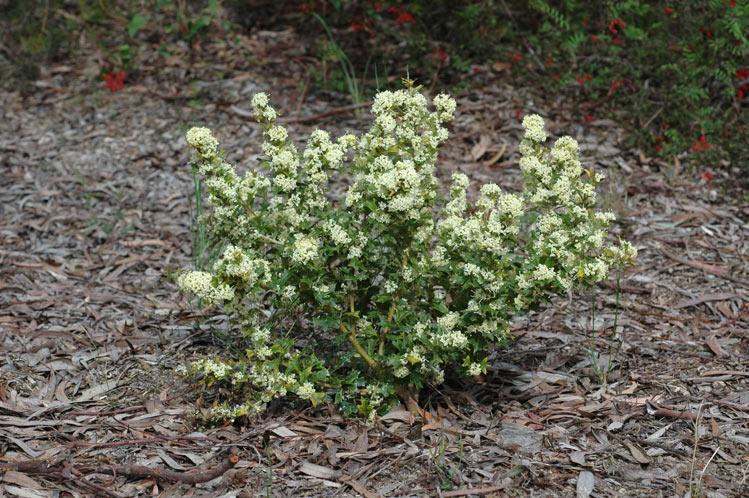
Habit

Grevillea trifida is species of flowering plant in the family Proteaceae and is endemic to the southwest of Western Australia. It is a spiny, erect to low spreading shrub, usually with divided, variably-shaped leaves, and clusters of white to cream-coloured flowers.

== Description ==
Grevillea trifida is a spiny, erect to low, spreading shrub that typically grows to a height of 0.3–1.7 m (1 ft 0 in – 5 ft 7 in), its branchlets silky-hairy. The leaves are usually divided, 20–70 mm (0.79–2.76 in) long, sometimes linear to elliptic with 5 to 9 triangular teeth on the edges, or wedge-shaped with 3 to 5 lobes, the end lobes triangular to linear, 2–20 mm (0.079–0.787 in) long, 1–4 mm (0.039–0.157 in) wide. The leaf lobes are sharply pointed, and the edges of the leaves turned down to rolled under without concealing the lower surface. The flowers are arranged in leaf axils or on the ends of branches, in sometimes branched clusters, the clusters umbel-like on a woolly-hairy rachis 0.2–0.5 mm (0.0079–0.0197 in) long, the flowers nearer the tip of the rachis flowering first. The flowers are white to cream-coloured, the pistil 5.0–7.5 mm (0.20–0.30 in) long. Flowering mainly occurs from July to November, and the fruit is an oval to elliptic follicle 7.5–9.5 mm (0.30–0.37 in) long.

== Taxonomy ==
This species was first formally described in 1810 by Robert Brown who gave it the name Anadenia trifida in Transactions of the Linnean Society of London. In 1845, Carl Meissner transferred it to the genus Grevillea as G. trifida in Lehmann's Plantae Preissianae.

The specific epithet (trifida) means "three-forked", referring to the leaves.

== Distribution and habitat ==
Grevillea trifida grows in sandy or gravelly soils in jarrah forest, shrubland and in swampy places. It is widespread from Cape Naturaliste to near the Stirling Range in the Avon Wheatbelt, Esperance Plains, Jarrah Forest, Mallee, Swan Coastal Plain and Warren bioregions of south-western Western Australia.

== See also ==
- List of Grevillea species
