= Corrigin, Western Australia =

Town in the Wheatbelt region of Western Australia

Corrigin
- Town
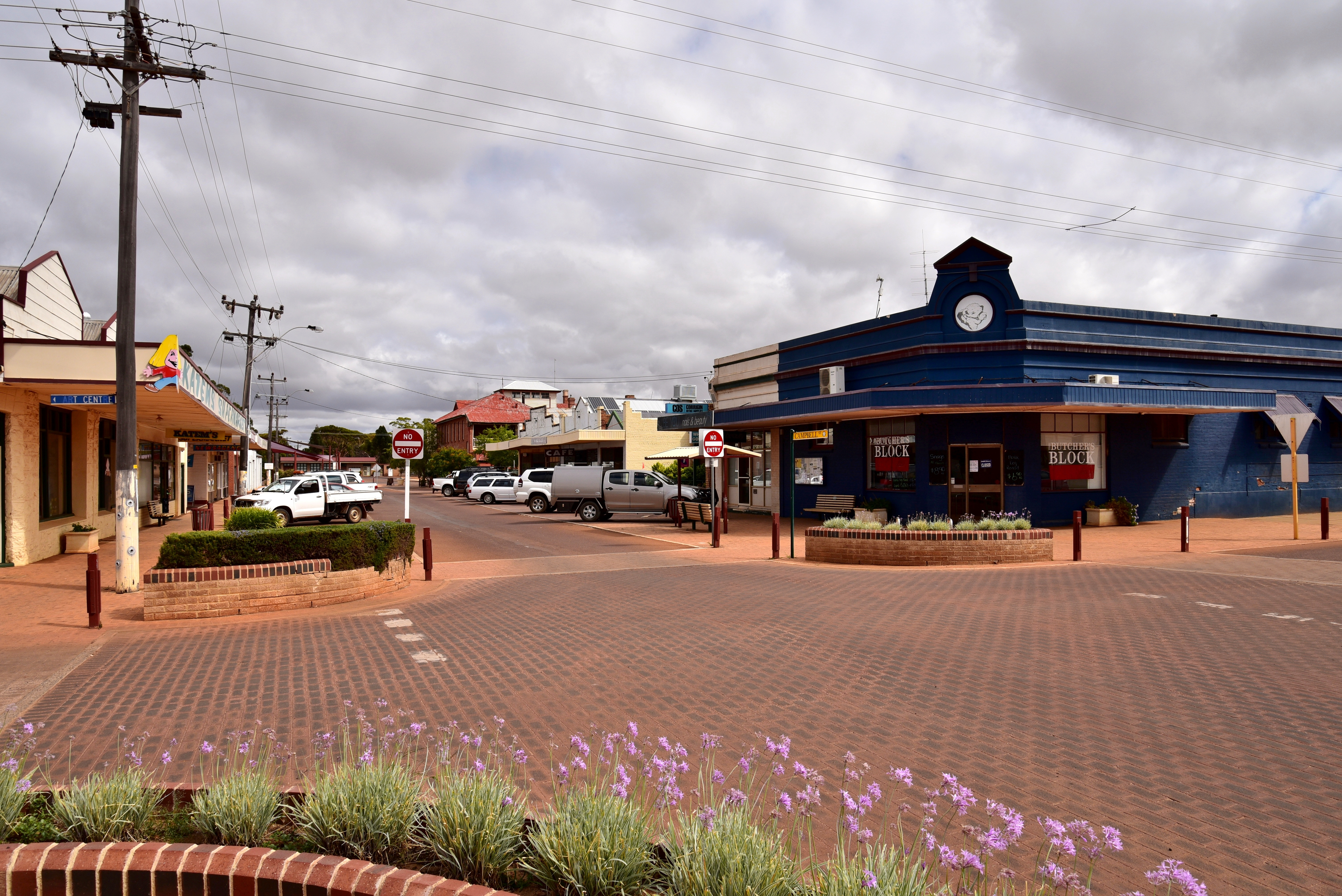
- Campbell Street, Corrigin, 2018

- Interactive map of Corrigin
- Coordinates: 32.33°S 117.88°E
- Country: Australia
- State: Western Australia
- Region: Wheatbelt
- LGA: Shire of Corrigin
- Location: 229 km (142 mi) from Perth
- Established: 1900s

Government
  - State electorate: Central Wheatbelt
  - Federal division: O'Connor

Area
  - Total: 393.6 km^{2} (152.0 sq mi)
- Elevation: 295 m (968 ft)

Population
  - Total: 625 (UCL 2021)
- Postcode: 6375
- Mean max temp: 23.5 °C (74.3 °F)
- Mean min temp: 9.9 °C (49.8 °F)
- Annual rainfall: 375.5 mm (14.78 in)

Corrigin is a town in the central Wheatbelt region of Western Australia, 229 kilometres (142 mi) east-southeast of the state capital, Perth, Western Australia, along State Route 40. It is mostly a farming community focused on crops and sheep, and holds the world record of "the most dogs in a ute".

== History ==
The name "Corrigin", of Noongar Aboriginal origin, was first recorded in 1877 relating to a well in the area. The meaning of the name is unknown.

Before 1908 Corrigin's only connection with the rest of the state was the railway track that ran to Merredin and it was difficult to get anyone to take up land near the rabbit proof fence. Most of the land was once held by George Walton on a pastoral lease, which he ran from his homestead at Wogerlin rock. The first settlers to the area were Mr A. W. Goyder (the son of the South Australian Surveyor General), who took up the area on which the town now stands. He was followed by Jack Crossland then by Messrs Gayfer and Jose Bros.

In 1909, the Government planned to build a railway from Brookton on the Great Southern Railway to the town of Kunjin, 17 km west of Corrigin. Some time after, a line from Wickepin was also proposed, and the Government decided to locate the crossing point at Corrigin.

A storm swept through the area in 1913 lashing the area with hailstones over 30 mm (1 in) in diameter. The town was also deluged with over 89 mm (3.5 in) of rain in a few hours. Standing crops were flattened, fences in low-lying areas were washed away and most of the town was submerged under at least 61 cm (2 ft) of water.

In 1913, a railway siding was built, and named "Dondakin" by railway authorities due to conflict with the name elsewhere. However, after much local protest, the siding was renamed Corrigin and gazetted on 15 May 1914. The railway line from Wickepin, Western Australia opened a month later, and the main office of the local Road Board moved to the town. In 1915, a school was built.

In 1932 the Wheat Pool of Western Australia announced that the town would have two grain elevators, each fitted with an engine, installed at the railway siding. The bulk handling facility had been installed by November the following year and the first trial load of wheat was satisfactorily loaded.

By 1937 the town boasted a hall that cost £8,000 to build, a large state hotel, commercial buildings, bowling green, tennis course, golf course and one of the best showgrounds in the state. The town still had no adequate water scheme, there was no lack of well water but the water drawn was very hard.

The wheatbelt was struck by drought for much of 1939 and nearly all of 1940, described at the time as "the worst in the states history" until heavy rains arrived in December of that year. Corrigin received 118 mm (4.63 in) of drought-breaking rain over a couple of days.

The town was lashed by a violent storm on New Year's Day in 2013. Destructive winds and 60 mm (2 in) of rain tore through over the course of an hour leaving behind fallen powerlines, uprooted trees, sheds torn apart and roofs ripped from homes.

== Present day ==
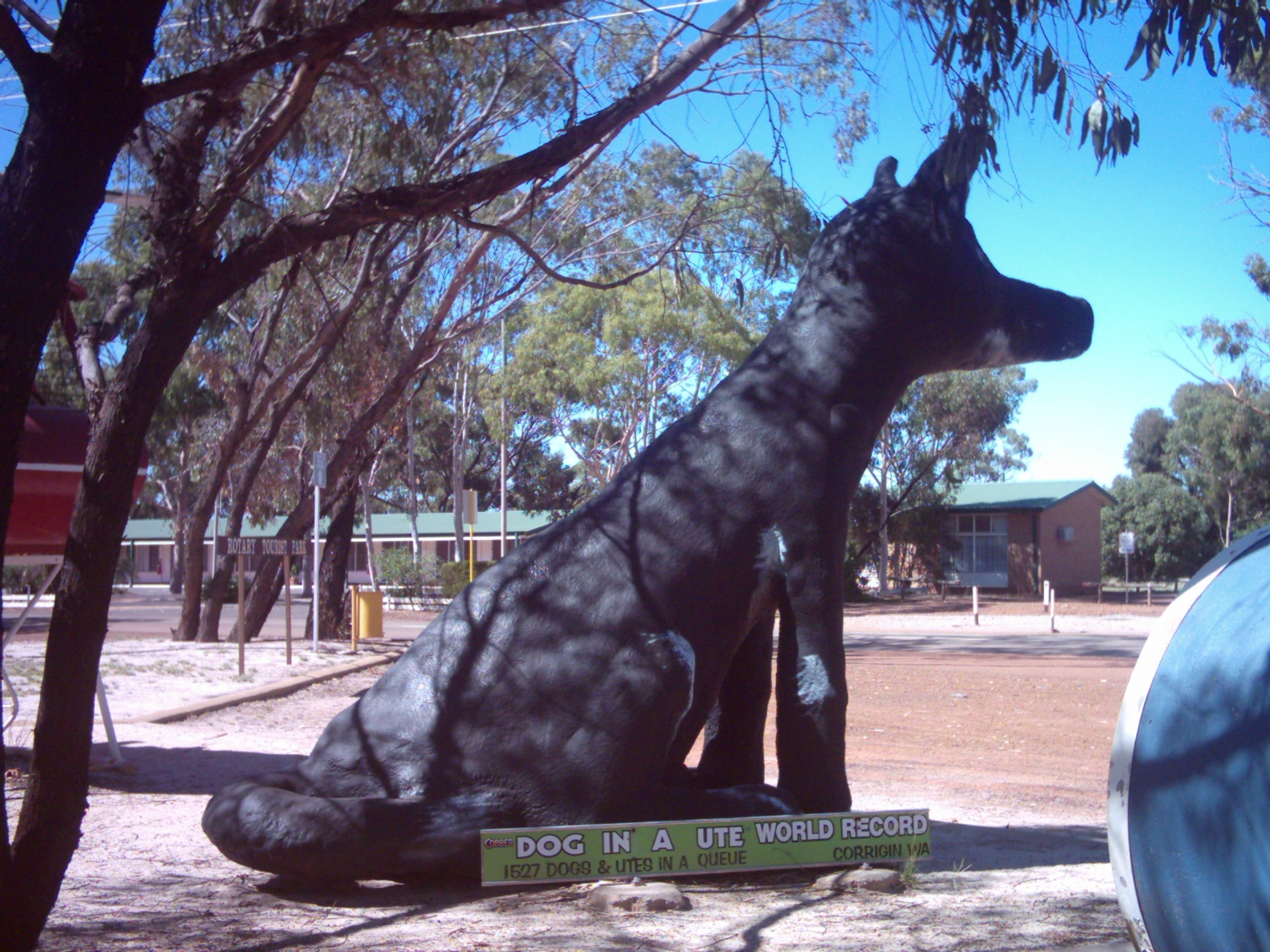
Statue to acknowledge the world record convoy of 1527 utes with dogs

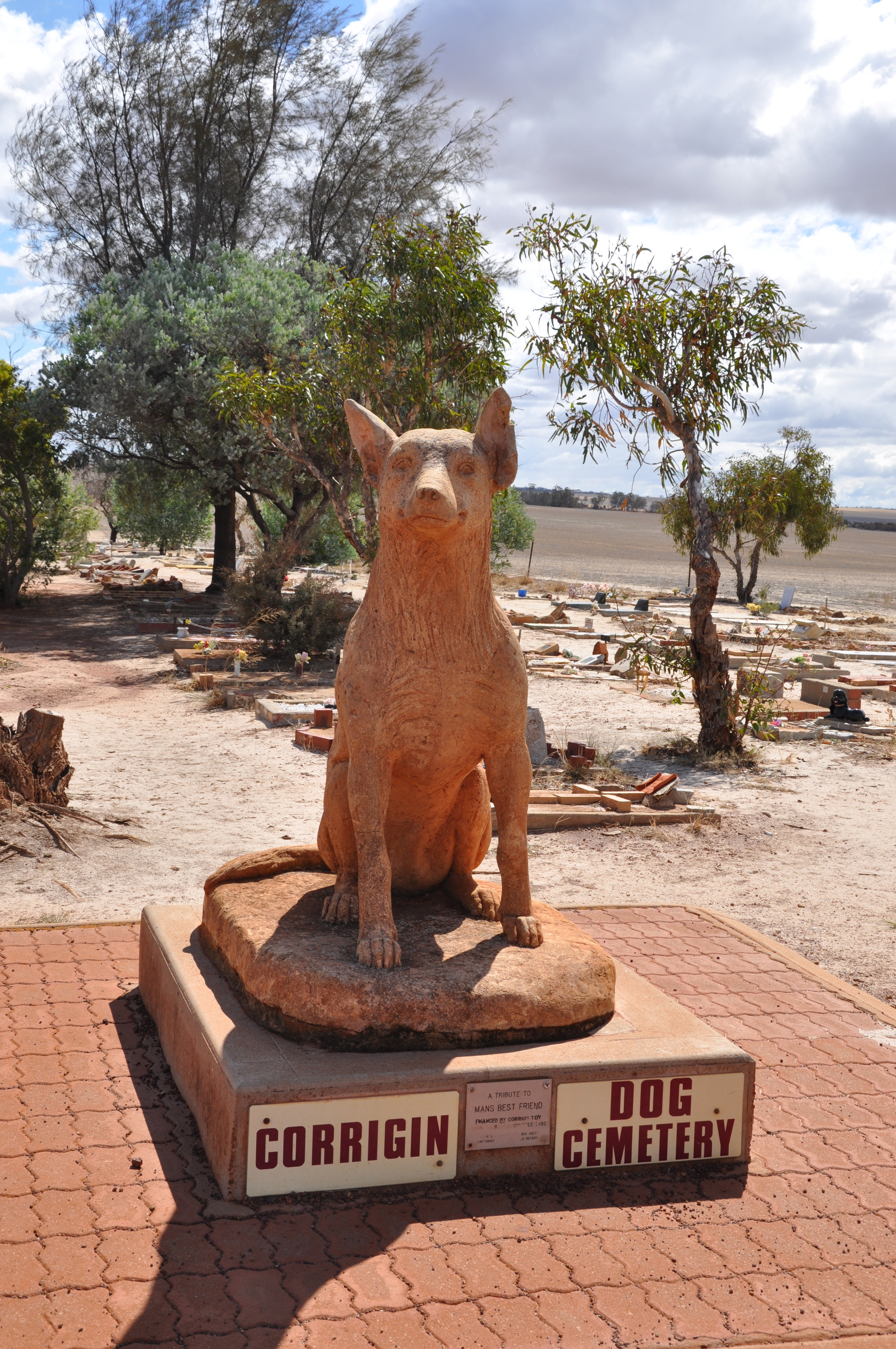
Dog cemetery

Corrigin has a population of 903 and is a key agricultural centre for a district focused mainly on wheat and sheep farming. It is the location of a CBH management zone office, and in 1973 was the location of a "type B" wheat bin.

It contains a district high school (originally opened 1915 as a primary school), National Australia Bank branch, shopping facilities, accommodation (hotel, motel, caravan park), council offices and a telecentre. Each year, it hosts an agricultural show.

The town is a stop on the Transwa bus service to Esperance via Kulin/Hyden.

A large rocky outcrop just to the east of town is Corrigin Rock.

About 5 km west of town is the Corrigin dog cemetery, containing over 80 buried dogs.

== In popular culture ==
Corrigan, the fictional town in which the 2009 Craig Silvey novel Jasper Jones and the subsequent film are set, derives its name from Corrigin.

== Climate ==
Climate data for Corrigin
Month	Jan	Feb	Mar	Apr	May	Jun	Jul	Aug	Sep	Oct	Nov	Dec	Year
Record high °C (°F)	45.9 (114.6)	46.5 (115.7)	42.8 (109.0)	37.1 (98.8)	33.3 (91.9)	26.2 (79.2)	23.5 (74.3)	29.5 (85.1)	34.0 (93.2)	38.7 (101.7)	42.0 (107.6)	43.9 (111.0)	46.5 (115.7)
Mean daily maximum °C (°F)	32.5 (90.5)	31.5 (88.7)	28.9 (84.0)	24.3 (75.7)	19.7 (67.5)	16.4 (61.5)	15.3 (59.5)	16.4 (61.5)	19.1 (66.4)	23.1 (73.6)	27.0 (80.6)	30.4 (86.7)	23.7 (74.7)
Mean daily minimum °C (°F)	15.8 (60.4)	16.0 (60.8)	14.3 (57.7)	11.2 (52.2)	7.6 (45.7)	5.9 (42.6)	4.9 (40.8)	4.7 (40.5)	5.7 (42.3)	8.2 (46.8)	11.3 (52.3)	14.0 (57.2)	10.0 (50.0)
Record low °C (°F)	7.0 (44.6)	6.5 (43.7)	2.2 (36.0)	−1.1 (30.0)	−4.3 (24.3)	−4.0 (24.8)	−4.2 (24.4)	−2.9 (26.8)	−2.5 (27.5)	−0.3 (31.5)	−0.2 (31.6)	3.9 (39.0)	−4.3 (24.3)
Average precipitation mm (inches)	16.9 (0.67)	16.2 (0.64)	21.0 (0.83)	23.0 (0.91)	47.2 (1.86)	60.2 (2.37)	59.9 (2.36)	47.3 (1.86)	30.0 (1.18)	21.1 (0.83)	16.5 (0.65)	13.1 (0.52)	372.5 (14.67)
Average precipitation days	2.5	2.6	3.4	5.1	9.5	12.6	14.2	12.3	9.3	6.4	4.2	2.7	84.8
Average relative humidity (%)	27	30	33	42	51	60	61	56	49	36	30	27	42
