= Shire of Corrigin =

Local government area in the Wheatbelt region of Western Australia

Coordinates: 32°19′37″S 117°52′30″E

- Local government area
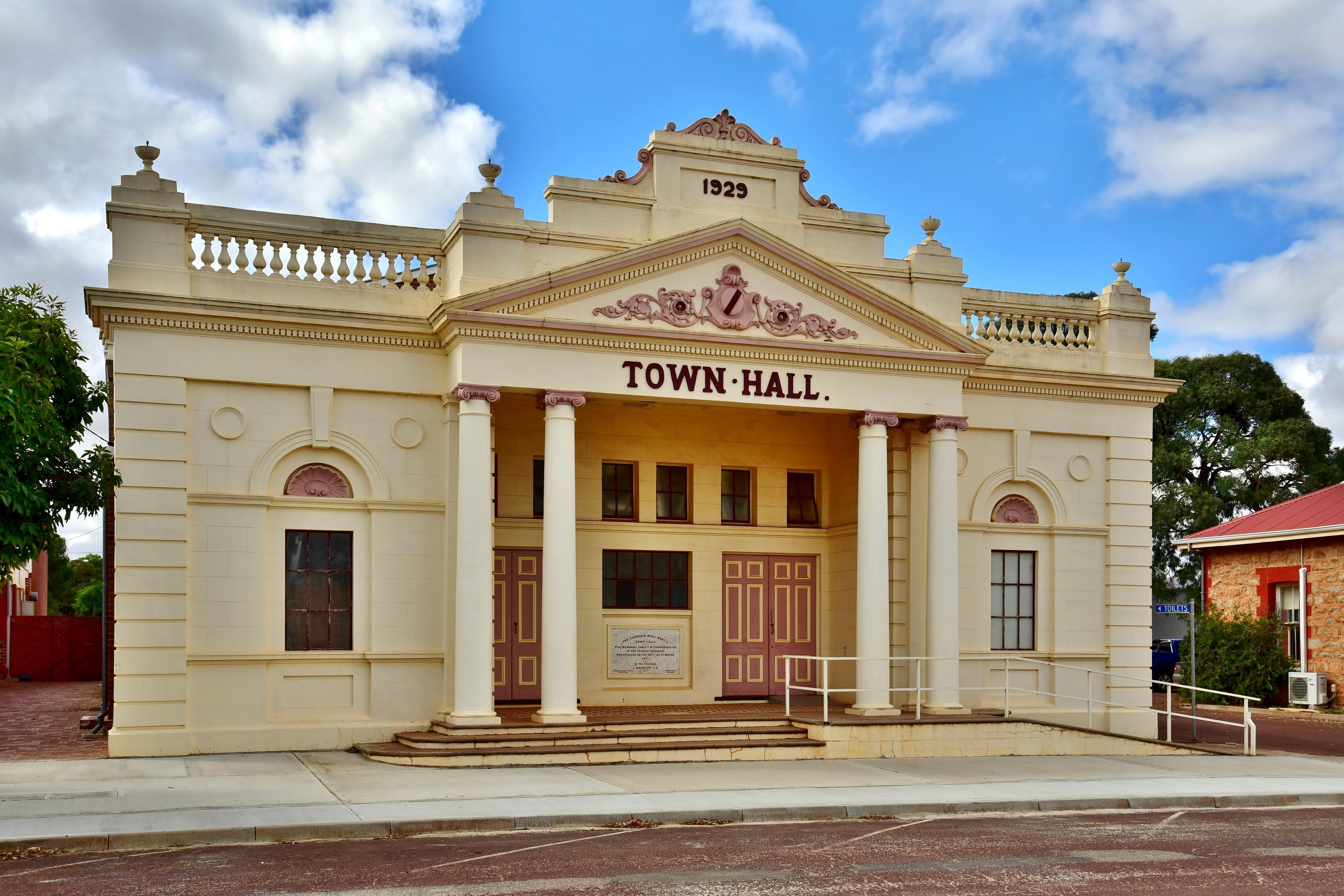
- The state heritage listed Corrigin Town Hall, 2018

- Interactive map of Shire of Corrigin
- Country: Australia
- State: Western Australia
- Region: Wheatbelt
- Established: 1913
- Council seat: Corrigin

Government
  - Shire President: Des Hickey
  - State electorate: Central Wheatbelt
  - Federal division: O'Connor

Area
  - Total: 3,095 km^{2} (1,195 sq mi)

Population
  - Total: 1,007 (LGA 2021)
- Website: Shire of Corrigin
LGAs around Shire of Corrigin
Quairading	Bruce Rock	Narembeen
Pingelly	Shire of Corrigin	Kondinin
Wickepin	Wickepin	Kulin

The Shire of Corrigin is a local government area in the Wheatbelt region of Western Australia, about 230 kilometres (143 mi) east of the state capital, Perth. Its seat of government is the town of Corrigin. The shire covers an area of 3,095 square kilometres (1,195 sq mi) and the economy, worth approximately $50 million per year to the state economy, is based on agriculture - predominantly cereal grains and sheep, with some supporting industries including a flour mill.

== History ==
From 1891 until 1913, different parts of the area was managed by Morambine (Pingelly), Greenhills and Brookton Road Boards. On 14 February 1913, after the announcement of a proposed railway from Brookton on the Great Southern Railway to terminate in the town of Kunjin, the Kunjinn Road District was gazetted. The first Road Board members held their meetings in a small timber and iron building with their first ever purchase being a billy, tea and sugar. After only three meetings, it was decided to shift the meeting venue to the new townsite of Corrigin as Kunjin was no longer under consideration as the major rail junction. Accordingly, in 1914, the district was renamed the Corrigin Road District. On 1 July 1961, it became a Shire under the Local Government Act 1960, which reformed all remaining road districts into shires.

== Wards ==
The first ward system, established in 1914, divided the road district into the Wogerlin, Kurren-Kutten, Bullaring, Central, Dondakin and Kunjinn Wards. The first two of these were abolished in 1988 and replaced with the Bilbarin Ward, and the Central Ward gradually increased in importance, reaching a peak of 5 of the 11 councillors then in place between 1992 and 1999.

From 1 May 1999 until 19 October 2007, the Shire was divided into three wards, each electing three councillors:

- North Ward
- Central Ward
- South Ward

As of 20 October 2007, the council is undivided and all nine councillors represent the entire Shire.

== Towns and localities ==
The towns and localities of the Shire of Corrigin with population and size figures based on the most recent Australian census:

Locality	Population	Area	Map
Adamsvale	41 (SAL 2021)	246.5 km^{2} (95.2 sq mi)	
Bilbarin	18 (SAL 2021)	182.3 km^{2} (70.4 sq mi)	
Bullaring	82 (SAL 2021)	559.1 km^{2} (215.9 sq mi)	
Bulyee	48 (SAL 2021)	414 km^{2} (160 sq mi)	
Corrigin	701 (SAL 2021)	393.6 km^{2} (152.0 sq mi)	
Gorge Rock	33 (SAL 2016)	248.6 km^{2} (96.0 sq mi)	
Kunjin	48 (SAL 2021)	326.8 km^{2} (126.2 sq mi)	
Kurrenkutten	33 (SAL 2021)	310.3 km^{2} (119.8 sq mi)	

== Population ==
Historical population

Year	Pop.	±% p.a.
1921	1,286	—
1933	1,845	+3.05%
1947	1,445	−1.73%
1954	1,894	+3.94%
1961	2,123	+1.64%
1966	2,099	−0.23%
1971	1,766	−3.40%
1976	1,736	−0.34%
1981	1,620	−1.37%

Year	Pop.	±% p.a.
1986	1,450	−2.19%
1991	1,384	−0.93%
1996	1,276	−1.61%
2001	1,227	−0.78%
2006	1,145	−1.37%
2011	1,063	−1.48%
2016	1,146	+1.52%
2021	1,007	−2.55%

== Notable councillors ==
- Brendon Grylls, Shire of Corrigin councillor 2000–2001; later a state MP

== Heritage-listed places ==
As of 2023, 197 places are heritage-listed in the Shire of Corrigin, of which four are on the State Register of Heritage Places.
