= Grain storage structures in Western Australia =

Grain storage facilities at locations in Western Australia

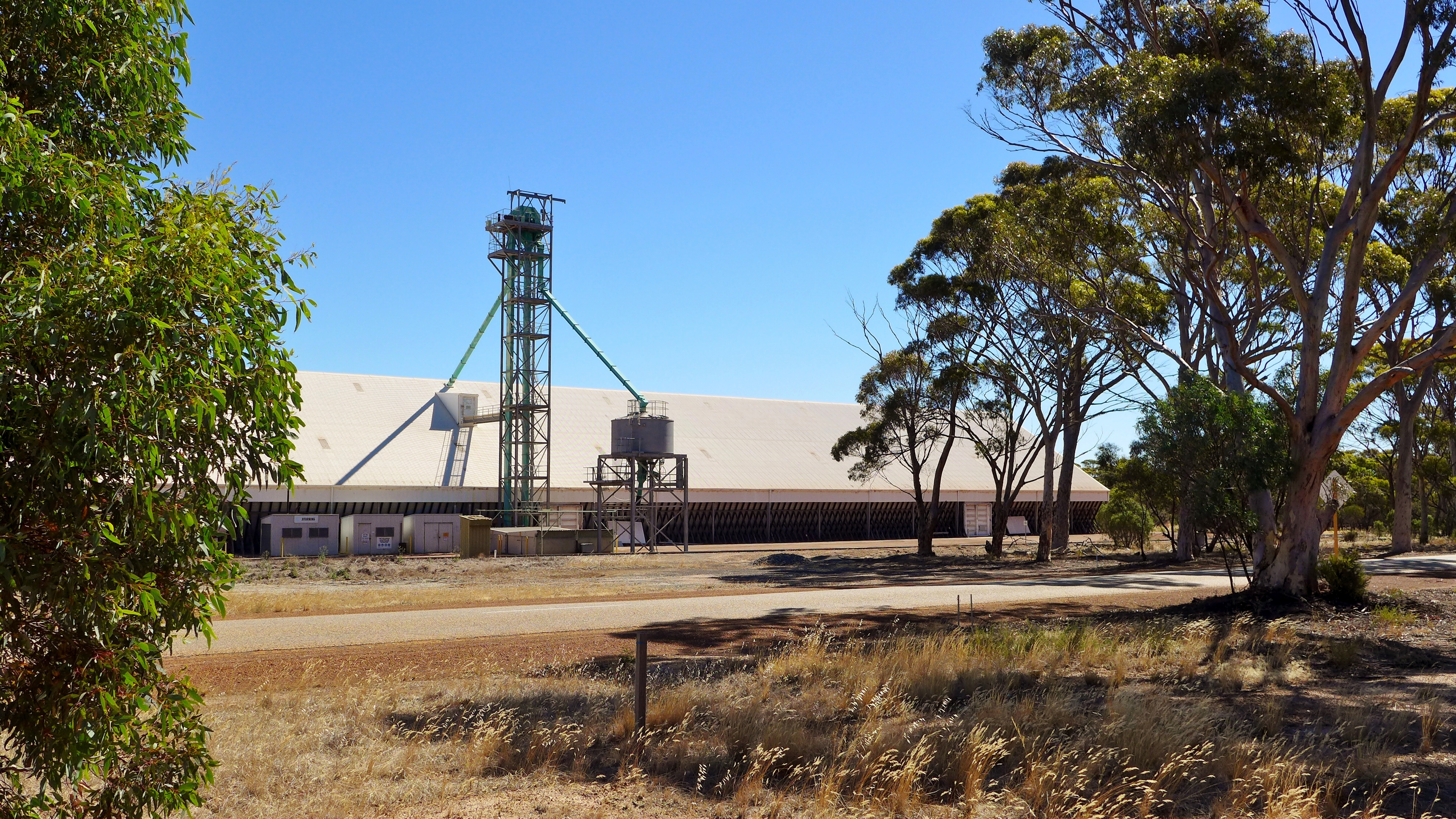
Jitarning grain receival point in 2014

Grain storage structures are grain silos spread around Western Australia, primarily in the wheatbelt region, at grain receival locations

They are linked with the wheatbelt railway lines of Western Australia and the transport of grain for export by the CBH Group to ports at Bunbury, Esperance, Fremantle, Geraldton and Kwinana.

== Structure types ==
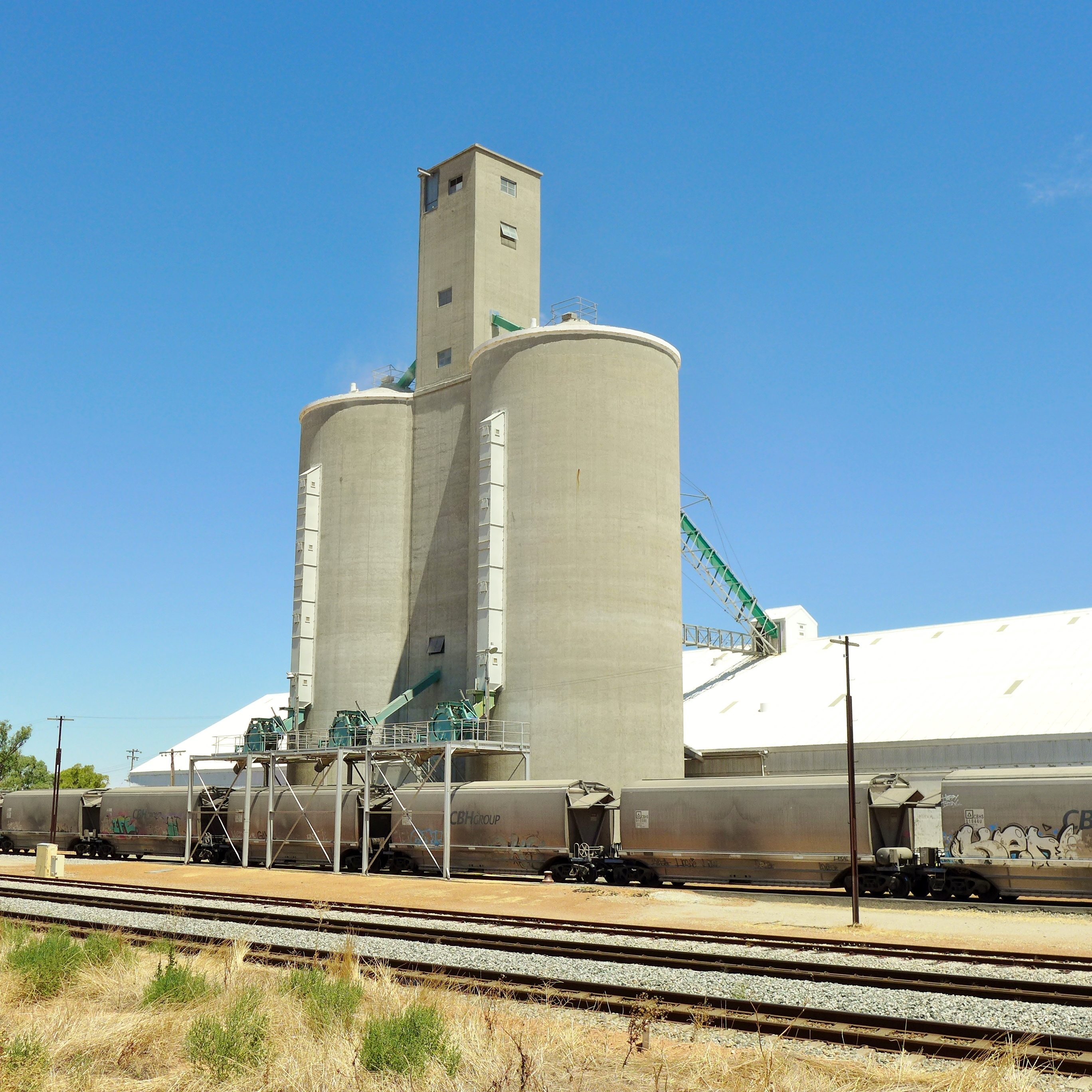
Cunderdin grain receival point in 2015

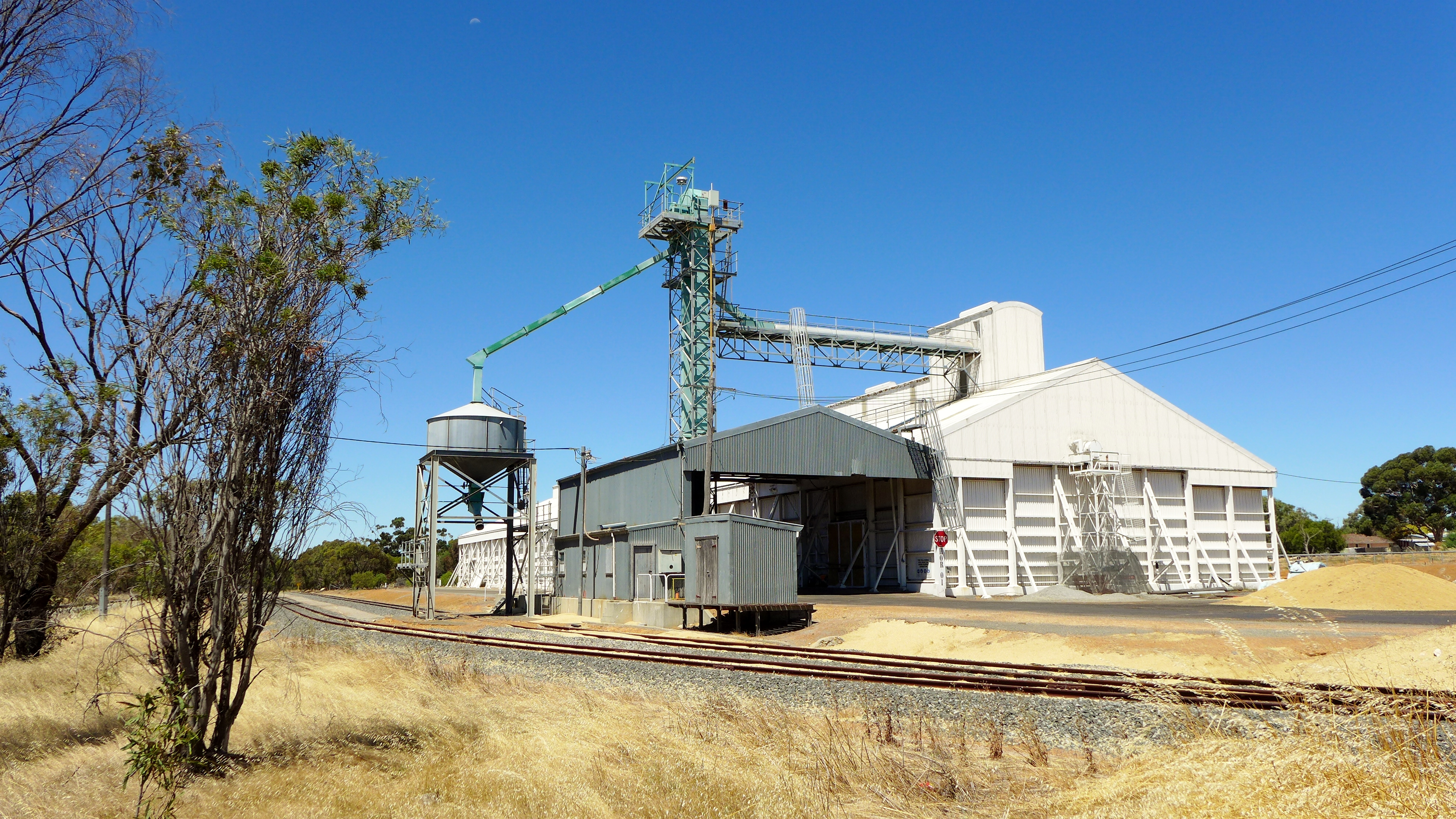
Wickepin grain receival point in 2014

Historically there were major structures found at Midland/Bellevue, it was a rail based storage while at Fremantle and Bunbury there were grain storage silos that were part of the port loading facilities.

The identification of the types of installations was made as follows:

- Horizontal 'H' type (1933+) circular wall
- Horizontal 'A' type (1960–1983) (85 in 2003)
- Horizontal 'B' type (1962–1982) (31 in 2003) (Note: In 1973, 'B' Types were in York, Beverley and Pingelly)
- Horizontal 'C' type (1966–1967) (5 in 2003)
- Horizontal 'D' type (1967–1982) (48 in 2003)
- Horizontal 'E' type (1969–1971) (20 in 2003)
- Horizontal 'F' type (1990) ( 1 in 2003)
- Horizontal 'G' type (1978–1982) (36 in 2003)
- Silo 'K' type (1980–1981) (26 in 2003)
- Silo 'L' type (1982) (19 in 2003)
- Circular 'M' type (1973–1994) (11 in 2003)
- Open Bulk Head 'O' type (1975–2003) (number unknown)
- Roofed Bulk Head 'P' type (1986–1989) (3 in 2003)
- Horizontal 'Q' type (1995–2000) (12 in 2003)
- Silo 'S' type (2000–2003) (number unknown)
- Circular 'X' type
- Bulkwest CS2000 Series (102 in 2003)
- Circular Domes (1994) (4 in 2003)

== Table ==
Name of design	Constructed	Design	Capacity in tonnes	Number in operation 2003
Horizontal 'A' Type	1960–1983	Horizontal storage	10,900 to 34,000	85
Horizontal 'B' Type	1962–1982	Horizontal storage	8,200 to 21,800	31

== Metro Grain Centre ==
The Perth based Metro Grain Centre is located on Abernethy Road in Forrestfield. It is connected by road and rail with the port in Fremantle Harbour, for container shipping, and Kwinana port for bulk handling of grain. It opened in March 1998 and can store 200,000 tonnes of grain.

== Port silos ==
=== Bunbury ===
Grain silos built at Bunbury in 1937, were decommissioned in the 1980s, and have been re-styled as accommodation since 1994.

=== Fremantle ===
Built on the North Quay in 1948, the Fremantle grain silos were demolished in 2000 after a heritage application was rejected by the Minister for Planning.
