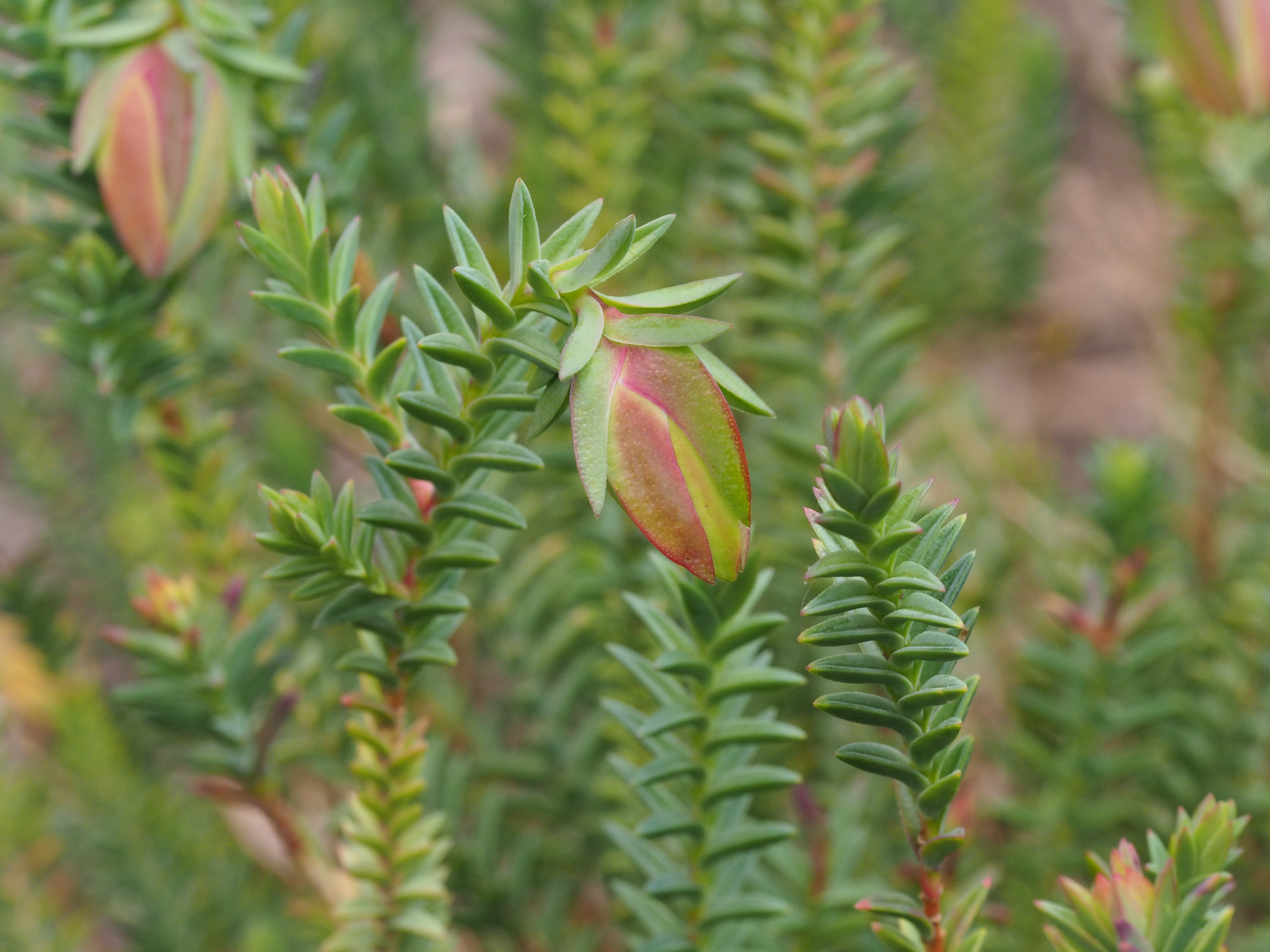
- Darwinia carnea leaves and inflorescence (not fully open)

Conservation status
- Endangered (EPBC Act)

Scientific classification
- Kingdom: Plantae
- Clade: Tracheophytes
- Clade: Angiosperms
- Clade: Eudicots
- Clade: Rosids
- Order: Myrtales
- Family: Myrtaceae
- Genus: Darwinia
- Species: D. carnea

Binomial name
- Darwinia carnea C.A.Gardner

= Darwinia carnea =

Mogumber or Narrogin bell

Species of flowering plant

Darwinia carnea, commonly known as Mogumber bell or Narrogin bell, is a species of flowering plant in the myrtle family Myrtaceae and is endemic to the south-west of Western Australia. It is a small shrub with narrow, keeled leaves and flowers in groups of about eight, surrounded by yellowish-green to pinkish-red bracteoles. It occurs in small, isolated populations near the towns which contribute to its common names. It is the only "bell-flowered" Darwinia to not grow in the Stirling Range National Park.

== Description ==
Darwinia carnea is a shrub growing to 0.2–2.0 metres (0.7–7 ft) high with leaves arranged in opposite pairs, each pair at right-angles to the pair above. The leaves are glabrous, roughly V-shaped in cross-section, linear to lance-shaped, mostly 6–10 millimetres (0.2–0.4 in) long and about 1 millimetre (0.04 in) wide.

The flowers are arranged near the ends of the branches in groups of 10 to 14, each group surrounded by broad, glabrous, egg-shaped yellowish-green to pinkish-red bracteoles up to 30 millimetres (1 in) long. Individual flowers within this bell-like inflorescence are tubular, have blunt-tipped, egg-shaped petals, 4 millimetres (0.2 in) long and 2 millimetres (0.08 in) wide. Flowering occurs between October and December and is followed by fruit which is a small, non-fleshy nut.

The form occurring near Mogumber is taller, growing up to 2.0 metres (7 ft), has larger flowers and differently coloured bracteoles than the one found near Narrogin.

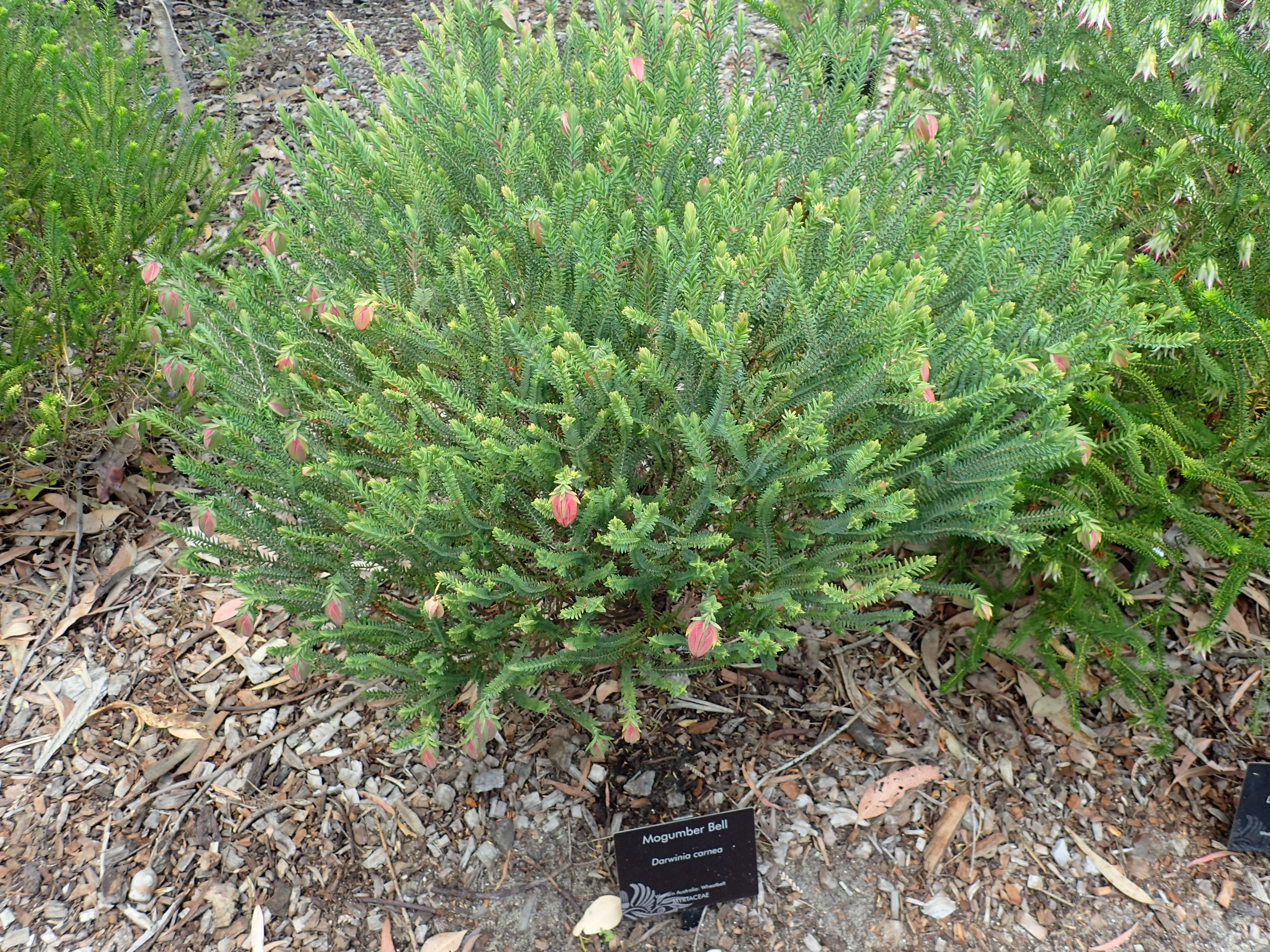
D. carnea growing in Kings Park

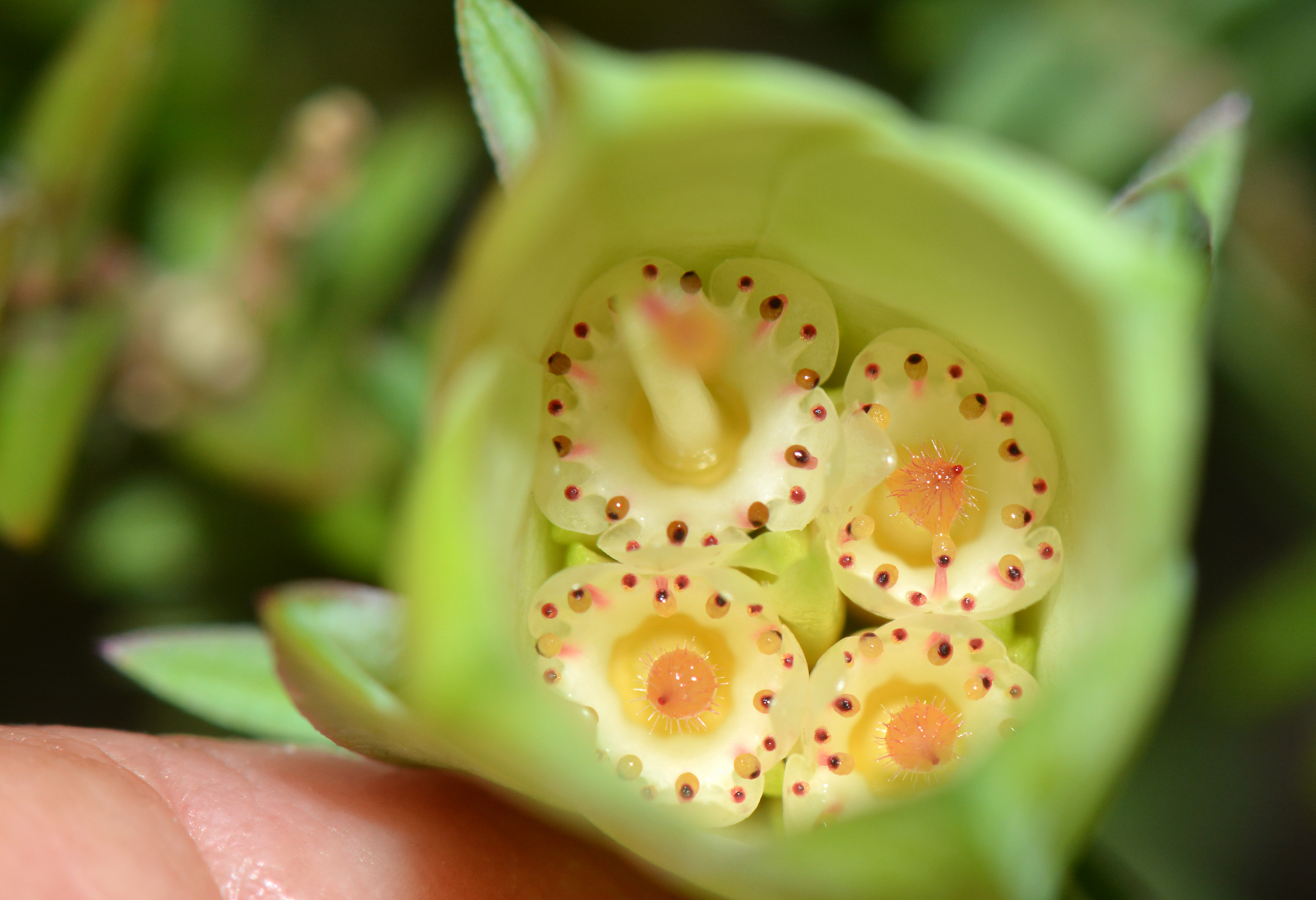
Individual flowers

== Taxonomy ==
The first formal description of D. carnea was published by Charles Gardner in 1923 in Royal Society of Western Australia. He collected the type specimen between Mogumber and New Norcia. The specific epithet (carnea) is a Latin word meaning "flesh" referring to the colour of the floral bracts.

== Distribution and habitat ==
The two forms of this darwinia are separated by 250 kilometres (200 mi) and differ from each other in some respects. There is only one small population near Narrogin and three near Mogumber, all on private property. They occur on gravelly hilltops or lateritic breakaways in heathy woodland. Three translocated populations have been established in nature reserves.

== Conservation ==
Darwinia carnea is classified as "Threatened Flora (Declared Rare Flora — Extant)" by the Western Australian Government Department of Parks and Wildlife and a Recovery Plan has been prepared. It has also been listed as "Endangered" (EN) under the Australian Government Environment Protection and Biodiversity Conservation Act 1999 (EPBC Act).

This darwinia may always have been rare. In the 1980s, a visiting botanist is alleged to have warned a property owner of the existence of the plant on his property, warned the farmer to look after the darwinia by fencing off a 150 acres (60 ha), but would not tell him precisely where the plant was found. The farmer was not prepared to fence off such a large paddock from his sheep. On a subsequent visit to the property, botanists were unable to find any D. carnea.

== Use in horticulture ==
Darwinia carnea is reasonably well known in gardens but requires excellent drainage and needs some overhead protection. It can be grown from cuttings but more success has been achieved by grafting onto Darwinia citriodora rootstock.
