= Mogumber Nature Reserve =

Nature reserve in Western Australia

- IUCN category Ia (strict nature reserve)
- Location within Western Australia
- Location: Western Australia
- Nearest city: Mogumber
- Coordinates: 31.0701°S 116.0433°E
- Area: 231 ha (570 acres)
- Established: 1984

The Mogumber Nature Reserve is a nature reserve in Western Australia. It is a refuge for the endangered Western Swamp Tortoise along with the Twin Swamps Nature Reserve and the Ellen Brook Nature Reserve. Twin Swamps and Ellen Brook are IUCN Protected Area Management Category IV Reserves, while the Mogumber Nature Reserve is a Category Ia nature reserve.

The vegetation is a woodland dominated by marri (Corymbia calophylla) and jarrah (Eucalyptus marginata). The rare species Darwinia carnea (Mogumber bell) occurs in the area.

Amongst the fauna is a group of Carnaby's black cockatoo, attracted to tree hollows and food in the woodland.

The site is associated with the Yued people of Southwest Australia, who record it as a meeting point for other groups and within the broader Moore River Mythological Waggyl site.
