= List of towns in Western Australia =

This is a list of Towns of Western Australia.

In Australia, including in the state of Western Australia, towns are commonly understood to be centres of population not formally declared to be cities or not within the urban area surrounding a city.

== A ==
- Abbotts – abandoned
- Acton Park
- Agnew
- Ajana
- Albany (city)
- Aldersyde
- Allanson
- Amelup
- Amery
- Ardath
- Arrino
- Arrowsmith
- Arthur River
- Augusta
- Austin – abandoned
- Australind

== B ==
- Baandee
- Babakin
- Badgebup
- Badgingarra
- Badjaling
- Bailup
- Bakers Hill
- Balgo
- Balingup
- Balkuling
- Balladonia
- Ballidu
- Banksiadale – abandoned
- Bardi
- Beacon
- Bedfordale
- Beermullah
- Bejoording
- Belka
- Bencubbin
- Bendering
- Benger
- Benjaberring
- Beverley
- Big Bell – abandoned
- Bilbarin
- Bindi Bindi
- Bindoon
- Binningup
- Binnu
- Bodallin
- Boddington
- Bolgart
- Bonnie Rock
- Bonnie Vale
- Boranup
- Borden
- Bornholm
- Boscabel
- Bow Bridge
- Boxwood Hill
- Boyanup
- Boyup Brook
- Bremer Bay
- Bridgetown
- Broad Arrow – abandoned
- Brookton
- Broome
- Broomehill
- Bruce Rock
- Brunswick Junction
- Bullabulling
- Bullaring
- Bullfinch
- Bullsbrook
- Bulong
- Bunbury (city)
- Bungulla
- Bunjil
- Buntine
- Burakin
- Burekup
- Burracoppin
- Busselton (city)
- Byford

== C ==
- Cadoux
- Caiguna
- Calingiri
- Camballin
- Cape Burney
- Capel
- Carbunup River
- Carcoola
- Carnamah
- Carnarvon
- Carrabin
- Cataby
- Cervantes
- Chidlow
- Chittering
- Clackline
- Cocklebiddy
- Collie
- Condingup
- Congelin
- Cookernup
- Coolgardie
- Coolup
- Coomberdale
- Coorow
- Coral Bay
- Corrigin
- Cossack – abandoned
- Cowaramup
- Cowcowing
- Cranbrook
- Crossman
- Cuballing
- Cue
- Cunderdin

== D ==
- Dalwallinu
- Dalyup
- Dampier
- Dandaragan
- Dangin
- Dardanup
- Darkan
- Davyhurst
- Day Dawn – abandoned
- Deanmill
- Denham
- Denmark
- Derby
- Dinninup
- Dongara
- Donnelly River
- Donnybrook
- Doodlakine
- Dowerin
- Drummond Cove
- Dudinin
- Dumbleyung
- Dunsborough
- Duranillin
- Dwarda
- Dwellingup

== E ==
- Eagle Bay
- Ejanding
- Elgin
- Elleker
- Emu Hill – abandoned
- Eneabba
- Eradu
- Erikin
- Esperance
- Eucla
- Exmouth

== F ==
- Ferguson
- Fitzgerald
- Fitzroy Crossing
- Forrest
- Frankland

== G ==
- Gabbin
- Gabbadah
- Gairdner
- Gascoyne Junction
- Geraldton (city)
- Gibb River
- Gibson
- Gidgegannup
- Gingin
- Gleneagle – abandoned
- Gnarabup
- Gnowangerup
- Goldsworthy – abandoned
- Goomalling
- Gracetown
- Grass Patch
- Grass Valley
- Green Head
- Greenbushes
- Greenhills
- Greenough
- Guilderton
- Gutha
- Gwalia – abandoned

== H ==
- Halls Creek
- Hamel
- Hamelin Bay
- Hamelin Pool
- Harrismith
- Harpertown
- Harvey
- Herron
- Hester
- Highbury
- Hill River
- Hines Hill
- Holt Rock
- Hopetoun
- Horrocks
- Howatharra
- Hyden

== I ==
- Ilkurlka
- Injidup
- Israelite Bay
- Isseka

== J ==
- Jardee
- Jarrahdale
- Jarrahwood
- Jennacubbine
- Jennapullin
- Jerdacuttup
- Jerramungup
- Jigalong Community
- Jitarning
- Jurien Bay

== K ==
- Kalannie
- Kalbarri
- Kalgan
- Kalgoorlie (city)
- Kambalda
- Kanowna – abandoned
- Karakin
- Karlgarin
- Karratha (city)
- Karridale
- Katanning
- Kellerberrin
- Kendenup
- Keysbrook
- King River
- Kirup
- Kiwirrkurra
- Kojarena
- Kojonup
- Kondinin
- Kondut
- Koojan
- Kookynie – abandoned
- Koolyanobbing
- Koorda
- Korrelocking
- Kukerin
- Kulin
- Kulja
- Kumarina
- Kunjin
- Kununoppin
- Kununurra
- Kweda
- Kwelkan
- Kwolyin

== L ==
- Lake Brown
- Lake Clifton
- Lake Grace
- Lake King
- Lancelin
- Latham
- Laverton
- Learmonth
- Ledge Point
- Leeman
- Leinster
- Leonora
- Little Grove
- Loongana
- Lower King
- Ludlow
- Lynton

== M ==
- Madura
- Mandurah (city)
- Manjimup
- Manmanning
- Manypeaks
- Mantamaru
- Marble Bar
- Marchagee
- Margaret River
- Marradong
- Marvel Loch
- Maya
- Mayanup
- Meadow
- Meckering
- Meekatharra
- Menzies
- Merkanooka
- Merredin
- Metricup
- Miling
- Mingenew
- Minilya
- Minnenooka
- Mogumber, formerly Moore River Native Settlement
- Monkey Mia
- Mooliabeenie
- Moonyoonooka
- Moora
- Moorine Rock
- Morawa
- Moulyinning
- Mount Barker
- Mount Kokeby
- Mount Magnet
- Muchea
- Mukinbudin
- Mullalyup
- Mullewa
- Mundijong
- Mundrabilla
- Munglinup
- Muntadgin
- Muradup
- Murchison
- Myalup

== N ==
- Nabawa
- Nanga Brook – abandoned
- Nangeenan
- Nangetty
- Nannine – abandoned
- Nannup
- Nanson
- Nanutarra
- Narembeen
- Narrikup
- Narrogin
- New Norcia
- Newdegate
- Newman
- Nilgen
- Nornalup
- Norseman
- North Bannister
- North Dandalup
- Northam
- Northampton
- Northcliffe
- Nullagine
- Nungarin
- Nyabing

== O ==
- Oakajee
- Ocean Beach
- Onslow
- Oombulgurri
- Ora Banda
- Osmington
- Ongerup

== P ==
- Palgarup
- Pannawonica
- Papulankutja
- Pantapin
- Paraburdoo
- Patjarr
- Paynes Find
- Paynesville – abandoned
- Peak Hill – abandoned
- Pemberton
- Peppermint Grove Beach
- Perenjori
- Perth (Capital city of WA)
- Piawaning
- Piesseville
- Pindar
- Pingaring
- Pingelly
- Pingrup
- Pinjarra
- Pintharuka
- Pithara
- Point Samson
- Popanyinning
- Porlell – abandoned
- Porongurup
- Port Denison
- Port Gregory
- Port Hedland
- Preston Beach
- Prevelly
- Princess Royal – abandoned

== Q ==
- Quairading
- Quindalup
- Quindanning

== R ==
- Ranford
- Ravensthorpe
- Rawlinna
- Redmond
- Reedy
- Regans Ford
- Rocky Gully
- Roebourne
- Roelands
- Roleystone
- Rosa Brook
- Rothsay – abandoned
- Rottnest Island

== S ==
- Salmon Gums
- Sandstone
- Scaddan
- Seabird
- Serpentine
- Shackleton
- Shay Gap – abandoned
- Schotts
- Sir Samuel – abandoned
- South Hedland
- South Kumminin
- Southern Cross
- Stratham

== T ==
- Tambellup
- Tammin
- Tampa – Abandoned
- Tardun
- Telfer
- Tenindewa
- Tenterden
- The Lakes
- Three Springs
- Tincurrin
- Tjirrkarli
- Tjukurla
- Tom Price
- Toodyay
- Torbay
- Trayning
- Tuckanarra
- Tunney

== U ==
- Unicup
- Useless Loop

== V ==
- Varley
- Vasse
- Vivien

== W ==
- Wagerup
- Wagin
- Walebing
- Walgoolan
- Walkaway
- Walpole
- Wandering
- Wannamal
- Warakurna
- Warawarrup
- Warburton
- Warmun
- Waroona
- Waterloo
- Watheroo
- Wedge Island
- Welbungin
- Wellstead
- Westonia
- Wialki
- Wickepin
- Wickham
- Widgiemooltha
- Wilga
- Williams
- Wiluna
- Wilyabrup
- Windanya – Abandoned
- Windy Harbour
- Witchcliffe
- Wittenoom
- Wokalup
- Wongan Hills
- Wonnerup
- Woodanilling
- Woodarra
- Woodridge
- Wooramel
- Wooroloo
- Worsley
- Wubin
- Wundowie
- Wyalkatchem
- Wyndham

== X ==
- Xantippe

== Y ==
- Yalgoo
- Yallingup
- Yandanooka
- Yarloop
- Yarri
- Yealering
- Yelbeni
- Yellowdine
- Yerecoin
- Yerilla
- Yilliminning
- Yoongarillup
- York
- Yorkrakine
- Yornaning
- Yornup
- Yoting
- Youanmi – abandoned
- Youndegin
- Yoweragabbie
- Yuna
- Yundamindera – abandoned
- Yunndaga – abandoned

== Z ==
- Zanthus
- Zeehan
- Zuytdorp
