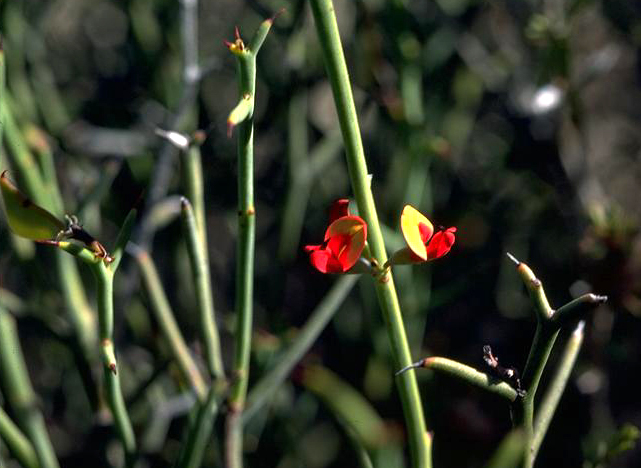
- Near Tammin

Conservation status
- Priority Three — Poorly Known Taxa (DEC)

Scientific classification
- Kingdom: Plantae
- Clade: Tracheophytes
- Clade: Angiosperms
- Clade: Eudicots
- Clade: Rosids
- Order: Fabales
- Family: Fabaceae
- Subfamily: Faboideae
- Genus: Daviesia
- Species: D. uncinata

Binomial name
- Daviesia uncinata Crisp

= Daviesia uncinata =

Species of legume

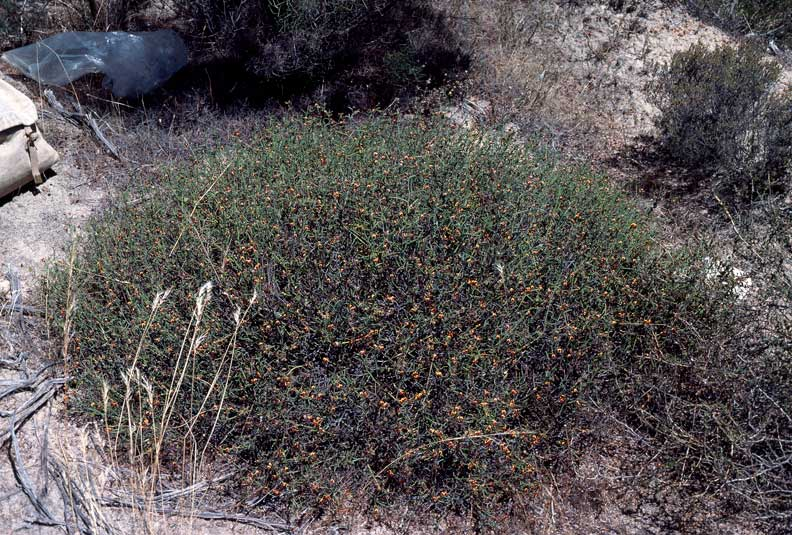
Habit near Bruce Rock

Daviesia uncinata is a species of flowering plant in the family Fabaceae and is endemic to the south-west of Western Australia. It is a densely-branched shrub with many stems, hooked, needle-shaped, sharply pointed phyllodes continuous with the branchlets and rich yellow and pinkish-red flowers.

== Description ==
Daviesia uncinata is a densely-branched shrub that typically grows to a height of up to 70 cm (28 in) and has many stems. Its phyllodes are scattered, circular in cross-section and continuous with the branchlets, 5–70 mm (0.20–2.76 in) long, 1–2 mm (0.039–0.079 in) wide and sharply pointed with a hooked end. The flowers are arranged in a single group of one to several in the axils on a peduncle 1–4 mm (0.039–0.157 in) long, each flower on a pedicel 1.0–1.5 mm (0.039–0.059 in) long. The sepals are 2.5–3.5 mm (0.098–0.138 in) long and joined bell-shaped at the base, the upper two lobes joined for most of their length and the lower three triangular. The standard petal is broadly egg-shaped with a notched centre, about 6–7 mm (0.24–0.28 in) long, 4–5 mm (0.16–0.20 in) wide and rich yellow yellow dark pinkish-red markings. The wings are 5.5–6.0 mm (0.22–0.24 in) long and pinkish-red, the keel 5.5–6.5 mm (0.22–0.26 in) long and pinkish-red with a black tip. Flowering occurs from October to January and the fruit is a flattened, shallowly triangular pod 11–15 mm (0.43–0.59 in) long.

== Taxonomy ==
Daviesia uncinata was first formally described in 1995 by Michael Crisp in Australian Systematic Botany from specimens collected by Crisp near Yoting in 1979. The specific epithet (uncinata) means "hooked" or "barbed" referring to phyllodes.

== Distribution and habitat ==
This daviesia grows in kwongan in the area between Kellerberrin, Piesseville and Lake Magenta in the Avon Wheatbelt and Mallee bioregions of south-western Western Australia.

== Conservation status ==
Daviesia uncinata is classified as "Priority Three" by the Government of Western Australia Department of Biodiversity, Conservation and Attractions, meaning that it is poorly known and known from only a few locations but is not under imminent threat.
