= List of acts of the Parliament of Western Australia from 1911 =

This is a list of acts of the Parliament of Western Australia for the year 1911.

== 1911 ==
=== Public acts ===
Short title, or popular name	Citation	Royal assent
Long title
Reserve Act 1910	No. 1 of 1911	19 January 1911
An Act to enable the purpose of portion of Permanent Reserve numbered A↑/4991 to be changed.
Bridgetown–Wilgarrup Railway Extension Act 1911	No. 5 of 1911	16 February 1911
An Act to authorise an Extension of the Bridgetown-Wilgarrup Railway.
Katanning–Nampup Railway Act 1911	No. 7 of 1911	16 February 1911
An Act to authorise the Construction of a Railway from Katanning to Nampup.
Quairading–Nunajin Railway Act 1911	No. 8 of 1911	16 February 1911
An Act to authorise the Construction of a Railway from Quairading to Nunajin.
Wagin–Dumbleyung Railway Extension Act 1911	No. 9 of 1911	16 February 1911
An Act to authorise an Extension of the Wagin–Dumbleyung Railway.
Wickepin–Merredin Railway Act 1911	No. 10 of 1911	16 February 1911
An Act to authorise the Construction of a Railway from Wickepin to Merredin.
Tambellup–Ongerup Railway Act 1911	No. 11 of 1911	16 February 1911
An Act to authorise the Construction of a Railway from Tambellup to Ongerup.
Northampton–Ajana Railway Act 1911	No. 12 of 1911	16 February 1911
An Act to authorise the Construction of a Railway from Northampton to Ajana.
Naraling–Yuna Railway Act 1911	No. 14 of 1911	16 February 1911
An Act to authorise the Construction of a Railway from Naraling to Yuna.
Brookton–Kunjinn Railway Act 1911	No. 15 of 1911	16 February 1911
An Act to authorise the Construction of a Railway from Brookton to Kunjinn.
Wongan Hills–Mullewa Railway Act 1911	No. 16 of 1911	16 February 1911
An Act to authorise the Construction of a Railway from Wougan Hills to k[ullewa.
Dwellingup–Hotham Railway Act 1911	No. 17 of 1911	16 February 1911
An Act to authorise the Construction of a Railway from Dwellingup to Hotham.
University of Western Australia Act 1911	No. 37 of 1911	16 February 1911
An Act to Establish, Incorporate, and Endow the University of Western Australia.
	No. X of 1911	
Criminal Code Amendment Act 1911	No. 52 of 1911	31 December 1911
An Act to amend the Criminal Code.

=== Private acts ===
Short title, or popular name	Citation	Royal assent
Long title
	Private Act of 1911	19 January 1911
An Act to declare the ownership of Fremantle Lodge No. 2 of Freemasons in and to Fremantle Town Lot 870, and to facilitate the sale, mortgage, or other disposition thereof, and for other purposes connected with the said Lodge.
York Mechanics' Institute Transfer Land Act 1911	Private Act of 1911	16 February 1911
An Act to vest in the Municipality of York the land and other assets of the York Mechanics' Institute, freed from the Trusts affecting the same; to discharge the Trustees thereof from such Trusts, and to provide for the payment by the said Municipality of all the liabilities of the said Institute.

== Sources ==
- "legislation.wa.gov.au".
