= List of State Register of Heritage Places in the Shire of Wagin =

List of heritage sites in the Wheatbelt region of Western Australia

The State Register of Heritage Places is maintained by the Heritage Council of Western Australia. As of 2026, 92 places are heritage-listed in the Shire of Wagin, of which eight are on the State Register of Heritage Places.

== List ==
=== State Register of Heritage Places ===
The Western Australian State Register of Heritage Places, as of 2026, lists the following eight state registered places within the Shire of Wagin:

Place name	Place #	Street number	Street name	Suburb or town	Co-ordinates	Notes & former names	Photo
Federal Hotel (former) Wagin	2630	Corner	Tudhoe & Tudor Street	Wagin	33.308321°S 117.344202°E	Mitchell House	
Butterick's Building, Wagin	2634	85	Tudor Street	Wagin	33.309045°S 117.344489°E		
Hitching Post outside National Bank	2636		Tudor Street	Wagin	33.309153°S 117.344732°E		
Moran's Wagin Hotel	2637	Corner	Tudor & Tavistock Street	Wagin	33.310282°S 117.344946°E	Tunney's Hotel	
National Bank, Wagin	2638	83	Tudor Street	Wagin	33.30927°S 117.344555°E		
Wagin Post Office	2640	39	Tudhoe Street	Wagin	33.308681°S 117.343756°E		
Wagin Town Hall	2642	Corner	Tudor & Tavistock Street	Wagin	33.309612°S 117.344768°E	Wagin Agricultural Hall, Wagin Honour Roll, Wagin Town Hall & Lesser Hall	
ABC Transmission Station	2649		Arthur Road	Minding	33.338859°S 117.091123°E	Minding Radio Station 6WA, South West Regional Broadcasting Station	

=== Shire of Wagin heritage-listed places ===
The following places are heritage listed in the Shire of Wagin but are not State registered:

Place name	Place #	Street number	Street name	Suburb or town	Notes & former names	Photo
St George's Parish Hall	2626	Corner	Tarbet & Trenton Streets	Wagin		
Masonic Hall	2627		Tarbet Street	Wagin		
Wagin Fire Station	2628	7	Traverse Street	Wagin		
Bank Of New South Wales (NSW) (former)	2629		Tudhoe Street	Wagin	Westpac Bank	
C A Piesse Store, Wagin	2631	60	Tudhoe Street	Wagin		
Shops 1919	2632		Tudhoe Street	Wagin		
Union Bank (former)	2633		Tudhoe Street	Wagin	Community Centre	
Court House	2635		Tudor Street	Wagin		
Palace Hotel	2639	Corner	Tudhoe Street & Padbury Lane	Wagin		
Wagin Road Board Office (former)	2643		Trent Street	Wagin	Wagin Library	
Baptist Church & Hall	2644	Corner	Upland & Cowcher Streets	Wagin		
Baptist Manse	2646	Corner	Upland & Streetrickland Streets	Wagin		
Our Lady of Lourdes Convent & St Joseph's Old Primary School (former), Wagin	2650		Warwick & Khedive Streets	Wagin	Hostel for Aborigines (former), Our Lady of Lourdes Convent (former)	
Barton Hotel (former)	2651		Great Southern Highway	Piesseville		
St George's Anglican Church	2652		Lukin Street	Wagin		
Wagin Methodist Church (former)	2653	Corner	Tavistock & Ranford Streets	Wagin	Uniting Church	
West Australian Bank (former)	2654		Tavistock Street	Wagin	Wagin District Club	
Condinning Hall	2655		Condinning Road	Piesseville		
War Memorial Hall	2656		Dongolocking Road	Cancanning		
Collanilling Uniting Church	2657		Collanilling Road	Collanilling		
Wedgecarrup Hall	2658		Jessup Road	Warup		
Wagin District Hospital	5367		Warwick Street	Wagin		
Aboriginal Reserve	9020	Corner	Lloyd/Urban Streets	Wagin		
Ampol Distribution Area	9021		Tudor Street, Railway Reserve	Wagin		
Australian Pensioners League & RSL Memorial Hall	9022		Traverse Street	Wagin		
Badgarning Dam & Puntapin Dam/Rock Reserve	9023			Wagin	Badjarning Dam and Puntapin Dam/Rock Reserve	
Wagin Drive-In Ticket Office (former)	9024		Ballagin Street	Wagin		
CBH	9025		Vernon Street	Wagin		
Butterick's Buildings 1912	9026	50	Tudhoe Street	Wagin		
Wagin Cemetery	9027		Arthur Road	Wagin		
Cresswells Handry Stores (former)	9028		Tudor Street	Wagin	Commercial Building	
Commonwealth Bank & Residence (former), Wagin	9029		Tudhoe Street	Wagin	Commonwealth Bank, ABC Regional Radio Studio	
Fountain	9030		Tudor Street	Wagin		
Giant Ram	9031		Arthur Road	Wagin		
Millars T & T (former)	9032		Tudor Street, Railway Reserve	Wagin	Grainfeeds	
Wagin Power Station (former)	9033		Trent Street	Wagin	Little Gem Theatre	
Blacksmiths - Site of	9034	Corner	Tudhoe & Trent Streets	Wagin	Bankwest	
Lonely Graves - McKenna family members	9035	Corner	Norring-Dellyanine-Boyalling Roads	Wagin	Quabing	
Wagin Post Office Quarters	9036	Corner	Tudhoe & Union Streets	Wagin		
Wagin Railway Station	9037		Railway Reserve, Tudor Street	Wagin		
Shops (Bunnings)	9038		Tudhoe Street	Wagin		
Shops	9039		Tudhoe Street	Wagin	Kylie T's Fashion House, Wagin Jewellers & Gift Ware, Twiggies Floral	
Shops (Newsagency)	9040		Tudhoe Street	Wagin		
Flour Mill Site	9041		Ventnor Street	Wagin	Flour Mill	
Wagin Argus Printers & Publishers	9042	Corner	Tavistock/Ranford Streets	Wagin		
Wagin Memorial Swimming Pool & War Memorial	9043	Corner	Trench & Tarbet Streets	Wagin		
Residence	9044	22	Johnston Street	Wagin		
Harcourt	9045	43	Johnston Street	Wagin		
Anglican Rectory & Office	9046	4	Trenton Street	Wagin		
House, 6 Trenton St	9047	6	Trenton Street	Wagin	Lot 19, Residence	
Elderberry Cottage	9048	1	Trent Street	Wagin	Mechanics' Institute, Residence	
Residence	9049	14	Tudhoe Street	Wagin		
Residence	9147	8	Unit Street	Wagin		
Residence	9148	9	Warwick Street	Wagin		
Tillellan	9149		Tillellan Arthur Road	Wagin		
Cintramia	9150		Tillellan Arthur Road	Wagin		
Puntapin Homestead	9151		Bullock Hills Road	Wagin		
Rockleigh	9152		Norring-Dellyanine Road	Wagin		
Well Site	9153	Corner	Wagin & Arthur Roads	Wagin		
Hilton Park Homestead	9154		Baxters Road	Wagin		
Wards Homestead	9155		Ballaying South Road	Wagin		
Hyfield	9156		Bullock Hills Road	Wagin		
Belmont Homestead	9157		Dumbleyung Road	Wagin		
Alexander Galt & Co (former) Hardware	9158		Tudhoe Street	Wagin	Mitre 10	
Wagin Historical Village	9159		Kitchener Street	Wagin	Woodanilling National Bank, Argus Print, Norring Hall, Boyerine School	
Piesseville Honour Roll	10724		Piesseville Hall	Piesseville		
Noble's Crossing Road Bridge over Arthur River	13105		Noble Road, Wanaking Pool	Wagin	MRWA 3073	
Coblinine River Old Bridge	13108		Northam-Cranbrook Road 5 km S of	Wagin	MRWA 342 old	
Wesley Hall	15248		Ranford Street	Wagin		
Manse	15249	Corner	Trimdon & Traverse Streets	Wagin		
Railway House Group	15863	3, 5 &7	Ventnor Street	Wagin		
Wagin Police Station	17356		Upland Street	Wagin		
St George's Anglican Church Group, Wagin	18185	5	Tudhoe Street	Wagin		
C A Piesse Store & Family Housing, Wagin	18186		cnr Tudhoe & Bank Pl, Trenton Street, Lukin Street	Wagin		
House, 8 Trenton Street	18187			Wagin		
House, 5 Lukin Street	18188			Wagin		
House, 3 Lukin Street	18189			Wagin		
F & C Piesse Store (1890)	18190			Wagin		
St Joseph's Catholic Church, Wagin	23684		Arnott & Warwick Street	Wagin		
Old St Joseph's Primary School	24389		Vesper & Warwick Street	Wagin	Wagin Cottage Homes, St Joseph's Primary School	
House, 2 Etelowie Street, Wagin	24847	2	Etelowie Street	Wagin		
C A Piesse Workers Cottages, Wagin	25905	10-20	Ventnor Street	Wagin		
House, 88 Rifle St, Wagin	25931	88	Rifle Street	Wagin		
Puntapin Rock Catchment Dam Reserve	26014					
