= List of State Register of Heritage Places in the Shire of Narembeen =

List of heritage sites in Western Australia

The State Register of Heritage Places is maintained by the Heritage Council of Western Australia. As of 2026, 173 places are heritage-listed in the Shire of Narembeen, of which five are on the State Register of Heritage Places.

== List ==
The Western Australian State Register of Heritage Places, as of 2026, lists the following five state registered places within the Shire of Narembeen:

Place name	Place #	Street number	Street name	Suburb or town	Co-ordinates	Notes & former names	Photo
Narembeen Public Hall	1793	Corner	Latham & Longhurst Street	Narembeen	32.066037°S 118.395077°E	Memorial Hall, Town Hall	
Narembeen Museum	1794	30	Longhurst Street	Narembeen	32.066179°S 118.391429°E	St Pauls Anglican Church (former)	
Narembeen Civic Precinct	3629	2A	Longhurst Street	Narembeen	32.066138°S 118.394986°E	Lesser Hall, Road Board Building, Public Hall	
Narembeen Roads Board Building (former)	5862		Latham Road	Narembeen	32.066037°S 118.395244°E	Part of the Narembeen Civic Precinct (3629)	
Narembeen Lesser Hall	5876	2A	Longhurst Street	Narembeen	32.06611°S 118.3949°E	Agricultural Hall, Narembeen Hall Part of the Narembeen Civic Precinct (3629)	
