= List of State Register of Heritage Places in the Shire of Bruce Rock =

List of heritage sites in the Wheatbelt region of Western Australia

The State Register of Heritage Places is maintained by the Heritage Council of Western Australia. As of 2026, 210 places are heritage-listed in the Shire of Bruce Rock, of which four are on the State Register of Heritage Places.

== List ==
The Western Australian State Register of Heritage Places, as of 2026, lists the following four state registered places within the Shire of Bruce Rock:

Place name	Place #	Street number	Street name	Suburb or town	Co-ordinates	Notes & former names	Photo
Bruce Rock Hotel	320	30	Johnson Street	Bruce Rock	31.876934°S 118.148406°E	Bruce Rock State Hotel	
Bruce Rock Shire Offices	323	Corner	Johnson & Bath Street	Bruce Rock	31.879111°S 118.148409°E	Bruce Rock District Honour Rolls, Bruce Rock Roads Board Office	
Memorial House and Coronation Rose Garden	10644	35	Dunstal Street	Bruce Rock	31.873483°S 118.146941°E	Bruce Rock War Memorial Hospital, Frail Aged Lodge/ Facility/ Home, Memorial House	
Prisoner of War Hut	10652		Location 15920	Bruce Rock	31.924669°S 118.253545°E	Men's Room	
