= Babakin, Western Australia =

Babakin
- Town
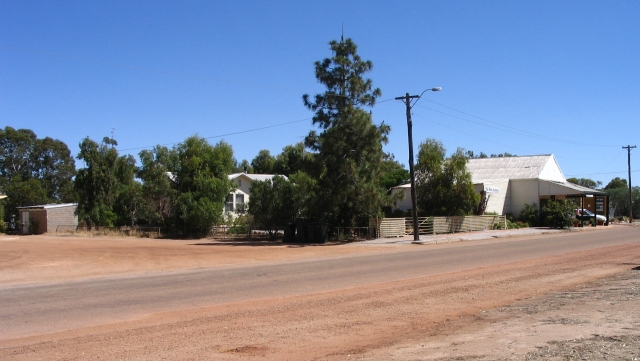
- Main street

- Interactive map of Babakin
- Coordinates: 32.12°S 118.024°E
- Country: Australia
- State: Western Australia
- LGA: Shire of Bruce Rock
- Location: 235 km (146 mi) E of Perth; 35 km (22 mi) SW of Bruce Rock; 29 km (18 mi) NE of Corrigin
- Established: 1914

Government
  - State electorate: Central Wheatbelt
  - Federal division: O'Connor

Area
  - Total: 381.5 km^{2} (147.3 sq mi)

Population
  - Total: 56 (SAL 2021)
- Postcode: 6428

Babakin is a small town located in the Wheatbelt region of Western Australia between the towns of Bruce Rock and Corrigin. At the 2021 census the population of Babakin was 56. Facilities in the town include a school, hall and sporting facilities.

Babakin was a pastoral lease from 1873 to 1914 at this location, first taken up by C. Heal (Jnr). The name stems from a Noongar term for the dingo. The population increased with land grants given to returned servicemen after the Great War.

In 1926, Babakin joined with Ardath to field an Australian rules team in the Bruce Rock Football Association.

In 1932, the Wheat Pool of Western Australia announced that the town would have two grain elevators, each fitted with an engine, installed at the railway siding.

A very rare plant species inhabits the area—the Western Underground Orchid (Rhizanthella gardneri).
