= Acacia rostellata =

Scientific classification
- Kingdom: Plantae
- Clade: Tracheophytes
- Clade: Angiosperms
- Clade: Eudicots
- Clade: Rosids
- Order: Fabales
- Family: Fabaceae
- Subfamily: Caesalpinioideae
- Clade: Mimosoid clade
- Genus: Acacia
- Species: A. rostellata

Binomial name
- Acacia rostellata Maslin
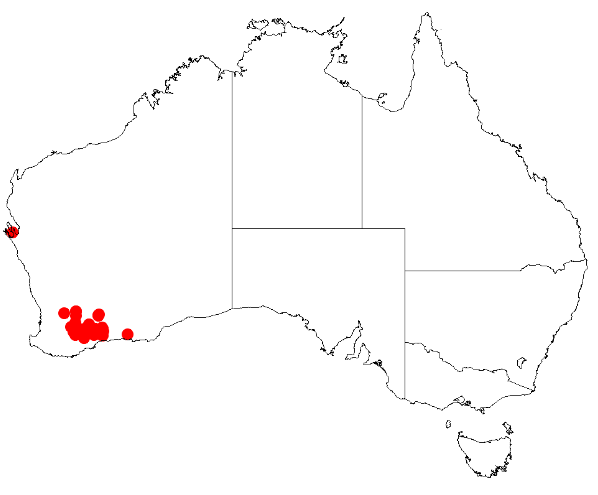
- Occurrence data from AVH

Species of legume

Acacia rostellata is a shrub of the genus Acacia and the subgenus Phyllodineae that is endemic to south western Australia

== Description ==
The low, spreading pungent shrub typically grows to a height of 0.1 to 0.5 metres (0 to 2 ft) it usually has many branches with pungent and hairy branchlets. Like most species of Acacia it has phyllodes rather than true leaves. The hairy evergreen phyllodes have an inequilaterally obtriangular to obdeltate shape with a length of 3 to 6 mm (0.12 to 0.24 in) and a width of 2 to 4 mm (0.079 to 0.157 in) with a more or less prominent main nerve. It blooms from August to November and produces green-yellow flowers.

== Distribution ==
It is native to an area in the Wheatbelt, Goldfields-Esperance and Great Southern regions of Western Australia growing in sand, sandy gravel or clay soils. It has a scattered distribution from around Bruce Rock in the north down to near Ongerup in the south and out as far as Lake King and Speddingup in the east. It is usually part of the heath under-storey open Eucalyptus scrubland communities.

== See also ==
- List of Acacia species
