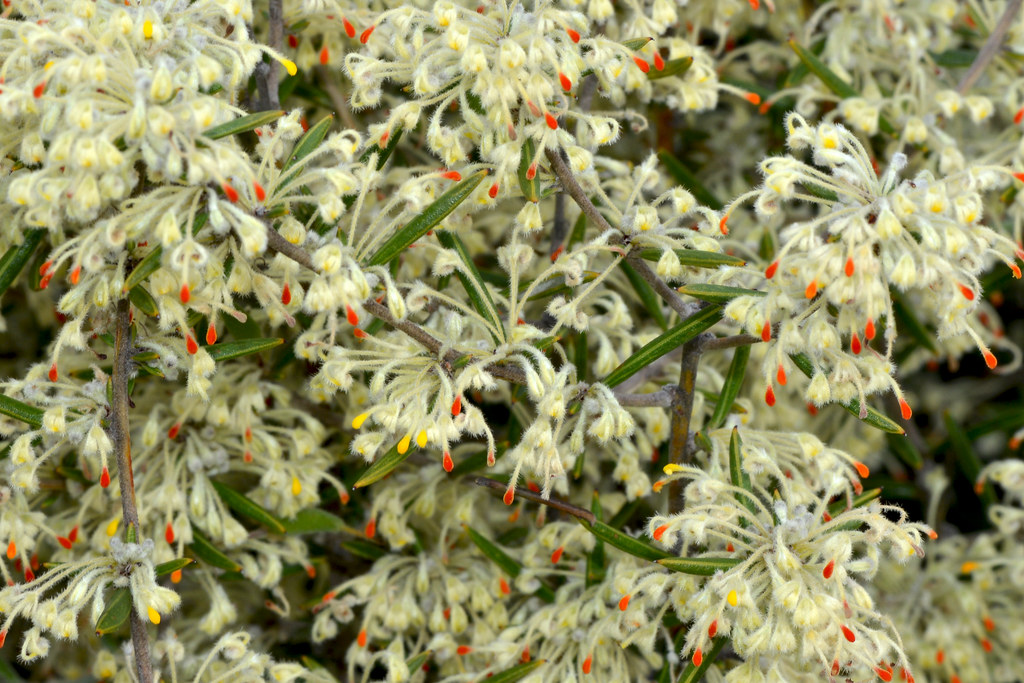

Conservation status
- Endangered (IUCN 3.1)

- Priority Three — Poorly Known Taxa (DEC)

Scientific classification
- Kingdom: Plantae
- Clade: Embryophytes
- Clade: Tracheophytes
- Clade: Spermatophytes
- Clade: Angiosperms
- Clade: Eudicots
- Order: Proteales
- Family: Proteaceae
- Genus: Grevillea
- Species: G. florida

Binomial name
- Grevillea florida (McGill.) Makinson

Synonyms
- Grevillea uncinulata subsp. florida McGill.

= Grevillea florida =

Species of shrub endemic to Western Australia

Grevillea florida is a species of flowering plant in the family Proteaceae and is endemic to the south-west of Western Australia. It is a erect, low shrub with linear to narrowly elliptic leaves, and clusters of hairy, white to creamy yellow flowers with a yellow- or orange-tipped style that ages to red.

== Description ==
Grevillea florida is an erect shrub that typically grows to a height of up to 1 m (3 ft 3 in). Its leaves are linear to narrowly elliptic, 5–30 mm (0.20–1.18 in) long and 1–3 mm (0.039–0.118 in) wide with the edges turned down or rolled under. The flowers are arranged in small groups, and are covered with white to creamy yellow hairs, the end of the style bright yellow or orange but turning red as the flowers age. The pistil is 7–10 mm (0.28–0.39 in) long. Flowering occurs from August to December and the fruit is an oblong or oval follicle about 13 mm (0.51 in) long.

== Taxonomy ==
This grevillea was first formally described in 1986 by Donald McGillivray who gave it the name Grevillea uncinulata subsp. florida in his book, New Names in Grevillea Proteaceae. In 2000, Robert Owen Makinson raised the subspecies to Grevillea florida in the Flora of Australia. The specific epithet (florida) means "flowery".

== Distribution and habitat ==
Grevillea florida grows in heath, shrubland or shrubby woodland between Perth, Wannamal, New Norcia, Badgingarra and Yoting in the Geraldton Sandplains, Jarrah Forest and Swan Coastal Plain biogeographic regions of south-western Western Australia.

== Conservation status ==
Grevillea florida is currently listed as endangered on the IUCN Red List of Threatened Species. Its distribution is severely restricted and fragmented, with its estimated extent of occurrence being 2,919 km^{2} (1,127 sq mi). Much of its habitat has been cleared for agriculture and road development, so the species is only known to persist in fragmented populations along roadside verges. Major threats to this species include land clearing for urban development, roadside verge clearance and competition with weeds. A population decline of at least 50% over the next 3 of the species' generational lengths (75 years) is inferred from additional habitat clearing for road development and maintenance. It is unknown if this species is susceptible to dieback, a disease caused by the plant pathogen Phythophthora.

It is also listed as 'Priority Three' by the Government of Western Australia Department of Biodiversity, Conservation and Attractions, meaning that it is poorly known and known from only a few locations but is not under imminent threat.

== See also ==
- List of Grevillea species
