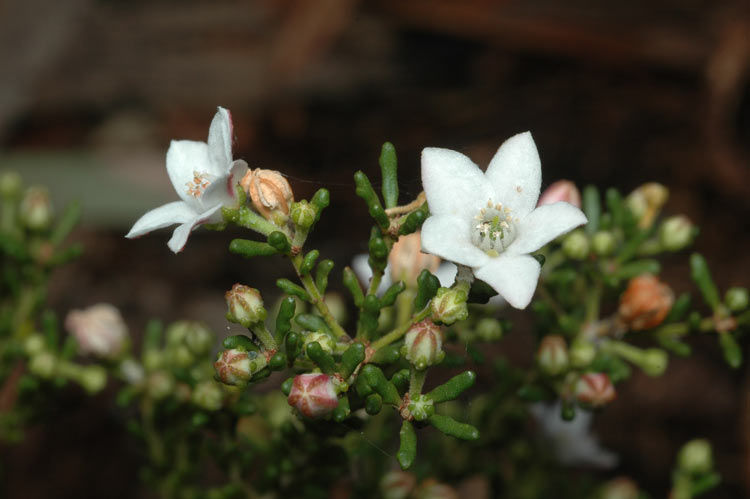
- In the Australian National Botanic Gardens

Scientific classification
- Kingdom: Plantae
- Clade: Embryophytes
- Clade: Tracheophytes
- Clade: Spermatophytes
- Clade: Angiosperms
- Clade: Eudicots
- Clade: Rosids
- Order: Sapindales
- Family: Rutaceae
- Genus: Philotheca
- Species: P. gardneri

Binomial name
- Philotheca gardneri (Paul G.Wilson) Paul G.Wilson

Synonyms
- Eriostemon gardneri Paul G.Wilson

= Philotheca gardneri =

Species of plant

Philotheca gardneri is a species of flowering plant in the family Rutaceae and is endemic to the south-west of Western Australia. It is a shrub with crowded, narrow club-shaped or more or less spherical leaves and white flowers with a prominent pink midrib, usually borne singly on the ends of branchlets.

== Description ==
Philotheca gardneri is a shrub that grows to a height of 1–1.5 m (3 ft 3 in – 4 ft 11 in) with corky branchlets. The leaves are cylindrical to narrow club-shaped, about 5–8 mm (0.20–0.31 in) long or more or less spherical and 1.5–2 mm (0.059–0.079 in) long. The flowers are usually borne singly on the ends of the branchlets, each flower on a fleshy pedicel 1–2 mm (0.039–0.079 in) long. There are five egg-shaped sepals about 1.5 mm (0.059 in) long and five egg-shaped white petals about 6 mm (0.24 in) long with a prominent pink midrib. The ten hairy stamens are free from each other. Flowering occurs from April to October.

== Taxonomy and naming ==
This philotheca was first formally described in 1970 by Paul Wilson who gave it the name Eriostemon gardneri and published the description in the journal Nuytsia from specimens collected by Charles Gardner near Jerramungup in 1939. In 1998, Wilson changed the name to Philotheca gardneri in the same journal and described two subspecies:

- Philotheca gardneri (A.Cunn. ex Endl.) Paul G. Wilson subsp. gardneri has narrow club-shaped leaves 5–8 mm (0.20–0.31 in) long;
- Philotheca gardneri subsp. globosa Paul G. Wilson has more or less spherical leaves 1.5–2 mm (0.059–0.079 in) long.

The specific epithet (gardneri) honours the collector of the type specimens, Charles Gardner and globosa refers to the shape of the leaves.

== Distribution and habitat ==
Subspecies gardneri grows in mallee and heath between Wagin, Howick Hill and Bruce Rock in the Coolgardie, Esperance Plains and Mallee biogeographic regions. Subspecies globosa grows in heath in a small area between Ravensthorpe and Norseman.

== Conservation status ==
Subspecies gardneri is classified as "not threatened" but subspecies globosa is listed as "Priority One" by the Government of Western Australia Department of Parks and Wildlife, meaning that it is known from only one or a few locations which are potentially at risk.
