= Patrick Conlon =

Patrick Conlon may refer to:

- Patrick Conlon (artist), American tattooist and comics illustrator
- Patrick Conlon (politician) (born 1959), Australian Labor Party politician
- Patrick Conlon, a member of the Maguire Seven
- Paddy Conlon (publican), Australian publican
- P. J. Conlon (born 1993), Irish-American baseball player
