= Erikin, Western Australia =

Erikin
- Town
- Interactive map of Erikin
- Coordinates: 31.933°S 117.883°E
- Country: Australia
- State: Western Australia
- LGA: Shire of Bruce Rock
- Location: 218 km (135 mi) E of Perth; 25 km (16 mi) W of Bruce Rock
- Established: 1921

Government
  - State electorate: Central Wheatbelt
  - Federal division: O'Connor
- Elevation: 243 m (797 ft)
- Postcode: 6418

Erikin is a small town located in the eastern Wheatbelt region of Western Australia. It is located close to the Salt River and between the towns of Quairading and Bruce Rock.

Originating as a railway siding that was established in 1913 during the construction of the Bruce Rock to Quairading railway line, the surrounding land was soon in demand. Lots were surveyed and the townsite was gazetted in 1921.

The town was named after the son of an early settler who was the first person of European descent to be born in the district, Eric Harvey. The second part of the name is short for Inn, or camping place, and was suggested by the child's mother in 1913.

The railway was expanded in 1914 with a new crane being constructed, the siding expanded and barracks provided. A school was operating in the town in 1914.
