= York railway station, Western Australia =

Disused railway station in York, Western Australia

York
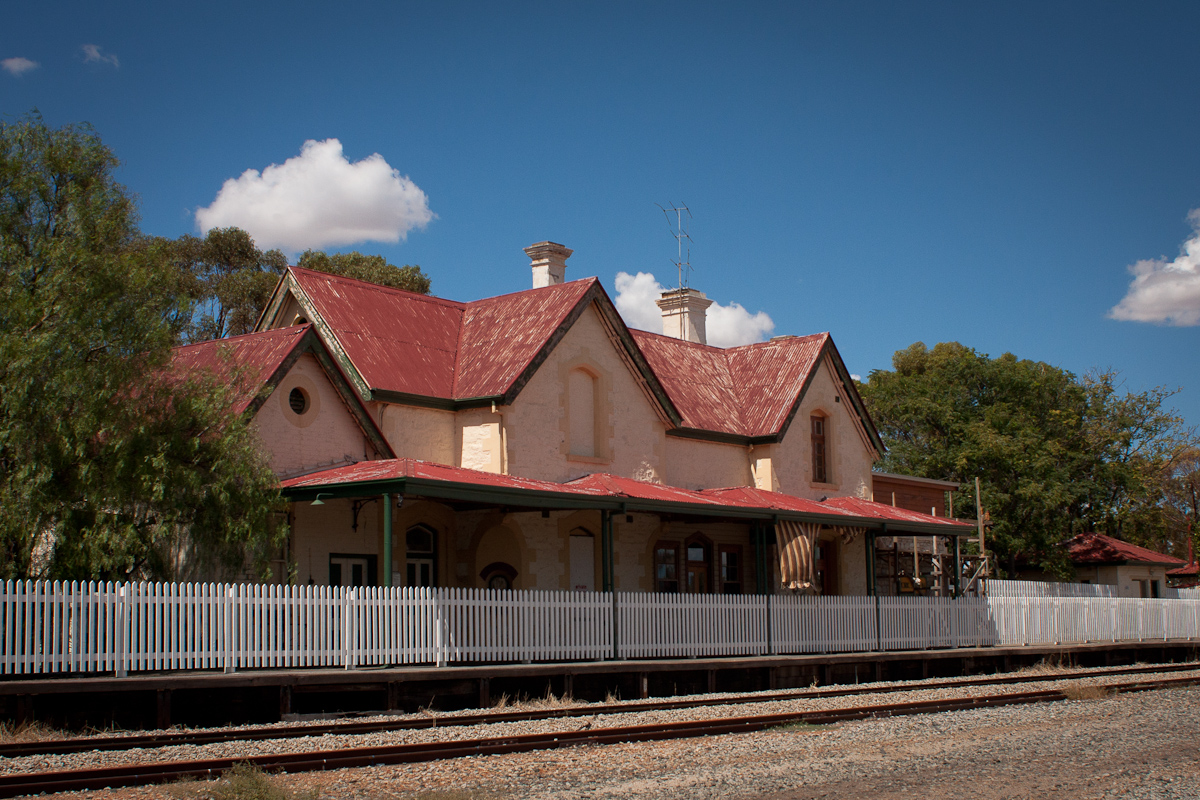
- York railway station in 2011

General information
- Location: Railway Street, York
- Coordinates: 31.891958°S 116.76582°E
- Owner: Westrail
- Operator: Westrail
- Distance: 161 kilometres from Perth
- Platforms: 1
- Tracks: 2

Construction
- Structure type: Ground

History
- Opened: 29 June 1885
- Closed: 1 December 1978

Western Australia Heritage Register
- Type: State Registered Place
- Designated: 7 December 2007
- Reference no.: 2899
Location

York railway station is a disused station on the Eastern Railway in Western Australia. It is located in the town of York.

== History ==
The York station opened on 29 June 1885 as the interim terminus of the Eastern Railway when it was extended from Chidlow's Well. York became a junction station with a line opened south to Beverley on 5 August 1886 to connect with the Great Southern Railway from Albany.

On 29 June 1885, Walkinshaw Cowan was invited to give a speech at the extension of the railway line to York. He said:

This is a day of great rejoicing for York, and for the Colony, but for none more than myself. I came to this district in 1848 – 37 years ago this year – as Guardian of Natives, having the police under me. The country was a wilderness of bush, with only a few mud houses in York, and only one or two children, of which Mr Henry Parker, Member for Perth, was one, and who has been such an honor to the district. I had to visit the district from the Williams River to Dundaragan (sic), including Gingin and Bindoon. The settlers’ houses were wretched mud buildings, and I had to sleep in the open air or in a shepherd’s hut. The roads were mere bush tracks, and the settlers, both masters and men, had to cart their produce from 60 to 100 miles, over them, in the dust and heat in summer, and through bogs and ruts in wet winter. A universal gloom seemed to pervade the district. I often said I never heard a ploughman here whistle to his ploughs at home, I only recollect hearing one man whistle, and that was an Irishman. The only road party at the time was a gang of native prisoners. They were clearing along the line marked out by Mr Gregory towards Mr Hoops; I was riding on before through the bush to see the work that had to be done, and when I came to the top of a hill I heard a lively tune being whistled. I pulled up, and presently a pair of kangaroo dogs rushed up, followed by a small man on an active little half-bred Timor pony. It is very pleasant witnessing the gradual clearing and opening up of a new country. I have seen the mud houses give way to good substantial edifices, and have seen York grow into the beautiful town that it is; but I never dreamt of seeing this crowning improvement to the Railway to York.

The single fare from Perth to York was 5 shillings and the return fare was 7 shillings and sixpence.

The initial result of all this railway construction was to throw open the Avon Valley and land to the east to commercial wheat farming on a large scale. The railway brought with it first construction workers, then railway employees and settlers to swell the population of York and the Avon Valley. Next came the gold-seekers. Between 1890 and 1894 they came from Albany and Fremantle to York by train, stocked up with provisions and set off by cart or on foot for the Goldfields, using the track and wells established by Charles Cooke Hunt during 1865/66.

The Bruce Rock line opened east to Greenhills on 1 September 1898, being extended to Quairading on 24 April 1908 and Bruce Rock on 28 March 1913. It was cut back to Quairading in the 1990s and closed entirely in October 2013.

When the Eastern Railway was extended to Southern Cross in 1894, it was done so via Northam rather than York even though it was the largest inland town in Western Australia at the time. In 1906, the station was extended. In 1977, it was classified by the National Trust.

The Albany Progress utilised the station until the service ceased in December 1978.

== Railway Station Master’s Quarters ==
The Railway Station Master’s Quarters were designed by George Temple-Poole and would have been one his first buildings after he was appointed as Principal Architect in June 1885.

The building is possibly the earliest example of Federation Arts and Crafts style in Australia, emulating William Morris, for whom the ideal in house design was to copy the “ageless domestic architecture” of Bibury in Gloucestershire, a Cotswald hamlet. Temple-Poole has designed the Railway Station Quarters like a Cotswald cottage:

- small in scale, homely and domestic
- using two locally made materials with contrasting colours and textures, stone and brick
- high pitched roofs
- irregular positioned windows
- taller than usual chimneys
- protruding eaves
- twin gables

The building is now a private residence.
