= South Kumminin =

Town in the Wheatbelt region of Western Australia

- Town
- Coordinates: 32°12′00″S 118°20′00″E
- Country: Australia
- State: Western Australia
- LGA: Shire of Narembeen
- Location: 282 km (175 mi) east of Perth; 16 km (9.9 mi) south of Narembeen; 34 km (21 mi) north of Kondinin
- Established: 1921

Government
  - State electorate: Central Wheatbelt
  - Federal division: O'Connor
- Elevation: 296 m (971 ft)
- Postcode: 6368

South Kumminin in a small town in the Shire of Narembeen in the Wheatbelt region of Western Australia.

The name is Indigenous Australian in origin but its meaning is unknown. The town is located along the Merredin to Yilliminning railway line. When the railway line opened in 1917 a siding was opened where the townsite is located named Arrowsmith. The name was changed later that year to South Kumminin and lots were surveyed in 1918. The townsite was gazetted in 1921.

The surrounding areas produce wheat and other cereal crops. The town is a receival site for Cooperative Bulk Handling.
