= Kwolyin, Western Australia =

Kwolyin
- Town
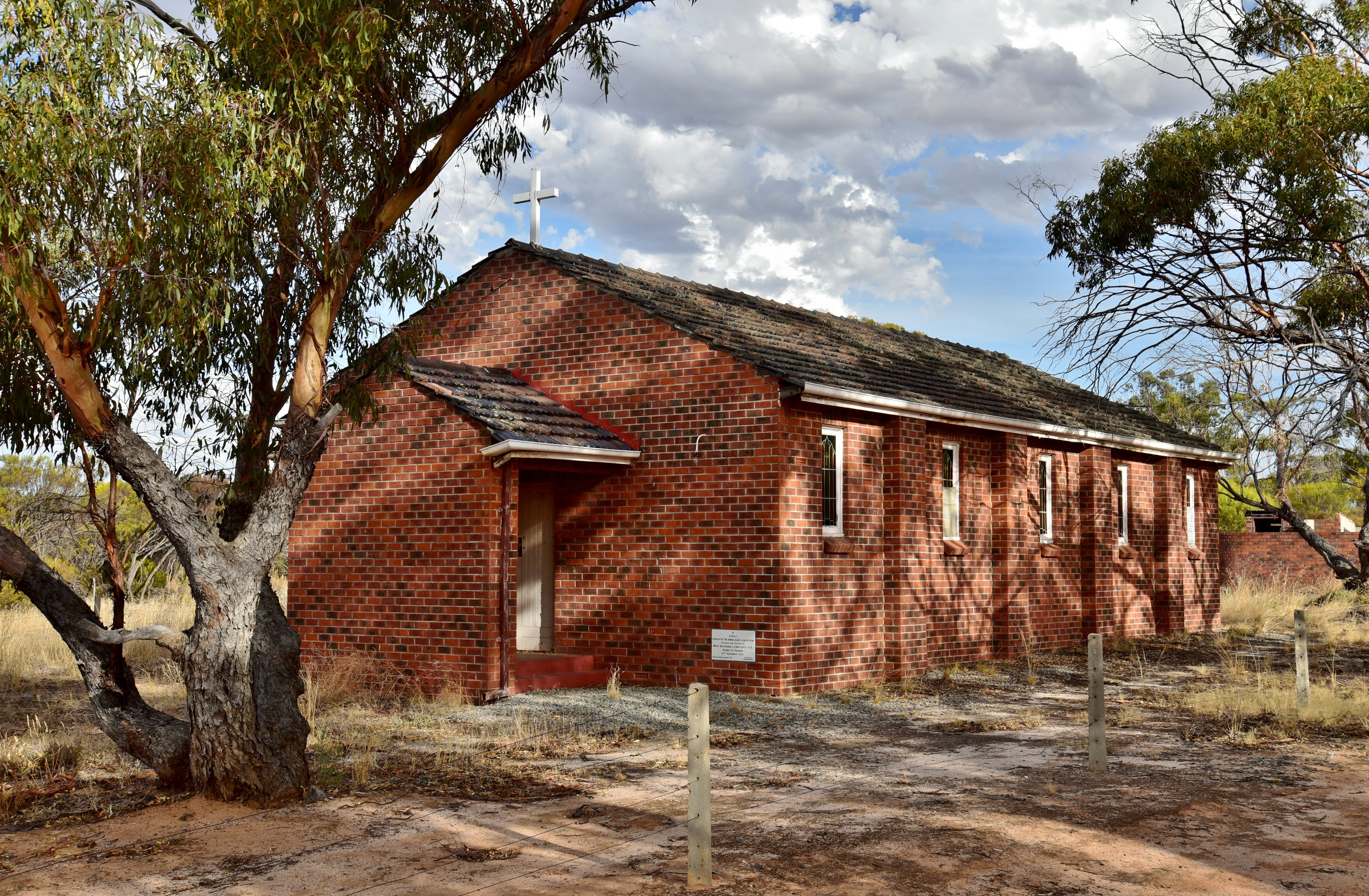
- Church of the Immaculate Conception, Kwolyin, 2018

- Coordinates: 31°56′S 117°46′E
- Country: Australia
- State: Western Australia
- LGA(s): Shire of Bruce Rock
- Location: 203 km (126 mi) east of Perth; 33 km (21 mi) south of Kellerberrin; 70 km (43 mi) south west of Merredin
- Established: 1913

Government
  - State electorate(s): Central Wheatbelt
  - Federal division(s): O'Connor

Area
  - Total: 343.1 km^{2} (132.5 sq mi)
- Elevation: 280 m (920 ft)

Population
  - Total(s): 20 (SAL 2021)
- Postcode: 6385

Kwolyin is a small town in the Wheatbelt region of Western Australia.

The first European to visit the area, in 1864, was the explorer Charles Cooke Hunt, who charted a large granite hill in the area by its Indigenous Australian name of Qualyin Hill. The meaning of the name is unknown.

By 1908 the area had been settled and the local progress association requested that the government declare a townsite along the Quairading to Nunagin railway line that was being proposed.

The townsite was selected in 1912 due to its position near Coaring Spring and the townsite was gazetted in 1913, the same year the railway was opened. The station was initially named as Koarin but later renamed as Kwolyin. Kwolyin's State Hotel was constructed in 1914. It was destroyed by arson in February 1992. The gutted hotel building was demolished in 1992.
