= Merredin to Narrogin railway line =

Railway line in Western Australia

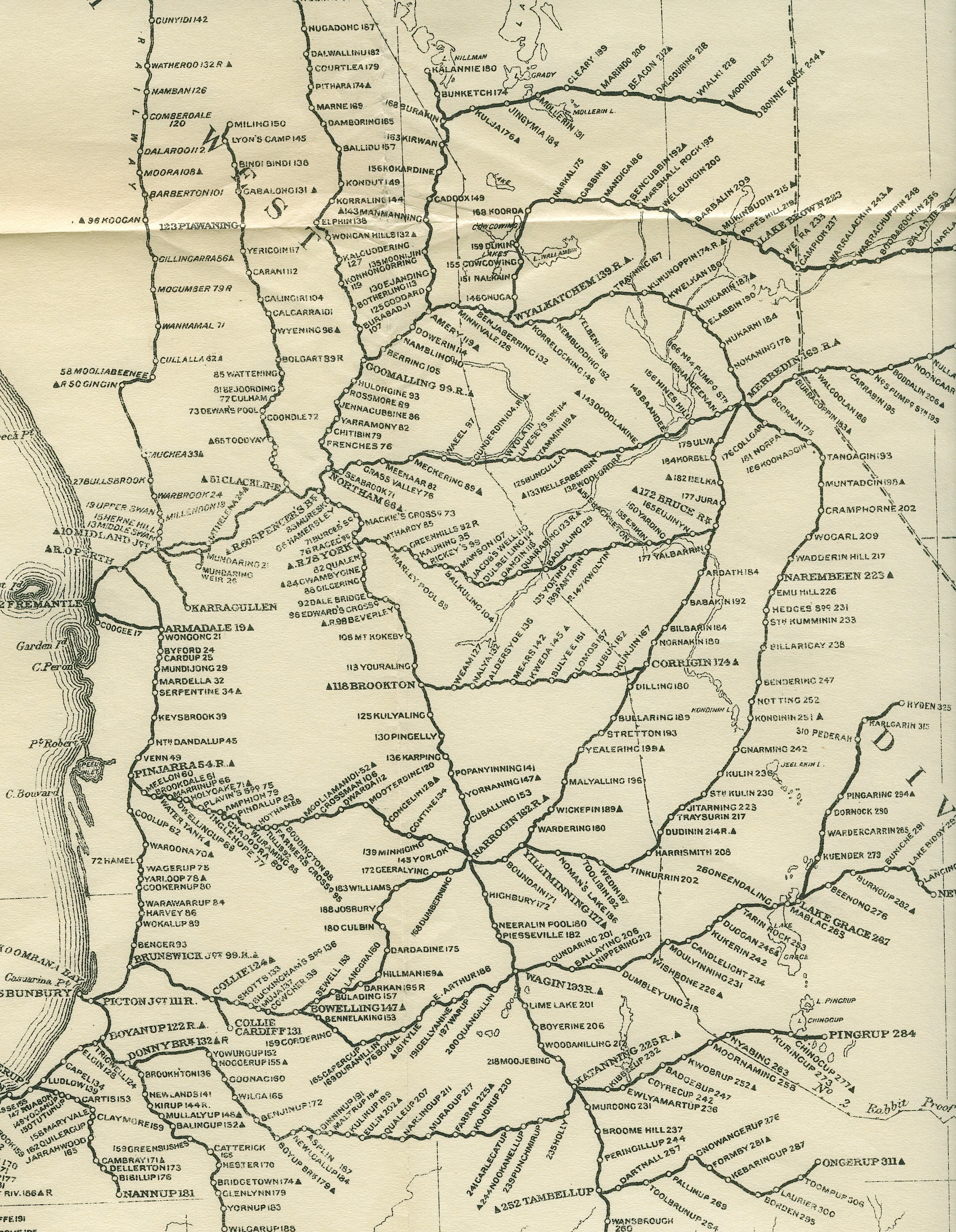
- The Merredin to Narrogin line is right-of-centre on the map.

Overview
- Status: Closed
- Locale: Wheatbelt, Western Australia
- Termini: Merredin; Narrogin

Service
- Operator(s): Western Australian Government Railways

History
- Commenced: 1908
- Opened: 14 September 1914

Technical
- Line length: 216 km (134 mi)
- Track gauge: 1,067 mm (3 ft 6 in)
- Merredin to Narrogin railway line Main locations

The Merredin to Narrogin railway line was a railway line in the Wheatbelt region of Western Australia, between Merredin and Narrogin. The line was also known as the West Merredin to Narrogin via Corrigin railway.

== History ==
The Narrogin–Wickepin Railway Act 1907, an act by the Parliament of Western Australia granted assent on 20 December 1907, authorised the construction of the railway line from Narrogin to Wickepin. A second act, the Wickepin–Merredin Railway Act 1911, assented to in 16 February 1911, authorised the construction of the railway line extension from Wickepin to Merredin.

The line was built in separate sections over five years:

- Narrogin to Wickepin - 16 February 1909
- Bruce Rock to Merredin - 22 December 1913
- Wickepin to Corrigin - 8 June 1914
- Corrigin to Bruce Rock - 14 September 1914

It was constructed by the Western Australian Public Works Department.

It connected the Great Southern Railway route with the Eastern Railway.

The link via Corrigin was 216 kilometres (134 mi) long.

Arc Infrastructure deems the railway line to be part of its Grain Freight Rail Network, which, in 2017, accounted for 50 percent of its network but only 10 percent of its freight. The entire Merredin to Narrogin line was classified as Tier 3.

In 2021, it was estimated that it would cost A$317.3 million to upgrade the Narrogin to Merredin railway line to reopen it.

== Alternate route via Kondinin ==
A second railway route between Merredin and Narrogin existed further east, via Kondinin. The official name of this line was the West Merredin to Yilliminning via Kondinin railway. It joined the West Merredin to Narrogin via Corrigin railway at Yilliminning, 23 kilometres (14 mi) east of Narrogin.

== Legacy ==
The two railway lines running in parallel between Merredin to Narrogin still exist, but are designated as "Not in use" on the Arc Infrastructure map in 2024. The status as Tier 3 lines has been discussed irregularly in the 2000s. At the southern terminus of the line, the Narrogin Railway Station, built in 1907, is on the Western Australian State Register of Heritage Places. The heritage listed installations at Narrogin also include a goods shed, a signal cabin, a foot bridge and a number of associated houses.

The heritage listed Wickepin Railway Precinct dates back to 1909, when the railway from Narrogin to Wickepin was completed. Apart from the railway station it also includes a goods sheet, a water tank and loading yards and a ramp. Also heritage listed within the Shire of Wickepin are the Yealering Railway siding and the site of the former Toolibin Railway siding.

The Railway Water Tank at Corrigin is listed on the State Register of Heritage Places and part of the larger and also heritage listed Corrigin Railway Precinct. Also within the Shire of Corrigin are the heritage listed Bilbarin Railway Reserve group, which consist of sheep yards, a bagged wheat depot and a goods sheet.

In the Shire of Bruce Rock, a number of sites of the former railway line are on the shire's heritage list: the Bruce Rock Railway Station precinct, the Ardath Railway precinct, Babakin and Kwolyin railway sidings, and the site of the Belka Railway Reserve. Bruce Rock itself was an important railway junction as the Narrogin to Merredin line intersected the York–Bruce Rock railway line there.

At the northern terminus, at Merredin, four entries related to the railways are on the State Register of Heritage Places: the Merredin Railway Station, the Railway Water Tank, the Railway Dam and the Railway Housing Precinct.
