= Shackleton, Western Australia =

Town in the Wheatbelt region in Western Australia

Shackleton
- Town
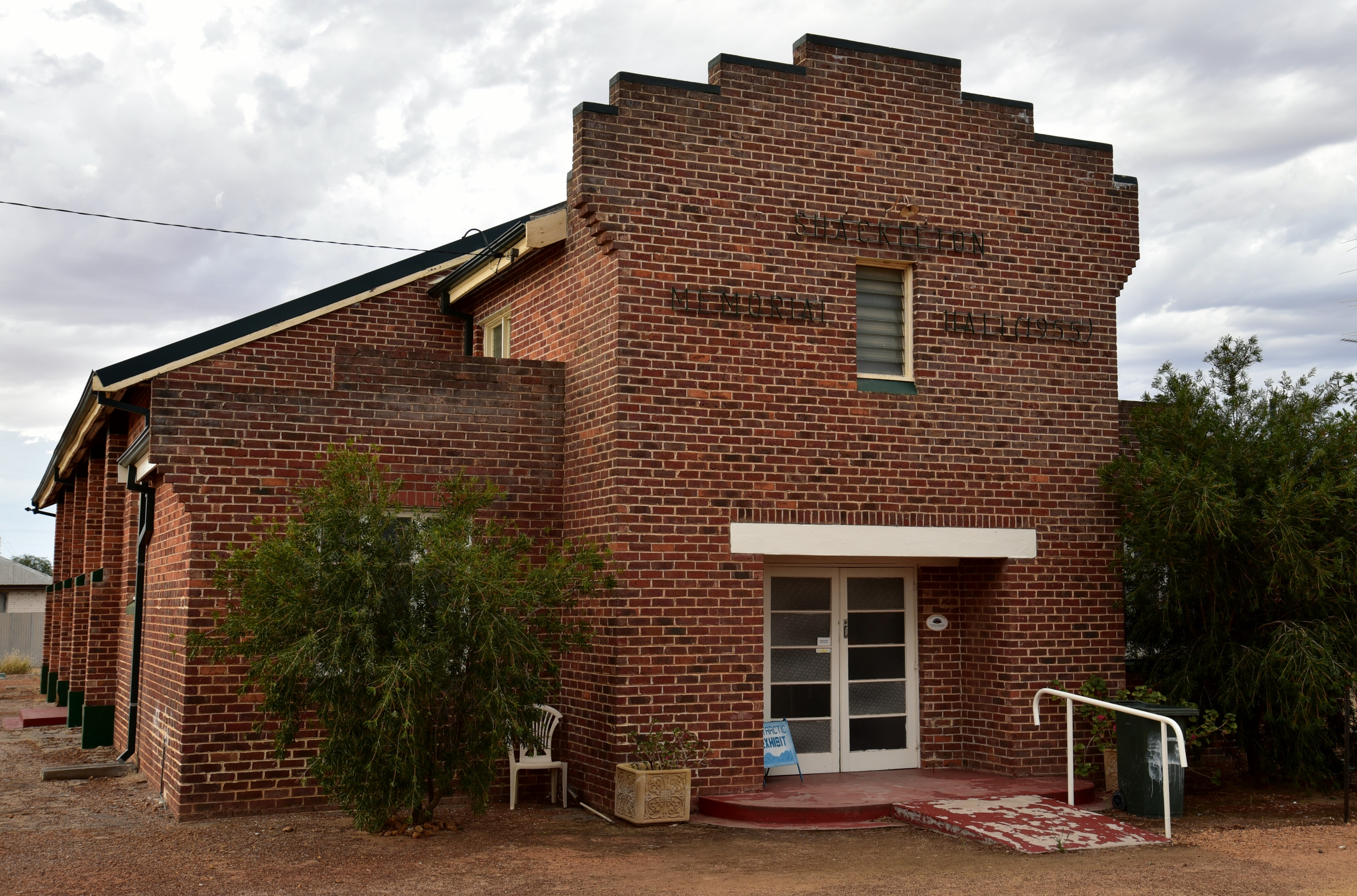
- Shackleton Memorial Hall, 2018

- Interactive map of Shackleton
- Coordinates: 31°56′00″S 117°50′00″E
- Country: Australia
- State: Western Australia
- LGA: Shire of Bruce Rock
- Location: 210 km (130 mi) east of Perth; 30 km (19 mi) west of Bruce Rock; 36 km (22 mi) south of Kellerberrin
- Established: 1951

Government
  - State electorate: Central Wheatbelt
  - Federal division: O'Connor

Area
  - Total: 533.8 km^{2} (206.1 sq mi)
- Elevation: 249 m (817 ft)

Population
  - Total: 114 (SAL 2021)
- Postcode: 6386

Shackleton is a small town in the Wheatbelt region of Western Australia.

The town is located close to the Salt River and along the disused railway line between Bruce Rock and Quairading.

The 2016 population was 96.

Originally a railway siding for the railway line when constructed in 1913, the town was developed privately before being gazetted in 1951. The town is named after the Antarctic explorer Ernest Shackleton.

The local Agricultural Hall was officially opened in 1920 by Mr. H. Griffiths MLA; it was built on land provided by Dr. Germyn.

The Bankwest branch in the town claimed to be the world's smallest bank. The building measures 3 by 4 metres (10 by 13 ft), but was closed in 1997.

The surrounding areas produce wheat and other cereal crops. The town is a receival site for Cooperative Bulk Handling.

The town had an Australian rules football team from 1925 to 1970 before it disbanded.
