= Bilbarin, Western Australia =

Bilbarin
- Town
- Interactive map of Bilbarin
- Coordinates: 32°12′21″S 117°57′08″E
- Country: Australia
- State: Western Australia
- LGA: Shire of Corrigin
- Location: 246 km (153 mi) ESE of Perth; 16 km (9.9 mi) NNW of Corrigin; 86 km (53 mi) SSW of Merredin
- Established: 1914

Government
  - State electorate: Central Wheatbelt
  - Federal division: O’Connor

Area
  - Total: 182.3 km^{2} (70.4 sq mi)
- Elevation: 290 m (950 ft)

Population
  - Total: 18 (SAL 2021)
- Postcode: 6375

Bilbarin is a small town in the Shire of Corrigin in the Wheatbelt region of Western Australia.

The townsite is located along the railway line between Corrigin and Bruce Rock. The Bilbarin rail infrastructure, part of the Merredin to Narrogin railway line, at one point consisted of sheep yards, a bagged wheat depot, a goods shed, overnight stock yards and the weighbridge, but nothing now remains of the former facilities.

The town was originally gazetted in 1914 but with the name of Wogerlin, which was changed to Bilbarin in 1916. Bilbarin is the Aboriginal name of a local water source.

During a violent storm in 1928 many farmers houses were destroyed and the local hall was blown over. The Westralian Farmers' wheat shed was unroofed and the railway station was also damaged. Steel telephone poles were broken off and many kilometres of telephone lines were downed. Over 0.56 inches (14 mm) of rain fell in just a few minutes during the storm.

In 1932 the Wheat Pool of Western Australia announced that the town would have two grain elevators, each fitted with an engine, installed at the railway siding.
