= Belka, Western Australia =

Belka
- Town
- Interactive map of Belka
- Coordinates: 31.73°S 118.167°E
- Country: Australia
- State: Western Australia
- LGA: Shire of Bruce Rock
- Location: 261 km (162 mi) E of Perth; 16 km (9.9 mi) N of Bruce Rock
- Established: 1914

Government
  - State electorate: Central Wheatbelt
  - Federal division: O'Connor

Belka is a small town located in the Wheatbelt region of Western Australia between the towns of Bruce Rock and Merredin.

The town originated as a station along the railway line for both passengers and heavy goods, and was gazetted in 1914. The word is Aboriginal in origin and is thought to mean ankle. A town hall was built in 1915 and a dam was also completed in the same year.
