= Paddy Conlon (publican) =

Australian publican

Paddy Conlon (fl. c. 1925) was an Australian publican who founded the town of Narembeen, Western Australia.

While a publican in Perth, Conlon and a lawyer friend, Henry Dale, recognised a commercial opportunity to sell alcohol at the railway siding of Narembeen near the teetotal town of Emu Hill. The partners bought land by the railway in 1924, gained a license to build a pub, and then sold off building plots around their new drinking establishment. The new settlement of Narembeen grew at the expense of Emu Hill.
