= Shire of Narembeen =

Local government area in the Wheatbelt region of Western Australia

Coordinates: 32°03′47″S 118°23′46″E

- Local government area
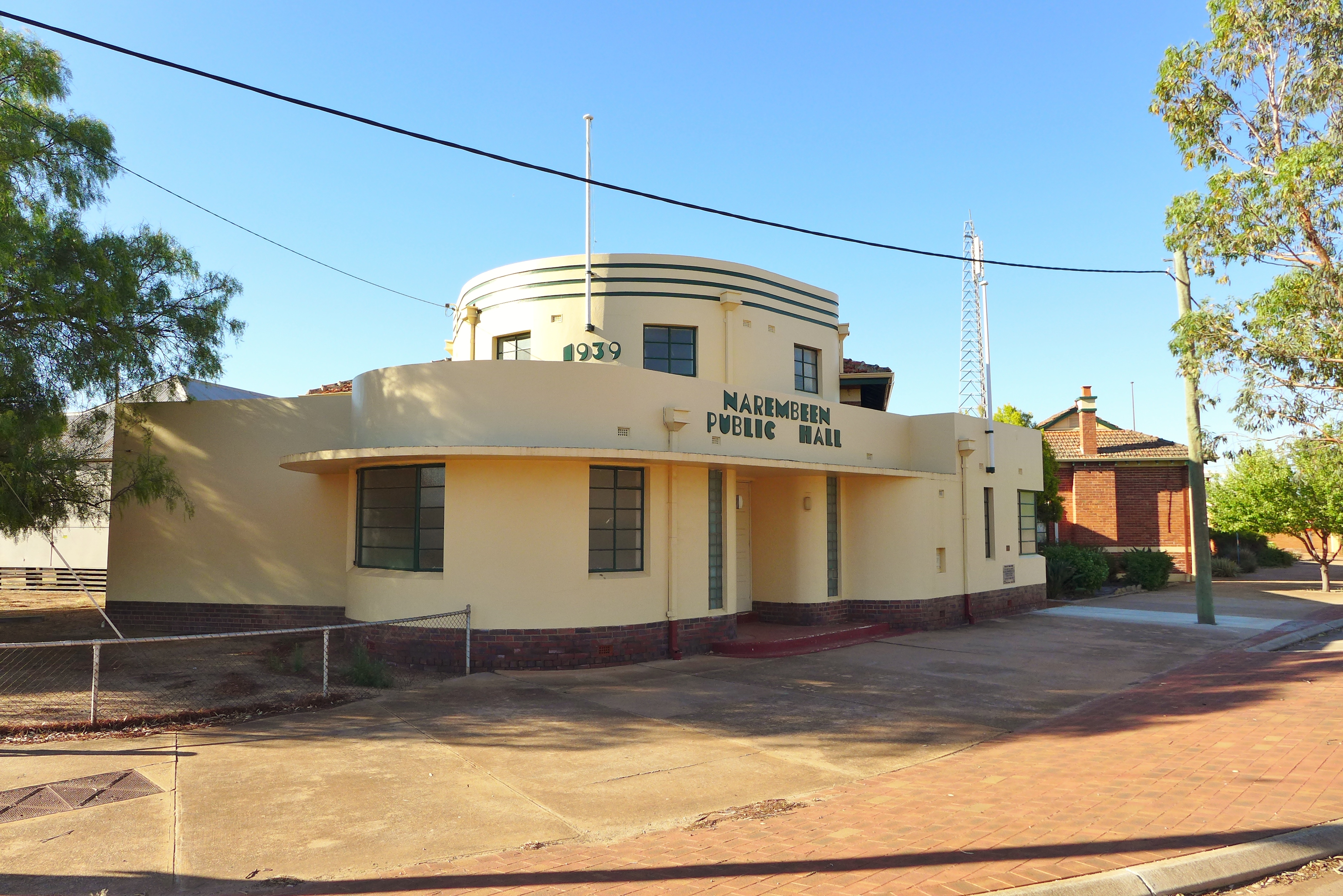
- The state heritage listed Narembeen Public Hall, 2014

- Interactive map of Shire of Narembeen
- Country: Australia
- State: Western Australia
- Region: Wheatbelt
- Council seat: Narembeen

Government
  - Shire President: Kellie Mortimore
  - State electorate: Central Wheatbelt
  - Federal division: O'Connor

Area
  - Total: 3,832.9 km^{2} (1,479.9 sq mi)

Population
  - Total: 787 (LGA 2021)
- Website: Shire of Narembeen
LGAs around Shire of Narembeen
Bruce Rock	Merredin	Yilgarn
Bruce Rock	Shire of Narembeen	Yilgarn
Corrigin	Kondinin	Kondinin

The Shire of Narembeen is a local government area in the eastern Wheatbelt region of Western Australia, about 300 kilometres (186 mi) east of the state capital, Perth, and between the shires of Merredin to the north, and Kondinin to the south. The Shire has a land area of 3,833 square kilometres (1,480 sq mi) and its seat of government is the town of Narembeen.

== History ==
The Narembeen Road District was gazetted on 6 June 1924. On 1 July 1961, it became a shire following the passage of the Local Government Act 1960, which reformed all remaining road districts into shires.

== Towns and localities ==
The towns and localities of the Shire of Narembeen with population and size figures based on the most recent Australian census:

Locality	Population	Area	Map
Cramphorne	43 (SAL 2021)	716.4 km^{2} (276.6 sq mi)	
Mount Walker	76 (SAL 2021)	661.8 km^{2} (255.5 sq mi)	
Narembeen	423 (SAL 2021)	1 km^{2} (0.39 sq mi)	
South Kumminin	85 (SAL 2021)	939.7 km^{2} (362.8 sq mi)	
Wadderin	100 (SAL 2021)	671.3 km^{2} (259.2 sq mi)	
West Holleton	36 (SAL 2021)	431.4 km^{2} (166.6 sq mi)	
Woolocutty	34 (SAL 2021)	410.6 km^{2} (158.5 sq mi)	

== Heritage-listed places ==
As of 2023, 172 places are heritage-listed in the Shire of Narembeen, of which five are on the State Register of Heritage Places.
