= Shire of Wagin =

Local government area in Western Australia

Coordinates: 33°18′50″S 117°20′38″E

- Local government area
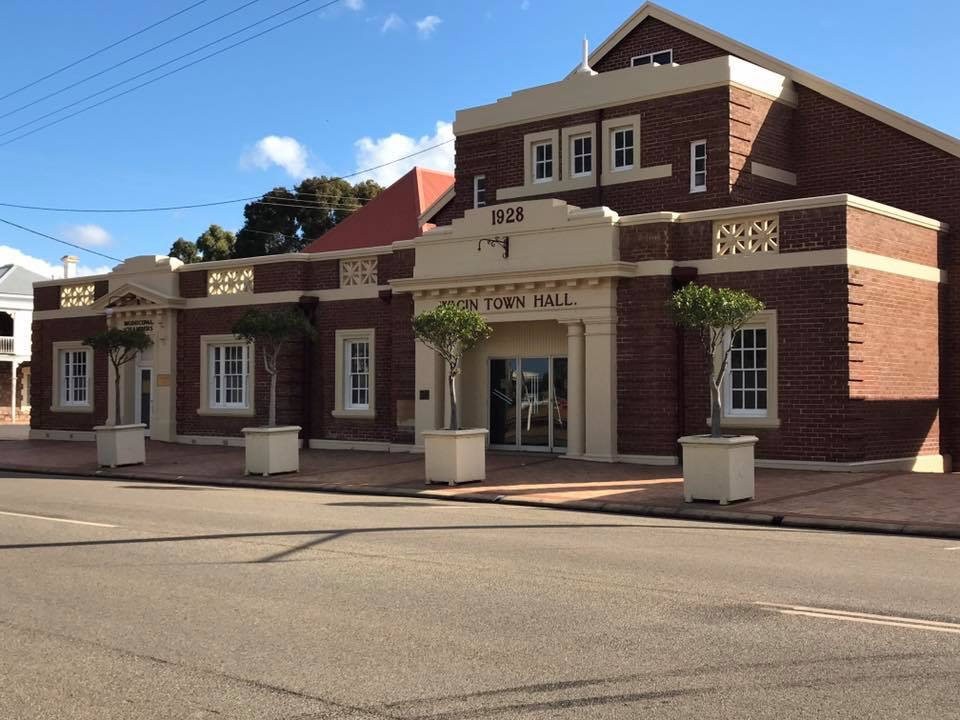
- The state heritage listed Wagin Town Hall, 2017

- Interactive map of Shire of Wagin
- Country: Australia
- State: Western Australia
- Region: Wheatbelt
- Established: 1887
- Council seat: Wagin

Government
  - Shire President: Phillip Blight
  - State electorate: Roe
  - Federal division: O'Connor

Area
  - Total: 1,945.7 km^{2} (751.2 sq mi)

Population
  - Total: 1,761 (LGA 2021)
- Website: Shire of Wagin
LGAs around Shire of Wagin
Williams	Narrogin	Wickepin
West Arthur	Shire of Wagin	Dumbleyung
West Arthur	Woodanilling	Katanning

The Shire of Wagin is a local government area in the Wheatbelt region of Western Australia, about 230 kilometres (143 mi) southeast of the state capital, Perth. The Shire covers an area of about 1,948 square kilometres (752 sq mi), and its seat of government is the town of Wagin.

== History ==
It was first established as the Arthur Road District on 10 February 1887. It was renamed the Wagin Road District on 10 February 1905.

The Wagin township was severed from the road district as the Municipality of Wagin on 27 July 1906, but was amalgamated back into the road district on 15 April 1961, with the creation of a new Town Ward.

It was declared a shire and named the Shire of Wagin with effect from 1 July 1961 following the passage of the Local Government Act 1960, which reformed all remaining road districts into shires.

== Wards ==
The shire was divided into wards until 1991, but wards were abolished and councillors now sit at large. As of 2014 there were 11 councillors. Following further changes to legislation, this was changed to 7.

== Towns and localities ==
The towns and localities of the Shire of Wagin with population and size figures based on the most recent Australian census:

Locality	Population	Area	Map
Ballaying	33 (SAL 2021)	166.9 km^{2} (64.4 sq mi)	
Cancanning	35 (SAL 2021)	251.2 km^{2} (97.0 sq mi)	
Collanilling	17 (SAL 2021)	113.1 km^{2} (43.7 sq mi)	
Gundaring	5 (SAL 2021)	95.5 km^{2} (36.9 sq mi)	
Jaloran	41 (SAL 2021)	199.5 km^{2} (77.0 sq mi)	
Lime Lake	16 (SAL 2016)	113 km^{2} (44 sq mi)	
Minding	32 (SAL 2021)	148.9 km^{2} (57.5 sq mi)	
Piesseville	49 (SAL 2021)	249.9 km^{2} (96.5 sq mi)	
Wagin	1,448 (SAL 2021)	251.1 km^{2} (97.0 sq mi)	
Wedgecarrup	80 (SAL 2021)	356.9 km^{2} (137.8 sq mi)	

== Population ==
Historical population

Year	Pop.	±% p.a.
1911	2,006	—
1921	2,323	+1.48%
1933	2,363	+0.14%
1947	1,734	−2.19%
1954	2,559	+5.72%
1961	2,627	+0.38%
1966	2,774	+1.09%
1971	2,427	−2.64%
1976	2,456	+0.24%

Year	Pop.	±% p.a.
1981	2,397	−0.49%
1986	2,226	−1.47%
1991	1,932	−2.79%
1996	1,862	−0.74%
2001	1,725	−1.52%
2006	1,846	+1.37%
2011	1,847	+0.01%
2016	1,852	+0.05%
2021	1,761	−1.00%

== Notable councillors ==
- Charles Piesse, Arthur Roads Board chairman 1887–1890; later a state MP
- Winifred Piesse, Shire of Wagin councillor 1971–1977; later a state MP

== Heritage-listed places ==
As of 2023, 92 places are heritage-listed in the Shire of Wagin, of which eight are on the State Register of Heritage Places.
