= Ardath, Western Australia =

Town in the Wheatbelt region of Western Australia

Ardath
- Town
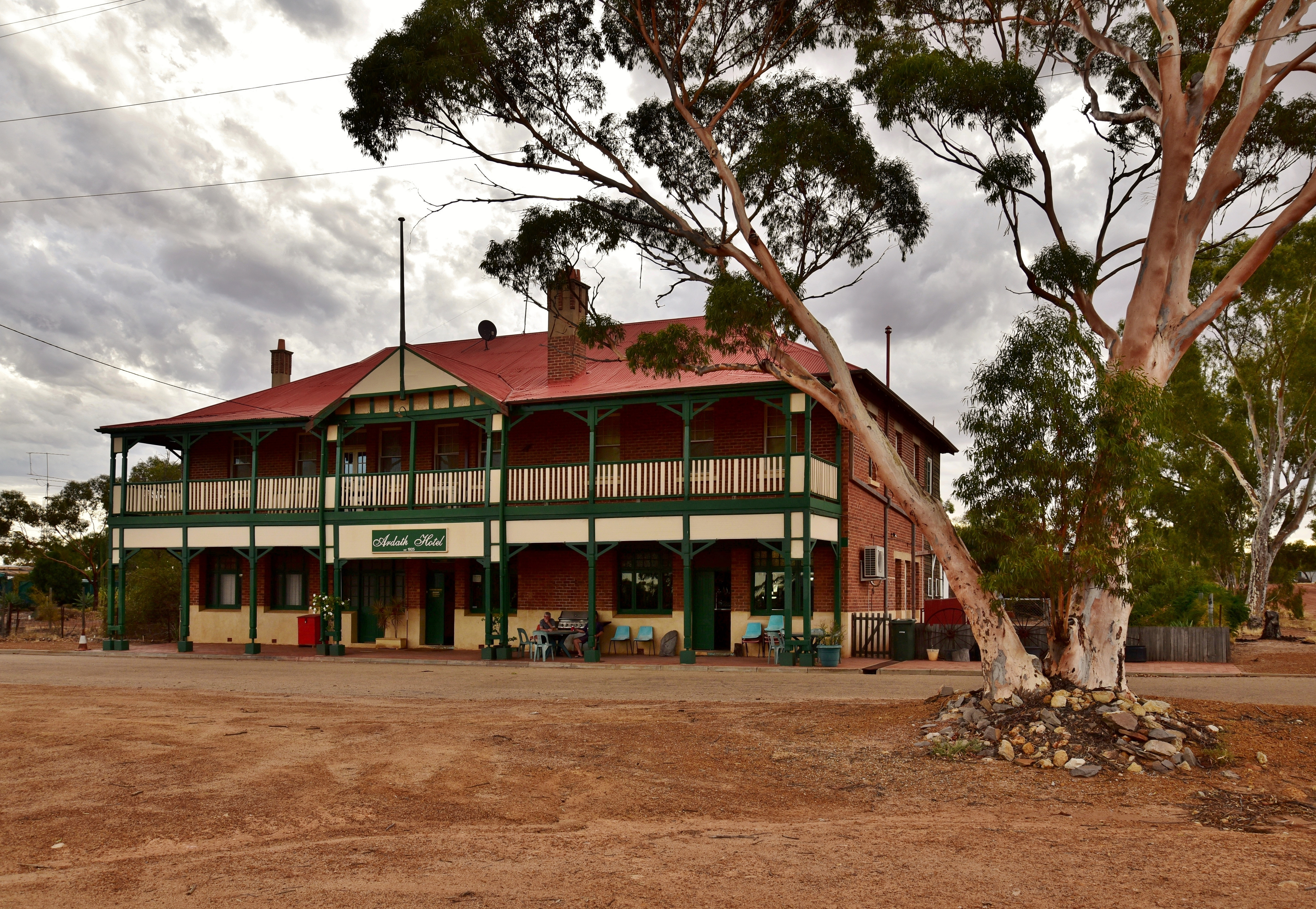
- Ardath Hotel, 2018

- Coordinates: 32°01′52″S 118°05′38″E
- Country: Australia
- State: Western Australia
- LGA(s): Shire of Bruce Rock
- Location: 255 km (158 mi) E of Perth; 20 km (12 mi) S of Bruce Rock; 48 km (30 mi) NE of Corrigin
- Established: 1914

Government
  - State electorate(s): Central Wheatbelt
  - Federal division(s): O'Connor

Area
  - Total: 358.2 km^{2} (138.3 sq mi)
- Elevation: 219 m (719 ft)

Population
  - Total(s): 51 (SAL 2021)
- Postcode: 6419

Ardath is a small town in the Wheatbelt region of Western Australia 20 kilometres (12 mi) south of the town of Bruce Rock.

It was built to serve the Corrigin to Bruce Rock railway, part of the Merredin to Narrogin railway line, and originally named Kerkenin in April 1914. However, confusion with Kukerin saw its name changed to Ardath, after the name of a prophet in the apocryphal 2 Esdras.

The surrounding areas produce wheat and other cereal crops. The town is a receival site for Cooperative Bulk Handling.

In 1932 the Wheat Pool of Western Australia announced that the town would have two grain elevators, each fitted with an engine, installed at the railway siding.

A bulk wheat bin was built in the town in and opened in December 1940. The total delivery for the first season was 203,648 bushels with 242 tons being received on a single day.

== Military history ==
During World War II Ardath was the location of No. 9 Advanced Ammunition sub depot developed in 1942 and manned by 16 Ordnance Ammunition Section. It was closed in 1945.
