= Shire of Bruce Rock =

Local government area in Western Australia

Coordinates: 31°52′52″S 118°08′53″E

- Local government area
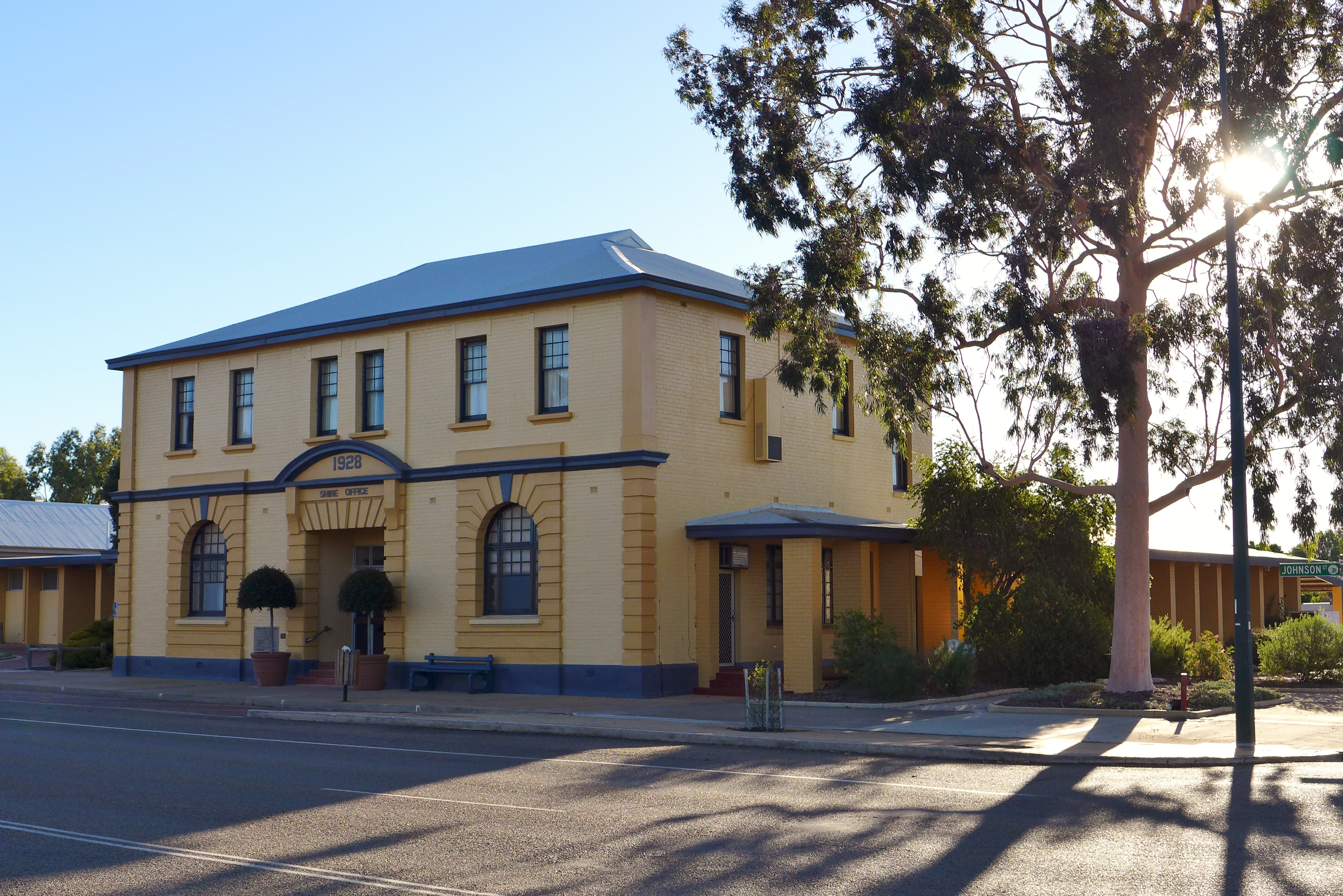
- The state heritage listed Bruce Rock shire offices, 2014

- Interactive map of Shire of Bruce Rock
- Country: Australia
- State: Western Australia
- Region: Wheatbelt
- Established: 1913
- Council seat: Bruce Rock

Government
  - Shire President: Stephen Strange
  - State electorate: Central Wheatbelt
  - Federal division: Durack

Area
  - Total: 2,726.9 km^{2} (1,052.9 sq mi)

Population
  - Total: 979 (LGA 2021)
- Website: Shire of Bruce Rock
LGAs around Shire of Bruce Rock
Kellerberrin	Merredin	Merredin
Quairading	Shire of Bruce Rock	Narembeen
Corrigin	Corrigin	Kondinin

The Shire of Bruce Rock is a local government area in the Wheatbelt region of Western Australia, about 50 kilometres (31 mi) south of Merredin and about 250 kilometres (155 mi) east of the state capital, Perth. The Shire covers an area of 2,727 square kilometres (1,053 sq mi), and its seat of government is the town of Bruce Rock.

== History ==
Bruce Rock was initially constituted as the East Avon Road District in 1913. In 1918, it was renamed to Bruce Rock, and on 1 July 1961, it became a shire following the enactment of the Local Government Act 1960. In 1999, the Ardath, Babakin, Kwolyin, Shackleton, Belka and Coordarin wards covering outlying areas of the Shire were replaced by 2-member South, West and East Wards, while the Central and Town wards covered other areas. Wards were abolished for the 2005 elections.

== Wards ==
The Shire is no longer divided into wards and the eleven councillors represent the entire Shire.

== Towns and localities ==
The towns and localities of the Shire of Bruce Rock with population and size figures based on the most recent Australian census:

Locality	Population	Area	Map
Ardath	51 (SAL 2021)	358.2 km^{2} (138.3 sq mi)	
Babakin	56 (SAL 2021)	381.5 km^{2} (147.3 sq mi)	
Bruce Rock	742 (SAL 2021)	1,108.2 km^{2} (427.9 sq mi)	
Kwolyin	20 (SAL 2021)	343.1 km^{2} (132.5 sq mi)	
Shackleton	114 (SAL 2021)	533.8 km^{2} (206.1 sq mi)	

== Former towns ==
- Belka
- Erikin

== Population ==
Historical population

Year	Pop.	±% p.a.
1921	2,431	—
1933	2,498	+0.23%
1947	1,897	−1.95%
1954	2,384	+3.32%
1961	2,291	−0.57%
1966	2,142	−1.34%
1971	1,694	−4.58%
1976	1,470	−2.80%
1981	1,410	−0.83%

Year	Pop.	±% p.a.
1986	1,298	−1.64%
1991	1,164	−2.16%
1996	1,126	−0.66%
2001	1,051	−1.37%
2006	950	−2.00%
2011	974	+0.50%
2016	930	−0.92%
2021	979	+1.03%

== Heritage-listed places ==
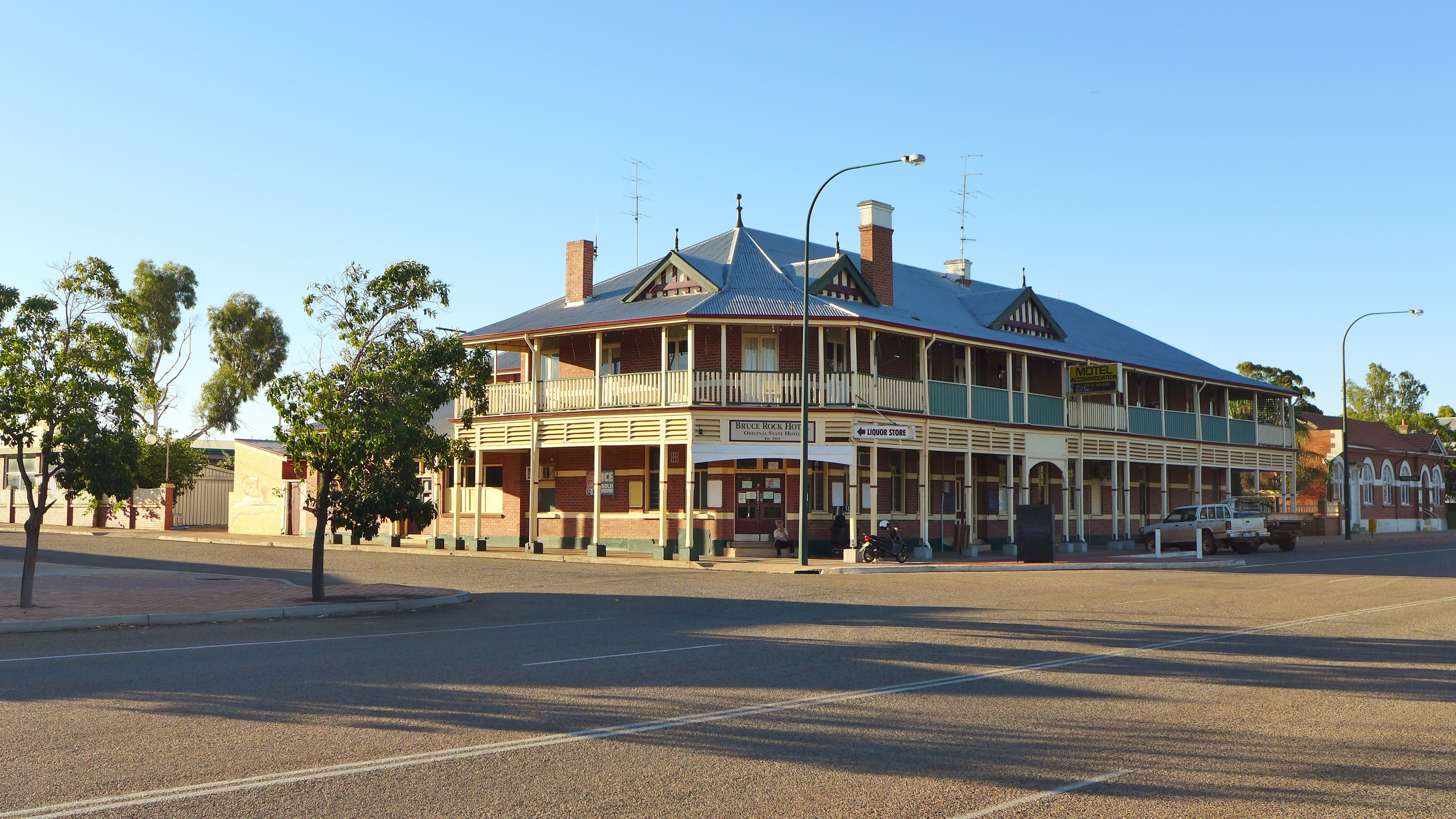
The state heritage listed Bruce Rock Hotel

As of 2023, 210 places are heritage-listed in the Shire of Bruce Rock, of which four are on the State Register of Heritage Places.
