= York to Bruce Rock railway line =

Former railway line in Western Australia

York-Bruce Rock
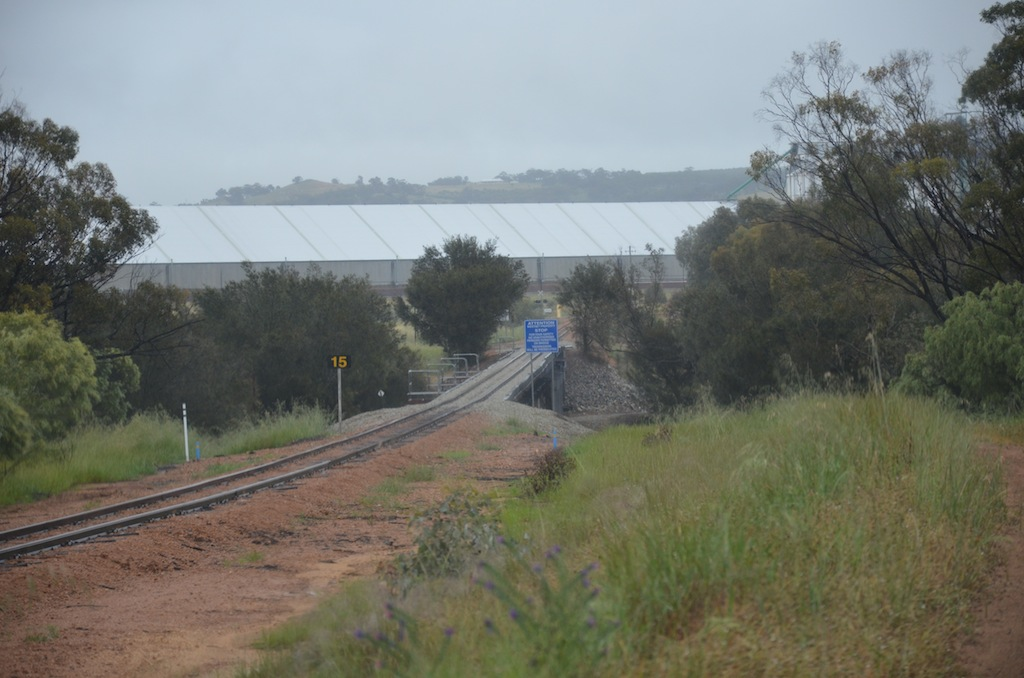
- Bridge over the Avon River at York

Overview
- Owner: Public Transport Authority
- Termini: York; Bruce Rock

Service
- Operator(s): Brookfield Rail

History
- Opened: 1 September 1898 (York-Greenhills); 24 April 1908 (Greenhills-Quairading); 28 March 1913 (Quairading-Bruce Rock)

Technical
- Track length: 152
- Track gauge: 1,067 mm (3 ft 6 in)
- York–Bruce Rock railway line Main locations

The York–Bruce Rock railway line is a closed railway line in the Wheatbelt region of Western Australia running from York to Bruce Rock.

== History ==
On 29 June 1885, the Eastern Railway opened from Chidlow's Well to York. Another line opened south to Beverley on 5 August 1886 and ultimately Albany via the Great Southern Railway.

The York–Greenhills Railway Act 1896, an act by the Parliament of Western Australia granted assent on 27 October 1896, authorised the construction of the railway line from York to Greenhills. The Greenhills–Quairading Railway Act 1906, assented to on 14 December 1906, authorised the construction of the Greenhills to Quairading section of the railway line. The Quairading–Nunajin Railway Act 1911, assented to on 16 February 1911, authorised construction of a railway line from Quairading to Nunajin, later renamed Bruce Rock.

On 9 September 1897, construction commenced on a line to Greenhills, with the line opening on 1 September 1898. On 24 April 1908, it was extended to Quairading, and to Bruce Rock on 4 July 1913. In Bruce Rock, it intersected the Merredin to Narrogin railway line.

The line was initially served by a thrice weekly mixed train; this was later reduced to twice weekly. Once the line from Bruce Rock to Merredin was opened in December 1913, a through service was introduced. In 1938, a thrice weekly through service from Perth to Merredin was introduced with ADE railcars. This reduced the travel time from 17 hours to eight.

In August 1949, a road bus service was introduced. By January 1951, the railcar service had been reduced to once weekly and was withdrawn entirely in March 1952. Diesel locomotives were introduced to the line in 1955, working in parallel with steam locomotives until 1970.

In 1985, the line was closed between Yoting and Shackleton, the line now operating as two separate lines from York to Yoting and Bruce Rock to Shackleton. In October 1990, the haulage of superphosphate ceased, with the line exclusively used by grain trains. It was cut back to Quairading in the 1990s and closed entirely in October 2013.

In 2013, the section of the railway line from York to Quairading was closed, with a lack of government investment in the line stated as the cause by the operator. In 2021, it was estimated that it would cost A$110.9 million to upgrade the York to Quairading section of the railway line to reopen it.

Arc Infrastructure deems the railway line to be part of its Grain Freight Rail Network, which, in 2017, accounted for 50 percent of its network but only 10 percent of its freight. The line from York to Quairading was classified as Tier 3.
