= Narembeen, Western Australia =

Town in the Wheatbelt, Western Australia

Narembeen
- Town
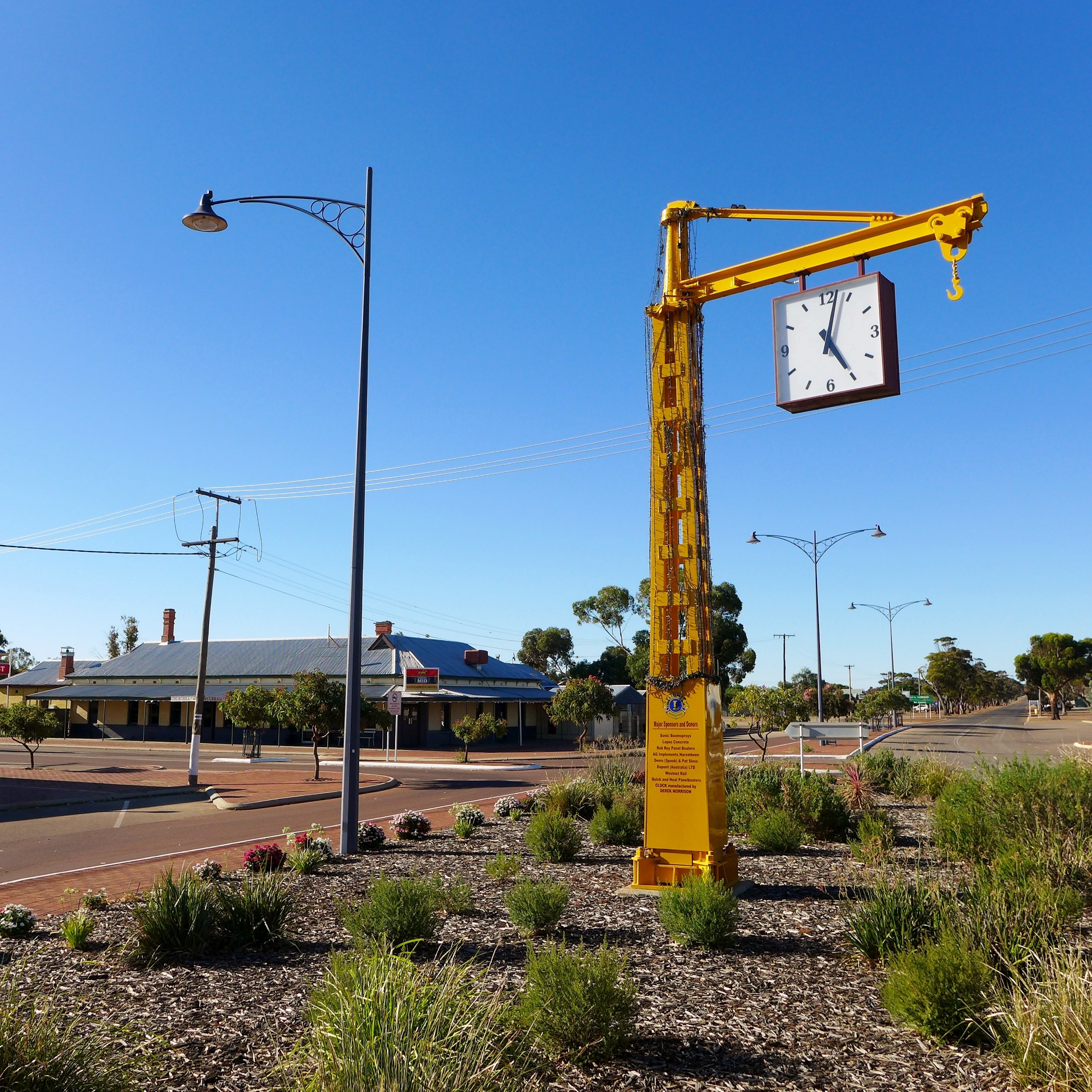
- Narembeen town clock, 2014

- Interactive map of Narembeen
- Coordinates: 32°3′48″S 118°23′46″E
- Country: Australia
- State: Western Australia
- LGA: Shire of Narembeen
- Location: 286 km (178 mi) east of Perth; 31 km (19 mi) south east of Bruce Rock; 66 km (41 mi) south of Merredin
- Established: 1922

Government
  - State electorate: Central Wheatbelt
  - Federal division: Durack

Area
  - Total: 1 km^{2} (0.39 sq mi)
- Elevation: 280 m (920 ft)

Population
  - Total: 423 (SAL 2021)
- Postcode: 6369

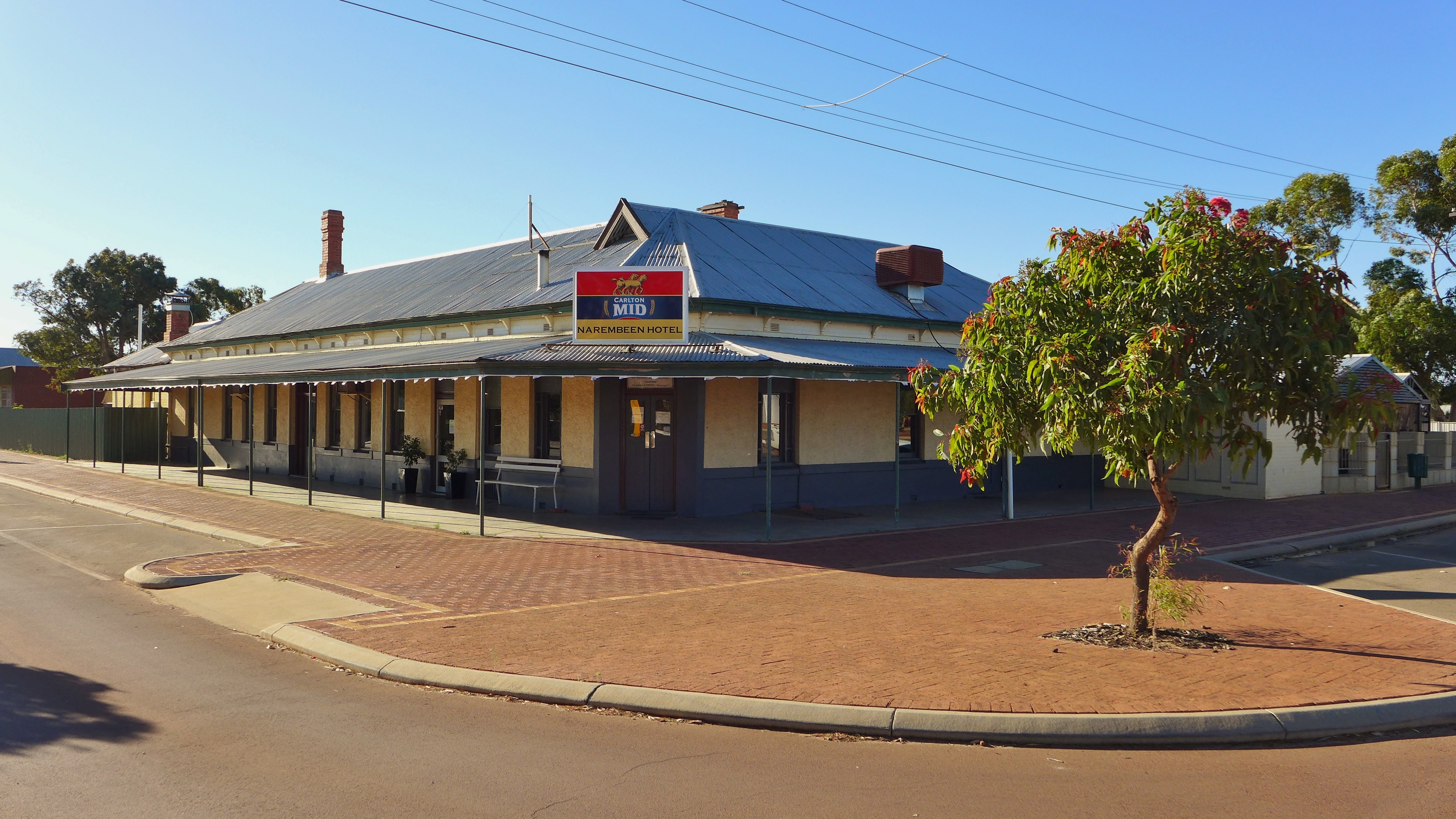
Narembeen Hotel, 2014

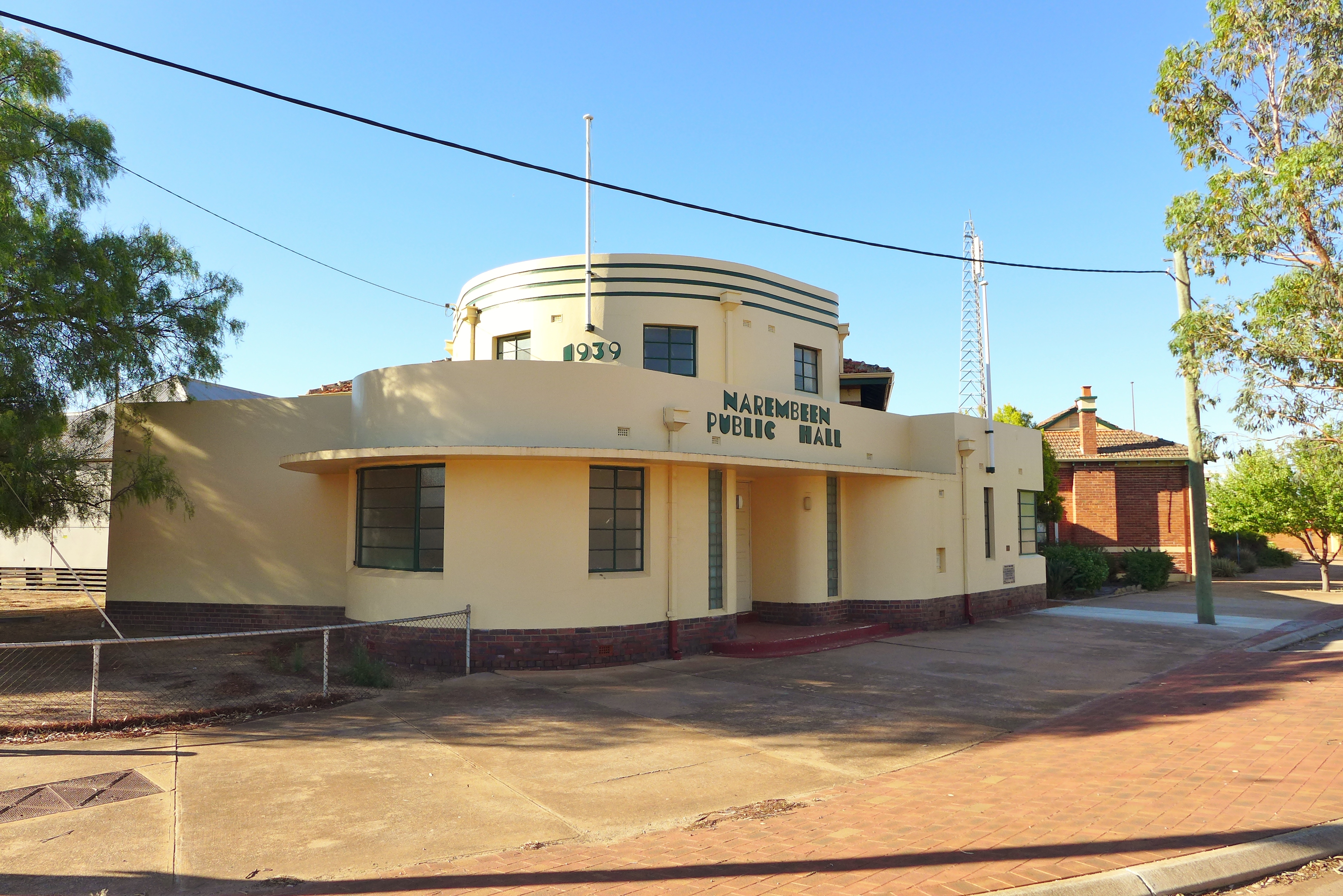
Narembeen Public Hall, 2014

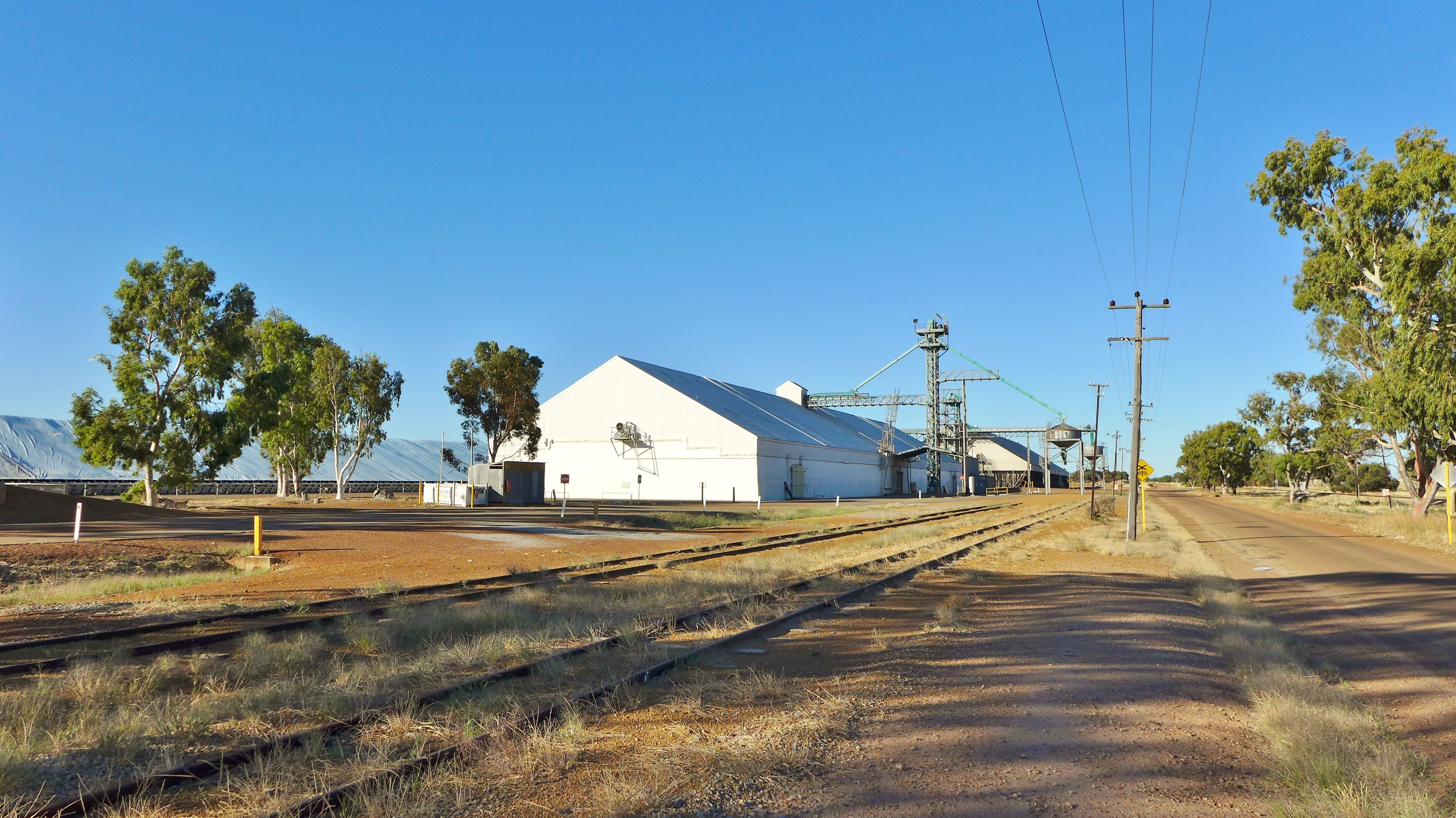
Narembeen grain receival point, 2014

Narembeen is a town in the Wheatbelt region of Western Australia. It is 286 km, almost due east, from Perth, the capital of WA. It is the major settlement in the Shire of Narembeen, in which the major industries are growing cereal crops and raising cattle and sheep. The surrounding areas produce wheat and other cereal crops. The town is a receival site for Cooperative Bulk Handling.

Narembeen means place of female emus in the local Aboriginal language.

== History ==
The area was initially surveyed in 1836 by the Surveyor General John Septimus Roe. After camping on a rocky outcrop and seeing a group of emus he named the area Emu Hill. By the 1850s, European settlers arrived in the area looking for pastoral land for wheat and grazing. Sandalwood cutters also frequented the area during this time.

In 1901 the rabbit proof fence was constructed just to the east of Narembeen, and can still be seen today.

A settler named Charles Smith bought a property he called Narimbeen. By the 1900s more farmers moved to the area as land was opened up, and by 1918 the town-site of Emu Hill was gazetted.

In 1920, the town-site of Narembeen only existed as a minor siding to the railway line that had only just been built to Emu Hill.

By the 1920s Emu Hill was the largest community in the region but the local populace opposed the building of a hotel in the town.

As a result of this a Perth lawyer, Henry Dale and a publican, Paddy Conlon, purchased 30 acres (120,000 m^{2}) of land at the railway siding of Narembeen to build a hotel. The town of Narembeen was established in 1922 about 5 km from the Emu Hill town-site. The location of Narembeen was not the best choice as it is prone to flooding. In 1924, there were rumours that gold had been discovered close to the rabbit proof fence and the town of Holleton was established about 50 km from Narembeen, but Narembeen prospered as it was the closest train station to Holleton and offered a motor transport service to the miners.

Narembeen had a population of 2,100 by 1925 and Emu Hill was no more.

In 1932 the Wheat Pool of Western Australia announced that the town would have two grain elevators, each fitted with an engine, installed at the railway siding.

In 1968 the town of Narembeen was officially declared.

== Climate ==
Climate data for Narembeen (1965–2022)
Month	Jan	Feb	Mar	Apr	May	Jun	Jul	Aug	Sep	Oct	Nov	Dec	Year
Record high °C (°F)	45.8 (114.4)	47.1 (116.8)	41.7 (107.1)	37.6 (99.7)	33.6 (92.5)	27.2 (81.0)	24.7 (76.5)	30.7 (87.3)	34.0 (93.2)	38.3 (100.9)	43.1 (109.6)	44.4 (111.9)	47.1 (116.8)
Mean daily maximum °C (°F)	34.1 (93.4)	33.2 (91.8)	30.3 (86.5)	25.8 (78.4)	21.0 (69.8)	17.6 (63.7)	16.6 (61.9)	17.7 (63.9)	20.7 (69.3)	25.1 (77.2)	28.7 (83.7)	32.2 (90.0)	25.2 (77.4)
Mean daily minimum °C (°F)	16.6 (61.9)	16.9 (62.4)	15.0 (59.0)	12.1 (53.8)	8.2 (46.8)	6.4 (43.5)	5.5 (41.9)	5.4 (41.7)	6.2 (43.2)	9.1 (48.4)	12.4 (54.3)	14.6 (58.3)	10.7 (51.3)
Record low °C (°F)	8.5 (47.3)	7.6 (45.7)	5.6 (42.1)	2.8 (37.0)	−1.8 (28.8)	−2.2 (28.0)	−3.2 (26.2)	−1.8 (28.8)	−1.5 (29.3)	0.7 (33.3)	1.4 (34.5)	4.4 (39.9)	−3.2 (26.2)
Average precipitation mm (inches)	17.0 (0.67)	18.6 (0.73)	21.5 (0.85)	22.9 (0.90)	38.6 (1.52)	50.4 (1.98)	48.9 (1.93)	43.0 (1.69)	25.7 (1.01)	19.3 (0.76)	16.7 (0.66)	12.9 (0.51)	335.7 (13.22)
Average precipitation days	2.2	2.6	3.5	5.1	7.6	10.6	11.7	10.6	7.4	5.2	3.7	2.5	72.7
