= Yoting, Western Australia =

Yoting
- Town
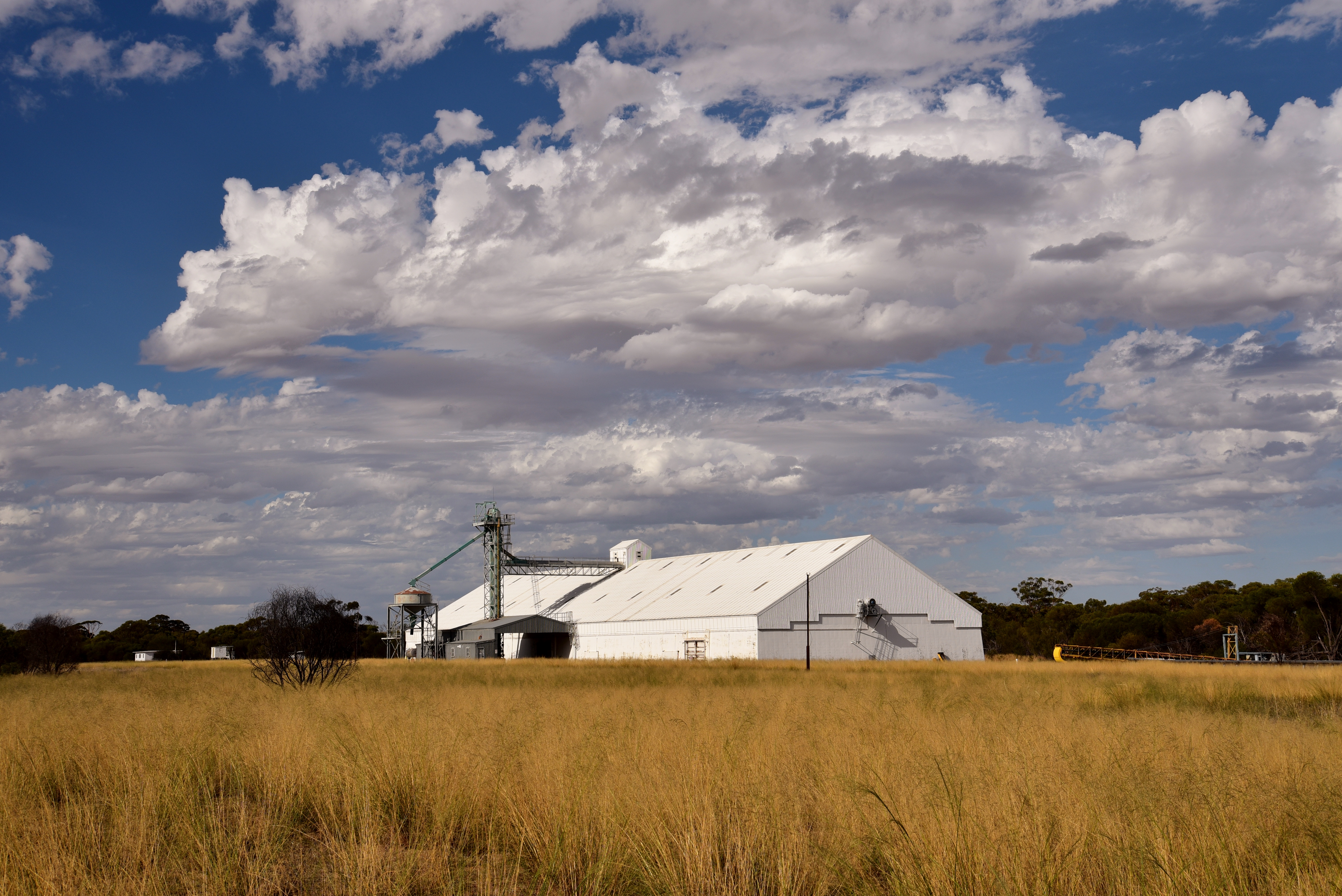
- Yoting grain receival point, 2018

- Coordinates: 31°58′S 117°36′E
- Country: Australia
- State: Western Australia
- LGA: Shire of Quairading
- Location: 183 km (114 mi) east of Perth; 19 km (12 mi) east of Quairading
- Established: 1914

Government
  - State electorate: Central Wheatbelt
  - Federal division: O’Connor

Area
  - Total: 115.5 km^{2} (44.6 sq mi)
- Elevation: 274 m (899 ft)

Population
  - Total: 17 (SAL 2021)
- Postcode: 6383

Yoting is a small town located between Quairading and Bruce Rock in the Wheatbelt region of Western Australia.

It was originally a station on the Quairading to Bruce Rock railway line when it was established in 1912. Lots were surveyed in early 1914 and the townsite was gazetted later the same year.

The name is Aboriginal in origin and was taken from the nearby Yoting well. The well or spring first appeared on maps in 1873. Bruce Leake, an early settler, noted that the words Yot means two women fighting with wannas or digging sticks.

The surrounding areas produce wheat and other cereal crops. The town is a grain receival site for Cooperative Bulk Handling.
