= Piesseville, Western Australia =

Piesseville
- Town
- Interactive map of Piesseville
- Coordinates: 33°11′38″S 117°17′17″E
- Country: Australia
- State: Western Australia
- LGA: Shire of Wagin
- Location: 211 km (131 mi) from Perth; 17 km (11 mi) from Wagin
- Established: 1903

Government
  - State electorate: Roe
  - Federal division: O'Connor

Area
  - Total: 249.9 km^{2} (96.5 sq mi)
- Elevation: 303 m (994 ft)

Population
  - Total: 49 (SAL 2021)
- Postcode: 6315
- Mean max temp: 22.8 °C (73.0 °F)
- Mean min temp: 9.7 °C (49.5 °F)
- Annual rainfall: 436.1 mm (17.17 in)

Piesseville is a small town in the Wheatbelt region of Western Australia, 211 kilometres (131 mi) south-east of Perth on the Great Southern Highway between Narrogin and Wagin. It is also on the Great Southern Railway. At the 2016 census, Piesseville had a population of 59.

== History ==
In the 1860s, early settlers came to the area to graze their flocks, but the first official records of it began in 1889 when the Great Southern Railway opened, and a siding called Buchanan River was opened. In 1897, the Government set aside land for subdivision here, and in 1903 lots were surveyed and the town of Buchanan gazetted. The land agent at Katanning reported considerable interest, and a hall, school and other facilities had been completed by 1904.

However, the name clashed with a town in New South Wales (now little more than a historic gallery outside Kurri Kurri in the Hunter Valley), so the town was renamed Barton in 1905 to honour Australia's first prime minister (1901–1903), Sir Edmund Barton. The Barton Hotel, a general store, and a progress association were in operation in early 1906. The Barton Agricultural Hall was opened on 10 October 1906 at a cost of $360. It was used for church services, agricultural meetings, and as a school. The town had its own rifle range and an area was set aside as a cemetery, although no one was ever buried there.

After the construction of the Trans-Australian Railway in 1917, the Federal Government decided that the sidings along the railway linking Western Australia to the eastern states should be named after Australian prime ministers. The name Barton was given to a station in the South Australian stretch of the Nullarbor Plain.

Residents were not given an opportunity to choose a new name and in December 1918 the town was renamed Piesse, after two prominent residents from the district Frederick Henry Piesse and Charles Austin Piesse. In 1923, Arnold Edmund Piesse complained that the town was being confused with his farm and asked for it to be changed to Piesseville. In December 1923, the town was changed to its present name – its fourth in 20 years.

For many years after the name change, the Hall committee of management continued to head its correspondence with the words "Barton Agricultural Hall, Piesseville".

In late 1949, the Piesseville school closed down due to an insufficient number of children. The students from the town were brought into Wagin by bus.

Piesseville today is more of an agricultural locality, although the original 1904 hall still stands.
