= Bruce Rock =

Town in the Wheatbelt region of Western Australia

- Town
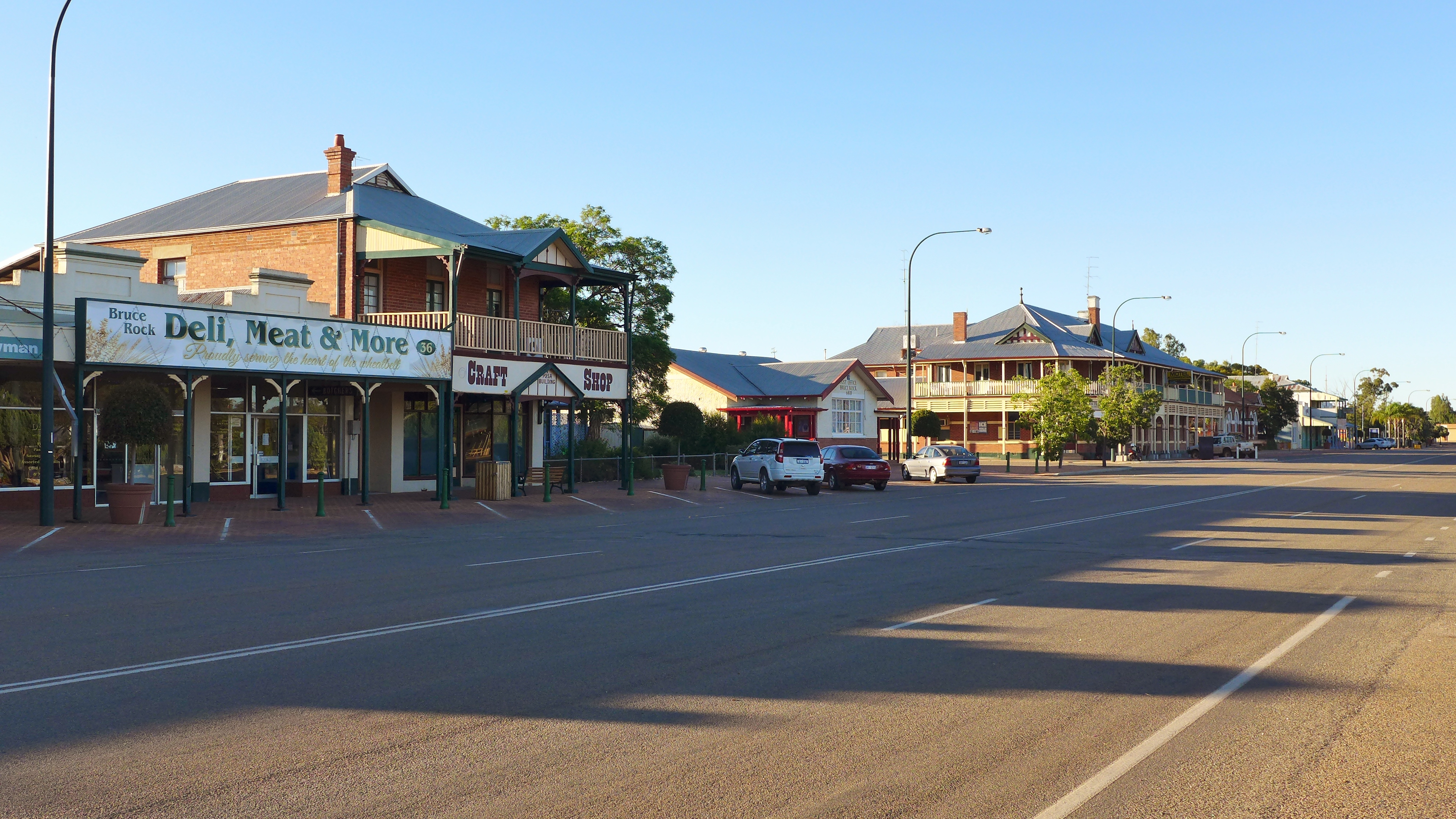
- Johnson Street, Bruce Rock, 2014

- Interactive map of Bruce Rock
- Coordinates: 31.881°S 118.148°E
- Country: Australia
- State: Western Australia
- LGA: Shire of Bruce Rock
- Location: 243 km (151 mi) E of Perth; 49 km (30 mi) SW of Merredin
- Established: 1913

Government
  - State electorate: Central Wheatbelt
  - Federal division: O'Connor

Area
  - Total: 1,108.2 km^{2} (427.9 sq mi)
- Elevation: 276 m (906 ft)

Population
  - Total: 564 (UCL 2021)
- Postcode: 6418
- Mean max temp: 25.0 °C (77.0 °F)
- Mean min temp: 10.5 °C (50.9 °F)
- Annual rainfall: 329.5 mm (12.97 in)

Bruce Rock is a town in the eastern Wheatbelt region of Western Australia, approximately 243 kilometres (151 mi) east of Perth and 48 kilometres (30 mi) southwest of Merredin. It is the main town in the Shire of Bruce Rock.

== History ==
Originally known as Nunagin or Noonegin, the name of the town led to confusion between other towns such as Narrogin and Nungarin. The name was changed to Bruce Rock after the large granite feature located close to the town. The townsite was gazetted in 1913. The rock is thought to be named after sandalwood cutter John Rufus Bruce, who worked in the area in 1879.

The heritage listed shire office building was opened in January 1929.

The painter John Perceval was born in Bruce Rock in 1923.

In 1932 the Wheat Pool of Western Australia announced that the town would have two grain elevators, each fitted with an engine, installed at the railway siding on the Merredin to Narrogin railway line.

The town won the tidy town award for the wheatbelt in 2003 following a push to rejuvenate older buildings, installing landscaping and the completion of an amphitheatre. A waste transfer station was also upgraded.

== Economy ==
Economically the area depends on cropping of cereals, primarily wheat, but also barley, lupins and peas. Livestock such as sheep, goats and pigs are also raised in the area. The town is a receival site for Cooperative Bulk Handling.

== See also ==
- Wheatbelt railway lines of Western Australia
