= Rothsay, Western Australia =

Ghost town in Western Australia

Rothsay
- Town
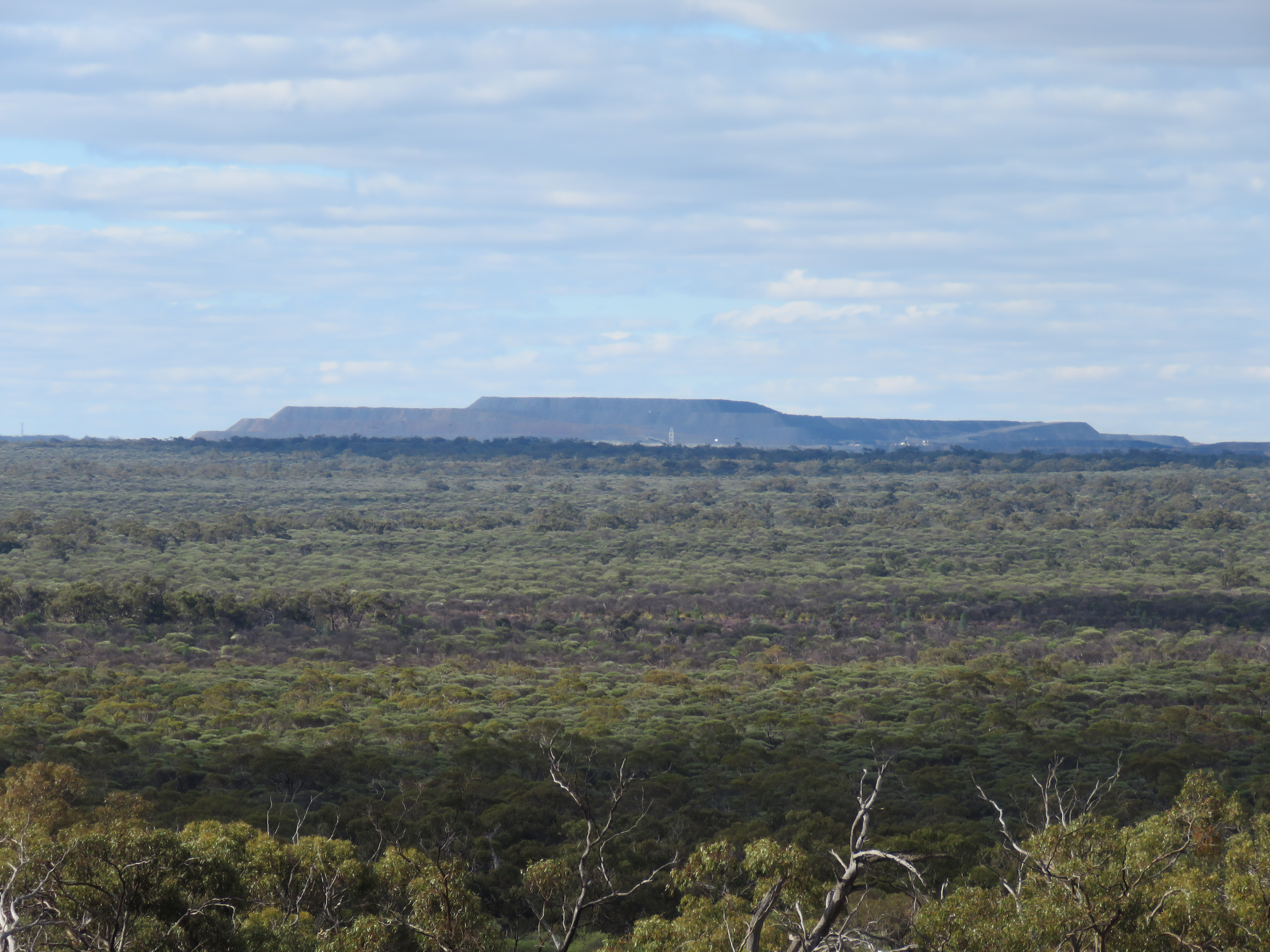
- Karara mine seen from John Forrest lookout in Rothsay

- Interactive map of Rothsay
- Coordinates: 29.283°S 116.883°E
- Country: Australia
- State: Western Australia
- LGA: Shire of Perenjori
- Location: 427 km (265 mi) NNE of Perth; 70 km (43 mi) ENE of Perenjori
- Established: 1898

Government
  - State electorate: Moore
  - Federal division: Durack

Area
  - Total: 3,490.1 km^{2} (1,347.5 sq mi)
- Elevation: 353 m (1,158 ft)

Population
  - Total: 197 (SAL 2021)
- Postcode: 6620

Rothsay is an abandoned town in the Mid West region of Western Australia. It is situated between the towns of Dalwallinu and Mount Magnet

A prospector named George Woodley discovered gold in the area in 1894 and initially the area was known as Woodley's Find.Within a year all of the leases had been pegged and in 1895 Woodley sold his claim to a Scottish mining company. The local progress association requested that a townsite be declared in 1897 and it was gazetted in 1898. Later the same year the population of the town was 140, 110 males and 30 females.

In its heyday the town had a population of over 500 people. Later the town fell into decline but experienced a second lease of life when the entrepreneur Claude de Bernales reopened the mine in 1932. Today the town is abandoned but remnants of the strong room, the mine manager's house and the derelict shaft are all that remain.

The town is thought to have been named after the Scottish town of Rothesay on the Isle of Bute, on the coast of the Firth of Clyde. Both spellings were in currency in the town's early years, with Rothesay apparently used in the first instance.

== See also ==
- Karara mine
