= List of heritage places in the Shire of Carnamah =

List of heritage sites in Western Australia

The State Register of Heritage Places is maintained by the Heritage Council of Western Australia. As of 2026, 71 places are heritage-listed in the Shire of Carnamah, of which one is on the State Register of Heritage Places, the Macpherson Homestead. The homestead, which was State Heritage-listed in April 1995, dates back to 1870.

== List ==
=== State Register of Heritage Places ===
The Western Australian State Register of Heritage Places, as of 2026, lists the following state registered place within the Shire of Carnamah:

Place name	Place #	Street name	Suburb or town	Co-ordinates	Built	State registered	Notes & former names	Photo
Macpherson Homestead	447	Carnamah-Bunjil Road	Carnamah	29.684298°S 115.901997°E	1870	7 April 1995	An example of a rural, vernacular Western Australian homestead of the 1870s	

=== Shire of Carnamah heritage-listed places ===
The following places are heritage listed in the Shire of Carnamah but are not State registered:

Place name	Place #	Street #	Street name	Suburb or town	Notes & former names	Photo
St Andrew's Church (R.C.)	448	Corner	Caron Street & Bowman Road	Carnamah		
Carnamah Post Office & Quarters (former)	449		Macpherson Street	Carnamah	Shop	
Carnamah Post Office & shop	450		Macpherson Street	Carnamah	Bush Basket	
Presbyterian Church (former)	451		Macpherson Street	Carnamah	Uniting Church, Methodist Church	
Pyramid Tea Rooms (former)	452	Corner	Macpherson & Caron Streets	Carnamah	T.A.B.	
Bankwest Building	453	Corner	Macpherson & Caron Streets	Carnamah	Bank of Australasia, R & I Bank	
Police House (former)	454	16	Railway Avenue	Carnamah	Police Station, Residence	
Carnamah Shire Office, Chambers & Library	6130		MacPherson Street	Carnamah		
Carnamah Shire Hall	6131	Corner	MacPherson & Caron Streets	Carnamah	Carnamah Shire Offices (former)	
Carnamah District High School	6132	Corner	MacPherson & King Streets	Carnamah		
RSL Memorial Hall	6133		MacPherson Street	Carnamah	Carnamah Pre-Primary Centre	
Carnamah Police Station (former)	6134	Corner	MacPherson & King Streets	Carnamah		
Butcher & Hairdresser Shop	6135		MacPherson Street	Carnamah		
Berrigan's	6136	Corner	MacPherson & Niven Streets	Carnamah		
Shop	6137		MacPherson Street	Carnamah	Carnamah Boutique (former), Butcher Shop (former), Post Office	
Bakery (former)	6138		MacPherson Street	Carnamah	Chegs & Co Accountants Shop	
Red Cross Thrift Shop	6139		MacPherson Street	Carnamah	S.P. Bookmaker (former)	
CWA Building	6140		MacPherson Street	Carnamah	Carnamah Child Care Centre	
Carnamah Hotel	6141	Corner	MacPherson & Robertson Streets	Carnamah		
Museum	6142	Corner	MacPherson & Caron Streets	Carnamah	TAB (former) and Tearooms	
Wallaces News and Drapery	6143	Corner	MacPherson & Yarra Streets	Carnamah		
Carnamah War Memorial	6144	Corner	MacPherson & Yarra Streets	Carnamah		
Carnamah Railway Station, Station Master's House & Siding - Site	6145		Yarra Street	Carnamah		
Anglican Church of Holy Apostles	6146	Corner	Niven Crescent & Lang Street	Carnamah		
Parkers House	6147		MacPherson Street	Carnamah		
Headmaster's House (former)	6148		Railway Avenue	Carnamah		
Orlicz's House	6149		Yarra Street	Carnamah		
Shell Manager's House (former)	6150		Yarra Street	Carnamah		
Dallimore's House	6151		Robertson Street	Carnamah		
Doctor's House (former)	6152		Robertson Street	Carnamah		
Carnamah Bowling Club	6153		Niven Crescent	Carnamah		
Carnamah Recreation Centre and Showgrounds	6154		Niven Crescent	Carnamah	Niven Park Sporting Complex	
Wheat Silos	6155		Midlands Road	Carnamah		
Wheat Silos (Original) - Site of	6156		Yarra Street	Carnamah		
Carnamah School (former) - Site	6157			Carnamah		
Billeroo Spring and Well	6159	Near junction of	Rds 13 & 6	Carnamah		
Cooragabbie Well	6160		On the Old Telegraph Road	Carnamah	Gouragabba Well	
Pinch Gut Well	6161		Carnamah Perenjori/Reading/Mitchell Road	Carnamah		
Winchester Townsite	6162	Junction	Winchester East Road No 5 & Midlands Road	Winchester		
Winchester School (former) - Site	6163		Winchester East Road	Winchester		
Winchester Cemetery	6164	East of		Winchester		
Inering School (former) - site	6165	North-East of	Carnamah-Perenjori Road	Carnamah		
Wongyarra School (former) - Site	6166	East of	Caron-Bodycoat Road 13.5 m	Carnamah		
Billeroo School (former) - Site	6167		West junction of Roads 13 & 6	Carnamah		
Log Causeway	6168		Yarra Yarra Lakes	Carnamah		
Grenaige	6169		Midlands Road, North of Carnamah	Carnamah		
Old Geraldton Road - Site	6170		Old Geraldton Road	Carnamah		
Perenjori-Carnamah Road	6171		Perenjori-Carnamah Road	Carnamah		
Yarra Well Cottage - Site	6172	South-West of	Carnamah-Eneabba Road	Carnamah		
Blue Metal Quarry (former)	6173	East of		Carnamah	Rubbish tip	
Original Eneabba Store	6174	Corner	King & Gooch Streets	Eneabba	McDonald's Store	
Eneabba Primary School	6175		Clark Place	Eneabba		
School Teacher's House	6176		Dewar Street	Eneabba		
Eneabba Horseman's Hall	6177			Eneabba	Eneabba Recreation Hall	
Eneabba Club Rooms	6178		Eneabba Dve	Eneabba		
Original Eneabba Springs - site	6179			Eneabba	Homestead, Horse Yards & House	
Original Eneabba School (former)	6180			Eneabba	Shearing Shed	
Lake Indoon	6181	South of	Eneabba-Coolimba Road	Eneabba		
King's Homestead	6182		Eneabba-Coolimba & Gould Simpson Roads	Eneabba		
WSLC - War Service Depot	6183		Eneabba-Three Springs & Second North Roads	Eneabba		
Squatter Shack 103	6955		Dunes - high	Coolimba		
Manse	15034	26	Caron Street	Carnamah		
Eneabba Police Station	17433		Eneabba Drive	Eneabba		
Carnamah Police Station	17434		Cnr King & McPherson Street	Carnamah		
Lake Erindoon	18108		Coolimba-Eneabba Road	Warradarge		
Lake Logue	18109			Eneabba		
Arro Well	18110		Reserve 971, track south of Beekeepers Road	Eneabba	Woodack Well, Woodada Well	
Alexander Morrison National Park	18591		Corrow Green Head Road	Eneabba		
Tathra National Park	18736		Carnamah Eneabba Road	Eneabba		
Woodada	26948			Eneabba		

== See also ==
- Carnamah Historical Society
