= Maya, Western Australia =

Maya
- Town
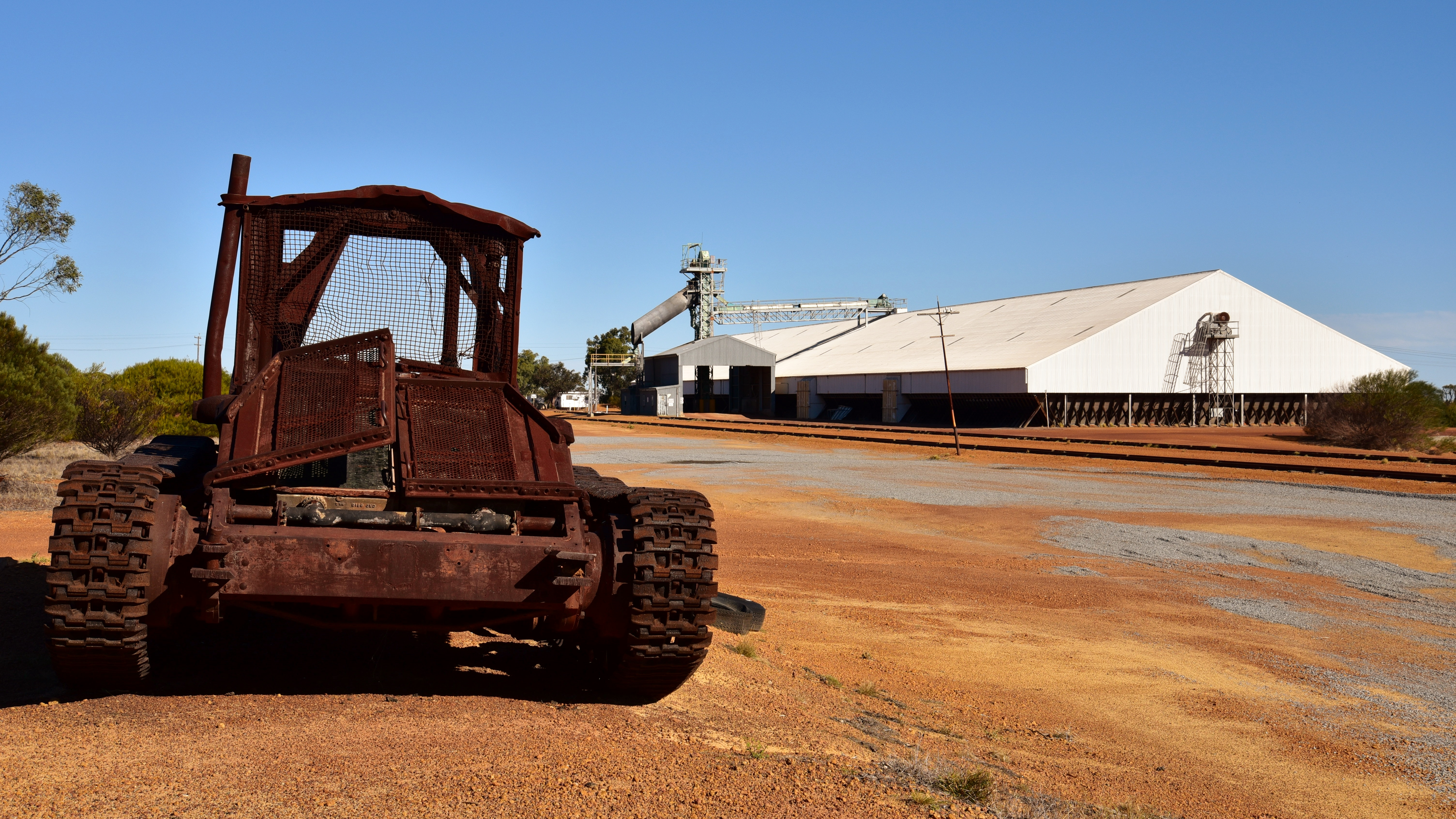
- Maya in 2018

- Coordinates: 29°52′57″S 116°30′09″E
- Country: Australia
- State: Western Australia
- LGA(s): Shire of Perenjori
- Location: 301 km (187 mi) NE of Perth; 47 km (29 mi) NNW of Dalwallinu; 88 km (55 mi) SE of Morawa
- Established: 1913

Government
  - State electorate(s): Moore
  - Federal division(s): Durack

Area
  - Total: 570.5 km^{2} (220.3 sq mi)
- Elevation: 343 m (1,125 ft)

Population
  - Total(s): 20 (SAL 2021)
- Postcode: 6614

Maya is a small town in the Mid West region of Western Australia.

The town's name is a result of the shortening of the Indigenous Australian word for a nearby spring, Pocanmaya. The name was first recorded by surveyors in 1876.

The town originated as a railway siding on the Mullewa to Wongan Hills railway line that was planned in 1913. The townsite was gazetted in 1913 and the railway commenced operation in 1915.

In 1932 the Wheat Pool of Western Australia announced that the town would have two grain elevators, each fitted with an engine, installed at the railway siding.

The surrounding areas produce wheat and other cereal crops. The town is a receival site for Cooperative Bulk Handling.
