= Port Denison, Western Australia =

Port Denison
- Town
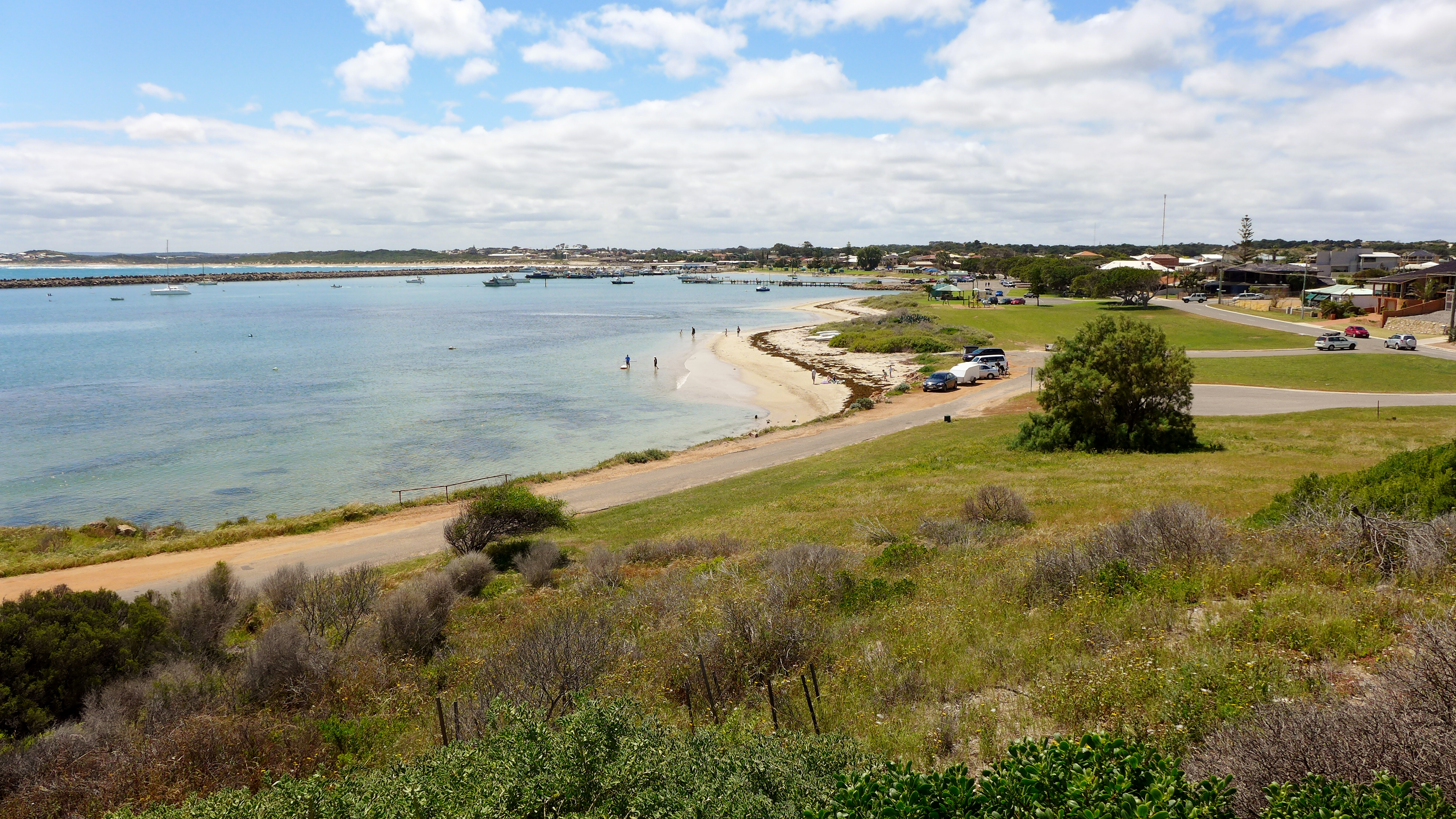
- Port Denison and its Boat Harbour, 2014

- Interactive map of Port Denison
- Coordinates: 29°16′30″S 114°55′10″E
- Country: Australia
- State: Western Australia
- LGA: Shire of Irwin
- Location: 4 km (2.5 mi) SSW of Dongara; 365 km (227 mi) NNW of Perth
- Established: 1867

Government
  - State electorate: Moore
  - Federal division: Durack

Area
  - Total: 15 km^{2} (5.8 sq mi)
- Elevation: 10 m (33 ft)

Population
  - Total: 1,452 (SAL 2021)
- Postcode: 6525

Port Denison is a town in the Mid West region of Western Australia. Its local government area is the Shire of Irwin and it is located 4 kilometres (2.5 mi) southwest of Dongara on the Indian Ocean coast.

== History ==
Port Denison was initially known as Irwin Port in 1866 due to its position near the mouth of the Irwin River. However, when it was officially named and gazetted in 1867, it was renamed in honour of Sir William Denison, a former Governor of Tasmania who in 1851 had visited Western Australia in connection with transportation of convicts.

== Economy ==
Port Denison is the home port of a number of commercial fishermen that catch lobster (known as crayfish locally).
