= Shire of Yalgoo =

Coordinates: 28°20′28″S 116°40′59″E

- Local government area
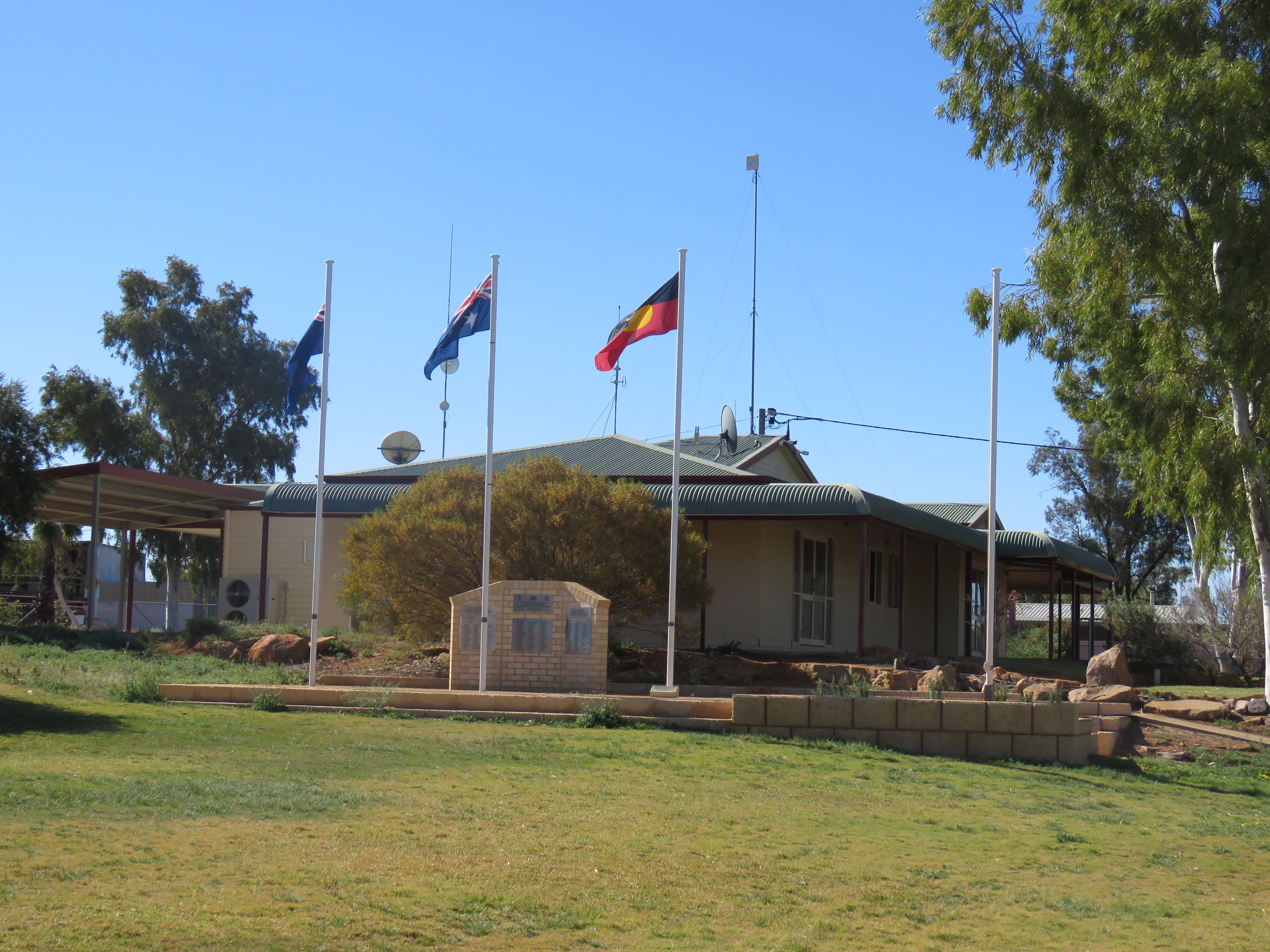
- The Yalgoo shire offices in September 2021

- Interactive map of Shire of Yalgoo
- Country: Australia
- State: Western Australia
- Region: Mid West
- Council seat: Yalgoo

Government
  - Shire President: Gregory Payne
  - State electorate: North West
  - Federal division: Durack

Area
  - Total: 28,214.6 km^{2} (10,893.7 sq mi)

Population
  - Total: 340 (LGA 2021)
- Website: Shire of Yalgoo
LGAs around Shire of Yalgoo
Murchison	Cue	Mount Magnet
Greater Geraldton	Shire of Yalgoo	Sandstone
Perenjori	Dalwallinu	Mount Marshall

The Shire of Yalgoo is a local government area in the Mid West region of Western Australia, about 500 kilometres (311 mi) north of the state capital, Perth. The Shire covers an area of 28,215 square kilometres (10,894 sq mi), and its seat of government is the town of Yalgoo.

== History ==
The original Yalgoo Road District was gazetted on 3 July 1896, and abolished and divided between the Mount Magnet Road District and Upper Irwin Road District on 11 August 1911.

The Shire of Yalgoo originates from the establishment of the second Yalgoo Road District on 19 April 1912, which was formed out of parts of the Mount Magnet, Upper Irwin and Murchison road boards. On 1 July 1961, it became the Shire of Yalgoo under the Local Government Act 1960, which reformed all remaining road districts into shires.

== Wards ==
The Shire is no longer divided into wards and the seven councillors sit at large.

== Towns and localities ==
The towns and localities of the Shire of Yalgoo with population and size figures based on the most recent Australian census:

Locality	Population	Area	Map
Paynes Find	26 (SAL 2021)	10,951 km^{2} (4,228 sq mi)	
Yalgoo	313 (SAL 2021)	16,996.2 km^{2} (6,562.3 sq mi)	

== Pastoral station names associated with Yalgoo ==
Note that some of these stations may lie outside of the local government boundary.

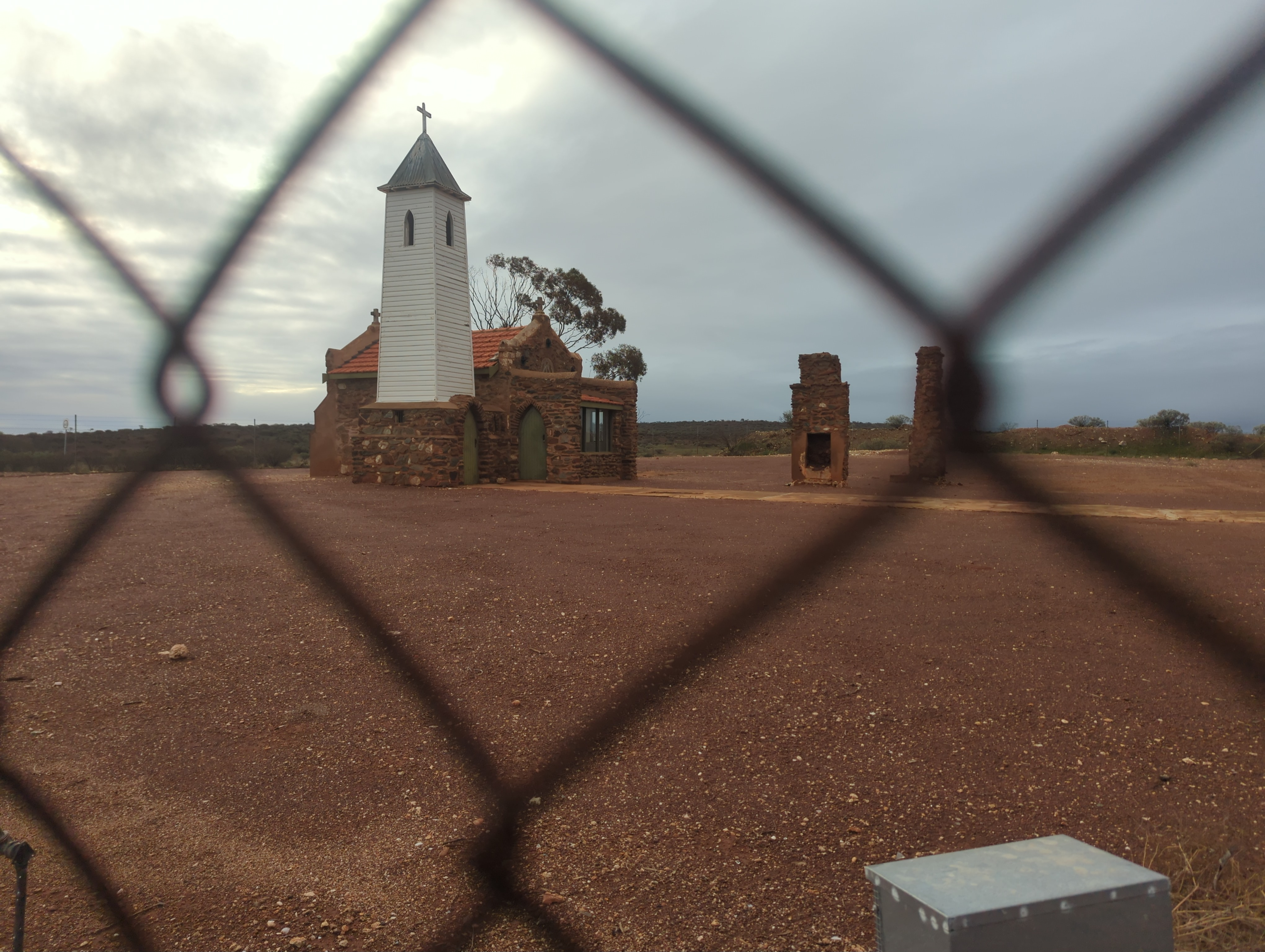
Dominican Convent Chapel of St Hyacinth in Yalgoo

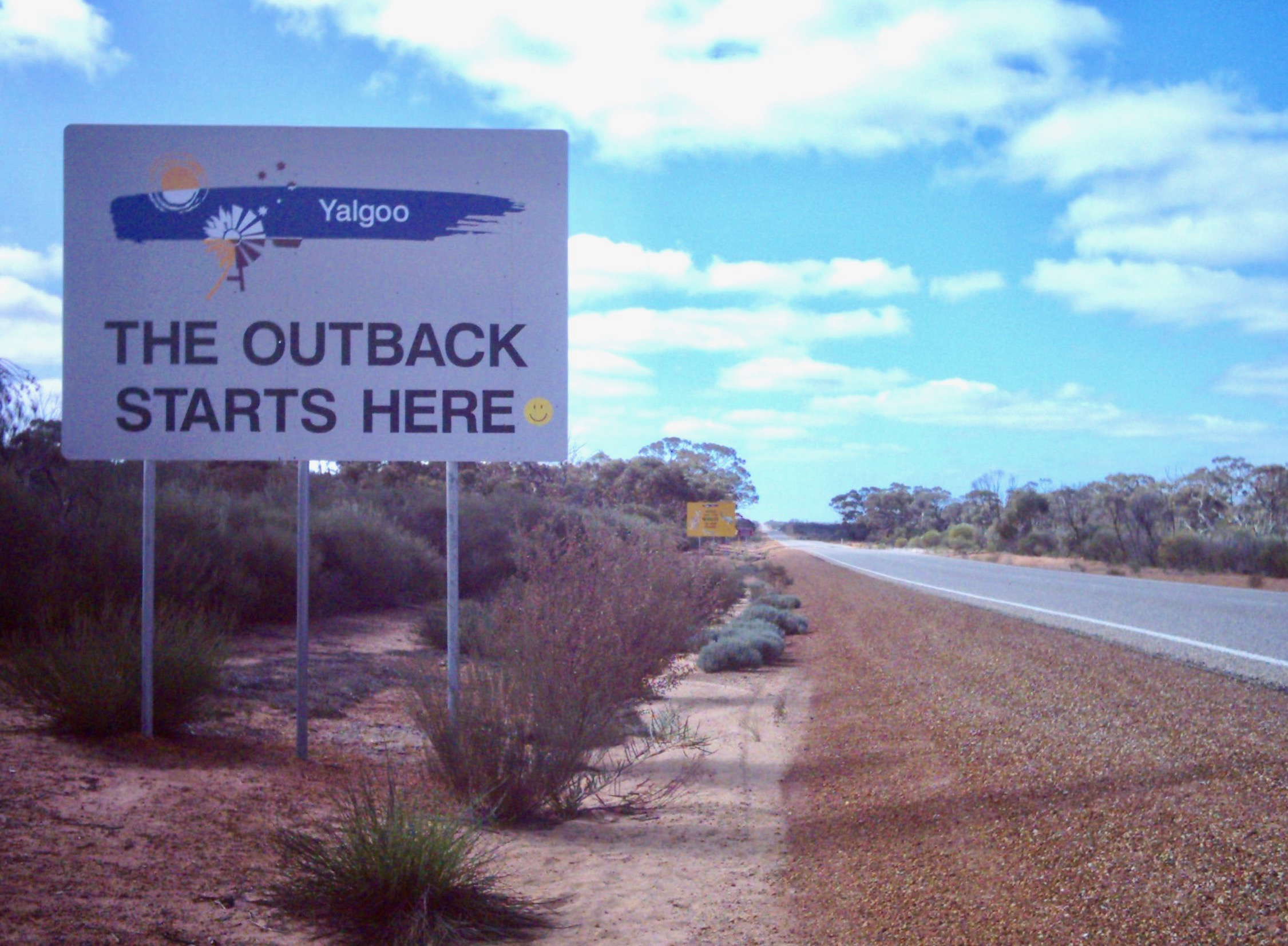
Shire boundary on the Great Northern Highway near Mount Gibson

- Barnong
- Bunnawarra
- Carlaminda
- Dalgaranga
- Edah
- Gabyon
- Jingemarra
- Maranalgo
- Meka
- Melangata
- Mellenbye
- Mount Gibson
- Muralgarra
- Nalbarra
- Ninghan
- Noongal
- Oudabunna
- Thundelarra
- Wagga Wagga
- Wydgee

== Notable councillors ==
- Frank Wallace, Yalgoo Roads Board chairman 1896–1897; later a state MP

== Heritage-listed places ==
As of 2023, 42 places are heritage-listed in the Shire of Yalgoo, of which eleven are on the State Register of Heritage Places.

== See also ==
- Yalgoo bioregion – the ecological region
