= Bunjil, Western Australia =

Bunjil
- Town
- Coordinates: 29.665°S 116.371°E
- Country: Australia
- State: Western Australia
- LGA(s): Shire of Perenjori
- Location: 326 km (203 mi) N of Perth; 62 km (39 mi) SE of Morawa; 74 km (46 mi) N of Dalwallinu
- Established: 1914

Government
  - State electorate(s): Moore
  - Federal division(s): Durack

Area
  - Total: 1,926.2 km^{2} (743.7 sq mi)
- Elevation: 319 m (1,047 ft)

Population
  - Total(s): 61 (SAL 2021)
- Postcode: 6623

Bunjil is a small town in Western Australia located on the Mullewa Wubin Road 326 kilometres (203 mi) north of Perth in the Mid West region. At the 2021 census, it had a population of 61.

The townsite was gazetted in 1914, after being initially established as a railway siding on the Wongan Hills to Mullewa railway line in 1913 to allow transport of crops and stock. The name is Indigenous Australian in origin but its meaning is unknown.

In 1932 the Wheat Pool of Western Australia announced that the town would have two grain elevators, each fitted with an engine, installed at the railway siding.

The main industry in town is wheat farming with the town being a Cooperative Bulk Handling receival site.
