= Bunnawarra =

Pastoral lease in Western Australia

Coordinates: 28.609°S 116.574°E

Location in Western Australia

Bunnawarra or Bunnawarra Station is a pastoral lease operating as a sheep station in Western Australia.

It is located 31 kilometres (19 mi) south of Yalgoo and 104 kilometres (65 mi) east of Mullewa in the Mid-West region.

The property was initially established by Thomas P. Morrissey and his brother John F. Morrissey with their partner William Mooney in 1902. Mooney was later replaced by other members of the Morrissey family, Peter, William and Michael Morrissey forming the Morrissey Brothers partnership.

The property was well established by 1909 and was produced 80 bales of wool in that year, and 88 bales in 1912.

A flock of approximately 10,000 sheep were grazing the property in 1919. The Morrissey brothers had a good season in 1922, producing 127 bales of wool, and acquired Anketell Station near Paynesville later the same year. By 1925 the station produced 159 bales.

Michael Francis Morrissey died in 1927 in Mullewa. Morrissey and his wife were pioneers of the district and had previously worked at Yarragadee and Gullewa stations before settling at Bunnawarra. His wife, Jane, died in 1934, leaving their sons in charge of their pastoral interests. The sons T.P., J.F. and A. Morrissey were managing Bunnawarra, W. H. and M. J. Morrisset were running Noongall station, and P. M. Morrissey was overseeing Anketell Station.

The family partnership, Morrissey Brothers, was dissolved in 1938 with Thomas Patrick Morrissey, John Francis Morrissey and Michael Joseph Morrissey still carrying on business on their own account at Bunnawarra Station. The other family members remained at Anketell or Noongall or were paid out.

== See also ==
- List of pastoral leases in Western Australia
