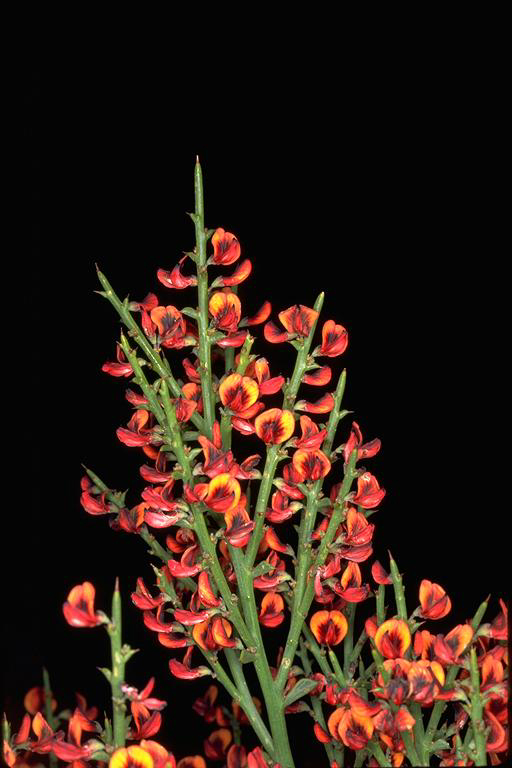

Scientific classification
- Kingdom: Plantae
- Clade: Tracheophytes
- Clade: Angiosperms
- Clade: Eudicots
- Clade: Rosids
- Order: Fabales
- Family: Fabaceae
- Subfamily: Faboideae
- Genus: Daviesia
- Species: D. oxyclada

Binomial name
- Daviesia oxyclada Crisp

= Daviesia oxyclada =

Species of flowering plant

Daviesia oxyclada is a species of flowering plant in the family Fabaceae and is endemic to the south-west of Western Australia. It is a densely-branched, glabrous shrub with spiny stems, vertically compressed, triangular phyllodes with the narrower end towards the base, and yellow or orange flowers with red markings.

== Description ==
Daviesia oxyclada is a densely-branched, glabrous shrub that typically grows to a height of up to about 60 cm (24 in) with spiny branchlets diverging at about 45° from the main stems. Its phyllodes are vertically compressed, triangular with the narrower end towards the base and sharply pointed, mostly 5–10 mm (0.20–0.39 in) long and 1–4 mm (0.039–0.157 in) high. The flowers are arranged singly or in pairs in leaf axils, each flower on a pedicel 0.5–2 mm (0.020–0.079 in) long with bracts about 1 mm (0.039 in) long at the base. The sepals are 1.5–2.0 mm (0.059–0.079 in) long and joined for most of their length apart from five small teeth. The standard petal is broadly egg-shaped with a notched centre, 6–8 mm (0.24–0.31 in) long and wide, and yellow or orange with a dark red base. The wings are 6.0–7.5 mm (0.24–0.30 in) long and red, the keel is 6.5–7.0 mm (0.26–0.28 in) long and dark red. Flowering occurs from May to August and the fruit is an inflated, triangular pod 9–12 mm (0.35–0.47 in) long.

== Taxonomy and naming ==
Daviesia oxyclada was first formally described in 1995 by Michael Crisp in Australian Systematic Botany from specimens collected by Charles Chapman in the Irwin district in 1976. The specific epithet (oxyclada) means "sharp branch".

== Distribution and habitat ==
This daviesia grows in kwongan between Moora, Eneabba and Mingenew in the Avon Wheatbelt and Geraldton Sandplains biogeographic regions of south-western Western Australia.

== Conservation status ==
Daviesia oxyclada is listed as "not threatened" by the Government of Western Australia Department of Biodiversity, Conservation and Attractions.
