= Three Springs =

Three Springs may refer to:

- Three Springs, Pennsylvania
- Three Springs, Western Australia
- Shire of Three Springs, Western Australia
