= Carnamah Historical Society =

Local history society in Western Australia

- Founded: 1983
- Type: Incorporated Association
- Location: Carnamah, Western Australia
- Origins: Carnamah Apex Club and Carnamah Restoration Society
- Website: www.carnamah.com.au

The Carnamah Historical Society collects, records, preserves and promotes the history of Carnamah, a town and farming community in the Mid West region of Western Australia.

The society was formed in 1983, established a museum in 1992, and created an online presence in 2003. It was subsequently profiled at the joint national conference of Museums Australia and Interpretation Australia in Perth in 2011. Its online content also resulted in Carnamah being featured at the National Museum of Australia in Canberra.

The society is an institutional member of Museums Australia, an affiliate of the Royal Western Australian Historical Society (RWAHS), and was the first Australian listing with the Society for One-Place Studies. At the RWAHS State History Conference in 2010 it was the recipient of the inaugural Affiliated Societies Merit Award for being a "dynamic, but very different society".

The society was the 2015 winner for contribution by a community-based organisation in the Western Australian Heritage Awards, which are conducted annually by the Heritage Council of Western Australia. The award citation attributed the society with using "cutting-edge technology to engage with and promote the heritage of, not only their own and neighbouring districts, but also the State".

== Museum ==
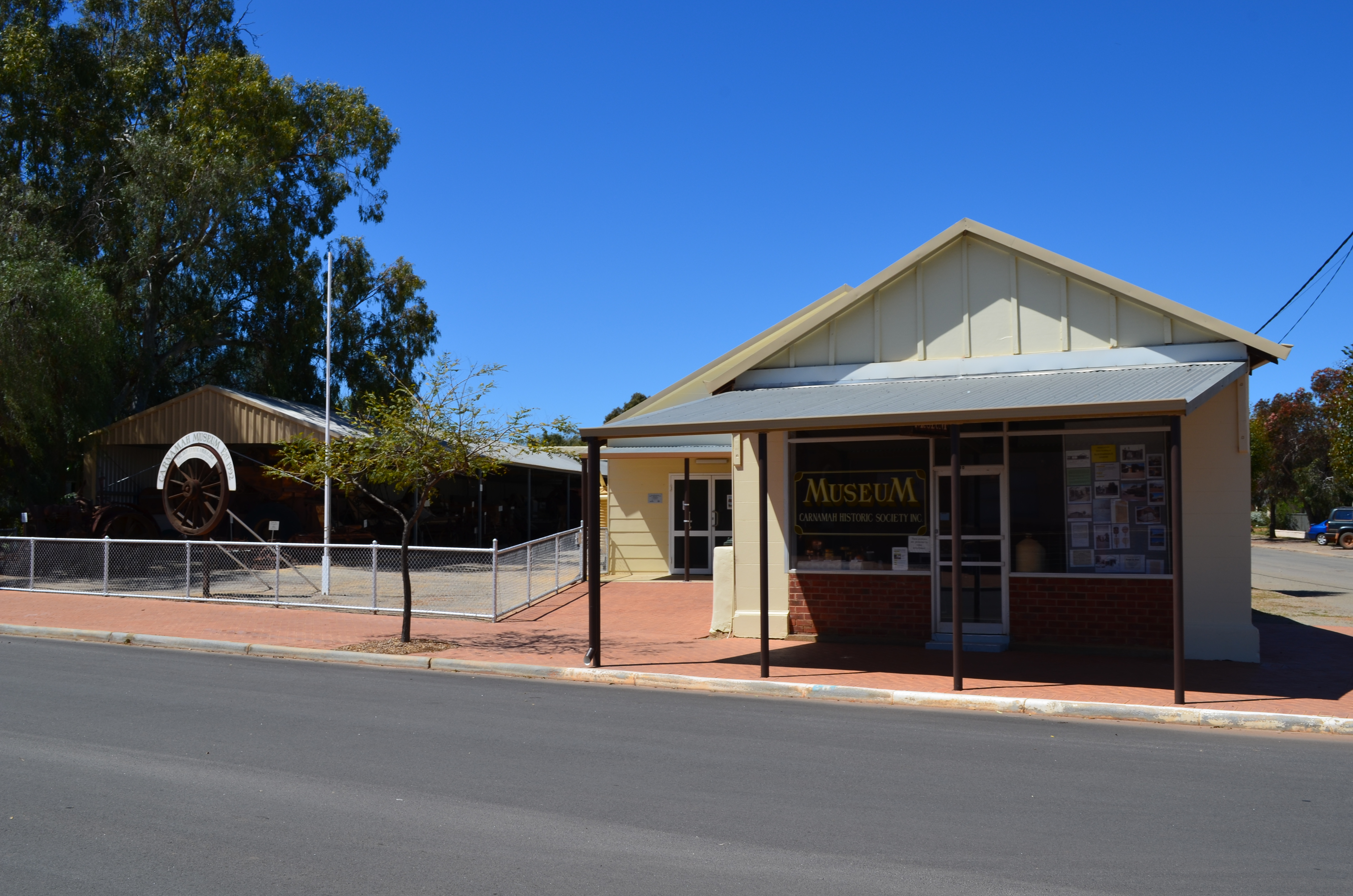
Carnamah Museum.

In 1992 the society established the Carnamah Museum near the centre of the Carnamah townsite. The museum contains a diverse collection of objects, tools, machinery, photographs, and ephemera relating to Carnamah’s social, domestic, commercial, and agricultural past.

In 2010 the society received a grant of $171,500 from Lotterywest to finance the extension of its museum. Additional financial and in-kind contributions were received from various sources including the Royalties for Regions Regional Grants Scheme and the Shire of Carnamah. The extension included the installation of a "Window to the Past" where an enlarged historic photograph of Carnamah's main street was fitted into an old window cavity (creating the illusion of looking through the window and into the past). The extended museum was officially opened on 15 September 2012 by Grant Woodhams, M.L.A. for Moore.

== Macpherson Homestead ==
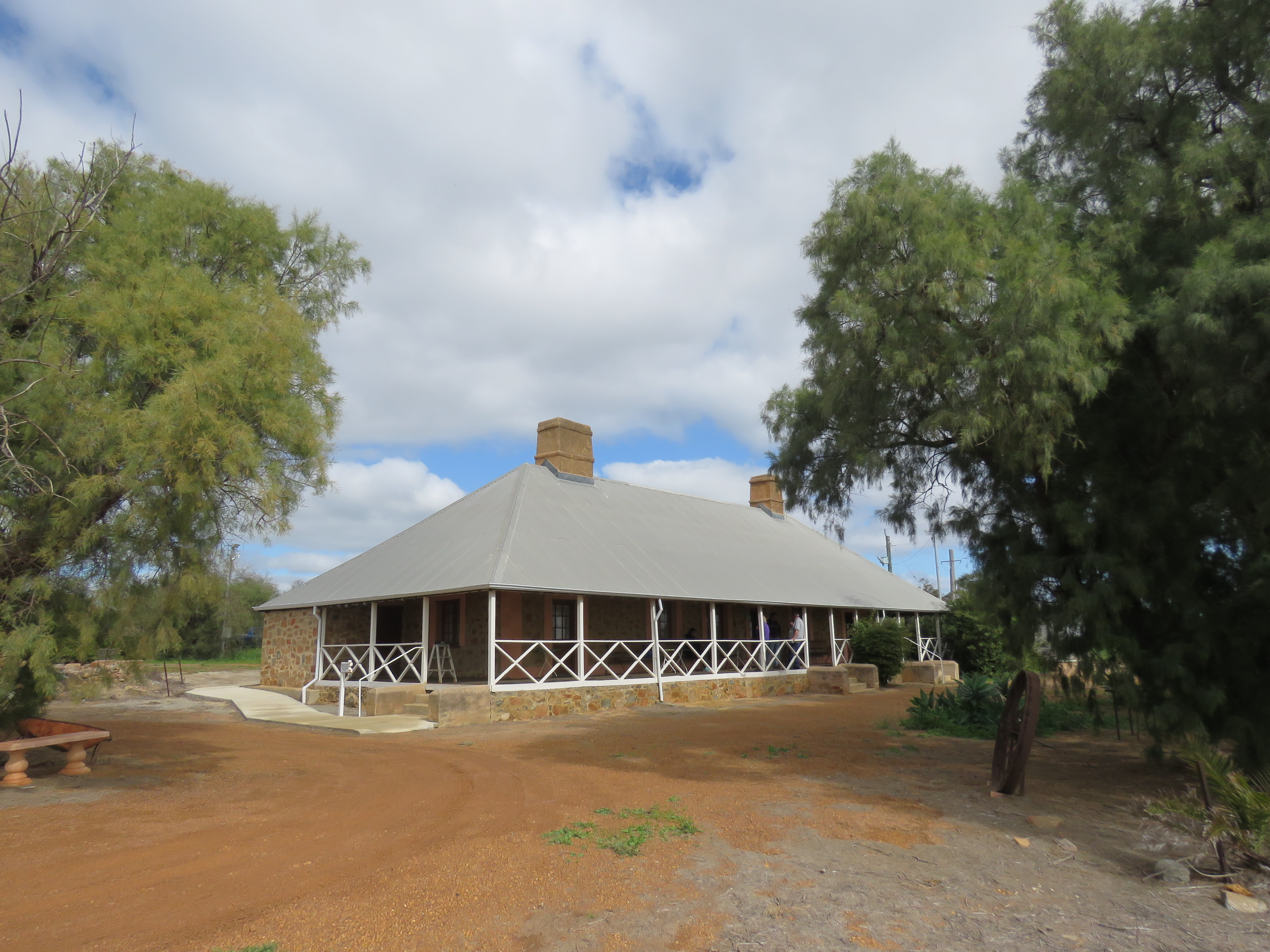
The Macpherson Homestead in August 2022

The society also cares for the Macpherson Homestead, located about one kilometre east of the Carnamah townsite. The stone homestead was built in the late 1860s and following deterioration was restored with locally raised funds and grants from Lotterywest. The homestead is permanently on the State Register of Heritage Places. The Heritage Council of Western Australia noted that "early settlers played an important and successful role in the development and growth of the Carnamah district" and that "the place has a particular structural interest, with its high walls and steeply pitched roof and bush rafters".

== Virtual existence ==
=== Website ===
The society began a website in 2003 and meets many of its organisational objectives online. While its museum collection relates primarily to the Carnamah district, the society has taken a more regional approach online allowing the development of Carnamah to be placed in a wider historical context.

Online content includes an extensive biographical dictionary, virtual museum, historical photographs, cemetery records, local histories and Australian Curriculum resources. On the recommendation of the State Library of Western Australia the society's website has been periodically archived for posterity since 2004 under the Preserving and Accessing Networked Documentary Resources of Australia (PANDORA) program.

=== Social media ===
In January 2010 the society entered the realm of social media by joining Facebook. It has also joined and attracted a following on Twitter, Flickr, Google+, Pinterest, Instagram and LinkedIn. The society uses social media to engage and interact with online followers about Carnamah's history, its museum and online content. As a result of exposure on social media the society and its activities were profiled in a two-page spread in the Nov-Dec 2011 issue of Inside History magazine and in the spring 2011 edition of Musing, the publication of Museums Australia WA.

The society was invited to contribute as a guest author to the blog of Collections Australia Network (CAN). The invitation was accepted however CAN ceased its operations a few weeks after four posts had been written. The society instead started its own blog in May 2011 and began blogging on a regular basis after publishing the posts intended for CAN. Blog posts cover a broad range of topics including museum happenings, website additions, historical pieces and featured photographs. The society's blog was named in Inside History magazine's Top 50 Blogs in 2012 and 2014 and contributed to The Busy Archivist's Blogging Tool Kit in 2012 by providing insight into blogging and how it can be used by small archives and societies.

=== Biographical Dictionary ===
The society, in collaboration with the North Midlands Project, produces the online Biographical Dictionary of Coorow, Carnamah and Three Springs. The dictionary contains referenced biographical and local information on thousands of people with a connection to the shires of Coorow, Carnamah or Three Springs. It is a merged and improved version of the society’s former Coorow-Waddy, Carnamah-Winchester and Three Springs databases.

The rationale behind this model is to tell the history of the district "one person at a time".

=== Virtual museum ===
The society added a virtual museum to its website in August 2011 to share its collection with a broader audience. It began with three virtual exhibitions, but was later expanded to a total of nine with support from the Department of Culture & the Arts (DCA). An image from Carnamah's virtual museum was the cover of the July–August 2013 edition of Inside History magazine. In 2013 the society began rolling out Australian Curriculum resources to accompany its virtual exhibitions with backing from the Western Australian History Foundation and DCA.

In May 2014 the society's Virtual Museum: to be known and distinguished as Carnamah was the Level 1 winner of the Permanent Exhibition category at the Museums and Galleries National Awards (MAGNA), which are conducted annually by Museums Australia. The MAGNA judges summarised the work as an innovative solution that was "very creative with excellent production values and interpretative images and narratives". The following year, in 2015, the accompanying education resources received a Highly Commended in the Level 1 Interpretation, Learning and Audience Engagement category of the same awards. The judges commented that they were "beautifully designed and comprehensive" and were "an exemplar for all local historical society/museums".

To commemorate the centenary of the Gallipoli landings, the society created an additional virtual exhibition on World War I in 2015.

=== Virtual volunteering ===
In May 2012 the society launched a virtual volunteering pilot to index electoral rolls, with the work contributing to its databases. "The aims of the program are to increase the output of the society, improve social inclusion and provide additional volunteering opportunities." In January 2013 the society received a $100,000 social innovation grant from the Government of Western Australia for the further development of its program. The funding, over a two-year period, covered research, development, trials, refinement and the sharing of structure and outcomes with other community sector organisations.

The society received a Highly Commended for Virtual Volunteering in the Innovation category of the 2015 Museums and Galleries National Awards. It was hailed as a "great socially inclusive project which addresses the needs of both the museum and the volunteer".

== Publications ==
As part of the Australian Bicentenary in 1988, the society published Westward to the Sea: Reminiscences & History of the Carnamah District 1861-1987. The book was compiled and written by P. R. Heydon, O.A.M.

In 2013 the society was a partner with Rail Heritage WA in gathering and providing content for the book Memories of the Midland Railway Co. of Western Australia. The book, written by Philippa Rogers, was launched in 2014 to commemorate 50 years since the railway was taken over by Western Australian Government Railways.

== Carnamah at the National Museum of Australia ==
One of the notable derivatives from the society's work is Carnamah's inclusion in the permanent exhibition Landmarks: People and Places across Australia at the National Museum of Australia (NMA) in Canberra. A curator at the NMA wanted to include Carnamah after discovering the society's website from an internet search on soldier settlement. Within one of the ten themes, Extending the Farmlands, is Carnamah's World War I soldier settlement. The section, with accompanying objects, includes the stories of five soldier settlers and their families with interpretative detail being largely sourced from the Carnamah-Winchester Database on the society's website. In 2013 the NMA published a book on the exhibition, titled Landmarks: A History of Australia in 33 Places, with Carnamah being featured as one of the 33.
