= Carnamah, Western Australia =

Carnamah
- Town
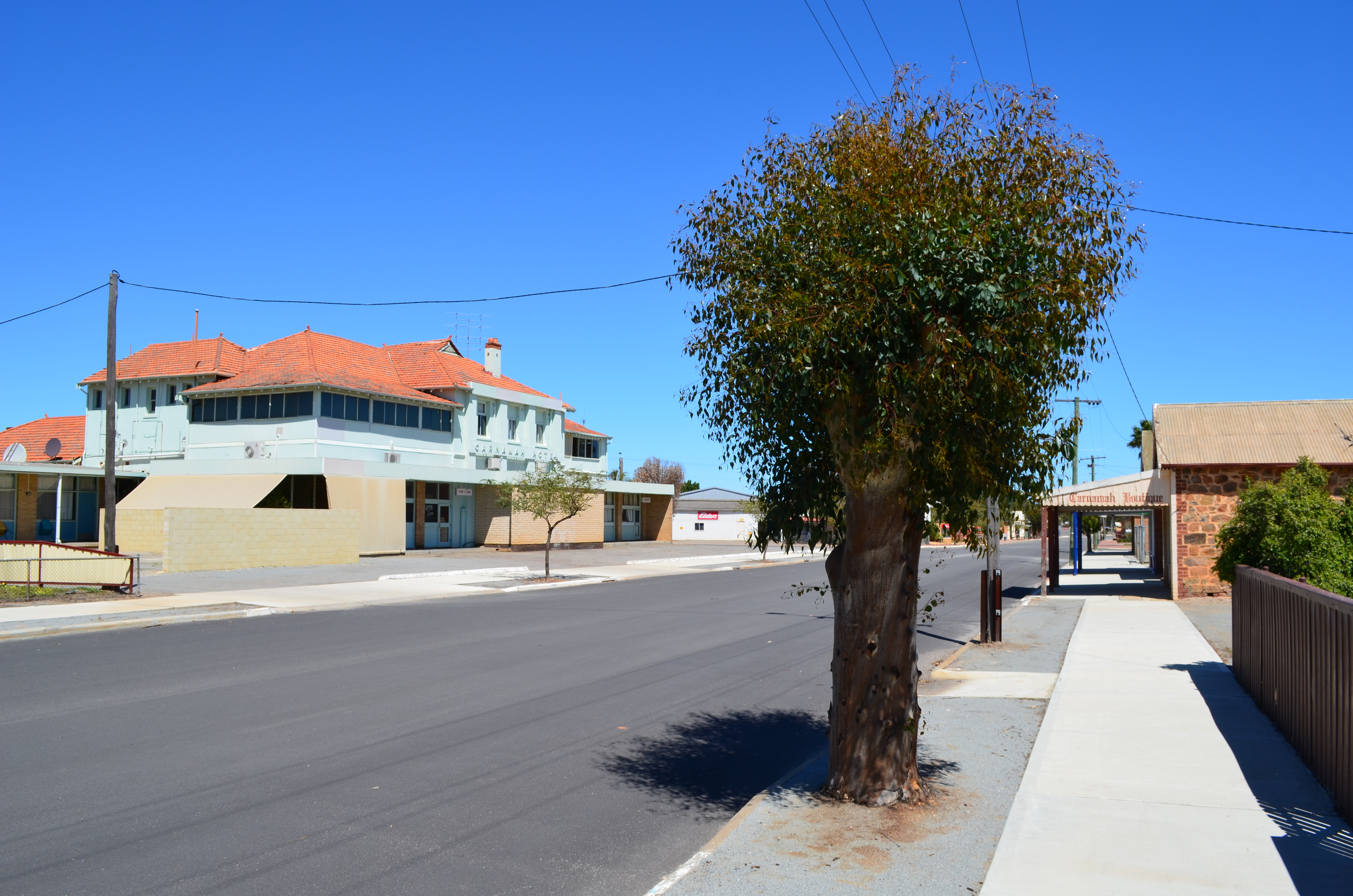
- Macpherson Street, Carnamah, 2012

- Interactive map of Carnamah
- Coordinates: 29.689°S 115.887°E
- Country: Australia
- State: Western Australia
- LGA: Shire of Carnamah
- Location: 307 km (191 mi) north of Perth; 21 km (13 mi) south east of Three Springs; 54 km (34 mi) south of Morawa
- Established: 1913

Government
  - State electorate: Moore
  - Federal division: Durack

Area
  - Total: 1,464.2 km^{2} (565.3 sq mi)
- Elevation: 273 m (896 ft)

Population
  - Total: 314 (UCL 2021)
- Postcode: 6517
- Mean max temp: 26.8 °C (80.2 °F)
- Mean min temp: 12.6 °C (54.7 °F)
- Annual rainfall: 376.0 mm (14.80 in)

Carnamah is a town in the Mid West region of Western Australia, about 307 kilometres (191 mi) north of Perth along the Midlands Road. At the 2021 census, the population of the town was 407.

The town was gazetted in 1913, and is named after "Carnamah", a pastoral property established by Duncan Macpherson in this location in the late 1860s. A telegraph station was established here in 1873, and is referred to in 1876 by the explorer Ernest Giles. Giles spells it "Cornamah" in his book, but "Carnamah" on his map. Macpherson's property "Carnamah" derives its name from Carnamah Spring. The name is probably Aboriginal of unknown meaning, or possibly is a Gaelic word meaning "cairn of the cattle" or "cattle rocks".

The Midland Railway line was constructed through the area in 1894, and a siding was built close to the Macpherson's homestead. This in turn led to further settlement of the area. The Carnamah Progress Association was formed in 1912, and the Carnamah State School was established, and in 1913 the townsite was declared.

In 1932 the Wheat Pool of Western Australia announced that the town would have two grain elevators, each fitted with an engine, installed at the railway siding.

The main industry in town is wheat farming, with the town being a Cooperative Bulk Handling receival site.

Carnamah is home to a 5:1 scale replica of a Chamberlain 40K. Unveiled in October 2024, it is the largest tractor sculpture in the world.

== Climate ==
Carnamah possesses a hot semi-arid climate (Köppen: BSh) with hot, dry summers and mild, somewhat rainy winters. Average maxima vary from 36.0 °C (96.8 °F) in January to 17.9 °C (64.2 °F) in July, while average minima fluctuate between 19.3 °C (66.7 °F) in February and 7.2 °C (45.0 °F) in August. Annual precipitation is rather low, (averaging 376.0 mm (14.80 in)), and is spread across 75.7 precipitation days. The town is sunny, experiencing 139.7 clear days and 61.6 cloudy days annually. Extreme temperatures have ranged from 48.1 °C (118.6 °F) on 23 January 1980 to −2.2 °C (28.0 °F) on 2 July 1948.

Climate data for Carnamah (29.69°S 115.89°E, 268 m AMSL) (1940-2024 normals & extremes, rainfall to 1887)
Month	Jan	Feb	Mar	Apr	May	Jun	Jul	Aug	Sep	Oct	Nov	Dec	Year
Record high °C (°F)	48.1 (118.6)	48.0 (118.4)	43.9 (111.0)	40.0 (104.0)	35.5 (95.9)	29.0 (84.2)	27.8 (82.0)	31.4 (88.5)	35.1 (95.2)	41.7 (107.1)	43.2 (109.8)	45.8 (114.4)	48.1 (118.6)
Mean daily maximum °C (°F)	36.0 (96.8)	35.6 (96.1)	32.7 (90.9)	27.6 (81.7)	22.5 (72.5)	19.0 (66.2)	17.9 (64.2)	19.2 (66.6)	22.0 (71.6)	26.1 (79.0)	30.0 (86.0)	33.5 (92.3)	26.8 (80.3)
Mean daily minimum °C (°F)	18.5 (65.3)	19.3 (66.7)	17.4 (63.3)	14.1 (57.4)	10.8 (51.4)	8.7 (47.7)	7.3 (45.1)	7.2 (45.0)	8.2 (46.8)	10.4 (50.7)	13.4 (56.1)	16.1 (61.0)	12.6 (54.7)
Record low °C (°F)	3.3 (37.9)	6.9 (44.4)	2.8 (37.0)	1.7 (35.1)	1.1 (34.0)	−0.6 (30.9)	−2.2 (28.0)	0.6 (33.1)	1.1 (34.0)	1.1 (34.0)	2.3 (36.1)	6.7 (44.1)	−2.2 (28.0)
Average precipitation mm (inches)	12.7 (0.50)	15.9 (0.63)	20.1 (0.79)	22.5 (0.89)	49.1 (1.93)	73.2 (2.88)	66.7 (2.63)	51.8 (2.04)	27.4 (1.08)	16.2 (0.64)	10.6 (0.42)	8.5 (0.33)	376.0 (14.80)
Average precipitation days (≥ 0.2 mm)	2.0	2.1	2.8	4.5	8.7	12.2	13.8	11.7	8.1	5.1	2.9	1.8	75.7
Average afternoon relative humidity (%)	26	28	31	39	46	51	56	51	46	33	28	27	39
Average dew point °C (°F)	10.9 (51.6)	11.4 (52.5)	10.9 (51.6)	10.8 (51.4)	9.1 (48.4)	7.6 (45.7)	7.9 (46.2)	7.1 (44.8)	7.5 (45.5)	6.9 (44.4)	7.7 (45.9)	9.6 (49.3)	9.0 (48.1)
Source: Bureau of Meteorology (1940-2024 normals & extremes, rainfall to 1887)

== See also ==
- Carnamah Historical Society
