= Yalgoo, Western Australia =

Yalgoo
- Town
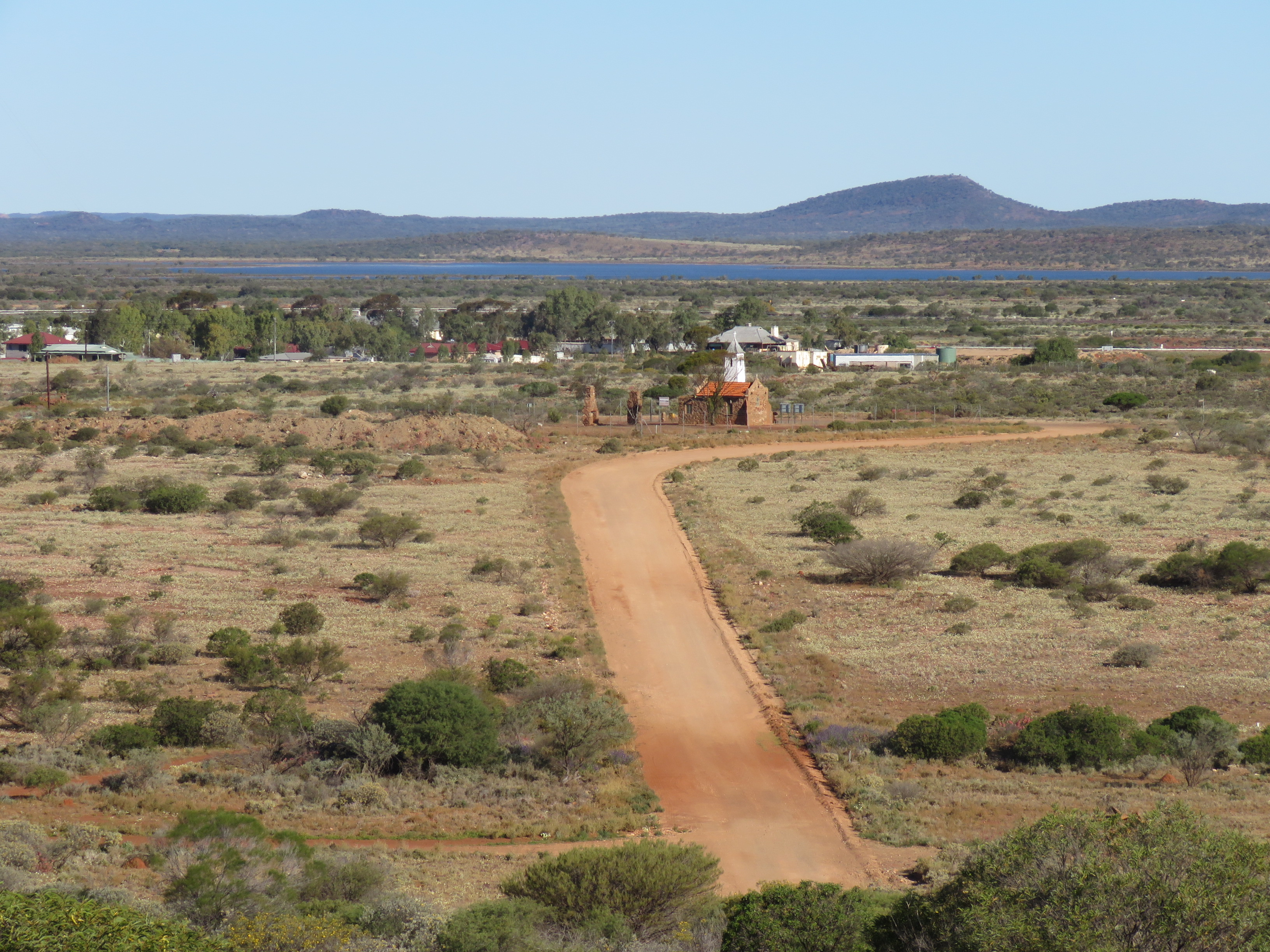
- View of Yalgoo from Yalgoo lookout, September 2021

- Interactive map of Yalgoo
- Coordinates: 28°20′00″S 116°41′00″E
- Country: Australia
- State: Western Australia
- LGA: Shire of Yalgoo
- Location: 499 km (310 mi) N of Perth; 219 km (136 mi) ENE of Geraldton; 118 km (73 mi) ENE of Mullewa
- Established: 1896

Government
  - State electorate: North West
  - Federal division: Durack

Area
  - Total: 16,996.2 km^{2} (6,562.3 sq mi)
- Elevation: 318 m (1,043 ft)

Population
  - Total: 313 (SAL 2021)
- Postcode: 6635
- Mean max temp: 27.9 °C (82.2 °F)
- Mean min temp: 13.2 °C (55.8 °F)
- Annual rainfall: 259.1 mm (10.20 in)

Yalgoo is a town in the Mid West region, 499 kilometres (310 mi) north-north-east of Perth, Western Australia and 118 kilometres (73 mi) east-north-east of Mullewa. Yalgoo is in the local government area of the Shire of Yalgoo.

Before it was settled as a town the Yalgoo area was used as grazing land for European settlers including the Morrissey and Broad families. Flocks of sheep were herded onto the rich pastures during the wet growing season and driven back to coastal properties for shearing before summer. Over time the graziers saw the value in the Yalgoo land and began to establish the first sheep stations.

== History ==
Gold was discovered in the area in the early 1890s, and by 1895 there were 120 men working the diggings and buildings being erected. The goldfield warden asked for a townsite to be surveyed and gazetted, and following survey the townsite of Yalgu was gazetted in January 1896.

It was once the location of an important railway station (opened in 1896) on the Northern Railway. Yalgoo's importance declined in the years after World War II after the forging of an all-weather road between Wubin and Paynes Find, across Lake Moore.

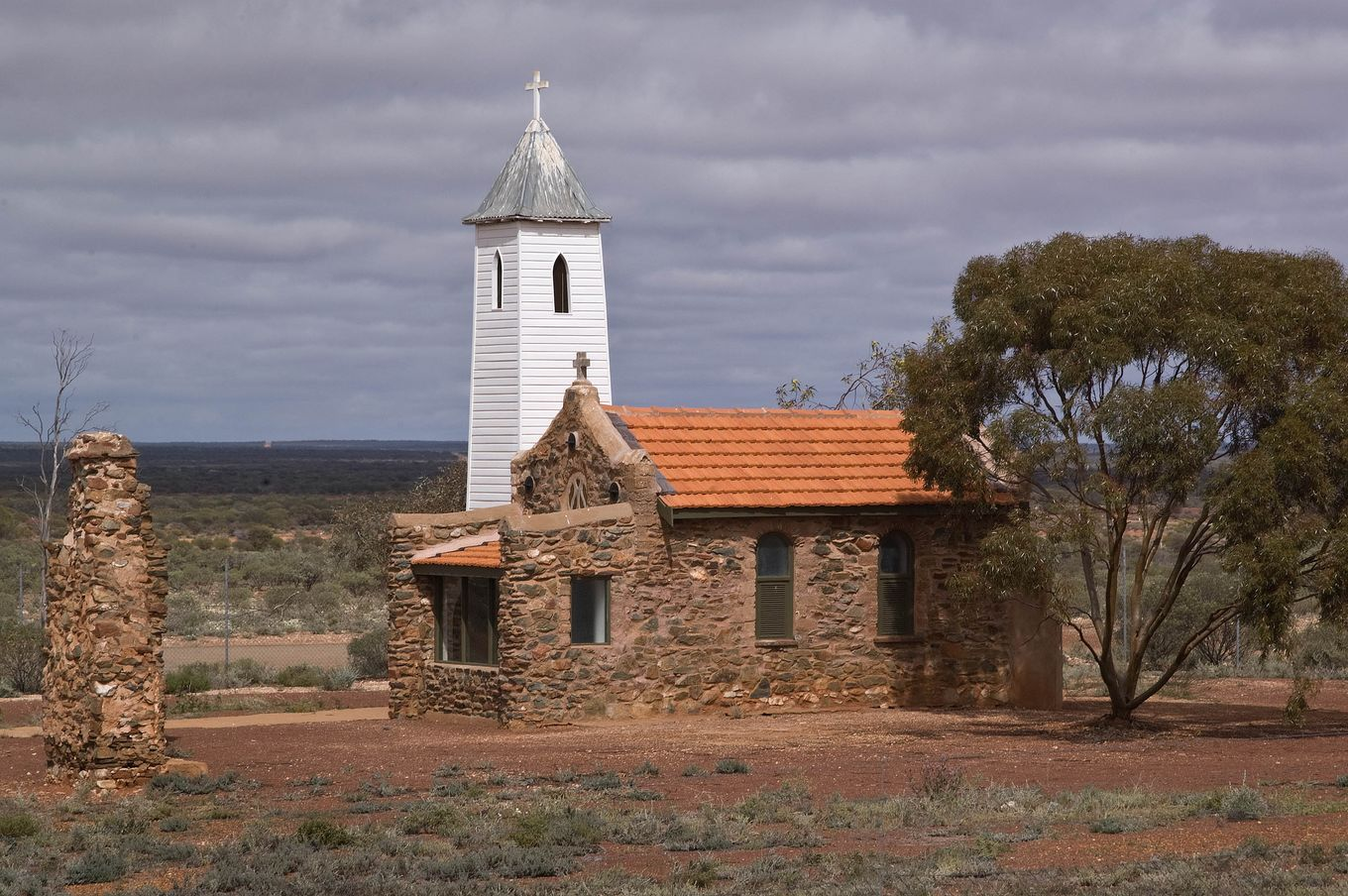
Convent of St Hyacinth, Yalgoo, 1922, side view

In early 1898 the population of the town was 650, 500 males and 150 females.

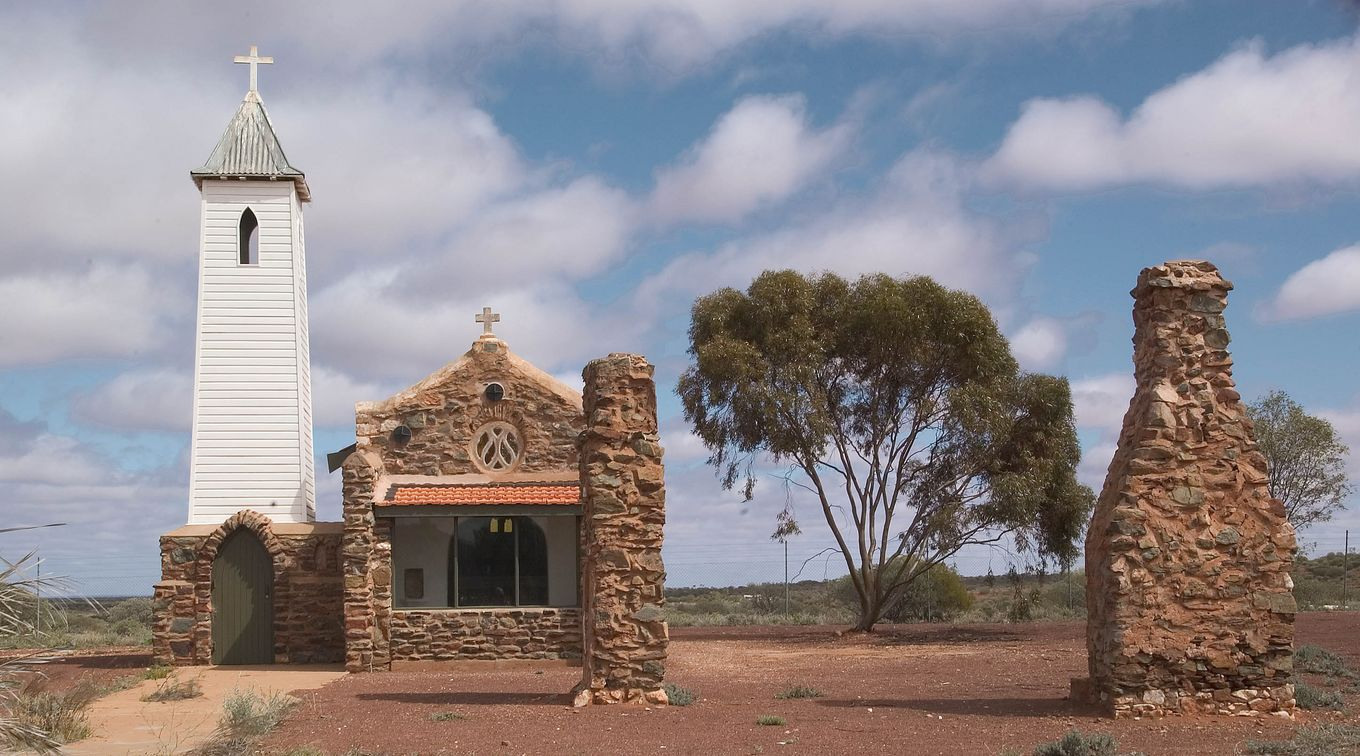
Convent of St Hyacinth, Yalgoo, 1922, front view

In 1921-22 the priest-architect and parish priest of Yalgoo (as well as of Mullewa), Monsignor John Hawes, designed and built the Dominican convent school and chapel of St Hyacinth: Yalgoo children attended the school until it was closed for lack of pupils in 1950. The timber-framed school building was dismantled and removed. The derelict chapel was restored and re-opened in 1981.

Erection of a state battery commenced in July 1931 and was completed in October of the same year.

== Etymology ==
Yalgoo is an Aboriginal name first recorded for Yalgoo Peak by the surveyor John Forrest in 1876. The name is said to mean "blood" or "place of blood", derived from the word "Yalguru". An alternative view is that it is derived from the Yalguru bush, which abounds in the area and has blood red sap.

The spelling Yalgu was used because of spelling rules for Aboriginal names adopted by the Lands & Surveys Department (the letter "u" best representing the "oo" sound). Within a month the Department of Lands and Surveys had decided reluctantly to use the original Yalgoo spelling, and this spelling has been used ever since. Some doubt about the spelling being officially changed resulted in an amendment from Yalgu to Yalgoo being gazetted in 1938.

== Climate ==
Yalgoo has a hot arid climate (BWh in the Köppen climate classification), a little too dry to be a hot semi-arid climate (BSh) and featuring sweltering summers and pleasant winters.

Climate data for Yalgoo
Month	Jan	Feb	Mar	Apr	May	Jun	Jul	Aug	Sep	Oct	Nov	Dec	Year
Record high °C (°F)	46.1 (115.0)	46.1 (115.0)	44.5 (112.1)	40.6 (105.1)	34.4 (93.9)	29.1 (84.4)	28.9 (84.0)	33.9 (93.0)	36.6 (97.9)	40.0 (104.0)	42.4 (108.3)	45.0 (113.0)	46.1 (115.0)
Mean daily maximum °C (°F)	37.2 (99.0)	36.3 (97.3)	33.5 (92.3)	28.5 (83.3)	23.0 (73.4)	19.2 (66.6)	18.2 (64.8)	20.0 (68.0)	24.0 (75.2)	27.5 (81.5)	32.1 (89.8)	35.5 (95.9)	27.9 (82.2)
Mean daily minimum °C (°F)	20.7 (69.3)	20.7 (69.3)	18.6 (65.5)	14.5 (58.1)	10.1 (50.2)	7.7 (45.9)	6.2 (43.2)	6.8 (44.2)	8.7 (47.7)	11.4 (52.5)	15.2 (59.4)	18.4 (65.1)	13.2 (55.8)
Record low °C (°F)	9.4 (48.9)	10.0 (50.0)	6.8 (44.2)	3.9 (39.0)	−0.3 (31.5)	−1.1 (30.0)	−2.5 (27.5)	−0.6 (30.9)	−0.6 (30.9)	0.4 (32.7)	4.4 (39.9)	7.0 (44.6)	−2.5 (27.5)
Average rainfall mm (inches)	15.8 (0.62)	25.1 (0.99)	25.2 (0.99)	20.8 (0.82)	31.3 (1.23)	41.5 (1.63)	35.2 (1.39)	25.7 (1.01)	11.7 (0.46)	8.2 (0.32)	8.0 (0.31)	11.1 (0.44)	260.8 (10.27)
Average rainy days	2.5	2.9	3.1	3.1	5.2	8.0	7.8	6.3	3.6	2.5	1.8	1.8	48.6

== Use of name ==
The name Yalgoo is also used as a name for a crater on the planet Mars, without specifically commemorating the town.

== See also ==
- Yalgoo bioregion - the ecological region
- Thundelarra
- December 2010 Gascoyne River flood
