= Shire of Carnamah =

Coordinates: 29°41′13″S 115°53′31″E

- Local government area
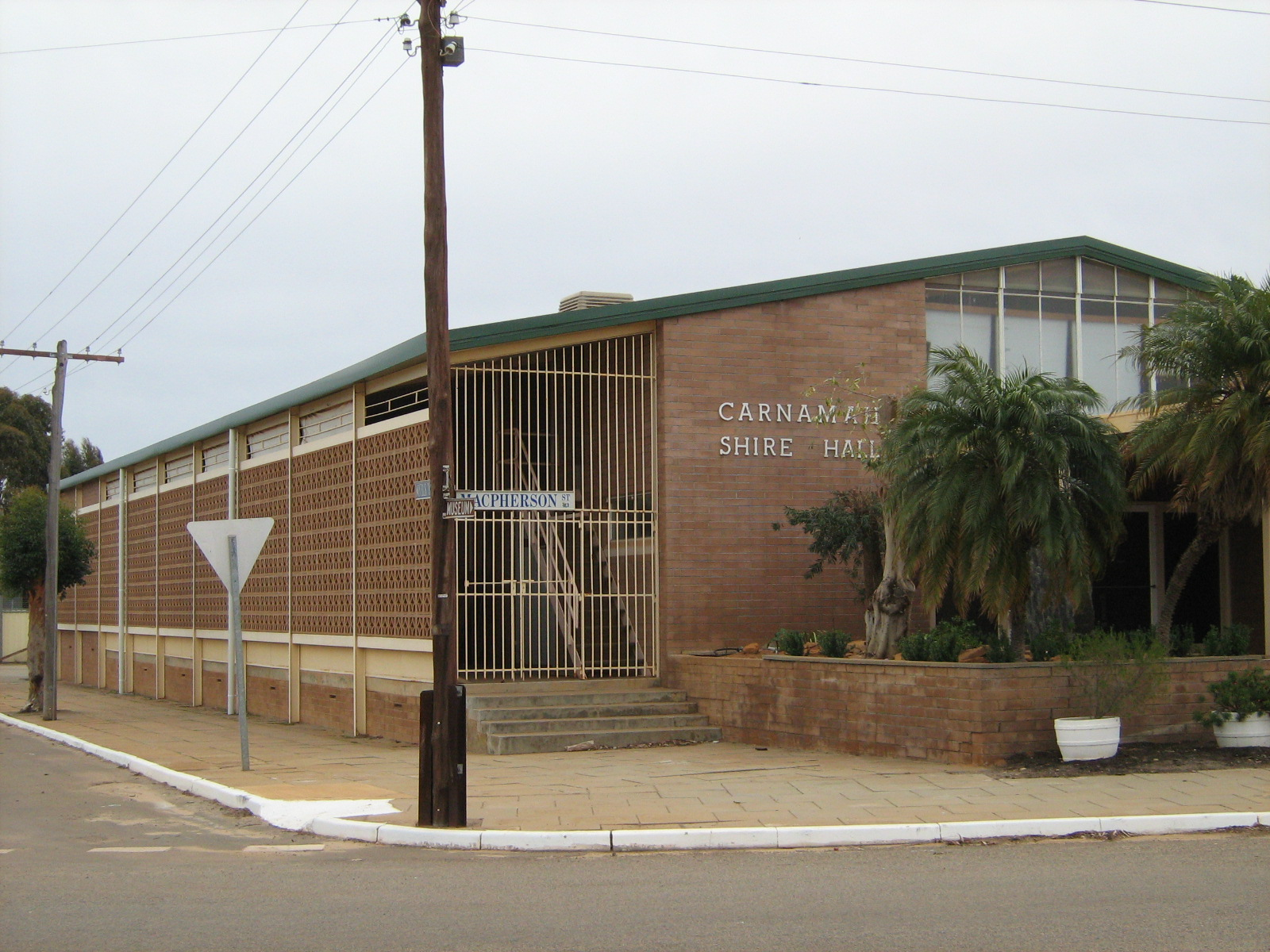
- Carnamah Shire Hall, 2007

- Interactive map of Shire of Carnamah
- Country: Australia
- State: Western Australia
- Region: Mid West
- Established: 1923
- Council seat: Carnamah

Government
  - Shire President: Merle Isbister
  - State electorate: Moore
  - Federal division: Durack

Area
  - Total: 2,876.4 km^{2} (1,110.6 sq mi)

Population
  - Total: 552 (LGA 2021)
- Website: Shire of Carnamah
LGAs around Shire of Carnamah
Irwin	Three Springs	Perenjori
Indian Ocean	Shire of Carnamah	Perenjori
Indian Ocean	Coorow	Coorow

The Shire of Carnamah is a local government area located in the Mid West region of Western Australia, about 310 kilometres (193 mi) north of Perth, the state capital, and about 181 kilometres (112 mi) south of the city of Geraldton. The Shire covers an area of 2,876 square kilometres (1,110 sq mi) and its seat of government is the town of Carnamah.

== History ==
The Carnamah Road District was formed out of land previously managed by the Irwin and Mingenew Road Boards on 24 August 1923. On 1 July 1961, it became a Shire under the Local Government Act 1960. On 19 April 1962, it lost three-fifths of its area when the Shire of Coorow was created.

The Shire of Carnamah has seven elected Councillors. Councillors are elected by residents of the Shire and represent the whole Shire.

The President and Deputy President are elected by the Councillors after every election.

Elections are held in October every two years and half of the Council is due for re-election.

== Towns and localities ==
The towns and localities of the Shire of Carnamah with population and size figures based on the most recent Australian census:

Locality	Population	Area	Map
Carnamah	407 (SAL 2021)	1,464.2 km^{2} (565.3 sq mi)	
Eneabba	142 (SAL 2021)	1,407.6 km^{2} (543.5 sq mi)	

== Population ==
Historical population

Year	Pop.	±% p.a.
1933	1,373	—
1947	1,025	−2.07%
1954	1,741	+7.86%
1961	1,701	−0.33%
1966	996	−10.15%
1971	925	−1.47%
1976	1,411	+8.81%
1981	1,245	−2.47%

Year	Pop.	±% p.a.
1986	1,418	+2.64%
1991	1,148	−4.14%
1996	1,039	−1.98%
2001	850	−3.94%
2006	749	−2.50%
2011	546	−6.13%
2016	548	+0.07%
2021	552	+0.15%

== Heritage-listed places ==
As of 2023, 70 places are heritage-listed in the Shire of Carnamah, of which one is on the State Register of Heritage Places, the Macpherson Homestead. The homestead, which was State Heritage-listed in April 1995, dates back to 1870.
