= Perenjori, Western Australia =

Perenjori
- Town
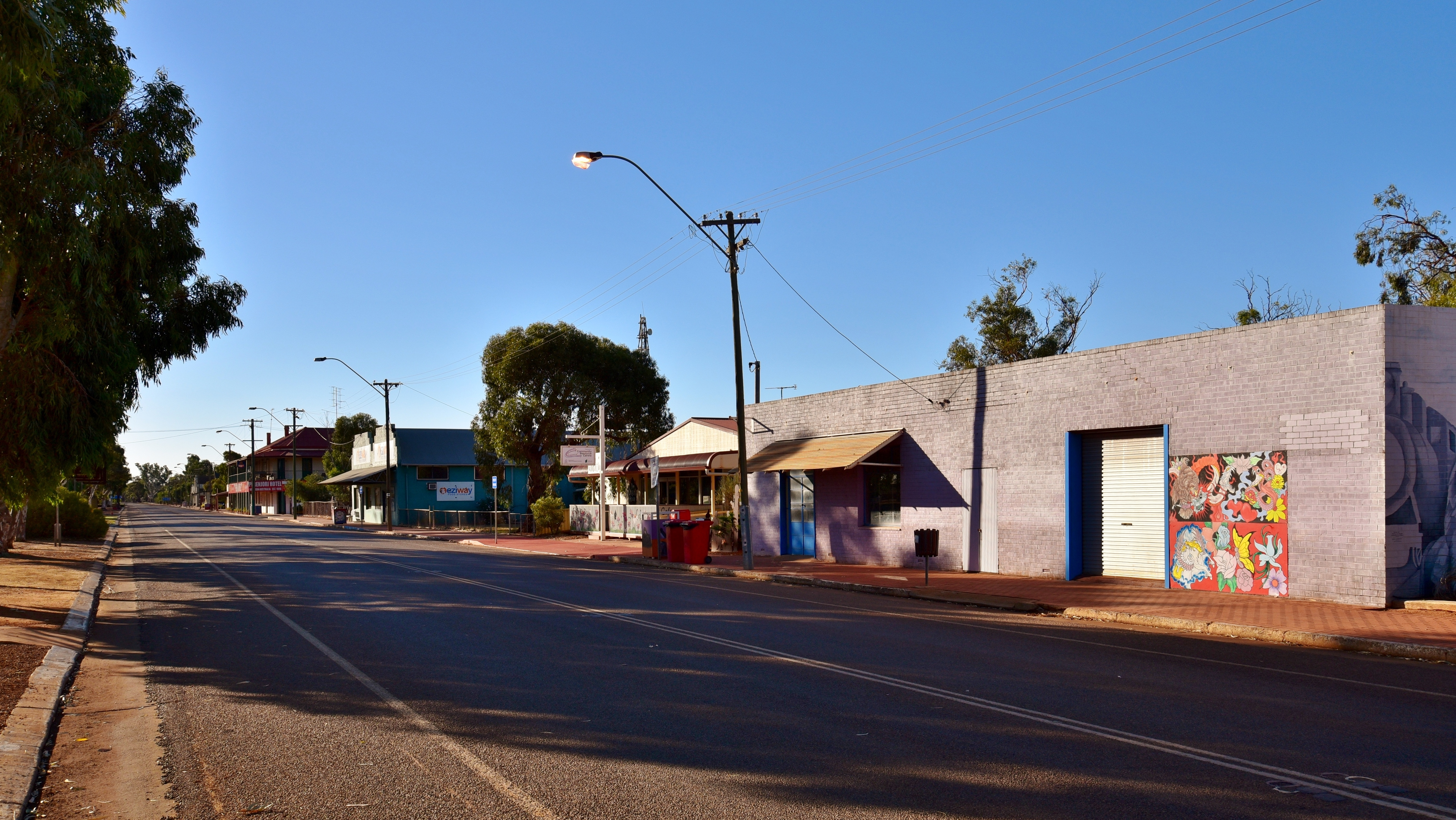
- Fowler Street, Perenjori, 2018

- Interactive map of Perenjori
- Coordinates: 29.443°S 116.285°E
- Country: Australia
- State: Western Australia
- LGA: Shire of Perenjori
- Location: 348 km (216 mi) north of Perth; 39 km (24 mi) south east of Morawa
- Established: 1916

Government
  - State electorate: Moore
  - Federal division: Durack
- Elevation: 325 m (1,066 ft)

Population
  - Total: 259 (2021 census)
- Postcode: 6620

Perenjori is a townsite in the northern agricultural region, 348 kilometres (216 mi) north of Perth and 39 kilometres (24 mi) south-east of Morawa. It is located on the Avon Yard to Mullewa railway line which was opened in 1915. Perenjori was approved as the name of a siding in April 1913, and later that year the government decided to establish a townsite there. Perenjori townsite was gazetted in 1916.

In 1932, the Wheat Pool of Western Australia announced that the town would have two grain elevators, each fitted with an engine, installed at the railway siding.

== Overview ==
Perenjori is the Aboriginal name of a nearby water source, Perenjori Rockhole, being first recorded in 1911 when land was set aside for a water reserve at the rockhole. The rockhole was sometimes spelt Perengory or Perangery, and it is believed the name may be derived from the Peranj-jiddee bush which surrounded the rockhole. The bush is similar to the Black Wattle.

The surrounding areas produce wheat and other cereal crops. A bulk wheat bin was constructed in the town in January 1940, which is capable of holding about 220,000 bushels. The town is a receival site for the CBH Group.

== History ==
Dan Woodall was the first permanent settler in the areas. He came to the area in 1905 to manage Perangery Station, then owned by the Lee Steere family. In 1906, the four Farrell brothers came to the area to take up land. The Lands Department approved agricultural lots of 1,000 acres instead of the large pastoral leases which had been granted in the past. Perenjori was declared a town on 16 February 1916.

== Tourism ==
Perenjori is on the Wildflower Way—a tourist drive that runs from Dalwallinu to Geraldton. Late August to October is the wildflower season and, depending upon the season, the countryside may be alive with flowers including orchids, carpets of white, pink and yellow everlastings and the unique wreath leschenaultia.

== Transport ==
In 2010, WestNet was building a loading point for iron ore traffic. Iron ore was hauled by road 85 kilometres (53 mi) from Mount Gibson, loaded onto railway wagons for haulage 239 kilometres (149 mi) to Geraldton where ships of up to 60,000 DWT are loaded. The loader was completed in December 2011.
