= Thundelarra =

Conservation reserve in Western Australia

Coordinates: 28°53′31″S 117°07′50″E

Location in Western Australia

Thundelarra is a conservation reserve that was previously run as a pastoral lease in Western Australia, located 70 kilometres (43 mi) south east of Yalgoo and 160 kilometres (99 mi) north of Dalwallinu in the Murchison region.

== Description ==
It was a traditional sheep station until having the lease transferred to a nature conservation estate in 2006. It is recognised as an important parcel of land that links the western and eastern ends of other conservation estates, also once pastoral leases, which were purchased since 1995. The area lies in the Yalgoo IBRA region and is characterised by open mulga woodlands and sandy scrubland. The area is rich in ephemerals and is noted for its rich wildflower displays in spring.

== History ==
Prior to 1891 the station was owned by Samuel Eakins and S. F. Moore. These partners sold the property in 1897; at the time it occupied an area of 200,000 acres (80,937 ha) and was carrying 1,490 sheep, 7 head of cattle and 10 horses.

Dingoes were a large problem at the station, prompting the station owner, Chas Beaton, to write to the Minister of Lands to ask that the bounty for dingoes to be increased. The station continued to prosper, selling 76 bales of wool at the Colonial Wool Sales in London in 1906, and 106 bales in 1907.

A carpenter named Philip Lothar Scheer, committed suicide at the station in 1910. Donald Beaton, E.A Marsh and H. Stanbridge were empanelled on the jury to conduct an inquest into the man's death. They determined that Scheer died as the result of a self-inflicted gunshot to the mouth while in a fit of temporary insanity.

The station sold 167 bales of wool at the London wool sales in January 1910, followed by 87 bales in December the same year then another 85 bales in February 1911 and 25 more bales in April the same year.

The flock size in 1912 was estimated at 15,000 sheep, with shearing set to commence in early September in the six-stand shearing shed.

The lease transferred to a nature conservation estate in 2006.

The lessee in 2012 was the Conservation and Land Management Executive body.

== Lignum Swamp ==
The station also contains the 13,500-hectare (33,359-acre) Thundelarra Lignum Swamp. The wetland is a shrub dominated fresh water marsh with a sandy-clay bed. It lies in a sump that is slightly undulating interspersed with low rocky hills. The wetland receives water from a creek system that originated in a range situated about 25 km away. Filling every five to ten years the wetland reaches a depth of about 1.5m and is regarded as an important habitat and breeding ground for water birds.

== See also ==
- List of ranches and stations
