= Shire of Irwin =

Coordinates: 29°15′04″S 114°55′52″E

- Local government area
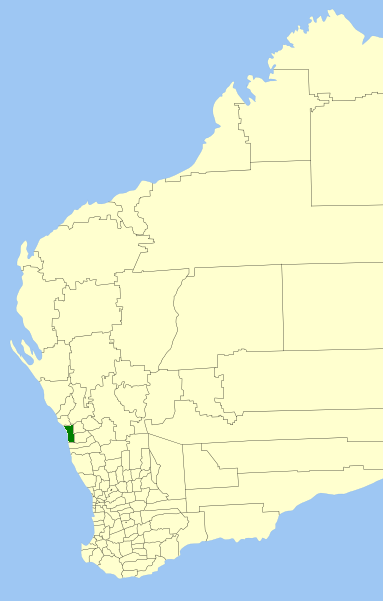
- Location in Western Australia

- Interactive map of Shire of Irwin
- Country: Australia
- State: Western Australia
- Region: Mid West
- Council seat: Dongara

Government
  - Shire President: Michael Smith
  - State electorate: Moore
  - Federal division: Durack

Area
  - Total: 2,374.4 km^{2} (916.8 sq mi)

Population
  - Total: 3,680 (LGA 2021)
- Website: Shire of Irwin
LGAs around Shire of Irwin
Indian Ocean	Greater Geraldton	Greater Geraldton
Indian Ocean	Shire of Irwin	Mingenew
Indian Ocean	Carnamah	Three Springs

The Shire of Irwin is a local government area in the Mid West region of Western Australia, about 50 kilometres (30 mi) south of Geraldton and about 360 kilometres (220 mi) north of the state capital, Perth. The Shire covers an area of 2,374 square kilometres (917 sq mi), and its seat of government is the town of Dongara.

== History ==
The Irwin Road District was created on 24 January 1871 as one of the first regional local government areas in Western Australia. Before this, it was the "Victoria District". On 16 June 1916, Irwin received a large land area from the Upper Irwin Road Board shortly before that entity's dissolution. Sections of the district separated as part of the formation of the Carnamah Road District on 24 August 1923 and the Three Springs Road District on 2 November 1928.

On 1 July 1961, it became a shire following the passage of the Local Government Act 1960, which reformed all remaining road districts into shires.

In June 2015, Irwin declared itself gasfield free.

== Population ==
Historical population

Year	Pop.	±% p.a.
1933	555	—
1947	465	−1.26%
1954	611	+3.98%
1961	657	+1.04%
1966	810	+4.28%
1971	941	+3.04%
1976	1,196	+4.91%
1981	1,578	+5.70%

Year	Pop.	±% p.a.
1986	1,905	+3.84%
1991	2,100	+1.97%
1996	2,433	+2.99%
2001	2,810	+2.92%
2006	3,052	+1.67%
2011	3,567	+3.17%
2016	3,569	+0.01%
2021	3,680	+0.61%

== Wards ==
The Shire is divided into four wards:

- Denison Ward (four councillors)
- North Ward (two councillors)
- South East Ward (two councillors)
- Town Ward (two councillors)

== Towns and localities ==
The towns and localities of the Shire of Irwin with population and size figures based on the most recent Australian census:

Locality	Population	Area	Map
Allanooka	19 (SAL 2016)	323.6 km^{2} (124.9 sq mi)	
Arrowsmith	17 (SAL 2021)	821.7 km^{2} (317.3 sq mi)	
Bonniefield	217 (SAL 2021)	53.9 km^{2} (20.8 sq mi)	
Bookara	149 (SAL 2021)	141.4 km^{2} (54.6 sq mi)	
Dongara	1,393 (SAL 2021)	8.3 km^{2} (3.2 sq mi)	
Irwin	72 (SAL 2021)	5.6 km^{2} (2.2 sq mi)	
Milo	16 (SAL 2021)	201.4 km^{2} (77.8 sq mi)	
Mount Adams	8 (SAL 2021)	293.3 km^{2} (113.2 sq mi)	
Mount Horner	13 (SAL 2021)	258.2 km^{2} (99.7 sq mi)	
Port Denison	1,452 (SAL 2021)	15 km^{2} (5.8 sq mi)	
Springfield	276 (SAL 2021)	14.7 km^{2} (5.7 sq mi)	
Yardarino	48 (SAL 2021)	234.3 km^{2} (90.5 sq mi)	

== Notable councillors ==
- Samuel James Phillips, Irwin Road Board member 1883; later a state MP
- Charles Maley, Upper Irwin Road Board member 1907–1929; also a state MP

== Heritage-listed places ==
As of 2023, 157 places are heritage-listed in the Shire of Irwin, of which 16 are on the State Register of Heritage Places.
