= Local Government Act 1995 =

Act of the Parliament of Western Australia

Parliament of Western Australia
- Long title: An Act to provide for a system of local government in Western Australia, to amend the Local Government Act 1960 and for related purposes.
- Citation: No. 74 of 1995
- Royal assent: 9 January 1996

The Local Government Act 1995 is an act of the Parliament of Western Australia which lays down the responsibilities, powers, and procedures for election of local government bodies. It replaced and amended the Local Government Act 1960.
