= Shire of Perenjori =

Coordinates: 29°26′35″S 116°17′06″E

- Local government area
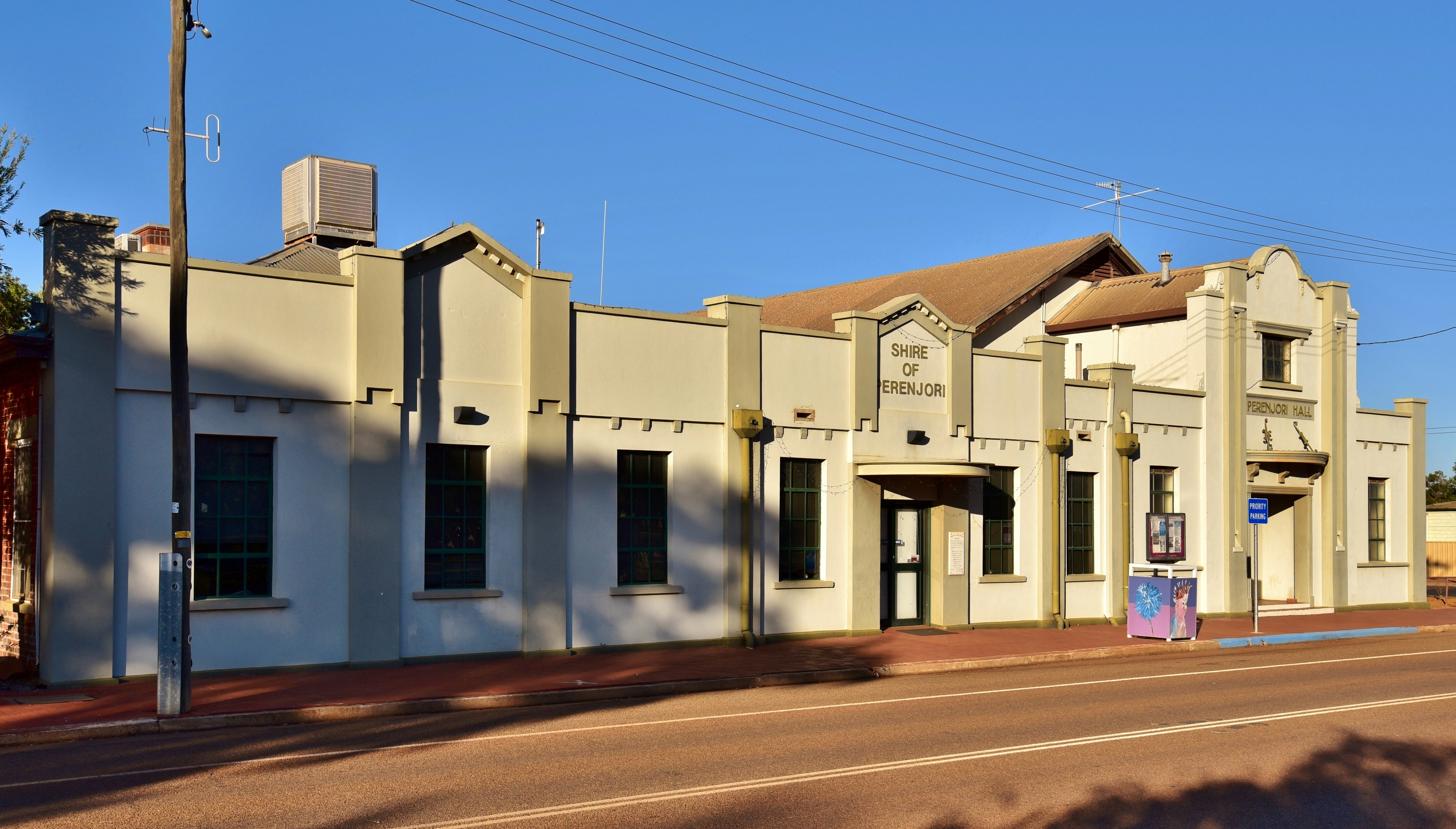
- Perenjori Shire Hall & Offices, 2018

- Interactive map of Shire of Perenjori
- Country: Australia
- State: Western Australia
- Region: Mid West
- Council seat: Perenjori

Government
  - Shire President: Chris King
  - State electorate: Moore
  - Federal division: Durack

Area
  - Total: 8,313.0 km^{2} (3,209.7 sq mi)

Population
  - Total: 629 (LGA 2021)
- Website: Shire of Perenjori
LGAs around Shire of Perenjori
Morawa	Yalgoo	Yalgoo
Three Springs	Shire of Perenjori	Yalgoo
Coorow	Dalwallinu	Dalwallinu

The Shire of Perenjori is a local government area in the Mid West region of Western Australia, about 360 kilometres (224 mi) north of the state capital, Perth. The Shire covers an area of 8,313 square kilometres (3,210 sq mi), and its seat of government is the town of Perenjori.

== History ==
The Shire of Perenjori originated as the Perenjori Road District, established on 27 April 1928 when the Perenjori-Morawa Road District (which had separated from the Upper Irwin Road District in 1916), split into separate Perenjori and Morawa road districts.

On 1 July 1961, Perenjori became a shire following the passage of the Local Government Act 1960, which reformed all remaining road districts into shires.

On 18 September 2009, the Shires of Mingenew, Three Springs, Morawa and Perenjori announced their intention to amalgamate. A formal agreement was signed five days later, and the name Billeranga was later chosen. However, by February 2011, community pressure had led to the negotiations stalling, and on 16 April 2011, voters from the Shire of Perenjori defeated the proposal at a referendum.

== Wards ==
The Shire is divided into five wards:

- Perenjori Ward (three councillors)
- Caron Ward (one councillor)
- Latham/Caron Ward (two councillors)
- Bowgada Ward (two councillors)
- Maya Ward (1 councillor)

== Towns and localities ==
The towns and localities of the Shire of Perenjori with population and size figures based on the most recent Australian census:

Locality	Population	Area	Map
Bowgada	33 (SAL 2021)	770.2 km^{2} (297.4 sq mi)	
Bunjil	61 (SAL 2021)	1,926.2 km^{2} (743.7 sq mi)	
Latham	61 (SAL 2021)	662.1 km^{2} (255.6 sq mi)	
Maya	20 (SAL 2021)	570.5 km^{2} (220.3 sq mi)	
Perenjori	259 (SAL 2021)	880 km^{2} (340 sq mi)	
Rothsay	197 (SAL 2021)	3,490.1 km^{2} (1,347.5 sq mi)	

== Population ==
Historical population

Year	Pop.	±% p.a.
1933	1,275	—
1947	956	−2.04%
1954	1,277	+4.22%
1961	1,311	+0.38%
1966	1,311	+0.00%
1971	1,204	−1.69%
1976	1,167	−0.62%
1981	1,005	−2.94%

Year	Pop.	±% p.a.
1986	823	−3.92%
1991	772	−1.27%
1996	684	−2.39%
2001	600	−2.59%
2006	528	−2.52%
2011	904	+11.35%
2016	617	−7.35%
2021	629	+0.39%

== Heritage-listed places ==
As of 2023, 47 places are heritage-listed in the Shire of Perenjori, of which three are on the State Register of Heritage Places.
