= Local government areas of Western Australia =

Local government administrative areas in Western Australia

Map of local government areas in Western Australia

There are 137 local government areas (LGAs) in Western Australia, which comprise 27 cities, 102 shires, and 8 towns that manage their own affairs to the extent permitted by the Local Government Act 1995. The Local Government Act 1995 also makes provision for regional local governments (referred to as "regional councils", established by two or more local governments for a particular purpose.

There are three classifications of local government in Western Australia:

- City – predominantly urban, plus seven significant regional centres
- Shire – predominantly rural or outer suburban areas, plus the Shire of Peppermint Grove
- Town – predominantly inner urban, plus the Town of Port Hedland

The Shire of Christmas Island and the Shire of Cocos (Keeling) Islands are federal external territories and covered by the Indian Ocean Territories (Administration of Laws) Act 1992, which allows the Western Australian Local Government Act 1995 to apply "on-island" as though it were a Commonwealth act. Nonetheless, Christmas Island and the Cocos (Keeling) Islands are not parts of Western Australia.

== History ==
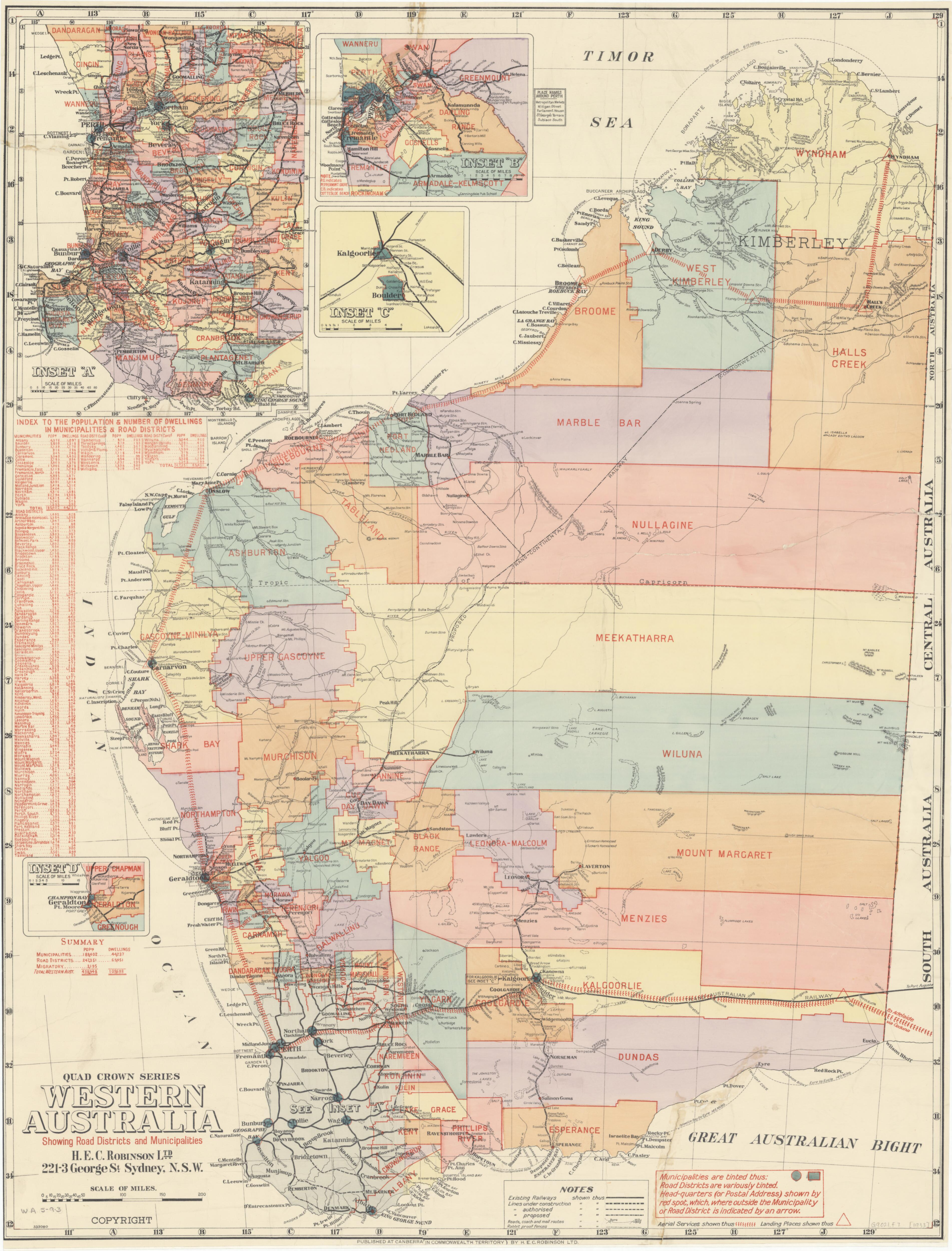
Map of local government areas in 1933

Land was originally granted in the Swan River Colony under regulations which allowed for land commissioners to assess a tax on private allotments to fund the construction and maintenance of "roads, paths and plantations". As the Colony began to develop, the first form of local government was established in some areas under the Towns Improvement Act 1838. These trusts were empowered to elect ratepayers as trustees and assess and collect a property tax for the construction of roads. Many of these town trusts, including the Perth Town Trust, experienced severe administrative and financial difficulties, and in some cases barely functioned at all. The Guildford Town Trust lasted only a couple of years before ceasing to function until it was reconstituted in 1863.

The District Roads Act 1871 and Municipal Institutions' Act 1871 improved matters by allowing for the establishment of roads boards and municipal corporations. Municipal corporations had the capacity to levy property taxes, pass municipal by-laws and undertake various local regulatory services previously carried out by colonial officials and other central bodies. Corporations could also establish civic institutions and facilities with the governors' consent, including libraries and botanical gardens. Road Boards where strictly limited to the construction of roads, could not levy property taxes and depended on colonial government grants for any expenditures.

Women were permitted to be elected to road boards from 1911 and to municipal corporations from 1919. The influence of town clerk W. E. Bold and the Greater Perth Movement around this time led to the amalgamation of inner city local governments to create a greatly expanded City of Perth until 1993, when the City was broken up once again.

The first local government department was established by the state in 1949 to guide local government authorities. Following the war local governments increasingly expanded their services from property, health and local infrastructure (roads, drainage) to community and social services. This was termed the "New Order" at the time, and encompassed the development of community centres, infant health clinics and sporting facilities.

Only a few cities – Fremantle, Nedlands, Perth, South Perth, and Subiaco – existed prior to 1961. On 1 July 1961, all road districts became shires, and all municipalities became towns or cities. This structure has continued till the present day.

In the 1970s, the scope of local government services expanded to encompass the provision of nursing homes and other forms of aged care.

During the late 1980s, and early 1990s a bi-partisan reform process led to the Local Government Act 1995, which amongst other changes, established for the first time a clear separation of responsibility between elected councillors and local government administration. Other key changes included a significant reduction in the number of decisions requiring ministerial approval which allowed for streamlined decision-making and greater local government autonomy.

Although successive state governments have periodically promoted municipal amalgamation, only a small number of local governments have merged over the course of Western Australia's history. Historically most local governments have strongly resisted forced amalgamations and the total number of authorities has declined only marginally over the last century. The most recent state government led effort to encourage the voluntary amalgamation of 30 metropolitan local governments into 16 was abandoned by the Barnett government in 2014.

In 2017, the McGowan government initiated a review process to reform the Local Government Act 1995.

== Metropolitan LGAs ==
The 30 metropolitan local government areas (LGAs) comprise 20 cities, 3 shires, and 7 towns.

Local government area	Council seat	Year est.	Land area		Population density (km²)(2022)	Population		Notes
Local government area	Council seat	Year est.	km²	sq mi	Population density (km²)(2022)	2021	2022	Notes
Armadale, City of	Armadale	1894	560	216	180	97,650	100,737	Armadale-Kelmscott until 1979
Bassendean, Town of	Bassendean	1901	10	4	1,605	16,505	16,601	West Guildford until 1922
Bayswater, City of	Morley	1897	35	14	2,084	71,796	72,145	
Belmont, City of	Cloverdale	1898	40	15	1,111	43,873	44,258	
Cambridge, Town of	Floreat	1994	22	8	1,372	29,836	30,116	Restructuring of Perth
Canning, City of	Cannington	1907	65	25	1,534	99,351	99,510	Placed under control of a Commissioner in 2012
Claremont, Town of	Claremont	1898	5	2	2,364	11,645	11,715	
Cockburn, City of	Spearwood	1871	168	65	745	122,211	125,031	Fremantle RD until 1959
Cottesloe, Town of	Cottesloe	1895	3.9	2	2,152	8,246	8,297	
East Fremantle, Town of	East Fremantle	1897	3.1	1	2,568	8,065	8,060	
Fremantle, City of	Fremantle	1871	19	7	1,748	33,109	33,711	
Gosnells, City of	Gosnells	1907	127	49	1,044	131,381	132,845	
Joondalup, City of	Joondalup	1998	99	38	1,673	165,075	165,512	Restructuring of Wanneroo
Kalamunda, City of	Kalamunda	1897	324	125	189	60,803	61,229	Governed by a Commissioner until 1961
Kwinana, City of	Kwinana Town Centre	1954	120	46	412	47,658	49,457	
Melville, City of	Booragoon	1900	53	20	2,031	106,845	107,311	
Mosman Park, Town of	Mosman Park	1899	4.3	2	2205	9,482	9,585	Split from Peppermint Grove RD. Buckland Hill RD 1899–1908, 1930–1937; Cottesloe Beach RD 1908–1930
Mundaring, Shire of	Mundaring	1903	643	248	61	40,541	40,506	Greenmount until 1932
Nedlands, City of	Nedlands	1893	20	8	1,170	22,984	22,977	Claremont RD until 1932
Peppermint Grove, Shire of	Peppermint Grove	1895	1.1	0	1,540	1,639	1,644	
Perth, City of	Perth	1856	14	5	2,211	29,667	30,364	
Rockingham, City of	Rockingham	1897	258	100	558	140,595	143,560	
Serpentine–Jarrahdale, Shire of	Mundijong	1894	901	348	39	33,346	34,770	
South Perth, City of	South Perth	1892	19.8	8	2,277	44,982	45,106	
Stirling, City of	Stirling	1871	105	41	2,252	234,380	235,845	Shire of Perth until 1971
Subiaco, City of	Subiaco	1896	5.6	2	3,198	17,914	17,967	
Swan, City of	Midland	1871	1,043	403	157	158,691	163,699	
Victoria Park, Town of	Victoria Park	1994	18	7	2,153	38,312	38,361	Restructuring of Perth
Vincent, City of	Leederville	1994	11	4	3695	37,865	38,433	Restructuring of Perth
Wanneroo, City of	Wanneroo	1902	683.3	264	323	216,450	220,932	

== Non-metropolitan LGAs ==
The 107 non-metropolitan local government areas (LGAs) comprise 7 cities, 99 shires, and 1 town.

The Shire of Christmas Island and the Shire of Cocos (Keeling) Islands are also included for comparison purposes.

Local government area	Council seat	Region	Year est.	Land area		Population		Website	Notes
Local government area	Council seat	Region	Year est.	km²	sq mi	(2021)	(2022)	Website	Notes
Albany, City of	Albany	Great Southern	1998	4,308.5	1,664	40,115	40,434	albany.wa.gov.au	Formerly: Town of Albany (1871); Shire of Albany (1871)
Ashburton, Shire of	Tom Price	Pilbara	1972	100,817	38,926	7,785	7,832	ashburton.wa.gov.au	West Pilbara until 1987. Formerly: Shire of Ashburton (1887); Shire of Tableland (1896)
Augusta Margaret River, Shire of	Margaret River	South West	1891	2,122	819	17,298	17,889	amrsc.wa.gov.au	Augusta until 1926
Beverley, Shire of	Beverley	Wheatbelt	1871	2,371	915	1,735	1,738	beverley.wa.gov.au	
Boddington, Shire of	Boddington	Peel	1903	1,905	736	1,759	1,758	boddington.wa.gov.au	Marradong until 1961
Boyup Brook, Shire of	Boyup Brook	South West	1896	2,827	1,092	1,874	1,938	boyupbrook.wa.gov.au	Upper Blackwood until 1969
Bridgetown–Greenbushes, Shire of	Bridgetown	South West	1970	1,337	516	5,376	5,527	bridgetown.wa.gov.au	Amalgamation of: Nelson RD (1887–1917), Bridgetown RD (1917–1961), Shire of Bridgetown (1961–1970); Greenbushes RD (1900–1961), Shire of Greenbushes (1961–1970)
Brookton, Shire of	Brookton	Wheatbelt	1906	1,601	618	961	955	brookton.wa.gov.au	
Broome, Shire of	Broome	Kimberley	1918	54,402	21,005	18,209	18,361	broome.wa.gov.au	
Broomehill–Tambellup, Shire of	Tambellup	Great Southern	2007	2,610	1,008	1,089	1,093	shirebt.wa.gov.au	Formerly: Shire of Broomehill (1892); Shire of Tambellup (1905)
Bruce Rock, Shire of	Bruce Rock	Wheatbelt	1913	2,725	1,052	1,016	1,019	brucerock.wa.gov.au	East Avon until 1918
Bunbury, City of	Bunbury	South West	1871	64	25	34,148	34,396	bunbury.wa.gov.au	City in 1979
Busselton, City of	Busselton	South West	1951	1,454	561	42,006	42,888	busselton.wa.gov.au	Amalgamation of Municipality and RD (both 1871); City in 2012
Capel, Shire of	Capel	South West	1894	558	215	18,780	19,021	capel.wa.gov.au	Bunbury RD until 1907
Carnamah, Shire of	Carnamah	Mid West	1923	2,871	1,108	573	572	carnamah.wa.gov.au	Split from Irwin and Mingenew
Carnarvon, Shire of	Carnarvon	Gascoyne	1911	46,675	18,021	5,526	5,531	carnarvon.wa.gov.au	Formerly: Town of Carnarvon (1891–1965); Lower Gascoyne RD (1887–1911); Minilya RD (1893–1911); Gascoyne–Minilya RD and Shire (1911–1965)
Chapman Valley, Shire of	Nabawa	Mid West	1901	3,981	1,537	1,613	1,649	chapmanvalley.wa.gov.au	Upper Chapman until 1958
Chittering, Shire of	Bindoon	Wheatbelt	1896	1,220	471	6,100	6,301	chittering.wa.gov.au	
Christmas Island, Shire of	Christmas Island	AIOT	1992	136	53	1,716	1,782	shire.gov.cx	Federal external territory.
Cocos (Keeling) Islands, Shire of	Home Island	AIOT	1992	14	5	602	614	shire.cc	Federal external territory.
Collie, Shire of	Collie	South West	1951	1,710	660	9,088	9,147	collie.wa.gov.au	Amalgamation of Municipality (1901) and RD (1900)
Coolgardie, Shire of	Coolgardie	Goldfields	1921	30,298	11,698	3,638	3,642	coolgardie.wa.gov.au	Amalgamation of Municipality (1894) and RD (1896)
Coorow, Shire of	Coorow	Mid West	1962	4,190	1,618	1,091	1,091	coorow.wa.gov.au	Split from Carnamah
Corrigin, Shire of	Corrigin	Wheatbelt	1913	2,681	1,035	1,028	1,022	corrigin.wa.gov.au	
Cranbrook, Shire of	Cranbrook	Great Southern	1926	3,276	1,265	1,137	1,141	cranbrook.wa.gov.au	
Cuballing, Shire of	Cuballing	Wheatbelt	1902	1,195	461	927	931	cuballing.wa.gov.au	
Cue, Shire of	Cue	Mid West	1912	13,582	5,244	228	230	cue.wa.gov.au	Amalgamation of Day Dawn M. (1894) and Cue RD (1895)
Cunderdin, Shire of	Cunderdin	Wheatbelt	1894	1,862	719	1,342	1,342	cunderdin.wa.gov.au	Split from Northam, named Meckering until 1944
Dalwallinu, Shire of	Dalwallinu	Wheatbelt	1916	7,224	2,789	1,436	1,429	dalwallinu.wa.gov.au	
Dandaragan, Shire of	Jurien Bay	Wheatbelt	1890	6,712	2,592	3,473	3,559	dandaragan.wa.gov.au	
Dardanup, Shire of	Eaton	South West	1894	526	203	15,199	15,373	dardanup.wa.gov.au	
Denmark, Shire of	Denmark	Great Southern	1911	1,860	718	6,467	6,534	denmark.wa.gov.au	
Derby–West Kimberley, Shire of	Derby	Kimberley	1884	119,731	46,228	8,414	8,411	sdwk.wa.gov.au	West Kimberley until 1983
Donnybrook–Balingup, Shire of	Donnybrook	South West	1970	1,560	602	6,312	6,400	donnybrook-balingup.wa.gov.au	Formerly: Shire of Donnybrook, Preston RD until 1961 (1896); Shire of Balingup, Upper Capel RD until 1905 (1899)
Dowerin, Shire of	Dowerin	Wheatbelt	1911	1,863	719	733	732	dowerin.wa.gov.au	
Dumbleyung, Shire of	Dumbleyung	Wheatbelt	1909	2,539	980	699	693	dumbleyung.wa.gov.au]	
Dundas, Shire of	Norseman	Goldfields	1929	92,886	35,863	699	697	dundas.wa.gov.au	
East Pilbara, Shire of	Newman	Pilbara	1972	372,296	143,744	10,377	10,307	eastpilbara.wa.gov.au	Formerly: Shire of Marble Bar (1896); Shire of Nullagine (1898)
Esperance, Shire of	Esperance	Goldfields	1895	44,798	17,297	14,398	14,500	esperance.wa.gov.au	Absorbed municipality (1895–1908)
Exmouth, Shire of	Exmouth	Gascoyne	1964	6,488	2,505	3,205	3,313	exmouth.wa.gov.au	
Gingin, Shire of	Gingin	Wheatbelt	1893	3,208	1,239	5,751	5,892	gingin.wa.gov.au	Absorbed municipality (1893–1903)
Gnowangerup, Shire of	Gnowangerup	Great Southern	1912	4,265	1,647	1,260	1,262	gnowangerup.wa.gov.au	
Goomalling, Shire of	Goomalling	Wheatbelt	1927	1,835	708	985	985	goomalling.wa.gov.au	
Greater Geraldton, City of	Geraldton	Mid West	2011	9,909	3,826	41,198	41,514	cgg.wa.gov.au	Formerly: City of Geraldton (1871–2007); Shire of Greenough (1951–2007); Shire of Mullewa (1911–2011)
Halls Creek, Shire of	Halls Creek	Kimberley	1887	133,046	51,369	4,041	4,102	hcshire.wa.gov.au	Kimberley Goldfields until 1915
Harvey, Shire of	Harvey	South West	1894	1,728	667	29,631	30,141	harvey.wa.gov.au	
Irwin, Shire of	Dongara	Mid West	1871	2,369	915	3,771	3,795	irwin.wa.gov.au	
Jerramungup, Shire of	Jerramungup	Great Southern	1982	6,511	2,514	1,196	1,196	jerramungup.wa.gov.au	Split from Gnowangerup
Kalgoorlie–Boulder, City of	Kalgoorlie	Goldfields	1989	95,500	36,873	30,674	30,697	kalbould.wa.gov.au	Formerly: Town of Kalgoorlie (1897–1989); Shire of Boulder (1969–1989)
Karratha, City of	Karratha	Pilbara	1887	15,238	5,883	23,421	23,778	karratha.wa.gov.au	Absorbed Roebourne and Cossack municipalities in 1910, was known as Shire of Roebourne until 2014
Katanning, Shire of	Katanning	Great Southern	1892	1,518	586	4,226	4,233	katanning.wa.gov.au	
Kellerberrin, Shire of	Kellerberrin	Wheatbelt	1908	1,915	739	1,178	1,178	kellerberrin.wa.gov.au	
Kent, Shire of	Nyabing	Great Southern	1922	5,625	2,172	506	506	kent.wa.gov.au	Nyabing–Pingrup 1955–1972
Kojonup, Shire of	Kojonup	Great Southern	1871	2,931	1,132	1,965	1,972	kojonup.wa.gov.au	
Kondinin, Shire of	Kondinin	Wheatbelt	1925	7,441	2,873	872	866	kondinin.wa.gov.au	
Koorda, Shire of	Koorda	Wheatbelt	1927	2,832	1,093	373	373	koorda.wa.gov.au	
Kulin, Shire of	Kulin	Wheatbelt	1918	4,719	1,822	791	784	kulin.wa.gov.au	Roe until 1926
Lake Grace, Shire of	Lake Grace	Wheatbelt	1922	11,886	4,589	1,300	1,290	lakegrace.wa.gov.au	
Laverton, Shire of	Laverton	Goldfields	1906	179,994	69,496	1,432	1,433	laverton.wa.gov.au	Mount Margaret until 1950, absorbed Mount Morgans M (1900–1913)
Leonora, Shire of	Leonora	Goldfields	1912	31,915	12,322	1,717	1,720	leonora.wa.gov.au	
Mandurah, City of	Mandurah	Peel	1949	175	68	93,414	95,509	mandurah.wa.gov.au	City in 1990
Manjimup, Shire of	Manjimup	South West	1908	7,030	2,714	9,351	9,416	manjimup.wa.gov.au	Warren until 1925
Meekatharra, Shire of	Meekatharra	Mid West	1909	100,189	38,683	1,287	1,293	meekashire.wa.gov.au	
Menzies, Shire of	Menzies	Goldfields	1912	124,115	47,921	569	570	menzies.wa.gov.au	
Merredin, Shire of	Merredin	Wheatbelt	1921	3,294	1,272	3,221	3,228	merredin.wa.gov.au	
Mingenew, Shire of	Mingenew	Mid West	1901	1,935	747	423	423	mingenew.wa.gov.au	Upper Irwin until 1919
Moora, Shire of	Moora	Wheatbelt	1908	3,763	1,453	2,384	2,371	moora.wa.gov.au	Split from Victoria Plains
Morawa, Shire of	Morawa	Mid West	1928	3,511	1,356	669	668	morawa.wa.gov.au	Split from Perenjori–Morawa RD
Mount Magnet, Shire of	Mount Magnet	Mid West	1901	13,858	5,351	698	701	mtmagnet.wa.gov.au	Absorbed municipality (1896–1901)
Mount Marshall, Shire of	Bencubbin	Wheatbelt	1923	10,185	3,932	467	463	mtmarshall.wa.gov.au	
Mukinbudin, Shire of	Mukinbudin	Wheatbelt	1933	3,427	1,323	593	587	mukinbudin.wa.gov.au	
Murchison, Shire of	Murchison	Mid West	1875	45,046	17,392	108	108	murchison.wa.gov.au	
Murray, Shire of	Pinjarra	Peel	1887	1,706	659	18,641	19,104	murray.wa.gov.au	
Nannup, Shire of	Nannup	South West	1890	3,054	1,179	1,574	1,586	nannup.wa.gov.au	Lower Blackwood until 1925
Narembeen, Shire of	Narembeen	Wheatbelt	1925	3,809	1,471	820	821	narembeen.wa.gov.au	
Narrogin, Shire of	Narrogin	Wheatbelt	1892	1,631	630	4,937	4,953	narrogin.wa.gov.au	Absorbed Town of Narrogin (1906–2016)
Ngaanyatjarraku, Shire of	Warburton	Goldfields	1993	159,816	61,705	1,476	1,478	ngaanyatjarraku.wa.gov.au	
Northam, Shire of	Northam	Wheatbelt	1871	1,431	553	11,810	11,940	northam.wa.gov.au	Absorbed Town of Northam (1879–2007)
Northampton, Shire of	Northampton	Mid West	1871	12,544	4,843	3,335	3,332	northampton.wa.gov.au	Mines RD until 1887
Nungarin, Shire of	Nungarin	Wheatbelt	1921	1,166	450	263	261	nungarin.wa.gov.au	
Perenjori, Shire of	Perenjori	Mid West	1916	8,301	3,205	652	651	perenjori.wa.gov.au	Perenjori–Morawa until 1928
Pingelly, Shire of	Pingelly	Wheatbelt	1891	1,295	500	1,072	1,067	pingelly.wa.gov.au	Moorumbine until 1913
Plantagenet, Shire of	Mount Barker	Great Southern	1871	4,877	1,883	5,534	5,590	plantagenet.wa.gov.au	
Port Hedland, Town of	Port Hedland	Pilbara	1891	18,417	7,111	16,660	16,987	porthedland.wa.gov.au	Pilbara until 1904. Town 1989
Quairading, Shire of	Quairading	Wheatbelt	1913	2,017	779	982	983	quairading.wa.gov.au	Avon until 1922
Ravensthorpe, Shire of	Ravensthorpe	Great Southern	1900	9,842	3,800	2,157	2,190	ravensthorpe.wa.gov.au	Phillips River until 1961
Sandstone, Shire of	Sandstone	Mid West	1897	32,605	12,589	117	117	sandstone.wa.gov.au	Black Range until 1961
Shark Bay, Shire of	Denham	Gascoyne	1904	24,201	9,344	1,069	1,076	sharkbay.wa.gov.au	
Tammin, Shire of	Tammin	Wheatbelt	1948	1,102	425	401	402	tammin.wa.gov.au	Split from Cunderdin
Three Springs, Shire of	Three Springs	Mid West	1928	2,657	1,026	587	587	threesprings.wa.gov.au	
Toodyay, Shire of	Toodyay	Wheatbelt	1912	1,692	653	4,713	4,812	toodyay.wa.gov.au	Amalgamation of Newcastle M (1877) and Toodyay RD (1871)
Trayning, Shire of	Trayning	Wheatbelt	1911	1,651	637	307	304	trayning.wa.gov.au	
Upper Gascoyne, Shire of	Gascoyne Junction	Gascoyne	1887	57,810	22,321	180	187	uppergascoyne.wa.gov.au	
Victoria Plains, Shire of	Calingiri	Wheatbelt	1871	2,551	985	832	827	victoriaplains.wa.gov.au	
Wagin, Shire of	Wagin	Wheatbelt	1887	1,946	751	1,802	1,811	wagin.wa.gov.au	Arthur until 1905. Absorbed municipality (1906–1961)
Wandering, Shire of	Wandering	Wheatbelt	1874	1,904	735	551	548	wandering.wa.gov.au	
Waroona, Shire of	Waroona	Peel	1898	832	321	4,357	4,405	waroona.wa.gov.au	Drakesbrook until 1961
West Arthur, Shire of	Darkan	Wheatbelt	1896	2,832	1,093	795	799	westarthur.wa.gov.au	
Westonia, Shire of	Westonia	Wheatbelt	1916	3,319	1,281	255	252	westonia.wa.gov.au	
Wickepin, Shire of	Wickepin	Wheatbelt	1909	2,041	788	712	706	wickepin.wa.gov.au	
Williams, Shire of	Williams	Wheatbelt	1871	2,305	890	1,050	1,055	williams.wa.gov.au	
Wiluna, Shire of	Wiluna	Goldfields	1909	181,297	69,999	570	572	wiluna.wa.gov.au	
Wongan–Ballidu, Shire of	Wongan Hills	Wheatbelt	1887	3,365	1,299	1,338	1,339	wongan.wa.gov.au	Melbourne until 1926
Woodanilling, Shire of	Woodanilling	Great Southern	1906	1,129	436	468	469	woodanilling.wa.gov.au	
Wyalkatchem, Shire of	Wyalkatchem	Wheatbelt	1920	1,595	616	484	484	wyalkatchem.wa.gov.au	
Wyndham East Kimberley, Shire of	Kununurra	Kimberley	1887	112,066	43,269	8,053	8,058	swek.wa.gov.au	East Kimberley until 1896, Wyndham until 1961
Yalgoo, Shire of	Yalgoo	Mid West	1907	27,950	10,792	364	365	yalgoo.wa.gov.au	Upper Murchison until 1912
Yilgarn, Shire of	Southern Cross	Wheatbelt	1891	30,429	11,749	1,206	1,196	yilgarn.wa.gov.au	Absorbed Southern Cross M (1892–1918)
York, Shire of	York	Wheatbelt	1871	2,132	823	3,553	3,565	york.wa.gov.au	Absorbed Town of York (1871–1965)

== Regional councils ==
Currently, Western Australia has ten regional councils. Each regional council comprises two or more local government areas (LGAs).

=== Metropolitan regional councils ===
- Eastern Metropolitan Regional Council – 6 LGAs (4 cities, 1 shire, and 1 town)
  - City of Bayswater
  - City of Belmont
  - City of Kalamunda
  - City of Swan
  - Shire of Mundaring
  - Town of Bassendean
- Mindarie Regional Council – 7 LGAs (5 cities and 2 towns)
  - City of Joondalup
  - City of Perth
  - City of Stirling
  - City of Vincent
  - City of Wanneroo
  - Town of Cambridge
  - Town of Victoria Park
- Rivers Regional Council – 6 LGAs (4 cities and 2 shires)
  - City of Armadale
  - City of Gosnells
  - City of Mandurah
  - City of South Perth
  - Shire of Murray
  - Shire of Serpentine-Jarrahdale
- Southern Metropolitan Regional Council – 5 LGAs (4 cities and 1 town)
  - City of Cockburn
  - City of Fremantle
  - City of Kwinana
  - City of Melville
  - Town of East Fremantle
- Tamala Park Regional Council – 7 LGAs (5 cities and 2 towns)
  - City of Joondalup
  - City of Perth
  - City of Stirling
  - City of Vincent
  - City of Wanneroo
  - Town of Cambridge
  - Town of Victoria Park
- Western Metropolitan Regional Council – 5 LGAs (1 city, 1 shire, and 3 towns)
  - City of Subiaco
  - Shire of Peppermint Grove
  - Town of Claremont
  - Town of Cottesloe
  - Town of Mosman Park

=== Non-metropolitan regional councils ===
- Bunbury Harvey Regional Council – 2 LGAs (1 city and 1 shire)
  - City of Bunbury
  - Shire of Harvey
- Murchison Regional Vermin Council – 5 LGAs (5 shires)
  - Shire of Cue
  - Shire of Meekatharra
  - Shire of Mount Magnet
  - Shire of Sandstone
  - Shire of Yalgoo
- Pilbara Regional Council – 4 LGAs (1 city, 2 shires, and 1 town)
  - City of Karratha
  - Shire of Ashburton
  - Shire of East Pilbara
  - Town of Port Hedland
- Warren Blackwood Alliance of Councils – 5 LGAs (5 shires)
  - Shire of Boyup Brook
  - Shire of Bridgetown–Greenbushes
  - Shire of Donnybrook–Balingup
  - Shire of Manjimup
  - Shire of Nannup
