= Shire of Three Springs =

Coordinates: 29°31′59″S 115°42′53″E

- Local government area
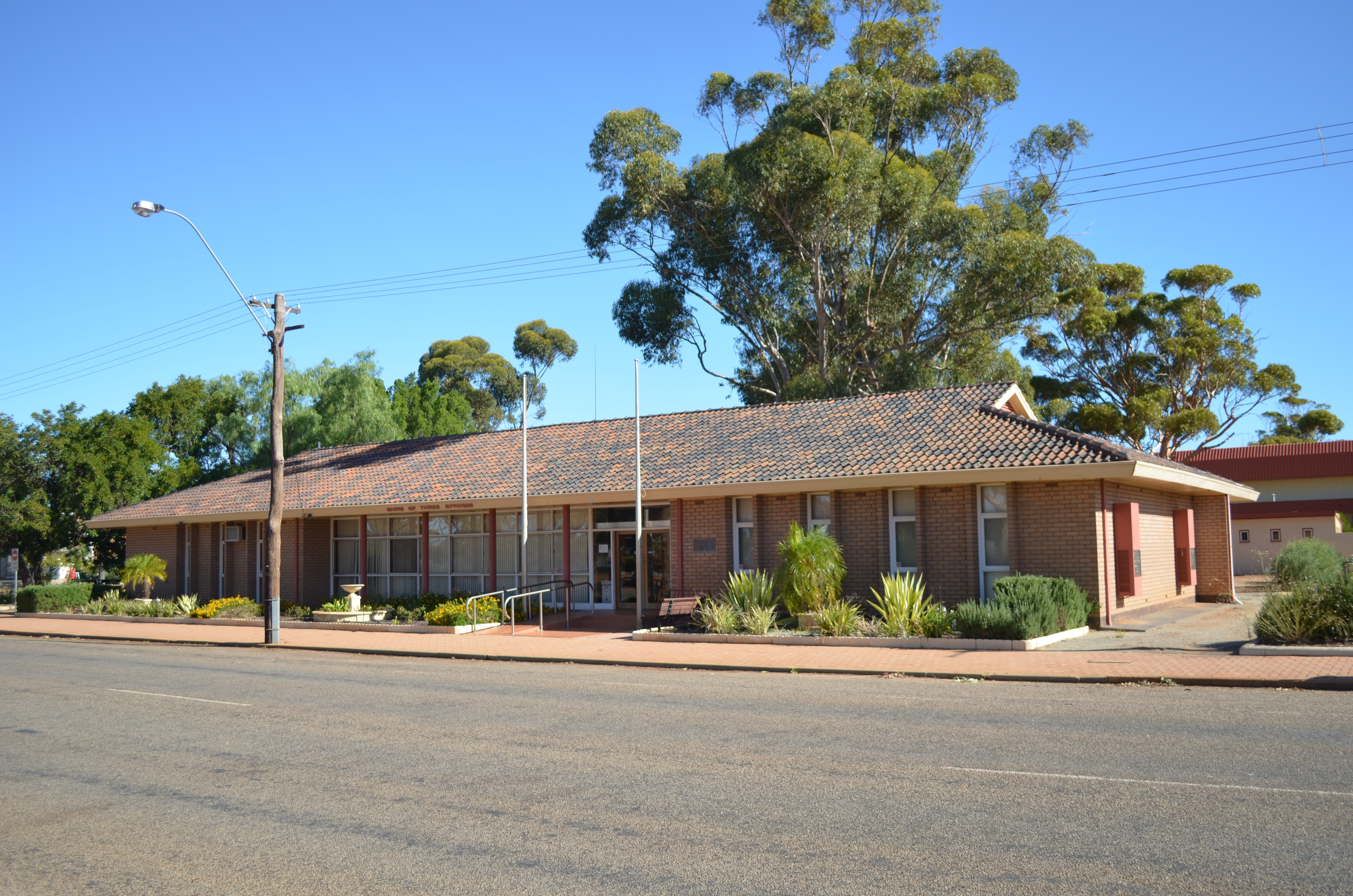
- Three Springs shire office, 2013
- Interactive map of Shire of Three Springs
- Country: Australia
- State: Western Australia
- Region: Mid West
- Council seat: Three Springs

Government
  - Shire President: Chris Lane
  - State electorate: Moore
  - Federal division: Durack

Area
  - Total: 2,657.4 km^{2} (1,026.0 sq mi)

Population
  - Total: 575 (LGA 2021)
- Website: Shire of Three Springs
LGAs around Shire of Three Springs
Irwin	Mingenew	Morawa
Irwin	Shire of Three Springs	Perenjori
Carnamah	Carnamah	Carnamah

The Shire of Three Springs is a local government area in the Mid West region of Western Australia, about 310 kilometres (193 mi) north of the state capital Perth. The Shire covers an area of 2,657 square kilometres (1,026 sq mi), and its seat of government is the town of Three Springs.

== History ==
The Three Springs Road District was constituted on 2 November 1928 from parts of the neighbouring road districts of Mingenew, Perenjori and Carnamah. It held its first meeting on 2 February 1929, with E. Hunt as its first chairman. On 1 July 1961, it became a shire under the Local Government Act 1960, which reformed all remaining road districts into shires.

On 18 September 2009, the Shires of Mingenew, Three Springs, Morawa and Perenjori announced their intention to amalgamate. A formal agreement was signed five days later, and the name Billeranga was later chosen.

However, by February 2011, community pressure had led to the negotiations stalling, and on 16 April 2011, voters from the Shire of Perenjori defeated the proposal at a referendum.

== Wards ==
The Shire is no longer divided into wards. The seven councillors represent all electors.

== Towns and localities ==
The towns and localities of the Shire of Three Springs with population and size figures based on the most recent Australian census:

Locality	Population	Area	Map
Arrino	48 (SAL 2021)	399.4 km^{2} (154.2 sq mi)	
Arrowsmith East	61 (SAL 2021)	812.2 km^{2} (313.6 sq mi)	
Dudawa	34 (SAL 2021)	356.7 km^{2} (137.7 sq mi)	
Kadathinni	36 (SAL 2021)	707.3 km^{2} (273.1 sq mi)	
Three Springs	356 (SAL 2021)	1.2 km^{2} (0.46 sq mi)	
Womarden	32 (SAL 2021)	380.4 km^{2} (146.9 sq mi)	

== Population ==
Historical population

Year	Pop.	±% p.a.
1933	879	—
1947	730	−1.32%
1954	972	+4.17%
1961	1,018	+0.66%
1966	1,038	+0.39%
1971	1,011	−0.53%
1976	1,064	+1.03%
1981	1,081	+0.32%

Year	Pop.	±% p.a.
1986	1,022	−1.12%
1991	820	−4.31%
1996	806	−0.34%
2001	732	−1.91%
2006	664	−1.93%
2011	616	−1.49%
2016	594	−0.72%
2021	575	−0.65%

== Heritage-listed places ==
As of 2023, 47 places are heritage-listed in the Shire of Three Springs, of which one is on the State Register of Heritage Places, the former Duffy's Store & Billiard Saloon. The store, dating back to 1929, was added to the register on 24 March 2005.
