= Mid West (Western Australia) =

- Region
- Interactive map of Mid West
- Coordinates: 28°S 114°E
- Country: Australia
- State: Western Australia
- LGA: Carnamah; Chapman Valley; Coorow; Cue; Greater Geraldton; Irwin; Meekatharra; Mingenew; Morawa; Mount Magnet; Murchison; Northampton; Perenjori; Sandstone; Three Springs; Yalgoo

Government
  - State electorates: Geraldton; Mid-West
  - Federal division: Durack

Area
  - Total: 472,336 km^{2} (182,370 sq mi)

Population
  - Total: 52,000 (2006 census)
  - Density: 0.1101/km^{2} (0.2851/sq mi)
- Time zone: UTC+8 (WST)
Regions around Mid West
| Gascoyne | Pilbara | Pilbara |
| Indian Ocean | Mid West | Goldfields-Esperance |
| Indian Ocean | Wheatbelt | Goldfields-Esperance |

The Mid West region is one of the nine regions of Western Australia. It is a sparsely populated region extending from the west coast of Western Australia, about 200 kilometres (120 mi) north and south of its administrative centre of Geraldton and inland to 450 kilometres (280 mi) east of Wiluna in the Gibson Desert.

It has a total area of 285,497 square kilometres (110,231 sq mi), and a permanent population of about 54,000 people, more than half of those in Geraldton.

== Earlier names ==
The western portion of this region was known earlier as "the Murchison" based on the river of the same name, and the similarly named goldfield.

== Economy ==
The Mid West region has a diversified economy that varies with the geography and climate. Near the coast, annual rainfall of between 400 and 500 millimetres (16 and 20 in) allows intensive agriculture. Further inland, annual rainfall decreases to less than 250 millimetres (10 in), and here the economy is dominated by mining of iron ore, gold, nickel and other mineral resources. Geraldton is an important hub for the tourism industry. The Mid West also has the highest value fishing industry in Western Australia, with Geraldton the hub of the Western Rock Lobster industry. Western Rock Lobster netted almost $234.5 million in revenue for WA in the 2012–13 financial year, making it Australia's most valuable single-species wild capture fishery.

Gross Regional Product for the Mid West in 2013 was AU$6,000,000,000 (AU$6bn).

On 25 August 2015 The Hon. Terry Redman, MLA, Minister for Regional Development, launched the "Mid West Regional Blueprint"; an aspirational growth and development plan created by the Mid West Development Commission for the region. The Blueprint proposes strategies against five priority pillars to drive or reduce barriers to, regional growth and development in the Mid West. The Blueprint strategies are intended to focus on the region's key strengths and the identification of regional opportunities, providing a guide for regional development to 2050.

== Space science ==
=== Square Kilometre Array ===
Due to its relative isolation from radio-frequency interference, the Mid West region was selected to host one of two primary radiotelescope locations of the Square Kilometre Array (SKA) project. When fully operational in 2024, this AU$2bn project will be 50 times more sensitive than any existing radio interferometer instrument; it will generate more data than the current global Internet traffic and be capable of surveying the sky more than ten thousand to a million times faster than what is possible today. The radiotelescope antennae and the Murchison Radio-astronomy Observatory (MRO) are located near Boolardy, Western Australia, approximately 315 km northeast of Geraldton, with logistics and science support provided by CSIRO from their facilities in Geraldton. High-capacity optical fibre cables connect the SKA telescope to the MRO support facility in Geraldton and to the Pawsley Supercomputing Centre in Perth, Western Australia.

=== WA Space Centre ===
Located at Yatharagga, 40 km from Mingenew (100 km SE of Geraldton), the WA Space Centre is an $8,000,000 114 ha satellite park owned and operated by Space Australia, a subsidiary company of the Swedish Space Corporation (SSC). The park is located in one of several Radio Quiet Zones in the region, making it an ideal location for radioastronomy. The SSC is the largest commercial operator of satellite tracking ground station facilities. The facilities include compounds operated by NASA, The European Space Agency, CSIRO, MOBLAS and VLBI, amongst others.

== Local government ==
The local government areas in the Mid West region are Carnamah, Chapman Valley, Coorow, Cue, Greater Geraldton, Irwin, Meekatharra, Mingenew, Morawa, Mount Magnet, Murchison, Northampton, Perenjori, Sandstone, Three Springs and Yalgoo. On 1 June 2021 Shire of Wiluna officially joined Goldfields-Esperance region.

== Transport ==
Geraldton is the regional hub, having road and railway facilities leading to the port.

Formerly Geraldton was connected by a private railway to Perth, and the government railway system connected via Mullewa.

== Conservation reserves ==
In February 2021, the creation of five new conservation parks within the traditional lands of the Badimia people in the Mount Magnet area, covering over 114,000 ha (280,000 acres), was announced by the Government of Western Australia, to be jointly managed between the traditional owners and the Department of Biodiversity, Conservation and Attractions' Parks and Wildlife Service. The allocated land includes portions of two former pastoral leases, Lakeside and Burnerbinmah, as well as Crown land at Kirkalocka and White Wells. There are many significant Aboriginal sites of significance as well as other historic sites within the new parks.

== See also ==
- Regions of Western Australia
