= Painsthorpe Abbey =

Anglican monastery

Coordinates: 54.015°N 0.761°W

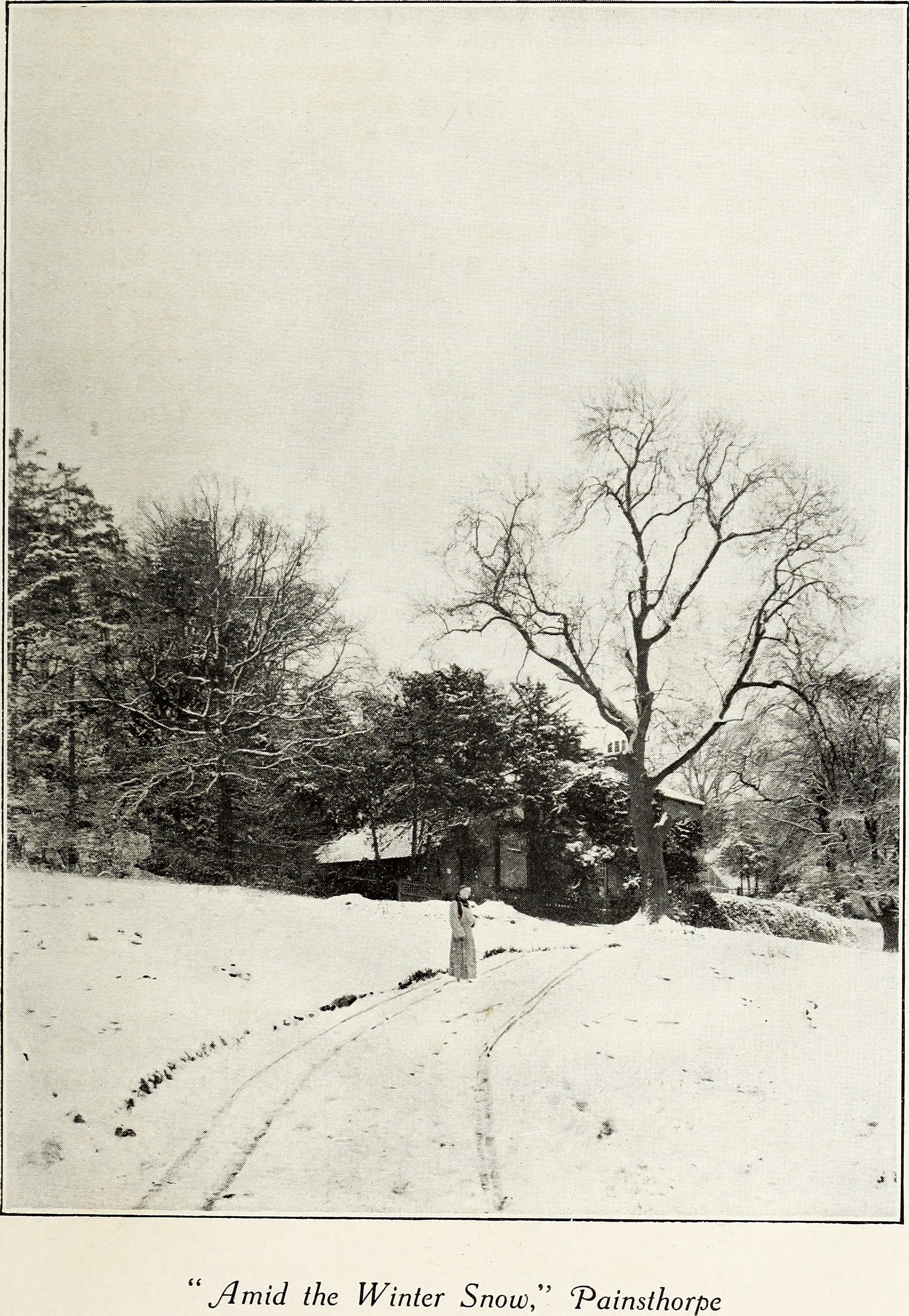
A monk in front of Painsthorpe Hall

Painsthorpe Abbey was a short-lived monastery of the Anglican Order of St. Benedict. It was established in 1902 at Painsthorpe in the East Riding of Yorkshire by Aelred Carlyle, a friend of Charles Chapman Grafton, Episcopal Bishop of Fond du Lac and an inspiration for Alfred Hope Patten. In 1906 the monks left Yorkshire for Caldey Abbey in Wales. A brick chapel had been added to Painsthorpe Hall which served as the monastery.
