= Pembroke Deanery =

The Pembroke Deanery is a Roman Catholic deanery in the Archdiocese of Cardiff-Menevia, previously in the Diocese of Menevia, Swansea, Wales that covers several churches in Pembrokeshire and the surrounding area. In the early 2010s, the Aberystwyth Deanery was dissolved and its churches in Ceredigion were distributed to the surrounding deaneries. The churches in the north, such as those in Aberystwyth, became part of the Llandrindod Wells Deanery, Lampeter went to the Carmarthen Deanery and the western churches, such as those in Cardigan, became part of the Pembroke Deanery.

The current dean is V.Rev Liam Bradley; Lead Chaplain of Dyfed-Powys Constabulary and Chaplain to the Sisters of Holy Cross Abbey, Whitland.

== Churches ==
- Abbey of Our Lady and St Samson, Caldey Island
- Our Lady of the Taper, Cardigan
- Our Lady Queen of Peace, Newcastle Emlyn - served from Cardigan
- Holy Name, Fishguard
- St Michael, St Davids - served from Fishguard
- St David and St Patrick, Haverfordwest
- Immaculate Conception, Narberth - served from Haverfordwest
- St Francis of Assisi, Milford Haven
- Holyrood and St Teilo Church, Tenby
- St Bride, Saundersfoot - served from Tenby
- Holy Cross Abbey, Whitland

== Gallery ==
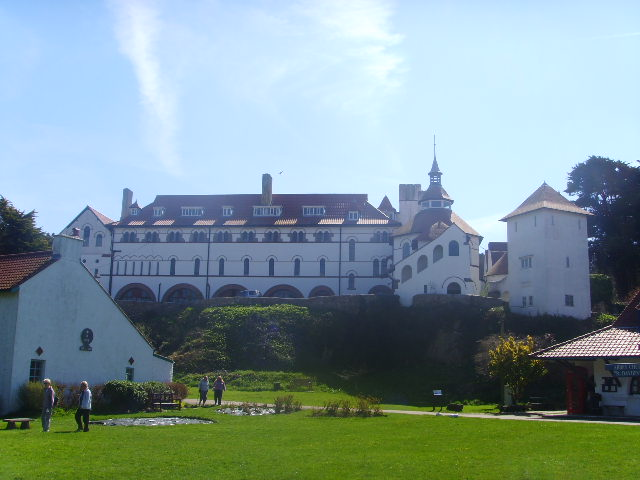
Caldey Abbey

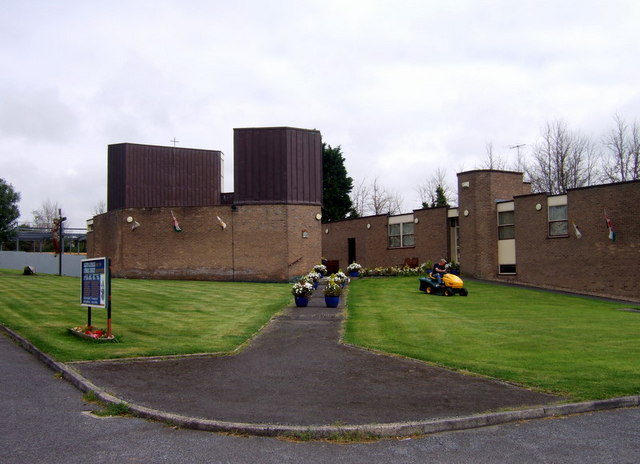
Our Lady of the Taper Shrine and Church, Cardigan

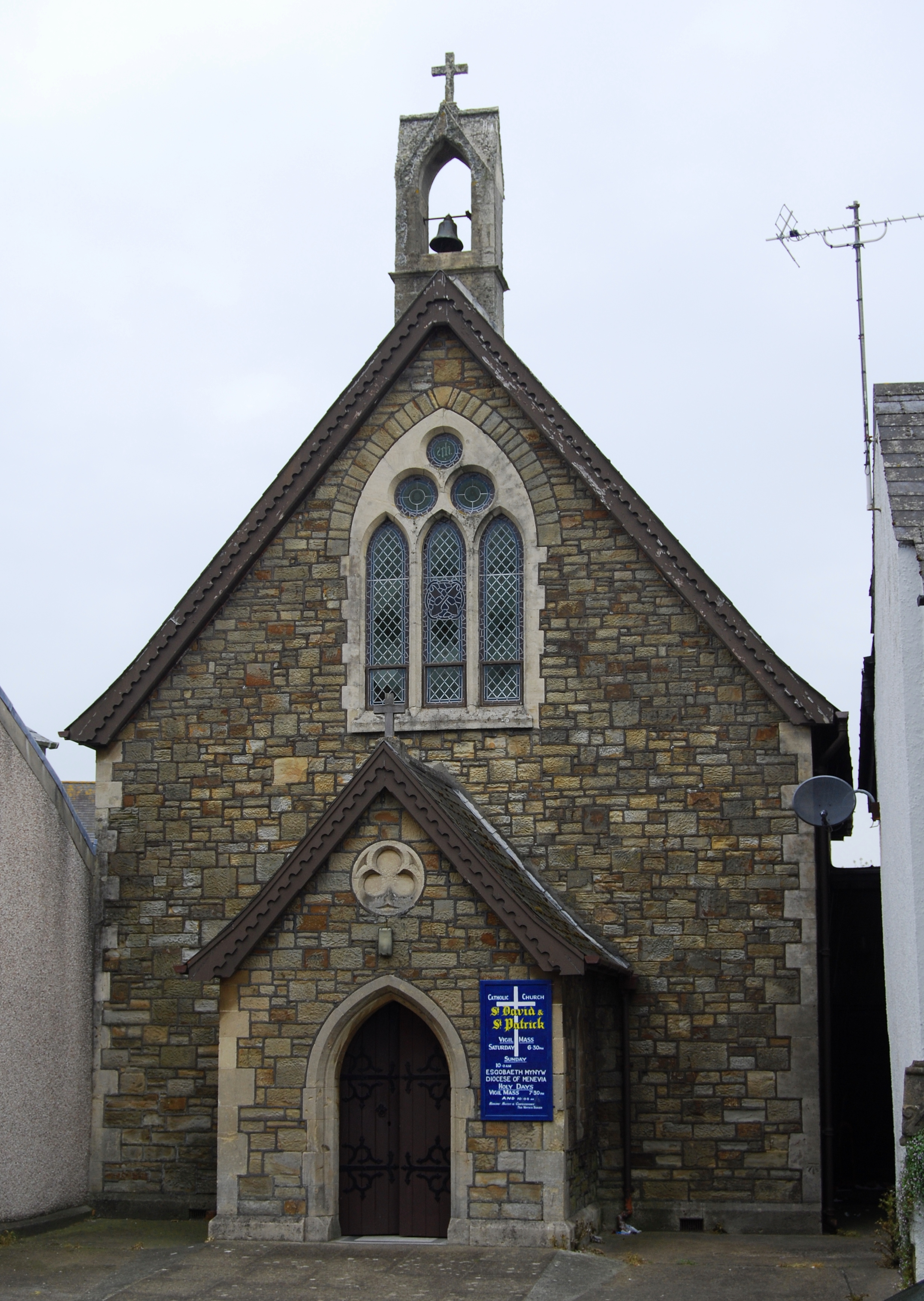
St David and St Patrick Church, Haverfordwest

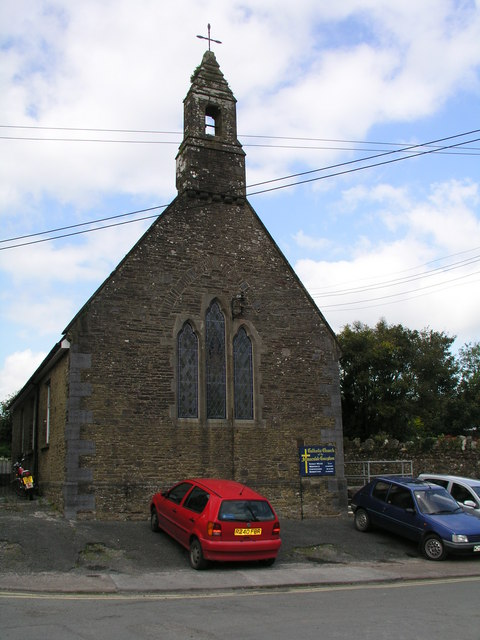
Immaculate Conception, Narberth

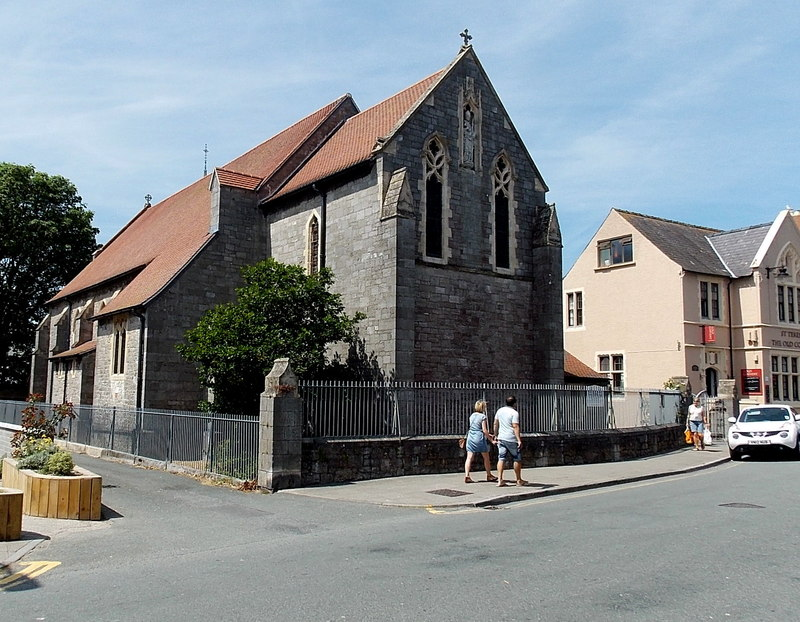
Holyrood and St Teilo, Tenby

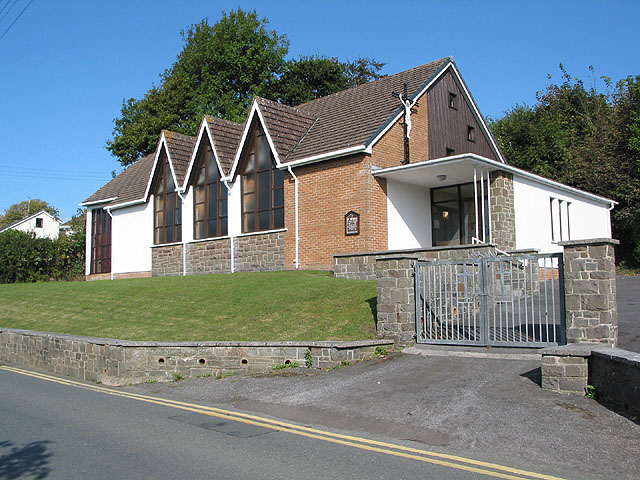
St Bride, Saundersfoot

St Francis of Assisi, Milford Haven
