= COVID-19 pandemic in Gibraltar =

Ongoing COVID-19 viral pandemic in Gibraltar

- Disease: COVID-19
- Pathogen: SARS-CoV-2
- Location: Gibraltar
- Arrival date: 4 March 2020 (6 years, 5 months and 4 days)
- Confirmed cases: 20,550
- Recovered: 20,307
- Deaths: 113
- Fatality rate: 0.54%

Government website
- Gibraltar Health Authority

The COVID-19 pandemic was confirmed to have spread to the British Overseas Territory of Gibraltar in March 2020. The first death in Gibraltar occurred on 11 November 2020. As of 18 March 2021, there are 4,270 confirmed cases, 4,146 recoveries, and 94 deaths. As of April 2021, Gibraltar is the first territory where enough of the population has been vaccinated to achieve herd immunity.

== Background ==
On 12 January 2020, the World Health Organization (WHO) confirmed that a novel coronavirus was the cause of a respiratory illness in a cluster of people in Wuhan City, Hubei Province, China, which was reported to the WHO on 31 December 2019.

The case fatality ratio for COVID-19 has been much lower than SARS of 2003, but the transmission has been significantly greater, with a significant total death toll. From 19 March 2021, Public Health England no longer classified COVID-19 as a "High consequence infectious disease".

== Timeline ==
=== March to June 2020 ===
On 4 March, the first case was confirmed. The infected was a person who had travelled from Northern Italy via Málaga Airport. The patient was in self-isolation. On 7 March, the patient was tested negative and was allowed to end the self-isolation. At this point, in Gibraltar a further 63 persons were in self-isolation.

Total social lockdown began on 24 March, with certain exceptions for essential workers and businesses, over 70's having already entered lockdown.

As of 27 March, 42 people had tested positive for COVID-19 in Gibraltar, including two workers from the Elderly Residential Services at Mount Alvernia.

At the end of March, a Florence Nightingale Field Hospital with 192 beds was completed on the Europa Point Sports Complex.

In April, the general lockdown was extended to 22 May, Gibraltar having on 23 April four active cases with 129 people having recovered. Over 2,000 tests having been carried out.

On 9 May, the border with Spain was opened to Spanish residents who held non-essential employment contracts in Gibraltar to allow them to return to work. Many businesses in Gibraltar having been allowed to reopen from 4 May.

By 14 May, 147 cases were registered but with 144 recovered and no deaths.

As of 1 June, there were 12 active cases in Gibraltar with a further seven cross-border workers living in Spain also testing positive. 7,644 swabs had been undertaken, those confirmed positive were 170, with 19 active and 151 recovered. As of 22 June there were no active cases, 176 cases had recovered and 11,129 tests had been carried out. An active case was located on 27 June.

A contact app called "BEAT Covid Gibraltar" was released on 18 June available through both Apple and Google with the objective to reduce transmission of COVID-19 by informing users that they had been close to someone who had tested positive. Alerts are sent for close contact of another app user who has been within 2 metres of an infected person for 15 minutes or more.

=== July to September 2020 ===
As of 17 August, there were 19 active cases (17 residents, 2 visitors), 217 confirmed cases and 194 recovered. 215 were currently in isolation, 27,458 tests had been undertaken.

By 2 September there were 42 active cases (42 residents, 0 visitors) with 295 confirmed cases and 240 recovered. 206 were in isolation and 35,256 tests had been undertaken. From 8 September a ban on gatherings of over 20 people in most circumstances was introduced with a fine of £100 applicable, although this can escalate to £10,000 with 3 months on prison. As of 20 September, there were 21 active cases (21 residents, 0 visitors) with 350 confirmed cases and 323 recovered. 172 were in isolation and 42,458 tests had been undertaken.

=== October to December 2020 ===
With increasing numbers of positive tests giving concern and to avoid another lockdown, the government announced it would increase capacity for tests to 1,000 per day with a saliva test for school users and workers every 2 weeks. Elderly Resident Services placed in lockdown, from 23 October groups will be reduced to 16, in restaurants a limit of 8 per table, less tables and last orders 11pm, in bars last orders 9pm and close at 10pm, strongly recommended to wear masks in public areas. Cases passed 500 in mid October.

The first death was recorded on 11 November, the second on 17 November, the third on 19 November, all three in Gibraltar's Elderly Residential Service. The fourth death was in his 60's and the fifth in his 40's, both with underlying health problems. Cases passed 1,000 in late November.

The sixth death from COVID-19, of a man aged 65–70, was recorded on 13 December, the increase in cases causing a 7pm curfew for bars and restaurants starting from 18 December. Cases doubled, passing 2,000 in December as a curfew was announced between 10pm and 6am as well as the closure of all non essential shops, including hairdressers and beauty salons until 10 January.

=== January to October 2021 ===
With new cases averaging over 100 per day and a second Critical Care Unit being opened, a full lockdown was put in place, to last 14 days, residents were not allowed to leave home except for work, exercise, essentials, or medical reasons. Vaccinations started on 10 January with frontline hospital staff first in line.

On 18 January, it was reported that deaths had reached 45 and there were 681 active cases. However 5,847 vaccine doses had been administered, corresponding to 17.3% of the population. By 26 January 11,073 had been vaccinated, corresponding to 33.8% of the population. On 29 January the Government of Gibraltar announced that Phase 1 of the vaccination program was complete, with over 12,800 (37.9%) vaccinated. Phase 2 started on 31 January, following receipt of additional vaccine on 30 January, and provided second doses for those most at risk and then first doses for any over high risk people or priority workers who have not had one.

On 2 February, the government confirmed the 79th death from the disease. Also on 2 February, the Gibraltar Health Authority announced a hotline for students studying abroad, notably in the UK, to register for vaccination. The public health goal was to avoid those students transmitting the virus to older, more susceptible, relatives on return.

On 18 March, UK Secretary of State for Health and Social Care Matt Hancock announced that Gibraltar had completed vaccinating its entire adult population against COVID-19. As a result, Gibraltar became the first area in the world to do so. According to CNN, over 90% of adults had at least one vaccine dose by 1 April while Medical Xpress stated that 85% of adults in Gibraltar were "fully inoculated" by 9 April. Additionally, most of the Spaniards who work in the territory have been vaccinated. In response, Gibraltar revoked most measures put in place during the pandemic, most notably ending mandatory mask-wearing in outdoor spaces. As of 4 May, the territory had not had a new local case in six weeks.

However, cases spiked again in July, with a peak of 361 cases. The surge was blamed on the Delta variant. In response, the government reimposed restrictions on gatherings again, with large events being cancelled and attendees at small events required to provide proof of vaccination and a negative test. During the summer of 2021, cases remained relatively low and booster shots began to be administered to vulnerable groups. A community outbreak in October that lead to an increase from 54 to 198 cases in the month prompted the government to express warnings about public gatherings, but hospitalisation remains low. Vaccination of 12–15 year olds also started in late October, ahead of the planned mid-term break rollout due to the early arrival of Pfizer jabs.

== See also ==
- COVID-19 pandemic by country and territory
- COVID-19 pandemic in Europe
