= List of State Register of Heritage Places in the Shire of Yalgoo =

List of heritage sites in Western Australia

The State Register of Heritage Places is maintained by the Heritage Council of Western Australia. As of 2026, 44 places are heritage-listed in the Shire of Yalgoo, of which eleven are on the State Register of Heritage Places.

== List ==
The Western Australian State Register of Heritage Places, as of 2026, lists the following eleven state registered places within the Shire of Yalgoo:

Place name	Place #	Street number	Street name	Suburb or town	Co-ordinates	Notes & former names	Photo
Yalgoo Justice Precinct	2770	3	Museum Court	Yalgoo	28.341408°S 116.681782°E	Museum (Court House & Gaol former), Yalgoo Court House and Gaol	
Dominican Convent Chapel of St Hyacinth (former)	2776		Henty Street	Yalgoo	28.33929°S 116.677653°E		
Yalgoo Railway Station Group	2778	28	Piesse Street	Yalgoo	28.34675°S 116.682056°E		
Melangata	2785		Melangata Road	Melangata	27.803456°S 116.885139°E	Malangata Station	
Noongal Station Group	2787		Noongal Road	Yalgoo	28.124659°S 116.824304°E	Noongall Station	
Railway Goods Shed ^{†}	4181		Piesse Street	Yalgoo	28.347151°S 116.682755°E	Part of Yalgoo Railway Station Group (2778)	
Iron Tank on Stand	4182		Piesse Street	Yalgoo	28.34794°S 116.688679°E	Part of Yalgoo Railway Station Group (2778)	
Locomotive Hotel - Site ^{†}	5493		Piesse Street	Yalgoo	28.346578°S 116.681356°E	Part of Yalgoo Railway Station Group (2778)	
Former Gaol	23795		Gibbons Street	Yalgoo	28.341261°S 116.681668°E	Part of Yalgoo Justice Precinct (2770)	
Former Railway Station	24409	28	Piesse Street	Yalgoo	28.349394°S 116.682393°E	Part of Yalgoo Railway Station Group (2778)	
Former Court House	24431		Gibbons Street	Yalgoo	28.341438°S 116.681639°E	Part of Yalgoo Justice Precinct (2770)	

- ^{†} Denotes building has been demolished
