= Simon Chorley Art & Antiques =

British company

Chorley‘s Auctioneers Limited
- Type: Private
- Industry: Auctioneering and art valuation
- Genre: Art and antiques
- Predecessor: Formerly: Bruton Knowles Fine Art & Antiques; Simon Chorley Art and Antiques Ltd
- Founded: Gloucester, England (1862)
- Headquarters: Prinknash Abbey Park, Gloucestershire, England
- Key people: (Directors) Thomas Jenner-Fust, Werner Freundel

Chorley‘s Auctioneers Limited (trading as Chorley's) is an art auctioneer and art valuation company, based in Gloucester, England. The company was founded in 1862, and conducts auction sales and carries out valuation services for private clients for insurance purposes, probate, family division and sale.

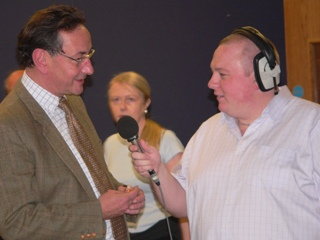
Simon Chorley has for 15 years been BBC Radio Gloucester Antiques Broadcaster

The firm provides expert witnesses to police investigations and to the Crown Prosecution Service, as well as valuation work for identifying and quantifying fine art and antiques seized under the Proceeds of Crime Act. This work is carried out in conjunction with specialist fraud teams and the Serious Organised Crime Agency.

The company is a member of the Society of Fine Art and Antique Auctioneers and Valuers, and the Association of Accredited Auctioneers, and observes these Societies' codes of due diligence for antique valuation as well as sale of chattels.

== History ==
The company was formerly the art and antiques division of Bruton Knowles. In 2006 this became Simon Chorley Art & Antiques Ltd, when the entire division moved to its current saleroom and offices at Prinknash Abbey Park. In 2022 the business was purchased by Thomas Jenner-Fust and Werner Freundel.

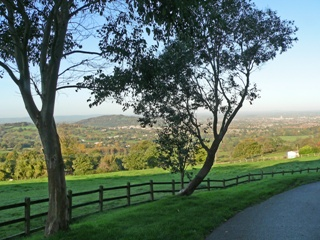
Entrance Drive Prinknash Abbey

Prinknash Abbey Park is owned by the Benedictine Community who have their Monastery at St Peter's Grange, a 17th-century country home previously owned by the Bridgeman family. The saleroom and offices are converted from the monks' old pottery. and were refurbished for the new firm's first sale in January 2007.

== Notable auctions ==
As Bruton Knowles Art & Antiques:

- The Summerfield Sale (1995, the largest fine art and antique sale ever conducted)
- Rous Lench Sale
- John Parry Sale
- Kenulf Gallery sale
- Spetchley Park sale
- Highnam Court sale

As Chorley's:

- 2024 | A Political Inheritance
- 2024 | The House of Sandys
- 2023 | The Henry Sandon Study Collection
- 2021 | The Laskett
- 2020 | Spetchley Park - The Attic Sale
- 2019 | Beverston Castle
- 2009 | Shambles Museum Sale
- 2008 | Sale including 17th-century Flemish Cabinet
- 2008 | Sale including 19th-century Irish bench seat
- 2007 | Sale including Francis Frith book of original photographs
- 2008 | Sale including items from the Prinknash Abbey Collection

== Community work ==
Auctioneers from Simon Chorley Art & Antiques regularly attend careers events in local schools and colleges and offer work experience and student placements. The firm is involved in the charity, cultural tourism and educational fields in the local Cotswold and wider three counties communities. For example, in 2007 Simon Chorley Art & Antiques, with Stroud Valleys Craftsmen, organized and hosted an exhibition of local arts and crafts made from 1894 onwards; all proceeds went to charity. Chorley's chose a local charity every year which the business supports through events and donations.
