= Caldey Abbey =

Coordinates: 51.637303°N 4.684337°W

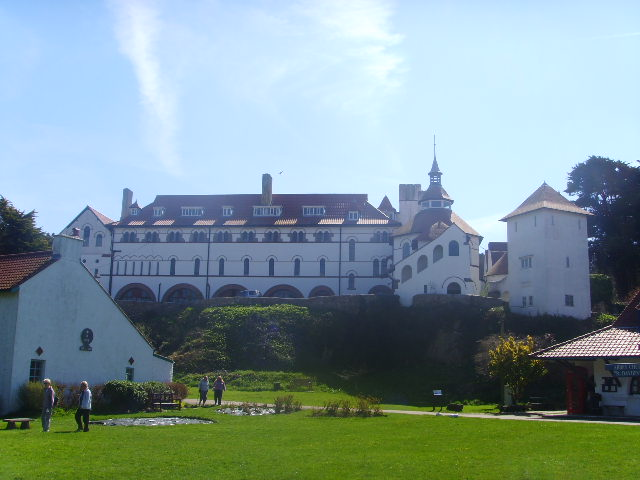

- Location of Caldey Abbey within Pembrokeshire
- Location: Caldey Island, Pembrokeshire
- Country: Wales
- Denomination: Roman Catholic Church (formerly Anglican)
- Website: www.caldeyislandwales.com

History
- Status: Abbey
- Founded: 1910

Architecture
- Functional status: Active
- Heritage designation: Grade II* listed

Administration
- Deanery: Pembroke

Caldey Abbey is an abbey of the Trappists situated on Caldey Island off the coast of Pembrokeshire, Wales, south of Tenby.

Caldey Island thrived as a centre of Cistercian activity in the Middle Ages. The current abbey is modern; it was built in 1910 by Anglican Benedictine monks; they converted to Catholicism and became members of the Trappist Order in 1929. As of 2018, there are about 10 members.

== History ==
A Celtic monastery was founded on the island in the sixth century, and a Benedictine foundation existed from 1136 until the dissolution of the monasteries in 1536. Pyro was the first abbot and Saint Samson was one of the early abbots.

William Done Bushell offered the island to Dom Aelred Carlyle in 1900. An Anglican Benedictine community, led by Carlyle, arrived six years later in 1906, and built the current abbey in the Italian style with assistance from Lord Halifax and others between 1906 and 1910. Initially a row of cottages were built for the people working on the building; hence the abbey was named as "cottage Monastery." The chapel was added in 1910. Three years later the monks were received by the Roman Catholic Church, except for a small Anglican remnant which left Caldey and moved into Abbey House, next to Pershore Abbey, Worcestershire. This was a house which had belonged to Caldey Abbey, but was returned in 1913 to its original, Anglican donor. The Anglican Benedictine community moved on from Pershore to Nashdom Abbey in 1926.

The Catholic Benedictines moved to Prinknash Abbey, Gloucestershire by 1928. Monks from the Trappist Order, who now occupy the abbey, came in 1929 from Scourmont Abbey in Belgium. The monastery was rebuilt in 1940, after a fire.

== Monastic life ==
Perfume, shortbread and chocolate production all provide income for the monks, as well as the sale of prime beef. The monastery opened an internet shop in 2001. Chocolate is also sold under the "Abbot's Kitchen" brand. The monastery used to operate a now-defunct dairy which would sell iced confectionery and cake.

=== Lavender perfume ===
Profuse growth of wild lavender flowers on Caldey Island prompted the monks of the abbey to create scents with new fragrances. They branded the scents and marketed them with the brand name “Caldey Abbey Perfumes.” With rising demand for the scent, there was need to import scent oil from outside the island. The scent is now manufactured throughout the year and is partly based on the island's gorse.

== Architecture and fittings ==
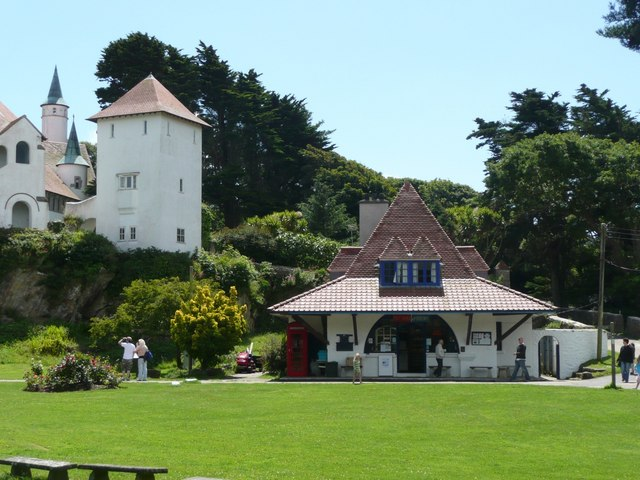
Post Office, with abbey buildings to the left

Plans began in 1906, when priest-architect John Cyril Hawes designed a master plan to evoke the medieval abbeys of Cluny, Vézelay, or Durham. John Coates Carter designed the structure in the Arts and Crafts style. It was his largest project. The roofs are of white roughcast with red tiling, while the large basement arches are of brick. The abbey church has a south tower, with five side-windows, and has a "tapering" tower with primitive crenellations. Originally, the fittings included silver and ebony altar decorations and other luxurious items, but many were destroyed in the 1940 fire. The refectory of the Abbey was made from fine timber. Inspired by an ancient pattern, it was nonetheless modern in design. Two large water tanks underground and a narrow water shaft eliminate the threat of water scarcity in dry seasons.

It is a Grade II* listed building, as is the Abbey Shop, as well as a number of other buildings on the island.

== Child abuse lawsuit ==
In August 2016, three women launched legal action against the abbey seeking compensation for sexual abuse they had suffered at the hands of one of the abbey's monks between 1972 and 1987, when they were children. They alleged that Father Thaddeus Kotik, who lived in the abbey from 1947 until his death in 1992, abused at least six girls whose families holidayed on the island. The abbey reached a financial settlement with six claimants and apologised for failing to report the abuse when they became aware of it in 1990. Dyfed-Powys Police were made aware in 2014 and 2016. Six victims received financial compensation under an out-of-court settlement reached in March 2017.

In November 2017, as a result of media coverage of the allegations, five more women came forward to accuse Kotik of abusing them. At the same time it emerged that Paul Ashton, a fugitive child sex offender, had fled to the abbey in 2004 and remained there until 2011 using a pseudonym. He was arrested after a visitor recognised him from Crimestoppers' "Most Wanted" list. During his time at the abbey Ashton, who had absconded from West Sussex, operated the island's satellite internet and telephone systems, managed online accommodation bookings and accounts, and worked in the mail room. Ashton pleaded guilty to possessing more than 5,000 indecent images of children, including on computer equipment at the abbey.

In 2021 a man came forward saying that he had also been a victim and demanding a public enquiry into the events and subsequent cover-up. In 2024 the abbey instituted and published an independent review, headed by Jan Pickles, a former assistant police and crime commissioner at South Wales Police.

== See also ==
- Caldey Priory

== Bibliography ==
- The Benedictines of Caldey: The Story of the Anglican Benedictines of Caldey and Their Submission to the Catholic Church, with illustrations by the author. London: Burns, Oates & Washbourne. 1940. LCCN 40030835.
- Dunstan, Petà (2009). The Labour of Obedience: The Benedictines of Pershore, Nashdom and Elmore - a History. Norwich: Canterbury Press. ISBN 978-1-85311-974-3.
- Williams, David H. (2001). The Welsh Cistercians: Written to Commemorate the Centenary of the Death of Stephen William Williams (1837-1899), the Father of Cistercian Archaeology in Wales (3 ed.). Gracewing. ISBN 9780852443545.
