= St Margaret's Island =

Tidal island in Pembrokeshire, Wales

Coordinates: 51.64310°N 4.71693°W

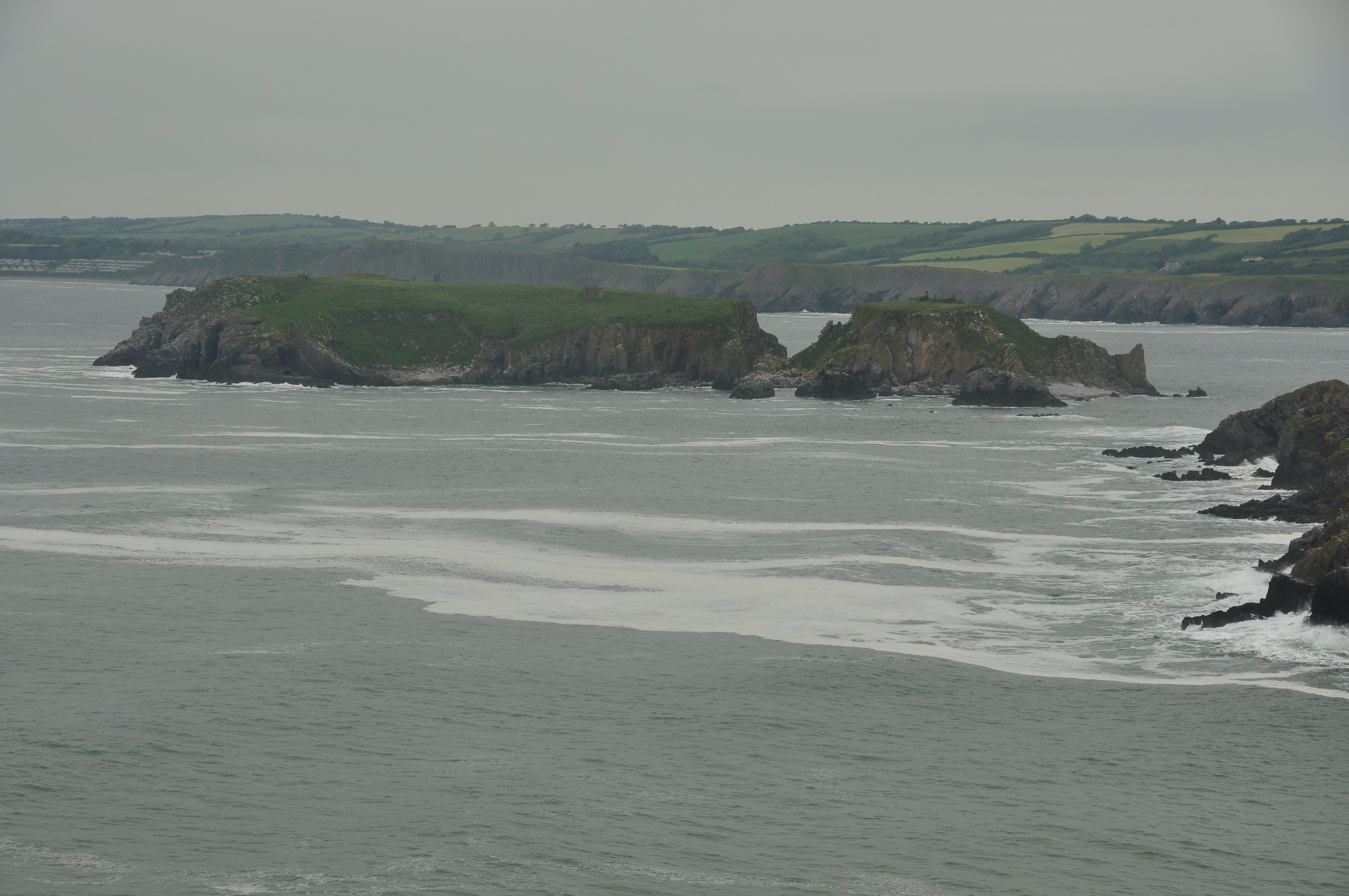
St Margaret's Island seen from Caldey Island, with Pembrokeshire mainland beyond

Location of St Margaret's Island in southwest Wales

St Margaret's Island (Welsh: Ynys Farged) is a small tidal island to the northwest of Caldey Island in Carmarthen Bay, Pembrokeshire, Wales.

== Name ==
The island derives its modern (English) name from a chapel that was built there, probably in the 17th century. The island has also been known as Little Caldey.

== Description ==
At high tide the island is separated from Caldey Island by Little Sound. There are a number of ruins on the island. There is no public access to the island; access on foot from Caldey at low tide is dangerous. Its highest point is 40 metres (130 ft) and its area is 7 hectares (17 acres).

The waters around the island are popular with divers.

== History ==
Religious connections to the island date back to at least 1748. In Victorian times the chapel was converted into housing for local quarry workers, who mined limestone on the island, which was abandoned by 1851. The buildings subsequently fell into ruin. The chapel ruins and a field enclosure are recorded by the Royal Commission on Ancient monuments.

Since 1950 the island has been leased from Picton Castle Estate. It is designated a Site of Special Scientific Interest. It is managed by The Wildlife Trust of South & West Wales, with management limited to monitoring seabird populations owing to difficult access.

== Wildlife ==
St Margaret's Island is a sensitive conservation site because of the birds that nest on its cliffs: cormorants (the largest population of this species in Wales, constituting 3% of the total British population), guillemots, razorbills, shags, kittiwakes, great black-backed gulls, lesser black-backed gulls and herring gulls. Puffins breed in rock fissures, but the existence of brown rats prevents burrow nests.

== Vegetation ==
Common vegetation is red fescue, common nettle, hogweed, false oat grass and cocksfoot. On seaward edges sea beet, common scurvy grass and common mallow can be seen.
