= Aelred Carlyle =

English monk

Aelred Carlyle OSB (born Benjamin Fearnley Carlyle; 7 February 1874 – 14 October 1955) was an English monk who founded the first regularised Anglican Benedictine community of monks around 1895.

== Early life and monastic profession ==
Born Benjamin Fearnley Carlyle, he was educated at Blundell's School. In 1892, he commenced medical training at St Bartholomew's Hospital, London, but did not complete his training. Influenced by the Oxford Movement, he embraced a vision of monastic life as he envisioned it having been followed in the Middle Ages, full of ritual and tradition. A charismatic individual, Carlyle succeeded where others had failed in having the vision of such a life within the Church of England approved by the Archbishop of Canterbury. By 1895 he had established a community of monks under his leadership, taking religious vows under the monastic name of Aelred, assuming the role of abbot.

== Establishment of Caldey and conversion to Catholicism ==
After several moves, Carlyle's community was established on Caldey Island, South Wales in 1906. When the Caldey Island community came into conflict with the Bishop of Oxford in 1913 over conformity to Anglican practices, Carlyle and most of his monks became Catholic. They were only the second such group to be received in a corporate manner into the Catholic Church, after the Society of the Atonement (Franciscan) in the U.S. several years earlier. The Community were received into the Catholic Church on 21 February 1913, and on 1 March that year Abbot Columba Marmion of Maredsous Abbey visited the island to assist the community in its preparations for its entrance into full communion. In May 1913 Abbot Marmion took Carlyle (in Roman terms at this point a simple layman) to Rome for an audience with Pope Pius X, and on 29 June Marmion presided at the Solemn Mass at Caldey Abbey during which the community received the habit and the canonical establishment of the monastery became finalised. Following the establishment of Caldey as a Benedictine monastery proper, Carlyle spent a probationary year at Maredsous before taking his solemn monastic vows in June 1914 and being ordained priest several weeks later on 5 July. He then returned to Caldey as its abbot.

Due to financial pressures, the community moved to Prinknash Park, Gloucestershire, in 1928. It established daughter communities at St Michael's Abbey, Farnborough in 1947, and Pluscarden Abbey the following year. While still a member of the Church of England, Carlyle served as canonical visitor to two Benedictine communities of nuns. The first, the Community of Ss Mary and Scholastica, founded in 1868 in Middlesex, also became Catholic in 1913, and now resides at Curzon Park, Chester. The second, originally named the Community of the Holy Comforter, had been an active Anglican sisterhood founded in 1891, but adopted the enclosed Benedictine life under Carlyle's inspiration in 1906. This community remained Anglican and has resided at Malling Abbey since 1916, replacing the other community which had moved to North Wales after their reception into the Catholic Church.

== Carlyle and Ignatius Lyne ==
Carlyle's role in the re-establishment of monasticism in the Anglican Communion differs from that of Joseph Leycester Lyne in that the Caldey order, whilst incorporating many features of Roman Catholic Benedictine practice, did actually seek to remain at first a specifically Anglican foundation under defined Anglican obedience. When in 1913 the position of Carlyle and many of his community became untenable, it was to Rome that the Order submitted. Lyne, meanwhile, never seems to have had much grip on Benedictine spirituality per se, preferring a more eclectic approach which for all its Catholic trappings was much more characterised by its creator's essential Evangelicalism and even Calvinism. Although Lyne styled himself "Father Ignatius of Jesus OSB", leading some to place him before Carlyle as the father of Anglican Benedictinism (Lyne himself saw his role as being senior to that of Carlyle in this respect), his claim on Anglican obedience is much diluted by the fact that for many years he held no licence to officiate and proved unwilling to submit to conditions which might have permitted an Anglican bishop either to restore licensed status to him or to ordain him beyond the diaconate he had received in 1860. Lyne's eventual ordination to the priesthood at the hands of the controversial Old Catholic prelate Rene Vilatte in 1898 ended any claims Lyne might have had on Anglican status altogether, a fact underlined by the erasure of his name from Crockford's Clerical Directory (a publication in which as a "priest in colonial Orders", Carlyle never appeared either, despite being in better standing), and therefore any notion of the two abbots, Lyne and Carlyle, being part of one Anglican Order of St Benedict has no basis in fact. The only linking between the two Orders came following Lyne's death in 1908, when the "new Abbey of Llanthony" which Lyne had built passed into the hands of the Caldey Benedictines, at a time when its Prior, Dom Asaph Harris (who died in 1959) had also submitted to Vilatte and only two elderly nuns (whose names and religious affiliation have been lost to time) remained in a corrugated iron enclosure. Carlyle found he had no use for maintaining the "older foundation" and apart from sending monks there on occasional retreat did not use it at all, despite his ownership of it under the terms of Lyne's will.

== Relationship with Peter Anson ==
Carlyle enjoyed a close relationship with Peter Anson (1889–1976), who was among the monks of Caldey who seceded to Rome in 1913 and who, having left the cloister for a career as a writer and artist on religious and maritime matters, became Carlyle's biographer. Anson, whose particular brand of Catholicism included beliefs in continual revelation and in the paranormal, later claimed that he had received a psychic communication from Carlyle at the moment of the former abbot's death in 1955. Some have speculated that the relationship between Carlyle and Anson may have been in some sense homoerotic, based upon Anson's assertion that under Carlyle's rule "particular spiritual friendships" were not discouraged, but the most vocal promoter of the idea that Carlyle may have been actively gay seems overly keen upon accentuating his role as a self-styled abbot of an Anglican foundation after the manner of Ignatius Lyne at the expense of his eventual emergence as the Roman Catholic Abbot of Caldey in good standing. This of course proves nothing, but it does lead to questions regarding objectivity. Against this has to be set the actuality that the primary source for information regarding the Caldey Benedictines is Anson, who is credited as being the leading authority on the subject despite his closeness to Carlyle himself, who appears to have regarded Anson as a close friend despite Anson's somewhat unpredictable nature and his inability to settle to the monastic life. In the final analysis, the question of whether Carlyle could be considered either a religious mountebank or "gay icon" cannot be resolved, though the former evaluation seems unfair and even inaccurate. Furthermore, as the ecclesiastical historian Rene Kollar OSB indicates: "Unlike others who sought and failed to bring Roman Catholic practices into the Established Church and failed, Carlyle enjoyed the explicit ecclesiastical sanction of the Archbishop of Canterbury for his work, and with this seal of approval he could dismiss critics and disbelievers...". It should also be recognised that whilst Anson's biography of Carlyle indicates that expressions of filial affection between monks "sometimes took a form which would not be found in any normal monastery to-day (the) embraces, ceremonial and non-ceremonial, were regarded as symbolical of fraternal charity". His indication that "Our variant of the Roman rite permitted a real hug and kisses on the cheek between the giver and the recipient of the Pax Domini at the conventual Mass" appears an honest statement of how things were, and cannot of itself be seen as indicating any departure from celibacy either on the part of Carlyle or of any other monk who was under vows at Caldey during the Anglican years (the reference here to the "Pax Domini" reflecting the use of the Tridentine Mass even before the Caldey Benedictine Order made its collective submission to Rome).

== From monk to missionary and final years ==
After some years as Abbot of Caldey, Carlyle left the cloistered life in 1921 and released from his Benedictine vows in 1935. He worked for many years as a missionary priest in Canada ending as a secular priest in Vancouver. Upon his retirement in 1951, he returned to England and became a conventual (i.e., residential) oblate at Prinknash Abbey. In 1953, he was allowed to renew his solemn monastic vows. When he died in 1955, he was a full member of the community he had founded sixty years earlier. He was permitted the dignity of abbot at his funeral, and an abbatial mitre and crozier were placed on his coffin. Caldey has been in the hands of the Cistercian Order since 1929.
