= Caldey Lighthouse =

Lighthouse in Pembrokeshire, Wales

Caldey Island Lighthouse
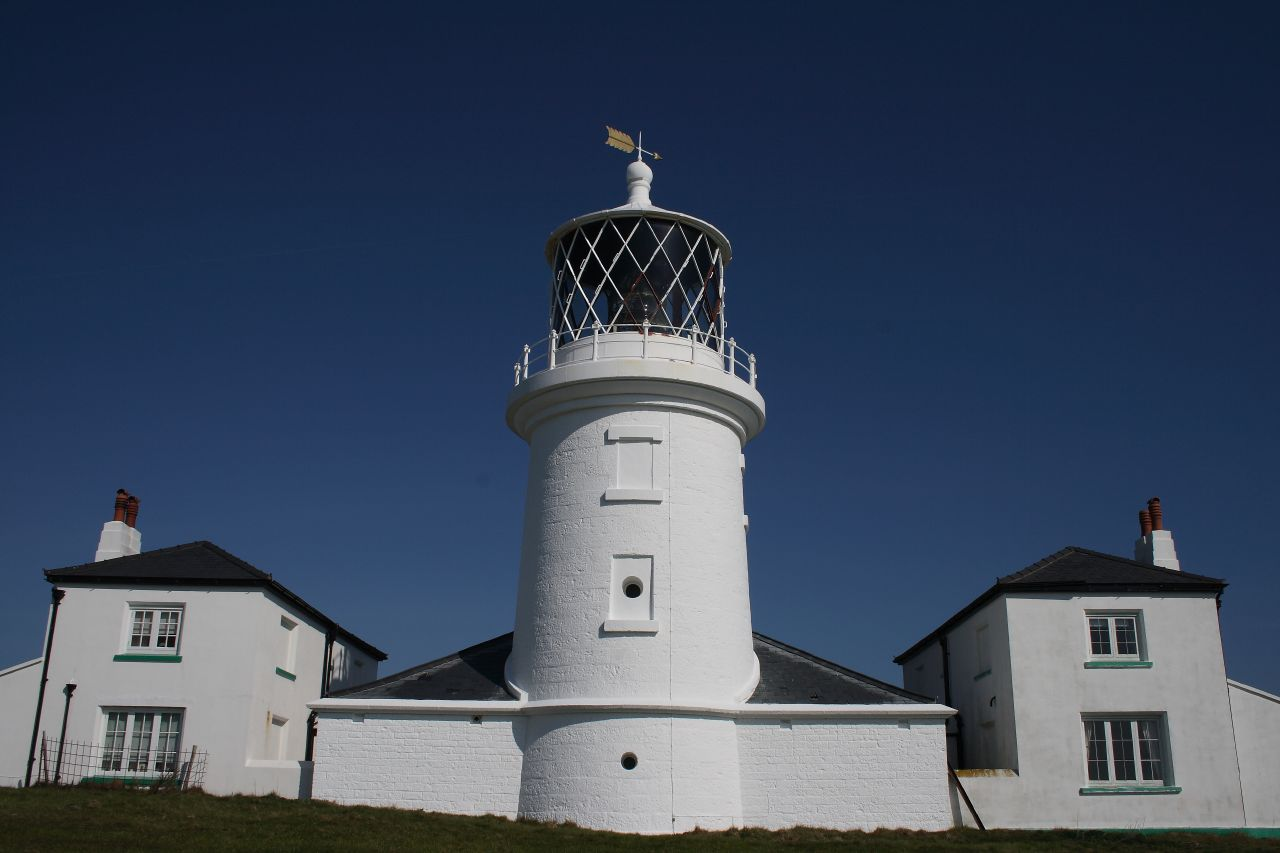
- Caldey Island Lighthouse in 2007
- Location: Caldey Island; Pembrokeshire; Wales
- Coordinates: 51.631559°N 4.684274°W

Tower
- Constructed: 1829
- Construction: brick tower
- Automated: 1927
- Height: 16 metres (52 ft)
- Shape: massive cylindrical tower with balcony and lantern
- Markings: white tower and lantern
- Power source: solar power
- Operator: Trinity House
- Heritage: Grade II listed building

Light
- Focal height: 65 metres (213 ft)
- Lens: 2nd Order (700mm) catadioptric
- Intensity: 5,010 candela
- Range: 13 nautical miles (24 km; 15 mi)
- Characteristic: Fl (3) WR 20s.

Caldey Lighthouse is located on the south end of Caldey Island, three miles (5 km) off the south Pembrokeshire, Wales coastline, a small island inhabited by a Cistercian monastery.

== Construction and dimensions ==
An application to build the Lighthouse was made in March 1827 on behalf of traders in Carmarthen Bay. It was commissioned by Trinity House and built by Joseph Nelson at a cost of £4,460. The light was first lit in 1829.

The Lighthouse is a squat, round, brick-lined limestone tower of 17.07 m (56 ft), with walls 0.91 m (3 ft) thick at the base and 2 ft 6 in (0.76 m) thick at the top. The light stands 64 m (210 ft) above high-water mark. It acts in conjunction with the Lundy North lighthouse to the south, and has a range of 13 nautical miles (24 km). The former oil store for the lighthouse is a listed structure.

== Lantern and lamp ==
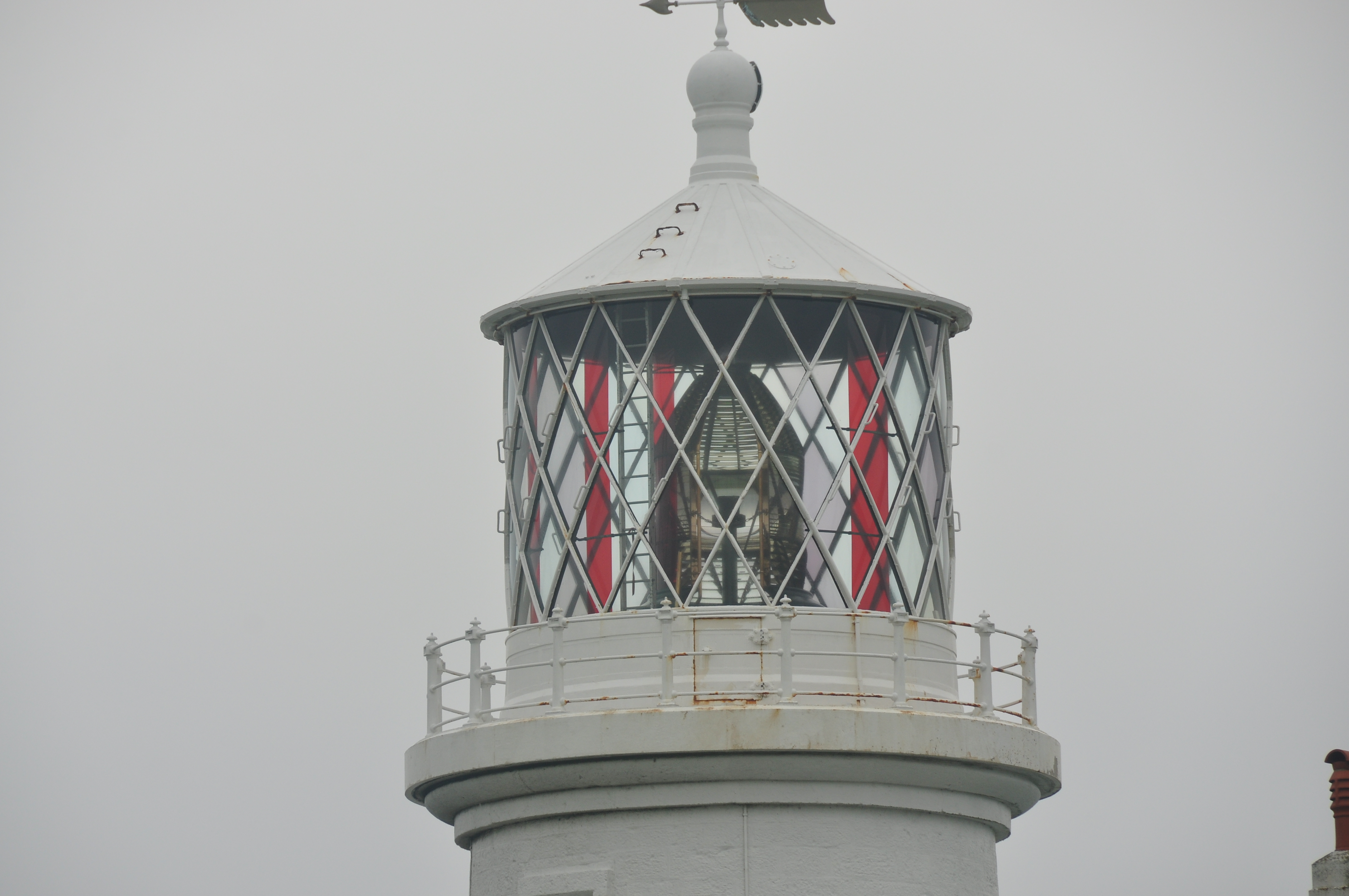
Lantern and optic in 2013

The present lantern was fitted around the middle of the nineteenth century and consisted of 20 Argand lamps and reflectors, subsequently replaced by a helical lantern later in the nineteenth century.

The Lighthouse was converted to automatic operations in 1929. It was the last Trinity House lighthouse to be powered by gas, eventually being converted to electricity in 1997.

The light was intended to help coastal traffic trading limestone and coal to mid and north Wales but the light also helped long-distance and north American traffic identify the Bristol Channel and avoid confusion with the English Channel.

== Keeper's cottages ==
The lighthouse keepers' cottages, that flank the Lighthouse, are two-storey, with hipped roofs, octagonal chimneys, and a one-storey linking corridor. This forms a ‘U’-shape, with the Lighthouse at the centre of the south side, and enclosed gardens to the north. The cottages were built around 1868-70 by T. C. Harvey, C.E.

== In art ==
Cardiff Central Library holds a wash drawing by Charles Norris showing the Lighthouse under construction.

== See also ==
- List of lighthouses in Wales
- Trinity House

== Sources ==
- Hague, D. B., Lighthouses of Wales Their Architecture and Archaeology (Royal Commission on the Ancient and Historical Monuments of Wales, 1994), ISBN 1-871184-08-8
- Lloyd, T., Orbach, J., Scourfield, R., The Buildings of Wales: Pembrokeshire (Yale University Press, 2004), ISBN 0-300-10178-3.
