= John Hawes =

British architect and priest (1876–1956)

- Title: Monsignor

Personal life
- Born: 7 September 1876 Richmond, Surrey, England
- Died: 26 June 1956 (aged 79) Miami, Florida

Religious life
- Religion: Church of England (previously); Roman Catholicism (from 1911)

Senior posting
- Period in office: 1903-1956

John Cyril Hawes (7 September 1876 – 26 June 1956) was a British architect and priest. Hawes was known for designing and constructing church buildings in England, Western Australia and The Bahamas. He served as a priest in the Church of England before converting to Roman Catholicism and received ordination as a Catholic priest. He was later named a domestic prelate by Pope Pius XI and given the title "monsignor". After retiring he lived as a hermit in The Bahamas, becoming known more commonly as Father Jerome.

== Biography ==
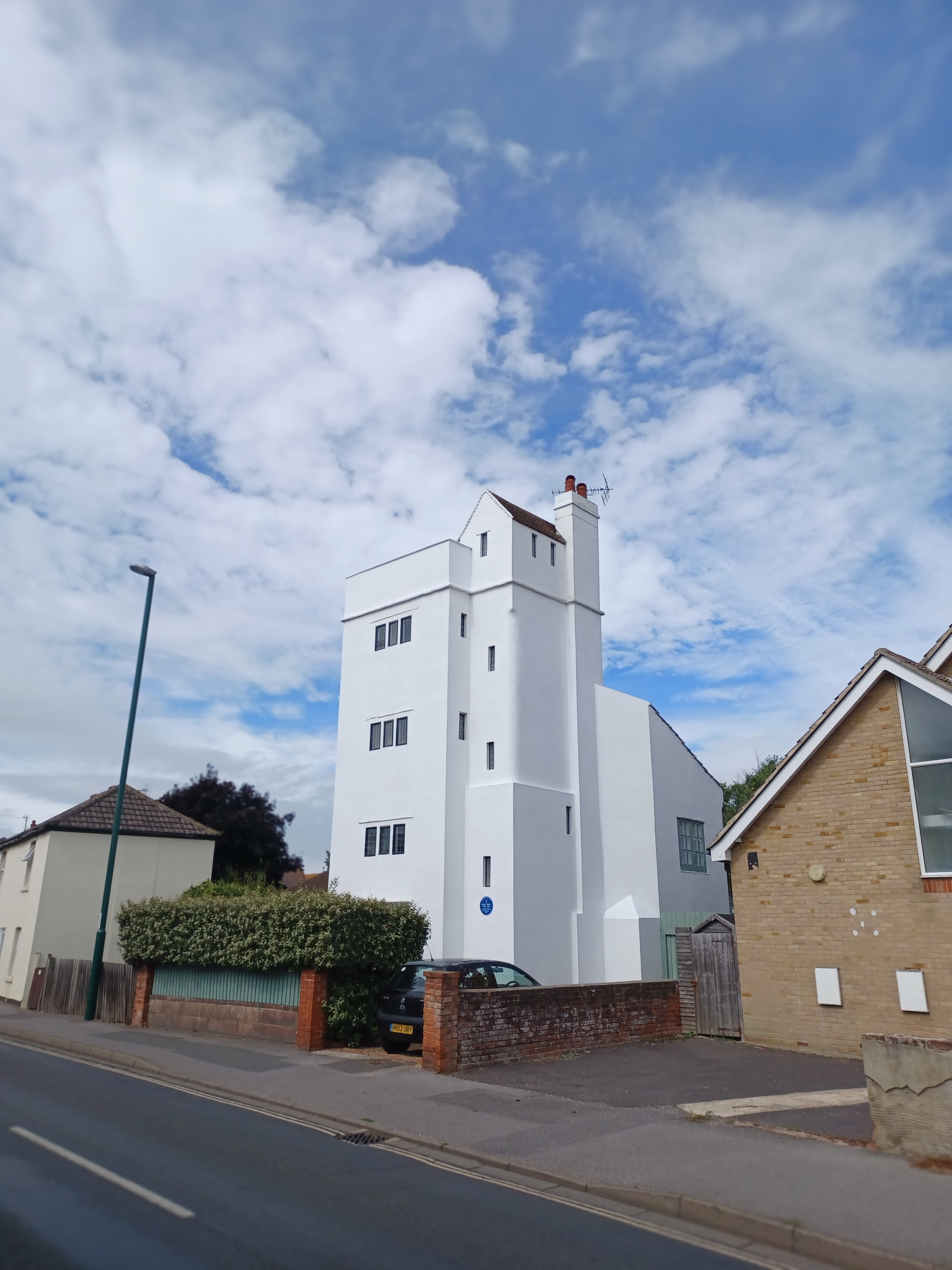
White Tower, Bognor Regis; built as a holiday home for Hawes and his brothers

Hawes was born in Richmond, Surrey, to Edward, a solicitor, and Amelia Hawes. He was educated in Brighton and at the King's School, Canterbury. After leaving school he began training as an architect in London in 1893 with architects Edmeston and Gabriel. He also received formal architectural education at the Architectural Association School as well as the Central School of Arts and Crafts.

In 1897 he began practising as an architect, designing houses at Bognor. After winning a design competition, Hawes was commissioned to build his first church, St Christopher's, Gunnerton, Northumberland, in 1899.

After studying at Lincoln Theological College he was ordained as a Church of England priest in 1903. He was a curate at Our Most Holy Redeemer in Clerkenwell and, in 1906, joined the Anglican Benedictine community of Caldey Abbey where he developed a master plan to evoke the medieval abbeys of Cluny, Vézelay, or Durham. In 1909 Hawes was invited to join the Church of England mission in The Bahamas where many churches had been damaged by a hurricane. On Long Island he ministered to his native parishioners, repaired the churches, and, in 1910, he designed St Paul's Church in Clarence Town.

In 1911 he left The Bahamas for the United States where he converted to Roman Catholicism. After leading a nomadic existence in Canada and the United States for several years, including working as a labourer and as a railway teamster, he began studying for the priesthood at Beda College in Rome. He was ordained a Catholic priest in Rome on 27 February 1915, after which he was sent to Geraldton, Western Australia, where he worked as a priest, architect and builder. In recognition of his work in church design and architecture he was named a monsignor by Pope Pius XI in 1937.

In May 1939, Hawes sailed from Fremantle, returning to The Bahamas, officially on a pilgrimage. He designed and built the Mount Alvernia Hermitage on Como Hill at Cat Island, which became his home. Along with this hermitage, he also designed five churches in the Bahamas as well as a second church at Clarence Town, St Peter's.

He died on 26 June 1956 in Miami, Florida, aged 79 and at his own request was buried in a cave located beneath the hermitage at Cat Island.

== Architectural works ==
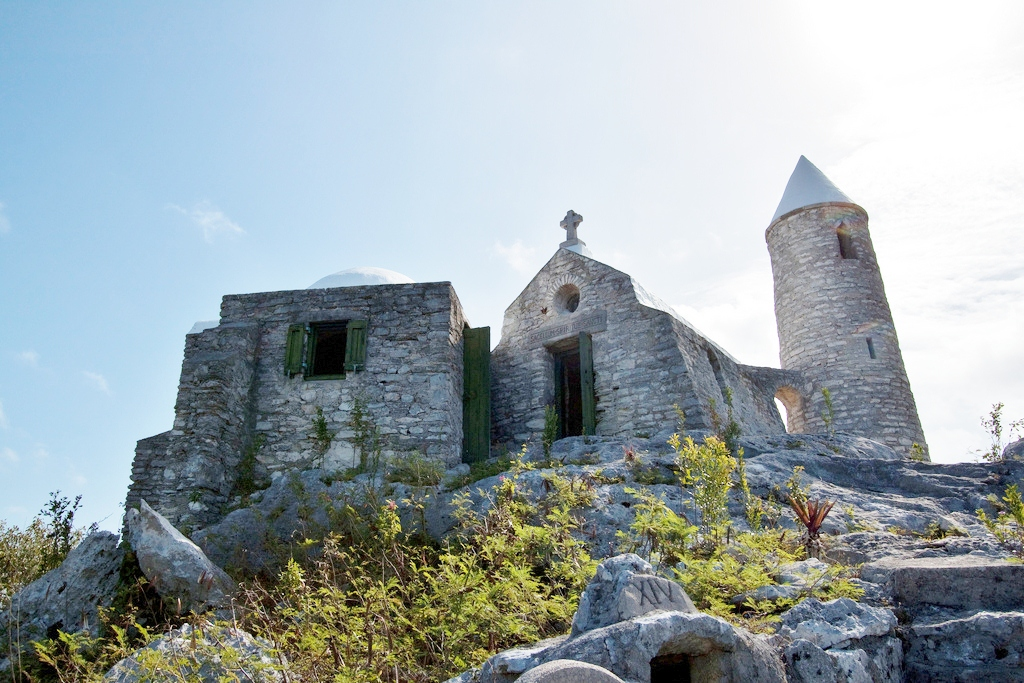
The Hermitage on Mount Alvernia, Cat Island, Bahamas

Hawes's architectural work in the Mid West region of Western Australia was prolific. He was appointed Diocesan Architect and designed:

- The Cathedral of St Francis Xavier, a Spanish Mission style cathedral in Geraldton. The completed building was officially opened in 1938
- Nazareth House in Geraldton
- The Cemetery Chapel of the Holy Spirit in Utakarra, Geraldton
- The Hermitage in Geraldton
- The Church of Our Lady of Mount Carmel in Mullewa
- Churches for many agricultural towns in the region; including Morawa, Perenjori, Yalgoo and Northampton.
- Two private residences, one being the homestead for Melangata Station north of Yalgoo; the other the White Tower in Bognor Regis, UK, built as a holiday residence.
Images of some of Hawes's buildings in the Mid West of Western Australia

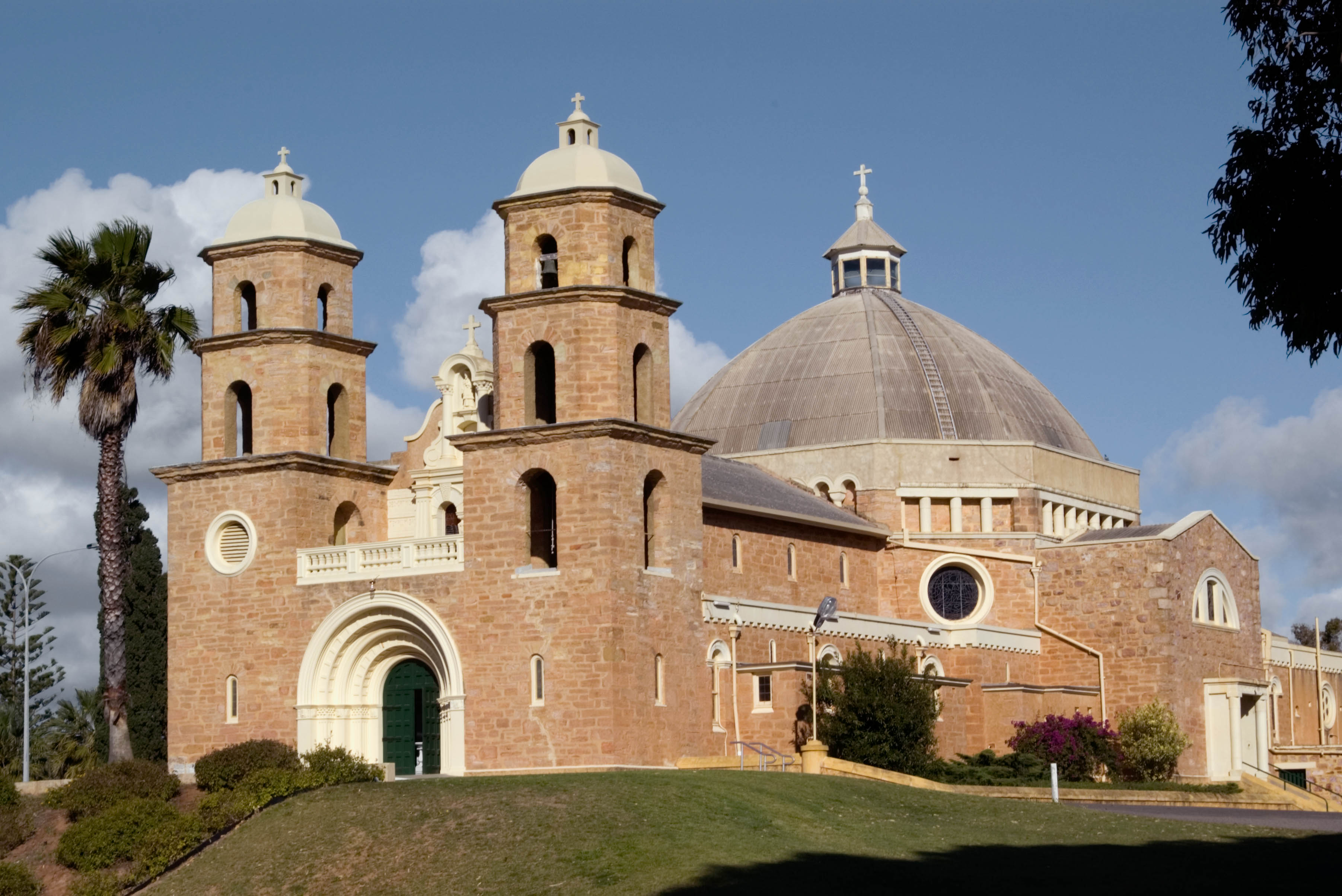
Geraldton Cathedral

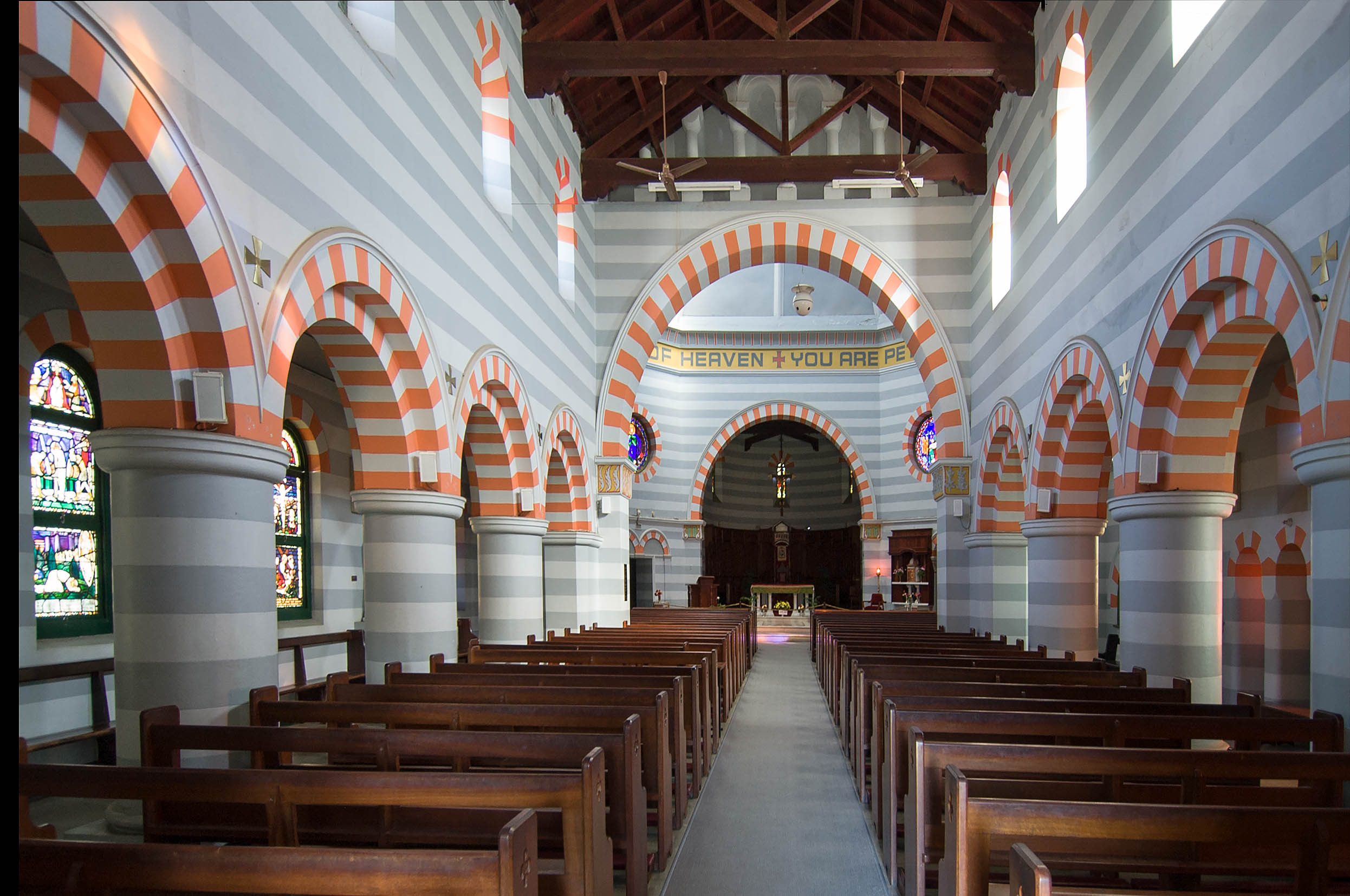
Geraldton Cathedral, nave

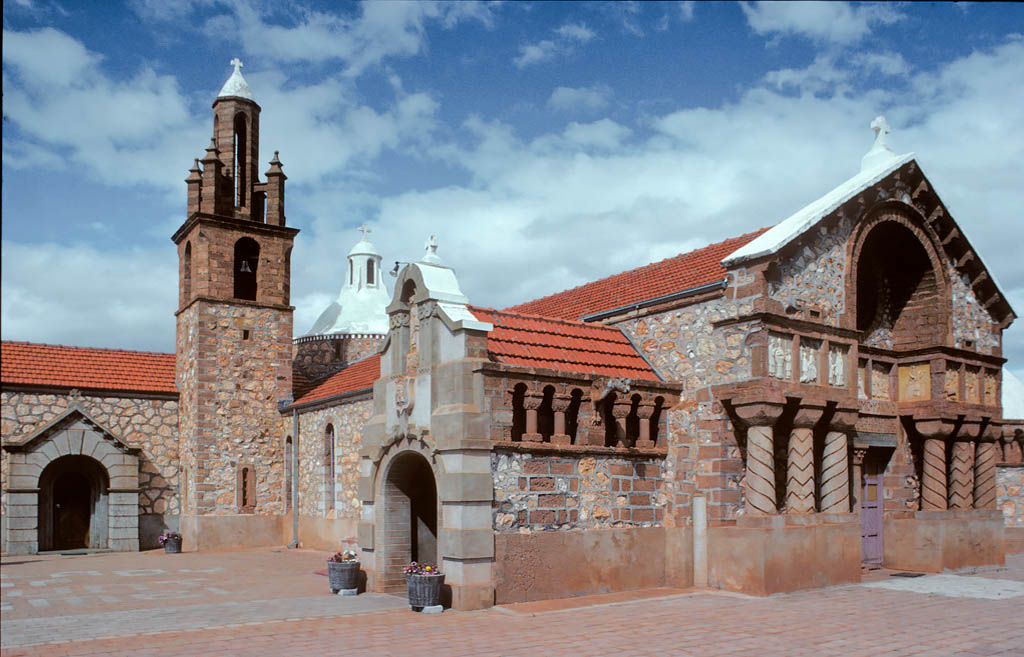
The Church, Mullewa

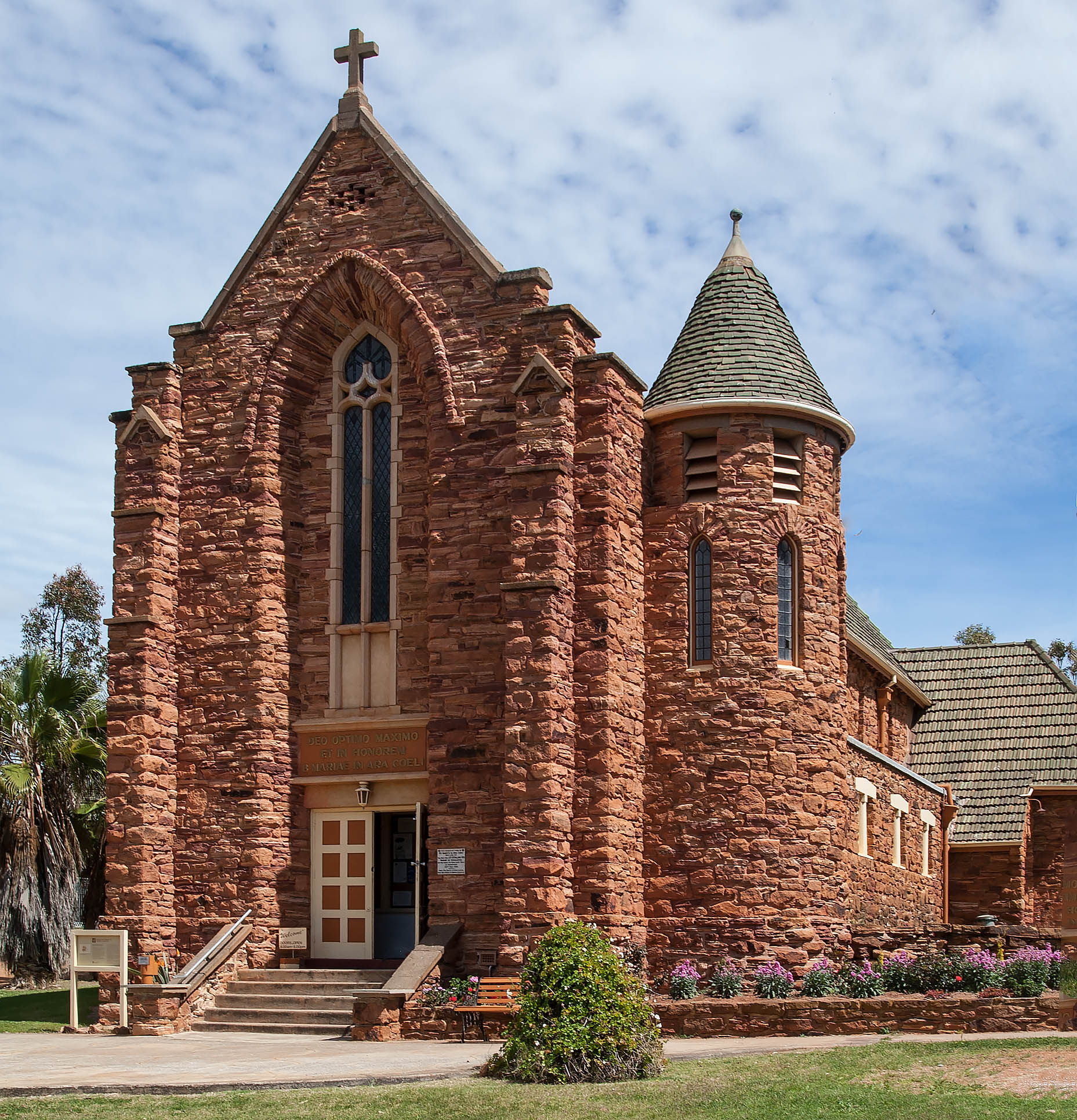
The Church of Our Lady in Ara Coeli, Northampton

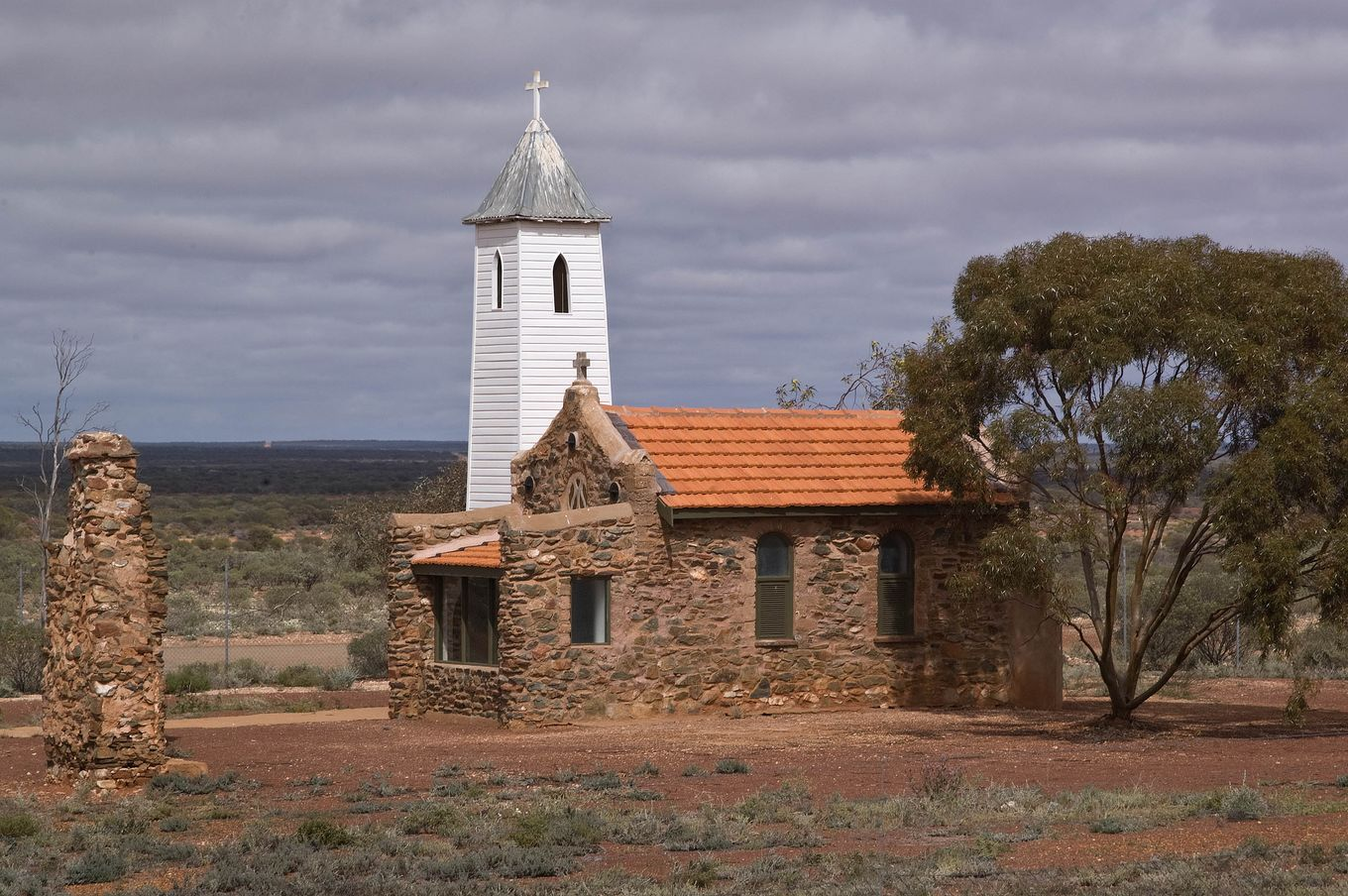
Convent of St Hyacinth, Yalgoo, Mgr Hawes 1922 side view

The Monsignor Hawes Heritage Trail is a tourist route which visits many of these buildings, some of which he also built.

Hawes also designed the Anglican Church of St Christopher, in Gunnerton, a small village in the North Tyne valley, Northumberland. The building has been restored and now has a stained glass window by William Tillyer in the west end.
