= Caldey Priory =

Coordinates: 51.6348°N 4.6879°W

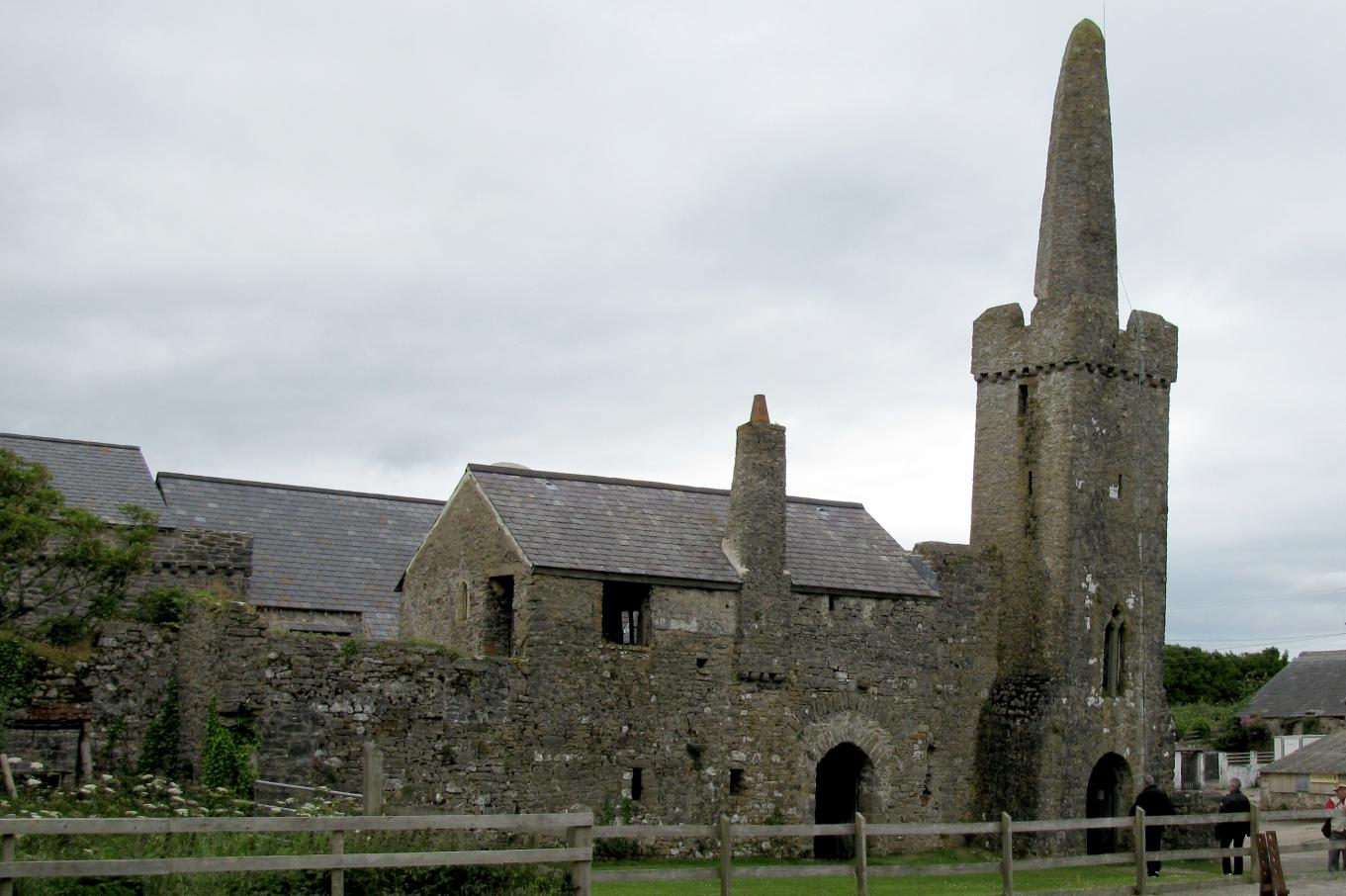
- Caldey Priory, 2013

- Location of Caldey Abbey within Pembrokeshire
- Location: Caldey Island, Pembrokeshire
- Country: Wales

History
- Status: Priory
- Founded: 12th century

Architecture
- Heritage designation: Grade I listed

Caldey Priory is a Grade I-listed priory on Caldey Island off the coast of Pembrokeshire, Wales, some 300 metres (330 yd) south of the modern Caldey Abbey. The priory gardens are listed on the Cadw/ICOMOS Register of Parks and Gardens of Special Historic Interest in Wales.

== History ==
Sir Robert fitz Martin was granted the island in 1113 and his mother Geva founded St Mary’s Priory as a daughter house of the Tironensian St Dogmaels Abbey in the 12th century. The priory became a cell of St Dogmaels.

It was constructed of limestone and indigenous sandstone around a small courtyard, and probably built on a preexisting Celtic Christian site, and lasted to the Dissolution of the Monasteries in 1539. It was a very small monastery, with the number of monks resident there ranging from one in the late 12th century, four in 1402 and six in 1504.

The property was acquired by one John Bradshawe of Presteigne and passed through a succession of owners. The buildings were significantly upgraded in the 16th century after the priory was secularized, but there is no evidence that they were used by either of the owning families of the time. Several centuries later they were used as a farm house, centered on St Illtyd's priory church. Around 1800 they became the farm buildings for a new house built for Thomas Kynaston, owner of the island from 1798.

According to Rev. W. D. Bushell, who bought the priory in 1897, the church was in very bad repair and had been used as a blacksmith shop. In 1838, extensive work was done on the south and east walls of the chancel, and the roof. Bushell sold the property in 1906 to the Anglican Benedictine community that built the current abbey, but rented the house and the priory until he died in 1917. The house was subsequently demolished in the 1970s.

The priory buildings are built from rubble stone, with slate roofs, and are grouped around a small courtyard. Over the centuries they have been altered many times and have a very complex history. On the north side was a domestic range that has not survived. The gatehouse is on the western side and there is a two-storey dormitory with a tower on the eastern. The church stands on the south side, and consists of nave, chancel and west tower with a spire.

St Illtyd's church is a consecrated Roman Catholic Church.
