= Sylvester Houédard =

Benedictine priest and poet (1924–1992)

Dom Sylvester Houédard
- Born: Pierre (Peter) Thomas Paul Jean Houédard; 16 February 1924; Guernsey. United Kingdom
- Died: 15 January 1992 (aged 67)
- Education: Jesus College, Oxford
- Known for: poetry, concrete poetry, literary criticism, theology, translation, spirituality

Dom Pierre-Sylvester Houédard /ˈwɛdɑːr/ WED-ar (16 February 1924 – 15 January 1992), also known by the initials "dsh", was a British Benedictine priest, theologian and noted concrete poet.

== Life ==
Born on Guernsey, as Pierre (Peter) Thomas Paul Jean Houédard, he was educated at Jesus College, Oxford. He served in British Army Intelligence from 1944 to 1947, and in 1949 joined the Benedictine Prinknash Abbey in Gloucestershire, being ordained as a priest in 1959 and taking the religious name Sylvester. In 2025 Prinknash Abbey issued a formal apology for the sexual abuse of Geoffrey Smiles, then a pupil at Sherborne public school, by Houédard.

=== Concrete poet ===
Houédard was a leading exponent of concrete poetry, with regular contributions to magazines and exhibitions from the early 1960s onward. His elaborate, typewriter-composed visual poems ("typestracts") were scattered across many chapbooks, including Kinkon (1965) and Tantric Poems Perhaps (1967). Among his best-known works is the poem "Frog-Pond-Plop", his English rendition of a zen haiku by Matsuo Bashō. Houédard also edited four issues of the magazine Kroklok (1971–1976), a periodical devoted to research into the history of sound poetry.

=== Bible translator ===
Houédard became literary editor of the Jerusalem Bible in 1961.

=== Other interests ===
Houédard cultivated an interest in multiple religious traditions; he wrote commentaries on Meister Eckhart and was a founder-member of the Eckhart Society, as well as an honorary fellow of the Muhyiddin Ibn Arabi Society. He published several works of literary criticism, often with eccentric typography, and corresponded widely with leading poets, artists, theologians and philosophers of his day, including Robert Graves, Edwin Morgan, Allen Ginsberg, William S. Burroughs, Jack Kerouac, Lionel Kearns, Mark Boyle, John Blofeld, Michael Horovitz and Ian Hamilton Finlay. In 1965, Houédard collaborated with Jasia Reichardt from the Institute of Contemporary Arts in London on a book about the connection between poetry and painting. Houédard collaborated next with Filipino poet and artist David Medalla in a modern ballet entitled The Yellow Wrinkled Pea, inspired by the life and scientific discoveries of the monk Gregor Mendel; the modern ballet, choreographed by Medalla, was performed in 1967 by members of the Exploding Galaxy at Middle Earth in Covent Garden, London, in 1967. Houédard contributed a poem to Signals, the avant-garde news bulletin by Medalla in the 1960s. Houédard, Medalla and Antonio Sena exhibited together at the Lisson Gallery in London in 1967. Medalla curated the first solo exhibition by Houédard in 1976 at Artists for Democracy's Fitzrovia Cultural Centre, 143 Whitfield Street, London.

=== Publications ===
In 2012, Occasional Papers published Notes from the Cosmic Typewriter, a book devoted to Houédard, edited by Nicola Simpson, with essays by Gustavo Grandal Montero, Rick Poynor, David Toop and Charles Verey.
