= Prinknash Abbey =

Roman Catholic monastery in Gloucestershire, England

Coordinates: 51°49′21″N 2°10′34″W

Prinknash Abbey The Abbey of Our Lady and St Peter at Prinknash
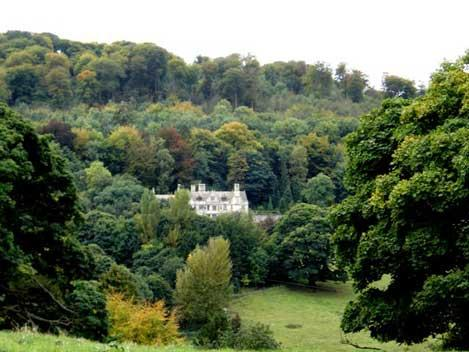
- Prinknash Abbey
- Interactive map of Prinknash Abbey; The Abbey of Our Lady and St Peter at Prinknash

Monastery information
- Order: Benedictine, Subiaco Congregation
- Diocese: Diocese of Clifton (Roman Catholic Church)

People
- Founders: writer of the Rule--Saint Benedict, 6th century. The present community was founded in 1896 in the Anglican Communion, became Roman Catholic in 1913, and came to Prinknash in 1928.
- Important associated figures: Dom Bede Griffiths, Ælred Carlyle, Sylvester Houédard, Stephen Horton

Prinknash Abbey (pronounced locally variously as "Prinidge/Prinnish") (IPA: /ˈprɪnɪdʒ/) is a Roman Catholic monastery in the Vale of Gloucester in the Diocese of Clifton, near the village of Cranham, Gloucestershire. It belongs to the English Province of the Subiaco Cassinese Congregation, which is itself part of the worldwide Benedictine Confederation. It is noted for blending resins and fragrance oils for church incense.

== History ==
=== Early history ===
Prinknash Park, home of Sir Thomas Jones Howell (1826)

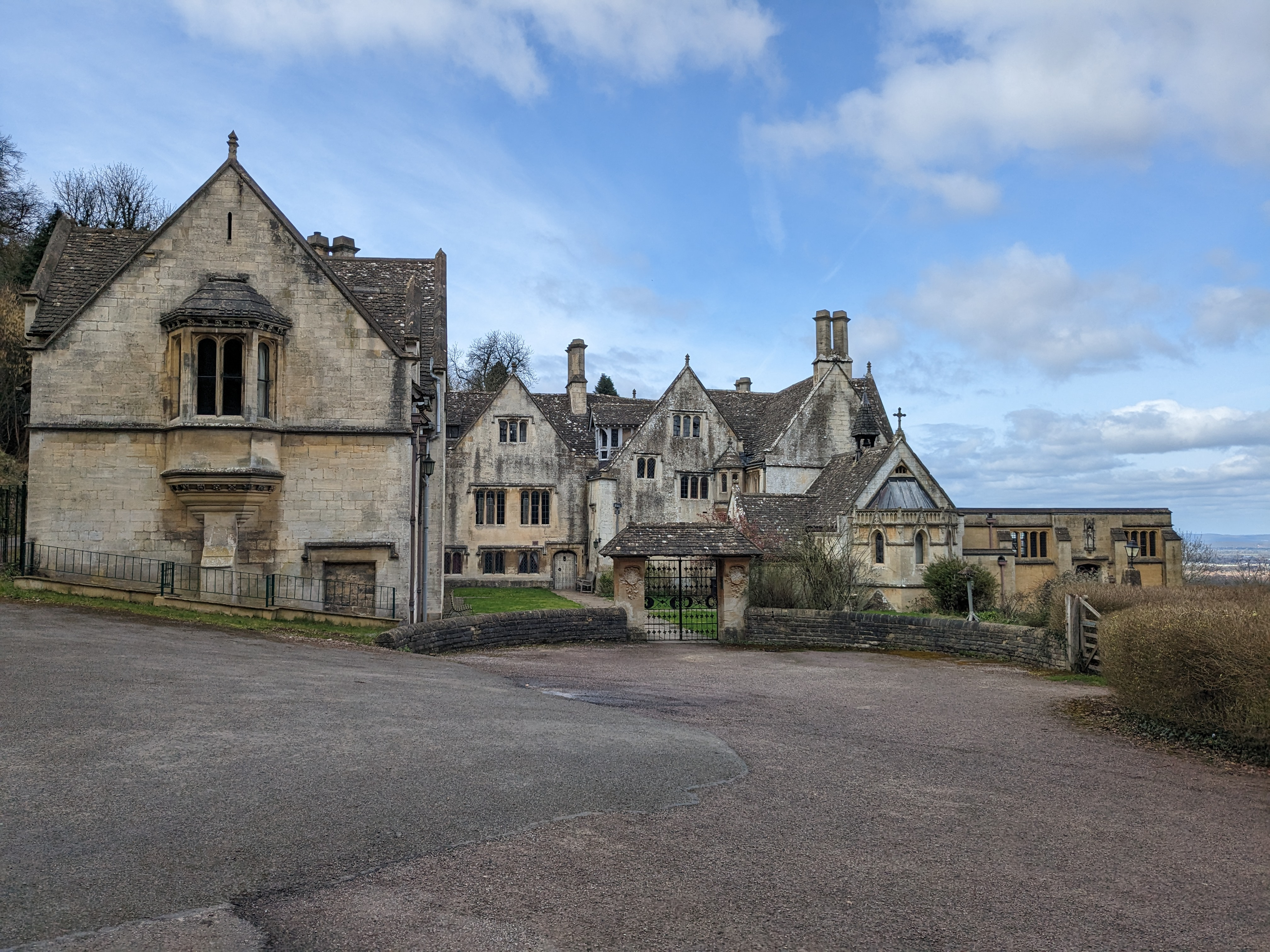
St Peter's Grange, Prinknash Park

For nearly 900 years the land known as Prinknash in the parish of Upton St Leonards has been associated with Benedictine monks. In 1096 the Giffard family, who had come to England with William the Conqueror, made a gift of the land to Serlo, Abbot of Gloucester. A large part of the present building was built as a hunting lodge during the abbacy of William Parker, the last Abbot of Gloucester, around the year 1520.

It remained in the abbey's hands until the dissolution of the monasteries in 1541 when it was rented from the Crown by Sir Anthony Kingston who was to provide 40 deer annually to King Henry VIII, who used the house as a hunting lodge. Prinknash Park continued to be used as a home for the gentry and nobility of Gloucestershire during the next few centuries and each generation left its mark on the property.

=== Recent history ===
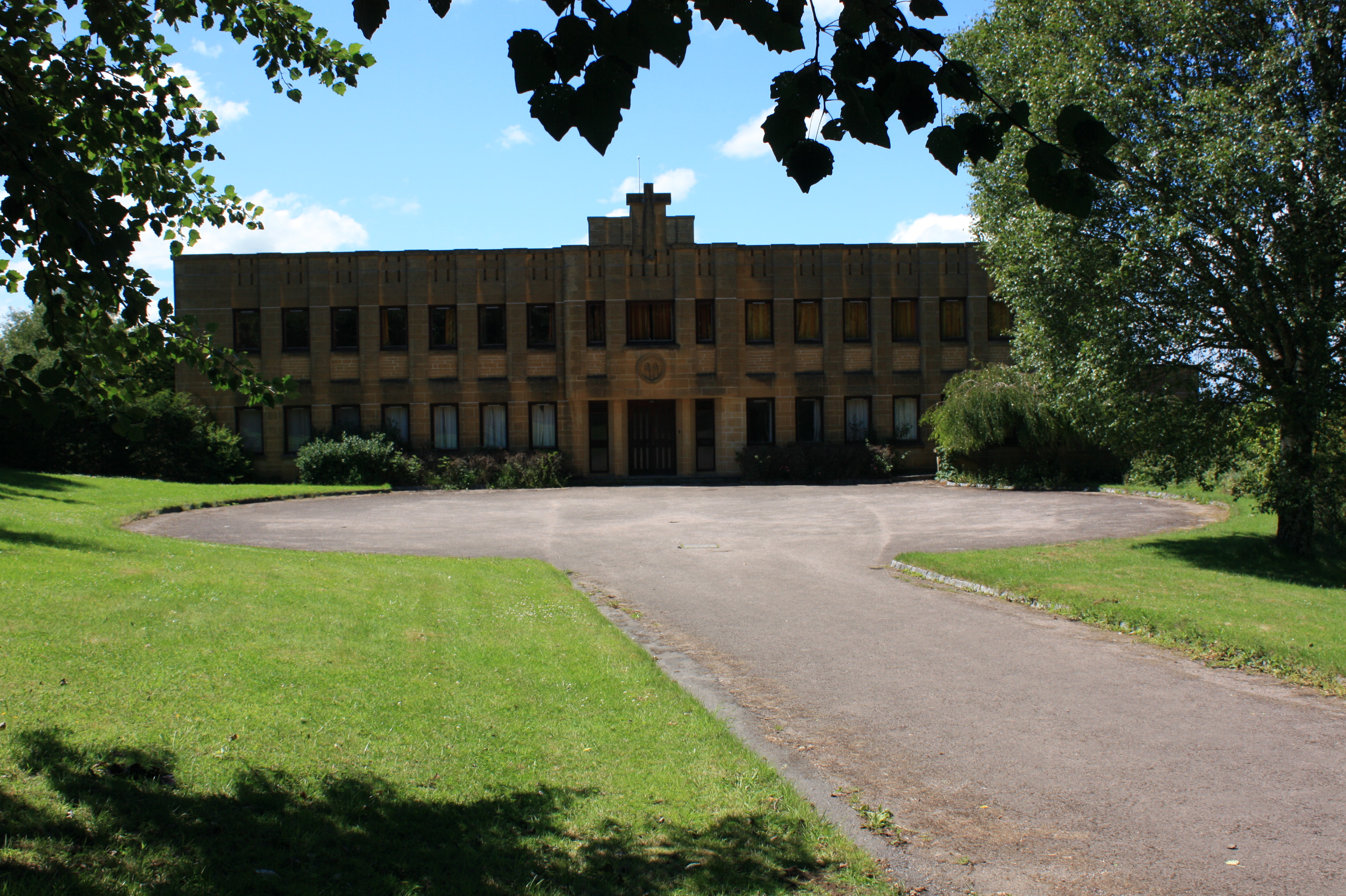
Prinknash Abbey

On 1 August 1928 a Deed of Covenant was made out by Malcolm Leslie, 20th Earl of Rothes, the grandson of Thomas Dyer Edwardes who had converted to Catholicism in old age, and whose wish was that Prinknash should be given to the Benedictine monks of Caldey Island. These monks had converted from Anglicanism to Roman Catholicism in 1913 under the leadership of Abbot Ælred Carlyle, although he left monastic life in 1921 to work as a missionary priest in Vancouver. Abbot Aelred returned to the community in 1950 and died in 1955.

Caldey Island was eventually sold to the Cistercian monks and on 26 October 1928 six Benedictine monks arrived from Caldey to convert the house at Prinknash into a monastery. The rest soon followed and after some years of poverty they managed to purchase all the land around the house to make Prinknash as it is today. Fr. Wilfrid Upson, who had been appointed Prior after Carlyle's departure, was elected the first Abbot of Prinknash in 1937.

The community continued to grow, beginning with 25 monks. In 1939 a foundation stone for a new abbey was laid at Prinknash by Cardinal Hinsley, but the Second World War intervened and the previous impracticable building plans were eventually redrawn by Frank Broadbent. In 1947, they refounded St Michael's Abbey, Farnborough, Hampshire, and in 1948, refounded Pluscarden Priory, Elgin, Moray, Scotland. The monks moved into the new abbey in 1972 and the old abbey was re-roofed, re-furnished, and converted into a retreat and conference centre, known as "St Peter's Grange". However, by 2008 the now smaller community of monks had decided to move back to St Peter's Grange, and this took place on the Feast of Saints Peter and Paul (30 June) in that same year. St Peter's Grange is a Grade I listed building.

== Prinknash Pottery ==
In the early 1940s, one of the monks, Dom Asaph Harris, made experiments with clay from the foundations of the new abbey. Other monks, especially Thomas Morey, took this up and after the Second World War , Prinknash Pottery was set up on a commercial basis. The pottery flourished for fifty years, then declined and closed in 2003. The pots (made with red clay from the foundations of the 1972 Abbey) are now collectable, and sometimes appear on the Antiques Roadshow.

The Cinema Museum holds film of the Abbey in 1967. HMO363

== Horarium ==
In addition to the daily canonical hours, the monks hear Mass at 8:30 am every day including Sunday. They no longer celebrate Mass in the Extraordinary Form.

== Art ==
In 1972–3, Brother Patrick, a monk of Prinknash, contributed the design and manufacture of a number of items at Clifton Cathedral, Bristol. These included the decorative screens to the Blessed Sacrament Chapel. Dom Sylvester Houédard, d. 1992 aged 67, was a concrete poet and theologian who specialised in inter-religious dialogue. His archive is kept by the John Rylands University of Manchester Library. Dom Stephen Horton, living, is a watercolourist and portrait painter, and a spiritual father to many people. He is also currently the Prior Administrator (i.e. the one who holds the place of Abbot or Major Superior) of the community until 10 June 2027.

== Notes ==
1. According to their website and their video about making incense:
