= Melangata Station =

Pastoral lease in Western Australia

- Location within Western Australia

General information
- Type: Station
- Location: 63 kilometres (39 mi) north of Yalgoo, Western Australia
- Coordinates: 27.803°S 116.885°E

Western Australia Heritage Register
- Designated: 30 October 1998
- Reference no.: 2785

Melangata Station is a pastoral lease that has operated as a goat transhipment location, as well as sheep station in Western Australia.

It is located 63 kilometres (39 mi) north of Yalgoo and 99 kilometres (62 mi) west of Mount Magnet in the Murchison area of the Mid West region of Western Australia. It was the only private property in Western Australia to have a John Hawes designed structure.

The pastoral lease and station of Melangata is smaller than its neighbours Jingemara Station (to the west), Dalgaranga Station (to the east), and Meka Station to the north, and has rougher country compared to the adjacent stations. Originally a sheep station it has been more recently a goat export receival station. The station is on the older Yalgoo to Cue track that was a route much more direct than rail connection between Yalgoo and Cue that travels to Mount Magnet.

It lies at the upper reaches of the Greenough River catchment (which drops to the west), and to the north of the Sanford river catchment.

On the northern border of the lease is a named feature Nooloojoo Hill.

A short road across the south west corner is known as "Melangata Road"; it links Yalgoo North Road with the Dalgaranga and Cue Dalgaranga roads.

Like most stations in the area it has its own airstrip, and because of its position maps of the area are named after the station.

Most of the leases surrounding Melangata were taken in the 1880s, but Melangata was not leased until 1897. C.C. Williamson acquired the property in 1915 and had the homestead commissioned in 1917.

The station was on sheep shearing lists as early as 1915, with a scheduled number of 2500 sheep to be shorn.

The Seaman family had a long interest in the station.

Melangata was sold in 2013 for A$475,000, the 45,122-hectare (111,499-acre) property was stocked with approximately 1,500 damaras at the time.

== Homestead ==
The John Hawes designed homestead was built in 1917 and is constructed of stone with a corrugated iron roof. It consists of six bedrooms, a large living area, an unusual turret and a chapel with altar.

The breezeways are without doors, allowing a constant flow of air throughout the structure. Another feature is the hand-painted pressed metal ceilings, similar to those at Noongal and Carlaminda Stations.

== See also ==
- List of pastoral leases in Western Australia
