= Mount Alvernia =

Highest point in the Bahamas

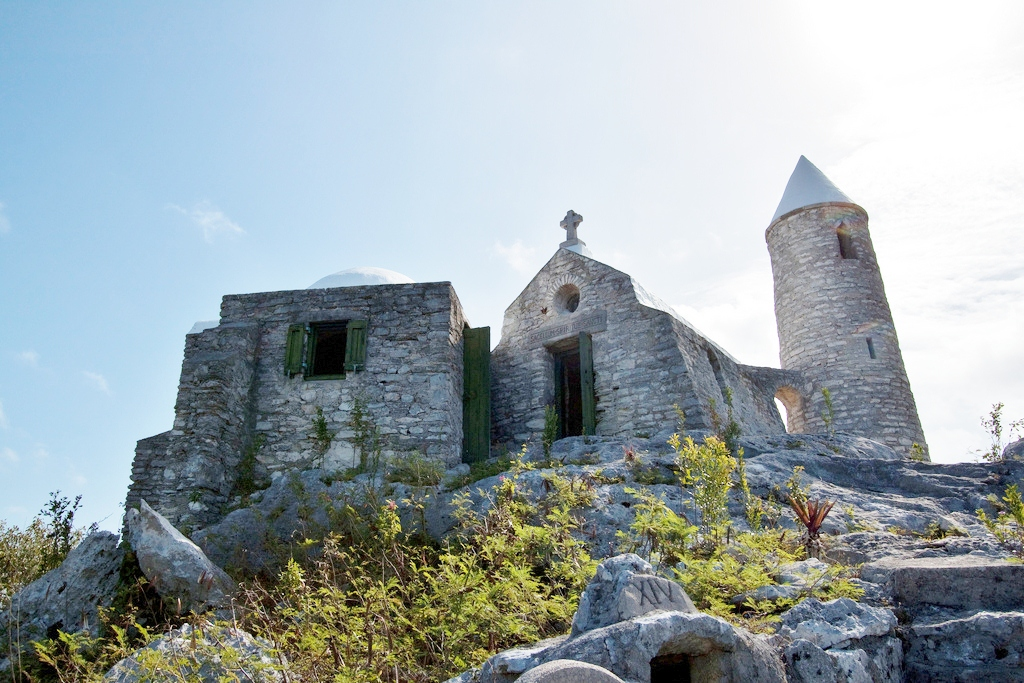
- The Hermitage on the summit of Mount Alvernia

Highest point
- Elevation: 63 m (207 ft)
- Prominence: 63 m (207 ft)
- Listing: Country high point
- Coordinates: 24°17′39″N 75°24′30″W

Geography
- Location within Bahamas
- Location: The Bahamas

Mount Alvernia is located on Cat Island in The Bahamas and is the highest point in the country at 63 metres (207 ft) above sea level. The mountain shares its name with a school in Montego Bay, Jamaica.

Originally named "Como Hill", it was renamed Mount Alvernia after La Verna (Latin: Alverna), the hill in Tuscany where Francis of Assisi received the stigmata. The mountain was given its name by a Catholic priest, Monsignor John Hawes, also known as Fra Jerome, who built a hermitage there. Hawes was an Englishman who spent the last 17 years of his life in the Bahamas. He was a qualified architect before entering the church, and known for designing and constructing church buildings in England, Western Australia and the Bahamas.
