= Caldey Island =

Island in Pembrokeshire, Wales

Coordinates: 51.64°N 4.69°W

Caldey Island: Welsh: Ynys Bŷr
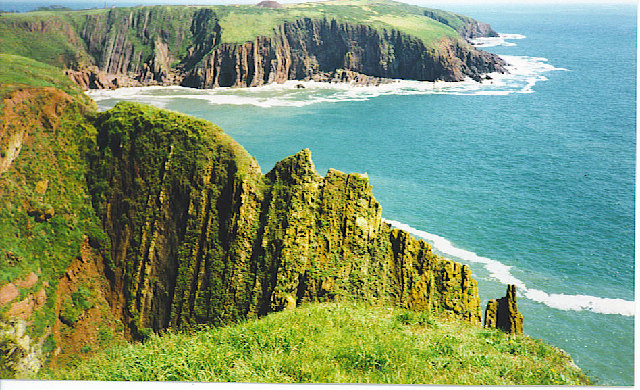
- The south coast of Caldey Island

- Location within Pembrokeshire
- Population: 40 (2011)
- Community: Tenby
- Principal area: Pembrokeshire
- Preserved county: Dyfed
- Country: Wales
- Sovereign state: United Kingdom
- Post town: TENBY
- Postcode district: SA70
- Dialling code: 01834
- Police: Dyfed-Powys
- Fire: Mid and West Wales
- Ambulance: Welsh
- Senedd Cymru – Welsh Parliament: Carmarthen West and South Pembrokeshire

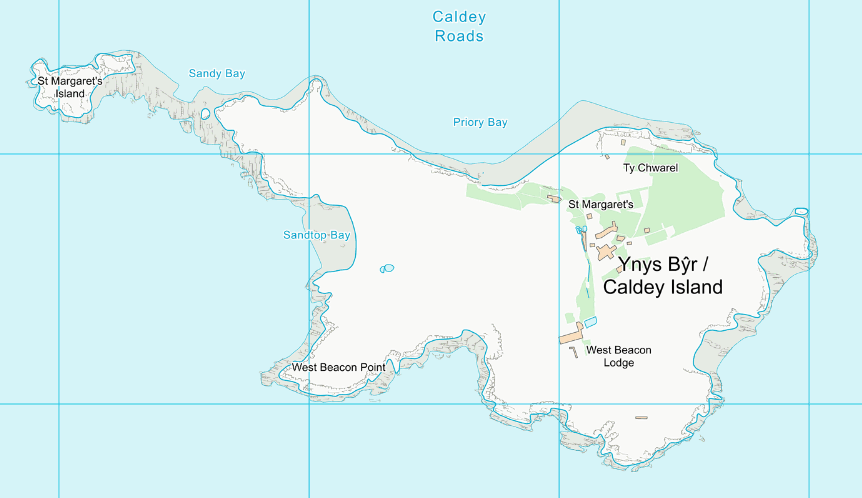
Map of Caldey Island

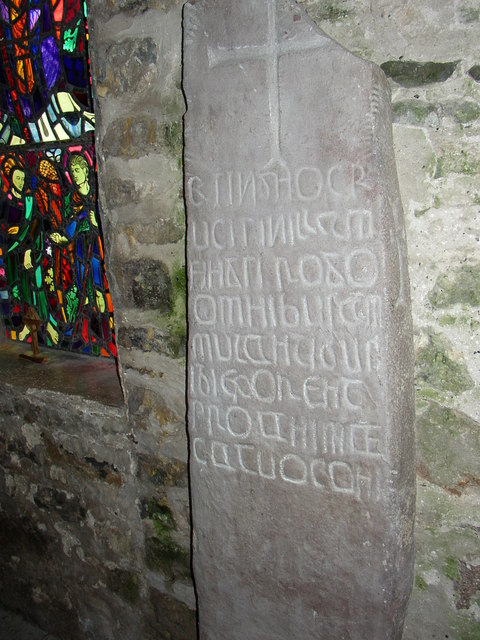
Caldey Ogham Stone, 6th century

Caldey Island Act 1990 (Note: Section 5.)
- Act of Parliament
- Parliament of the United Kingdom
- Long title: An Act to provide for the islands of Caldey and St. Margaret's in the county of Dyfed to be included in the district of South Pembrokeshire for the purposes of local, parliamentary and European elections and for the purposes of local taxation; to include those islands in the districts of the Pembrokeshire coroner and the Pembrokeshire Health Authority; and for connected purposes.
- Citation: 1990 c. 44
- Territorial extent: United Kingdom

Dates
- Royal assent: 1 November 1990
- Commencement: 1 November 1990 (Note: Section 4(b) of the Interpretation Act 1978.)
Other legislation
| Amended by | Local Government (Wales) Act 1994; Health Authorities Act 1995; Local Government Reorganisation (Wales) (Consequential Amendments) Order 1996; Electoral Administration Act 2006; Coroners and Justice Act 2009 |

Status: Partially repealed

Text of statute as originally enacted

Revised text of statute as amended

Text of the Caldey Island Act 1990 as in force today (including any amendments) within the United Kingdom, from legislation.gov.uk.

Caldey Island (Welsh: Ynys Bŷr) is a small island near Tenby, Pembrokeshire, Wales, less than 1 mile (1.6 km) off the coast. With a recorded history going back over 1,500 years, it is one of the holy islands of Britain. A number of traditions inherited from Celtic times are observed by the Cistercian monks of Caldey Abbey, the owners of the island.

The island's population consists of about 40 permanent residents and a varying number of Cistercian monks, known as Trappists. The monks' predecessors migrated there from Belgium in the early 20th century, taking over from Anglican Benedictines who had bought the island in 1906 and built the extant monastery and abbey but later got into financial difficulties. Today, the monks of Caldey Abbey rely on tourism and making perfumes and chocolate.

The usual access to the island is by boat from Tenby Harbour, 2.5 miles (4.0 km) to the north. In the spring and summer, visitors are ferried to Caldey, not only to visit the sacred sanctuary but also to view the island's rich wildlife. Following a rat eradication programme, red squirrels were introduced in 2016. Alongside rare breed sheep and cattle, the island has a diverse bird and plant life.

== Name origins ==
The island was named Ynys Bŷr after Saint Pyr, the 6th-century saint, and Pyr is named as abbot of the monastery around the year 500 in the Life of St Samson. This Welsh name has remained in use since medieval times, but the Old Welsh name of the island before St Pyr's day is unknown.

Like those of many Welsh islands, Caldey's English name (sometimes spelled Caldy) derives from the Vikings. Kald ey translates as "cold island", with the name appearing as 'Caldea' in the early 12th century, and Kaldey or Caldey by 1291. On an Ordnance Survey map revised in 1948 it appears as Caldy Island. This OS spelling was revised to Caldey Island by 1982.

== History ==
=== Pre-history ===
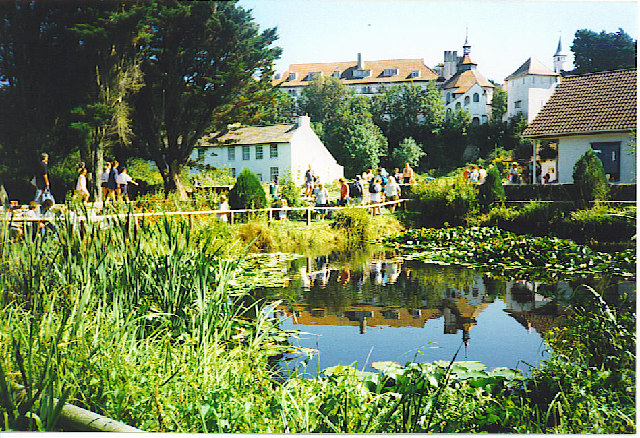
Caldey Island monastery, reflected in the pond

Three caves have been discovered on the island and excavated to unearth archaeological finds: Nanna's Cave, Potter's Cave (1950) and Ogof-yr-Ychen ("Ox cave", 1970). In Nanna's Cave, human bones and shells were first found in 1911 and excavations continued in three more stages until the 1970s. Potter's Cave was found in 1950 by a monk named James Van Nedervelde, and excavations, which continued until 1970, initially revealed stalagmites in which tools and animals were embedded. After removal of these finds, three human skeletons were found and carbon dated: two were dated to the Middle Stone Age and one to the Romano–British period. Also found were a few artefacts from the late Upper Paleolithic period. In Ogof–yr-Ychen, the bones of humans whose burials date between 7590 BC and 5710 BC were found. Stable isotope ratio tests revealed that they lived on marine food. A very few earlier neolithic bowls and shells have also been found in the caves. All the finds were carbon dated and have been preserved in the Abbey of Caldey Island or in Tenby Museum and Art Gallery.

=== Recorded history ===
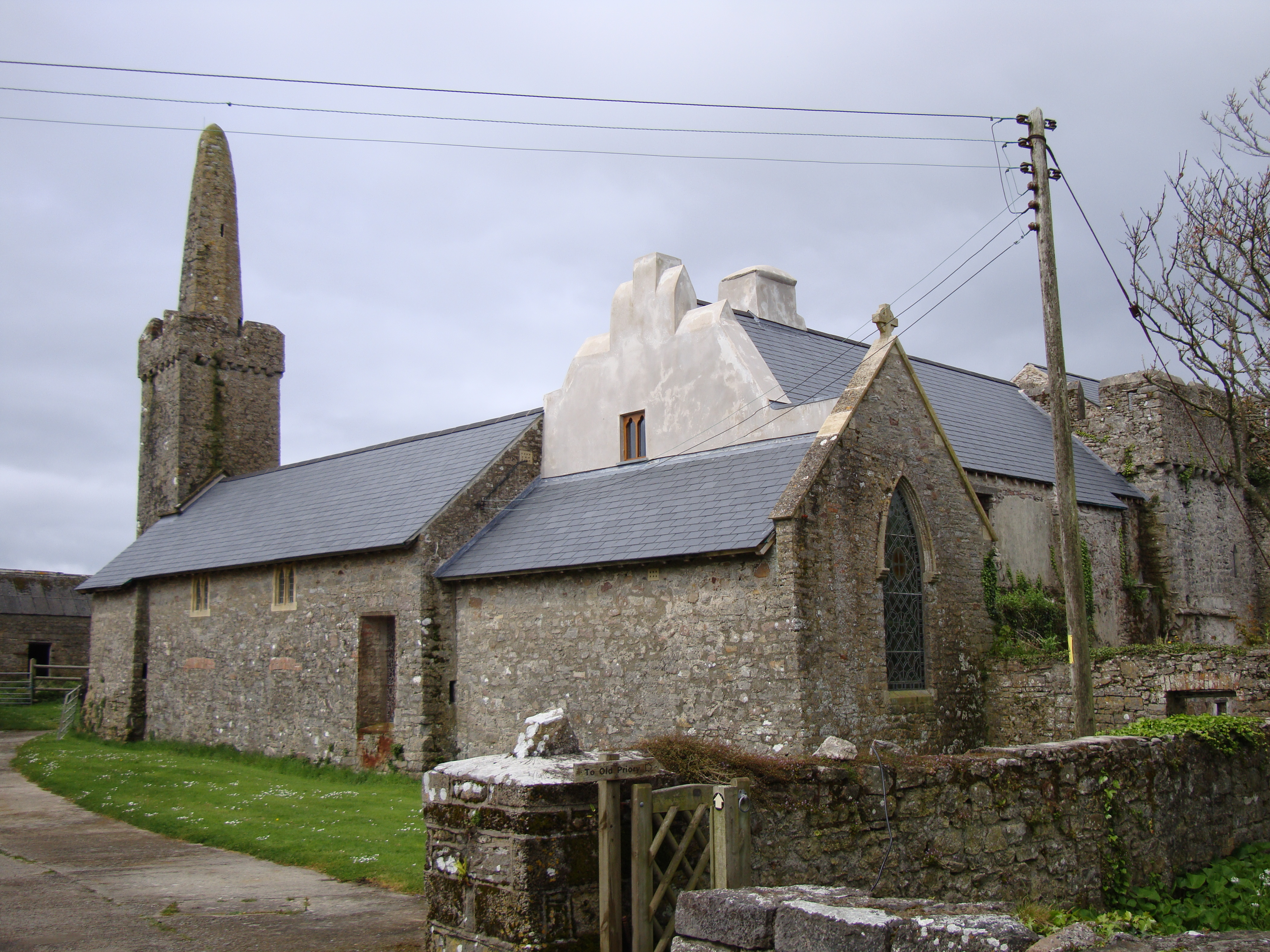
Caldey Island Priory

A Celtic monastery was first established on the island in the 6th century, and the island thrived during the Middle Ages. Following the Norman Conquest, Robert fitz Martin, Lord of Cemais, gave the island to his mother Geva. In the 12th century, Caldey Priory (now a Grade I listed building) was established by Tironensian monks as a daughter house of St Dogmaels Abbey, and lasted to the dissolution of the monasteries in 1536.

The north side of Caldey Island is made up of grey limestone, a desirable building material. The 19th century seems to have been the height of limestone quarrying on the island; some of the limestone was taken to the Annery kiln in the district of Torridge in north Devon for processing.

The current abbey was built in 1910 by Anglican Benedictine monks but financial problems beginning in 1925 led to the 1929 purchase of the property by Belgian Cistercians. It is considered to be the most complete example of the Arts and Crafts style in the country, and was the largest project of John Coates Carter. At the time of building, the abbey was called "the greatest phenomenon in the Anglican community at the present time". The roofs are of white roughcast with red tiling, and the abbey church has five side-windows and on the south a "tapering" tower with primitive crenellations.

Caldey Island and St Margaret’s Island have together formed an ecclesiastical district for as long as the locals can remember, with 20 Cistercian monks living at the monastery as of 2007. The Census Reports of the County of Pembroke record it as an ecclesiastical district for administrative purposes.

The Caldey Island Act 1990 added the island to Dyfed and South Pembrokeshire, and to Pembrokeshire parliamentary constituency.

=== Child sexual abuse ===
There have been many cases involving child sexual abuse linked to the island, over more than fifty years. Father Thaddeus Kotik was found to have sexually abused six girls on the island between 1972 and 1987 in a 2017 civil court case. In 2011 a fugitive charged with possessing indecent images of children was arrested at the abbey after living there for seven years. Two other men, Father John Shannon and John Cronin, convicted of sexual offences involving children have also been linked to Caldey Island. In 2017 Welsh Conservatives children's spokesman, Darren Millar, called for an independent inquiry into historical child sexual abuse on the island. In April 2024 Caldey Abbey commissioned an independent review into the historical child sexual abuse, led by leading social worker and former assistant police and crime commissioner at South Wales Police, Jan Pickles OBE, which was completed, and published in December 2024. The island now works with The Catholic Safeguarding Standards Agency (CSSA), and has appointed a safeguarding officer to ensure such events are not allowed to repeat and ensure the island is safe for visitors in the present and future.

In December 2024, the abbot, Father Jan Rossey, apologised for the abuse and its cover-up. Monks have agreed to a 'no touch' policy for visitors and will report any accidental physical contact, as recommended by the independent review.

== Geography ==
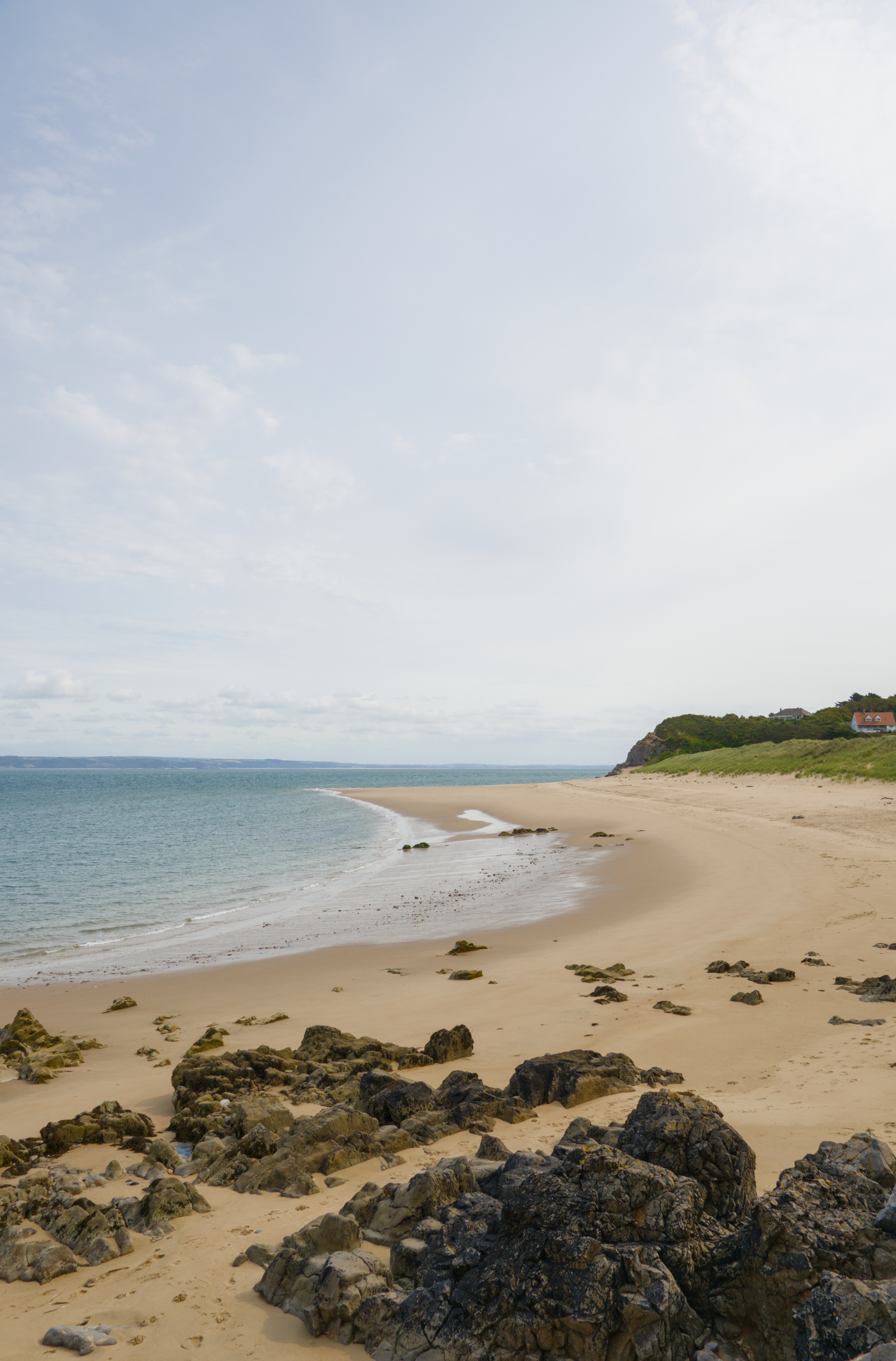
Priory Bay features a sandy beach.

Caldey Island is about 1.5 miles (2.4 km) long and 1 mile (1.6 km) in width at its widest. It has an area of 538 acres (2.18 km^{2}) and its highest elevation is 197 feet (60 m). The island lies in Carmarthen Bay on the northern side of the Bristol Channel in the county of Pembrokeshire, a little over 2.5 miles (4 km) south of Tenby on the mainland of southwest Wales. It is separated from the mainland by Caldey Sound. A fleet of traditional wooden boats ferry passengers from Tenby to Caldey Island in the spring and summer months when the weather allows. Boats depart roughly every twenty minutes from the harbour at high tide, while at low tide they depart from Castle Beach.

Caldey Island consists of two islands which are separated at high tide: Caldey Island and Little Caldey Island. Little Caldey Island is also known as St Margaret's Island or St Margaret's Isle, and lies off the north-western point of Caldey Island. It acquired its name in the 17th century, and is known for its seals and bird sanctuary.

The island is mostly used for grazing.

=== Climate ===
The average high and low temperatures for Caldey Island, along with wind speeds for each month of the year, are given in the following table. The absolute maximum temperature recorded is 33 °C (91 °F) in August and the absolute minimum recorded is −9 °C (16 °F) in February.

Climate data for Caldey Island, Wales
| Month | Jan | Feb | Mar | Apr | May | Jun | Jul | Aug | Sep | Oct | Nov | Dec | Year |
|---|---|---|---|---|---|---|---|---|---|---|---|---|---|
| Mean daily maximum °C (°F) | 8 (46) | 8 (46) | 10 (50) | 12 (54) | 15 (59) | 17 (63) | 20 (68) | 20 (68) | 17 (63) | 14 (57) | 11 (52) | 8 (46) | 20 (68) |
| Mean daily minimum °C (°F) | 3 (37) | 3 (37) | 5 (41) | 5 (41) | 8 (46) | 10 (50) | 13 (55) | 12 (54) | 10 (50) | 8 (46) | 5 (41) | 3 (37) | 3 (37) |
Source: Weatherbase Retrieved on 5 June 2013

Maximum Recorded Wind Speed
| Jan | Feb | Mar | Apr | May | Jun | Jul | Aug | Sep | Oct | Nov | Dec |
|---|---|---|---|---|---|---|---|---|---|---|---|
| 65 km/h | 59 km/h | 59 km/h | 59 km/h | 56 km/h | 48 km/h | 43 km/h | 46 km/h | 44 km/h | 67 km/h | 61 km/h | 61 km/h |
| 40 mph | 37 mph | 37 mph | 37 mph | 35 mph | 30 mph | 27 mph | 29 mph | 27 mph | 42 mph | 38 mph | 38 mph |

=== Wildlife ===
Caldey Island is known for its flowers, many of which are rarely found in other areas of the United Kingdom. The island also has many species of birds that are prevalent in the summer months. The country's largest colony of cormorants is located at St Margaret's Island. Following a two-year rat eradication programme, red squirrels were introduced in 2016 and by 2018 were breeding successfully and there are now around 50 on the island.

== Economy and services ==
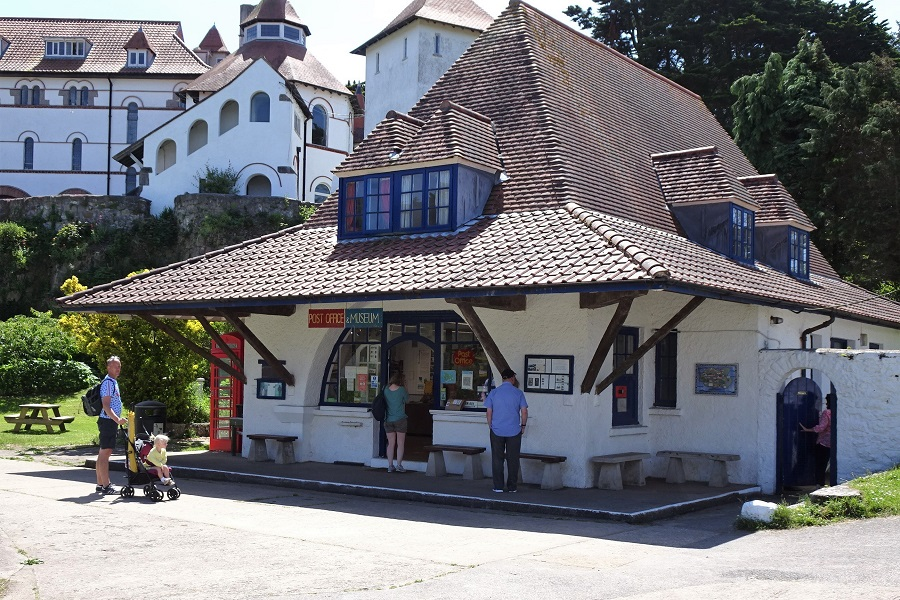
Caldey Post Office and Museum

The island's economic activity is supported by tourism and the sale of chocolate. The main income comes from tourism. The monastery opened an Internet shop in 2001 to sell products online. Their lavender perfume is said to be "simply the best lavender soliflore on earth" by the perfume critic Luca Turin.

Caldey Island provides a spiritual retreat that accommodates up to 750 guests a year. This facility is currently undergoing an extensive refurbishment and is due to be open again in Easter 2024. The island has a functioning post office including a museum of the island's history. The island has its own postage stamps and its own monetary unit named after the local fish, the dab. There is a colonial-style tea shop on the green, and an underground reservoir near the lighthouse, supplied by a spring. This provides water to the gardens and the people.

For handling emergencies, the island Land Rover is shared between the fire service, the coastguard, and the police. There is a volunteer fire service operated by the Mid and West Wales Fire and Rescue Service, with access to two fire engines, one being a 4x4 rural firefighting unit that was airlifted to the island by the Royal Air Force. The last reported major fire on the island was in 1940 when the monastery was damaged.

The island has two cranes, one on Tenby Harbour the other on the island. These cranes are used to lift heavier items or livestock onto the boat to be transported to and from the island.

The island also has some basic farming equipment including two tractors, used for the upkeep of the land and transportation of heavy goods.

== Landmarks ==
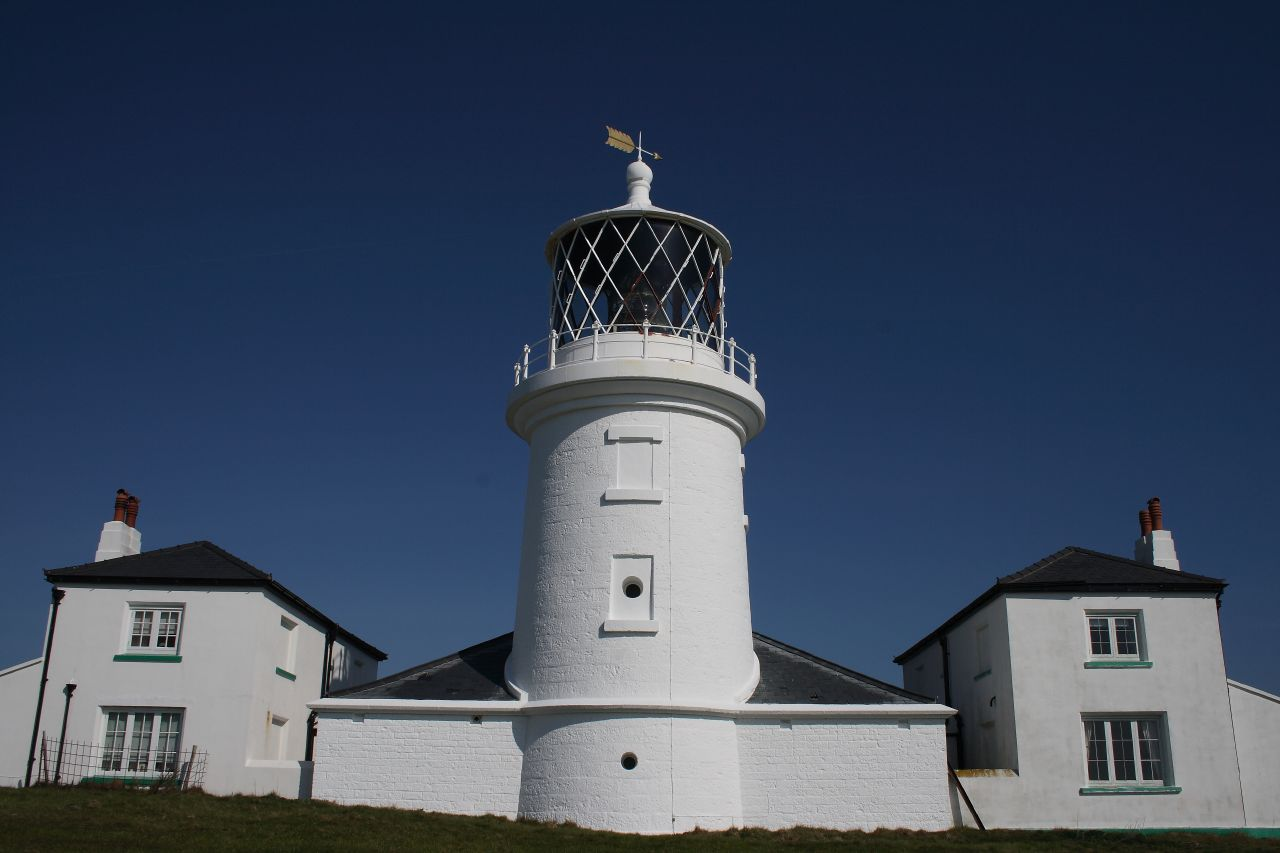
Caldey Lighthouse

Tourist attractions on Caldey Island include the recently restored 13th-century church of St Illtyd, an ogham cross from the 6th century, a Norman chapel, and Caldey Abbey, completed in 1910.

Caldey Lighthouse was built in 1829. The light was intended to help coastal traffic trading limestone and coal to mid- and North Wales but the light also helped long-distance and North American traffic identify the Bristol Channel and avoid confusion with the English Channel. The lighthouse is a squat, round, brick-lined limestone tower of 17 m (56 ft), with walls 0.9 m (3 ft) thick at the base and 2 ft 6 in (0.76 m) thick at the top. The light stands 64 m (210 ft) above high-water mark. The lighthouse was automated in 1929. The former oil store for the lighthouse is a listed structure. The lighthouse keeper's cottages that flank the lighthouse are two-storey, with hipped roofs, octagonal chimneys and a one-storey linking corridor. The cottages were built around 1868–70 by T. C. Harvey.

== Bibliography ==
- Atkinson, David; Wilson, Neil (2007). Wales. Lonely Planet. p. 167. ISBN 978-1-74104-538-3.
- Burrow, Stephen (2003). Catalogue of the Mesolithic and Neolithic Collections at the National Museums and Galleries of Wales. National Museum Wales. ISBN 978-0-7200-0516-5.
- Hastings, Adrian (2000). A World History of Christianity. Wm. B. Eerdmans Publishing. ISBN 978-0-8028-4875-8.
- Heath, Robin F.; Michell, John F. (2006). The Lost Science of Measuring the Earth: Discovering the Sacred Geometry of the Ancients. Adventures Unlimited Press. ISBN 978-1-931882-50-7.
- Hughes, Basil H.J. (2014). "Pembrokeshire Parishes, Places & People. Castlemartin Hundred". archive.org. pp. 877–893.
- Huntington, Father (1908). "The Benedictine Revival in the Church of England II: The Benedictines of Caldey Island". The Churchman: 323.
- Manwaring, Kevan (2008). Lost islands: inventing Avalon, destroying Eden. Heart of Albion. ISBN 978-1-905646-07-4.
- Royal, Commission on the Ancient and Historical Monuments of Wales (1977). An Inventory of the Ancient Monuments of Wales and Monmouthshire: VII - County of Pembroke. HMSO. OCLC 220312341.
- Williams, David H. (2001). The Welsh Cistercians: Written to Commemorate the Centenary of the Death of Stephen William Williams (1837-1899), the Father of Cistercian Archaeology in Wales. Gracewing Publishing. ISBN 978-0-85244-354-5.
