= Acacia graciliformis =

Conservation status
- Priority One — Poorly Known Taxa (DEC)

Scientific classification
- Kingdom: Plantae
- Clade: Tracheophytes
- Clade: Angiosperms
- Clade: Eudicots
- Clade: Rosids
- Order: Fabales
- Family: Fabaceae
- Subfamily: Caesalpinioideae
- Clade: Mimosoid clade
- Genus: Acacia
- Species: A. graciliformis

Binomial name
- Acacia graciliformis Buscumb & Maslin

Species of legume

Acacia graciliformis, also known as Koolanooka delicate wattle, is a species of flowering plant in the family Fabaceae and is endemic to a small area in the south-west of Western Australia. It is an openly branched, spreading shrub with slender, contorted stems, terete, sharply pointed, rigid phyllodes on raised stem-projections, spherical heads of light golden yellow flowers and firmly papery, narrowly oblong to linear, curved pods.

== Description ==
Acacia graciliformis is an openly branched, spreading shrub that typically grows to a height of 1–2 m (3 ft 3 in – 6 ft 7 in) and has slender and more or less contorted stems. Its branchlets have soft hairs pressed against the surface at first, later glabrous. The phyllodes are curved, terete, 7–25 mm (0.28–0.98 in) long, 0.7–1 mm (0.028–0.039 in) wide on raised stem projections, rigid and sharply pointed wih nine or ten longitudinal veins. The flowers are borne in one or two small spherical heads in axils on a glabrous peduncle 3–5 mm (0.12–0.20 in) long, the heads 3–4 mm (0.12–0.16 in) in diameter with 11 to 18 light golden yellow flowers. The pods and narrowly oblong to linear and curved, sometimes circular or coiled, 35–65 mm (1.4–2.6 in) long and 3.0–3.5 mm (0.12–0.14 in) wide and firmly papery. Flowering occurs from August to October, and the seeds or oblong to elliptic, about 3 mm (0.12 in) long and glossy dark brown with a white aril.

== Taxonomy ==
Acacia graciliformis was first formally described in 2007 by the botanists Bruce Maslin and Carrie Buscumb in the journal Nuytsia from specimens collected by Maslin in the Koolanooka Hills east of Morawa in 2006. The specific epithet (graciliformis) means 'thin-shaped', referring to the slender phyllodes.

== Distribution and habitat ==
Koolanooka delicate wattle grows in clay loam on the slopes and crests of low banded ironstone in the Koolanooka Hills and in the Perenjori Hills 10 km (6.2 mi) further south-east in the Avon Wheatbelt bioregion of south-western Western Australia.

== Conservation status ==
Acacia graciliformis is listed as "Priority One" by the Government of Western Australia Department of Biodiversity, Conservation and Attractions, meaning that it is known from only one or a few locations that are potentially at risk.

== See also ==
- List of Acacia species
