= Acacia muriculata =

Koolanooka wattle

Conservation status
- Priority One — Poorly Known Taxa (DEC)

Scientific classification
- Kingdom: Plantae
- Clade: Tracheophytes
- Clade: Angiosperms
- Clade: Eudicots
- Clade: Rosids
- Order: Fabales
- Family: Fabaceae
- Subfamily: Caesalpinioideae
- Clade: Mimosoid clade
- Genus: Acacia
- Species: A. muriculata

Binomial name
- Acacia muriculata Maslin & Buscumb

Species of legume

Acacia muriculata, commonly known as Koolanooka wattle, is a species of flowering plant in the family Fabaceae, and is endemic to a small area in the south-west of Western Australia. It is an intricately branched shrub with many stems, ribbed branchlets, wide spreading, mostly narrowly oblong to oblong, leathery phyllodes, spherical heads of light golden yellow flowers. The pods and seeds have not been seen.

== Description ==
Acacia muriculata is an intricately branched, inverted cone-shaped shrub with warty-ribbed branchlets, that typically grows to a height of 1–2 m (3 ft 3 in – 6 ft 7 in) and has red or dull brown new shoots tinged with maroon. Its phyllodes are rather wide spreading, mostly narrowly oblong to oblong, sometimes with a few that are convex on one edge and straight on the other, 25–45 mm (0.98–1.77 in) long, 6–10 mm (0.24–0.39 in) wide and leathery with a prominent mid vein and marginal veins. There are stipules 2–4 mm (0.079–0.157 in) long at the base of the phyllodes, but often only the hardened bases persisting at mature nodes. The flowers are borne in one or two spherical heads on peduncles 10–18 mm (0.39–0.71 in) long, each head with 26 to 50 light golden yellow flowers. The pods and seeds have not been observed.

== Taxonomy ==
Acacia muriculata was first formally described in 2007 by Bruce Maslin and Carrie Buscumb in the journal Nuytsia from specimens collected by Maslin in the Koolanooka Hills in 2006. The specific epithet (muriculata) means 'slightly roughened', referring to the edges of the phyllodes.

== Distribution and habitat ==
Koolanooka wattle grows in loam on the slopes of low laterised banded ironstone hills in mallee shrubland, and is only known from east of Morawa in scattered populations at Koolanooka Hills in the Avon Wheatbelt bioregion of south-western Western Australia.

== Conservation status ==
Acacia muriculata is listed as 'Priority One' by the Government of Western Australia Department of Biodiversity, Conservation and Attractions, meaning that it is known from only one or a few locations where it is potentially at risk.

== See also ==
- List of Acacia species
