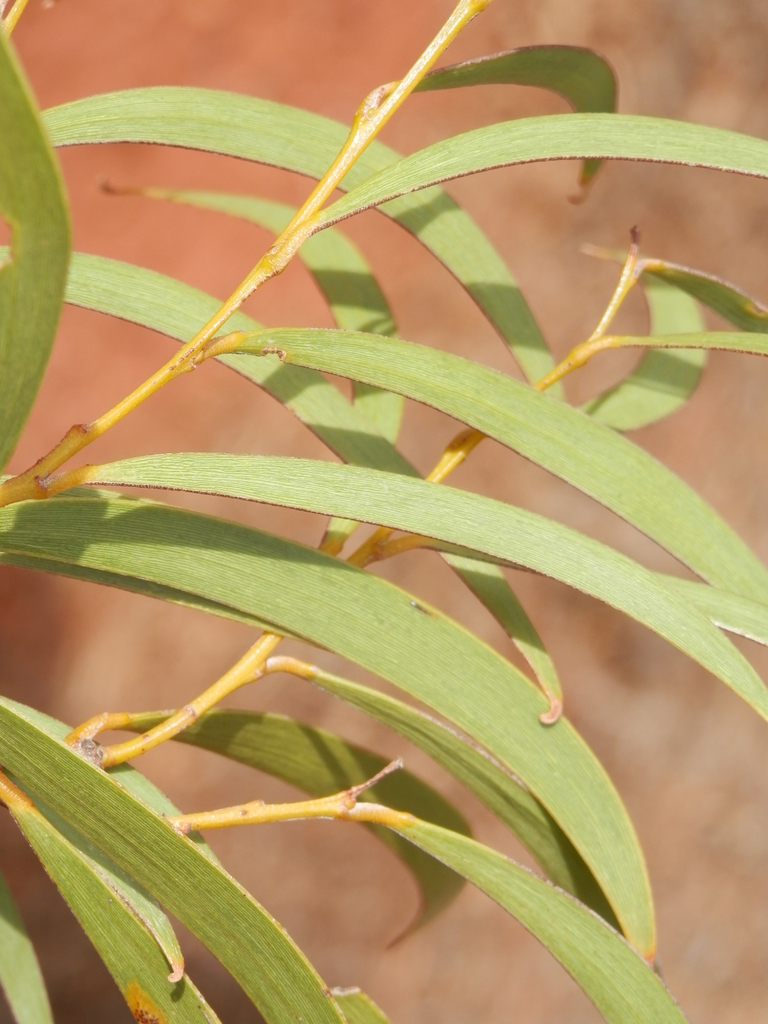
- Foliage, near the Karara mine

Scientific classification
- Kingdom: Plantae
- Clade: Embryophytes
- Clade: Tracheophytes
- Clade: Spermatophytes
- Clade: Angiosperms
- Clade: Eudicots
- Clade: Rosids
- Order: Fabales
- Family: Fabaceae
- Subfamily: Caesalpinioideae
- Clade: Mimosoid clade
- Genus: Acacia
- Species: A. umbraculiformis

Binomial name
- Acacia umbraculiformis Maslin & Buscumb
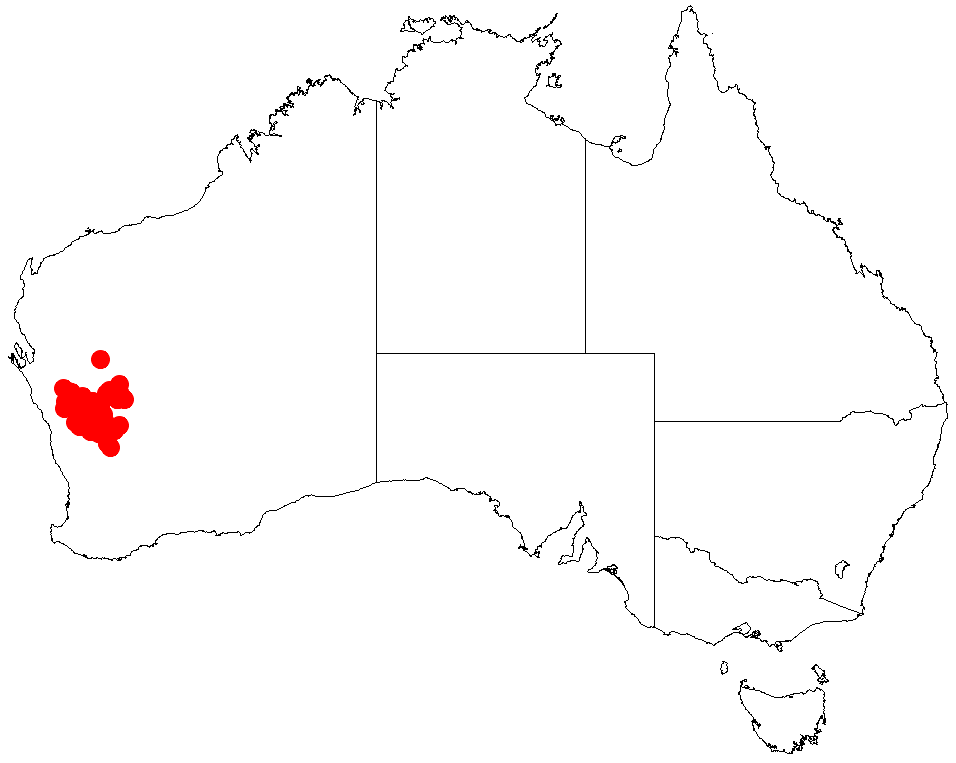
- Occurrence data from AVH

= Acacia umbraculiformis =

Western umbrella wattle

Species of legume

Acacia umbraculiformis, commonly known as western umbrella wattle, is a tree belonging to the genus Acacia and the subgenus Juliflorae native to western Australia.

== Description ==
The tree typically grows to a height of 3 to 7 m (9.8 to 23.0 ft) and has an obconic habit with a flat-topped crown. It has glabrous branchlets with resinous new shoots. Like most species of Acacia it has phyllodes rather than true leaves. The shiny dark green, wide-spreading phyllodes have a linear to narrowly elliptic shape, are slightly curved, and have a length of 5 to 11 cm (2.0 to 4.3 in), a width of 2 to 7.5 mm (0.079 to 0.295 in), and are glabrous with a normally curved tip with many, fine longitudinal nerves along with a more prominent central nerve. When it blooms it produces simple inflorescences that occur in groups of one to four in the axils on 2 to 8 mm (0.079 to 0.315 in) long stalks. The flower-heads can be obloid spherical to cylindrical in shape with a length of 3 to 10 mm (0.12 to 0.39 in) with golden flowers. The dark brown to black, firmly coriaceous-crustaceous to sub-woody seed pods that form after flowering have a narrowly oblong to linear shape or occasionally resemble as string of beads. They can be straight to prominently curved and have a length of 5 to 16 mm (0.20 to 0.63 in) and a width of 6 to 9 mm (0.24 to 0.35 in) with a discrete yellow to light brown coloured marginal nerve that is thickened. The longitudinally arranged dark brown to black coloured seeds have an oblong to elliptic shape and are quite flattened. They have a length of 5 to 10 mm (0.20 to 0.39 in) and a width of 5 to 7 mm (0.20 to 0.28 in) with a small cream to orange coloured aril.

== Distribution ==
It is native to an area in the Mid West, northern Wheatbelt and Goldfields regions of Western Australia. The bulk of the population is found from around Cue and Mount Magnet in the north down to around Koorda in the south and to around Morawa in the west. An isolated population is also known further north around Meekatharra. It is often situated on slopes and hill crests usually over granite or occasionally ironstone as a part of Acacia woodland or shrubland communities.

== See also ==
- List of Acacia species
