= List of State Register of Heritage Places in the Shire of Morawa =

List of heritage sites in Western Australia

The State Register of Heritage Places is maintained by the Heritage Council of Western Australia. As of 2026, 54 places are heritage-listed in the Shire of Morawa, of which six are on the State Register of Heritage Places.

== List ==
The Western Australian State Register of Heritage Places, as of 2026, lists the following six state registered places within the Shire of Morawa:

Place name	Place #	Street number	Street name	Suburb or town	Co-ordinates	Notes & former names	Photo
Church of the Holy Cross & Priest's Cell	1612	45	Gill Street	Morawa	29.21186°S 116.00729°E		
Morawa Shire Office & Town Hall	1620	38	Prater Street	Morawa	29.210932°S 116.007558°E		
Church of the Holy Cross	24866	45	Gill Street	Morawa	29.211936°S 116.007604°E		
Priest's Cell	24867	45	Gill Street	Morawa	29.211882°S 116.007136°E		
Morawa Shire Offices	24868	38	Prater Street	Morawa	29.210932°S 116.007558°E		
Morawa Town Hall & Lesser Hall	24873	38	Prater Street	Morawa	29.210932°S 116.007558°E		
