= Pimelea villifera =

Scientific classification
- Kingdom: Plantae
- Clade: Tracheophytes
- Clade: Angiosperms
- Clade: Eudicots
- Clade: Rosids
- Order: Malvales
- Family: Thymelaeaceae
- Genus: Pimelea
- Species: P. villifera

Binomial name
- Pimelea villifera Meisn.

Synonyms
- Banksia villifera (Meisn.) Kuntze nom. illeg.; Calyptrostegia villifera (Meisn.) Walp.; Pimelea imbricata var. villifera (Meisn.) Domin

Species of shrub

Pimelea villifera is a species of flowering plant in the family Thymelaeaceae and is endemic to the south-west of Western Australia. It is an erect, dense shrub usually with linear to narrowly elliptic leaves arranged in opposite pairs, and compact heads of many white flowers usually surrounded by 6 to 10 pairs of green and yellowish, narrowly egg-shaped involucral bracts.

== Description ==
Pimelea villifera is an erect, dense shrub that typically grows to a height of 0.2–1 m (7.9 in – 3 ft 3.4 in) and has hairy young stems and a single stem at ground level. The leaves are arranged in opposite pairs, linear to narrowly elliptic, 6–21 mm (0.24–0.83 in) long and 0.8–4 mm (0.031–0.157 in) wide on a short petiole. The flowers are bisexual, arranged in erect, compact heads, surrounded by 6 to 10 pairs of narrowly egg-shaped, green and yellowish involucral bracts 5–18 mm (0.20–0.71 in) long and 1.0–3.5 mm (0.039–0.138 in) wide. Each flower is on a hairy pedicel 0.1–0.2 mm (0.0039–0.0079 in) long, the flower tube 3.5–7 mm (0.14–0.28 in) long, the sepals 1.5–3.5 mm (0.059–0.138 in) long, the stamens longer than the sepals. Flowering occurs mainly from November to February.

== Taxonomy ==
Pimelea villifera was first formally described in 1848 by Carl Meissner in Lehmann's Plantae Preissianae from specimens collected near the Swan River by James Drummond. The specific epithet (villifera) means "bearing shaggy or woolly hair".

== Distribution and habitat ==
This pimelea grows in sand near the coast but in laterite on ranges further inland, and in sand in areas still further inland. It occurs from north of Morawa to near Jurien Bay and inland to Tammin in the Avon Wheatbelt, Geraldton Sandplains, Jarrah Forest and Swan Coastal Plain bioregions of south-western Western Australia.

== Conservation status ==
Pimelea villifera is listed as "not threatened" by the Government of Western Australia Department of Biodiversity, Conservation and Attractions.
