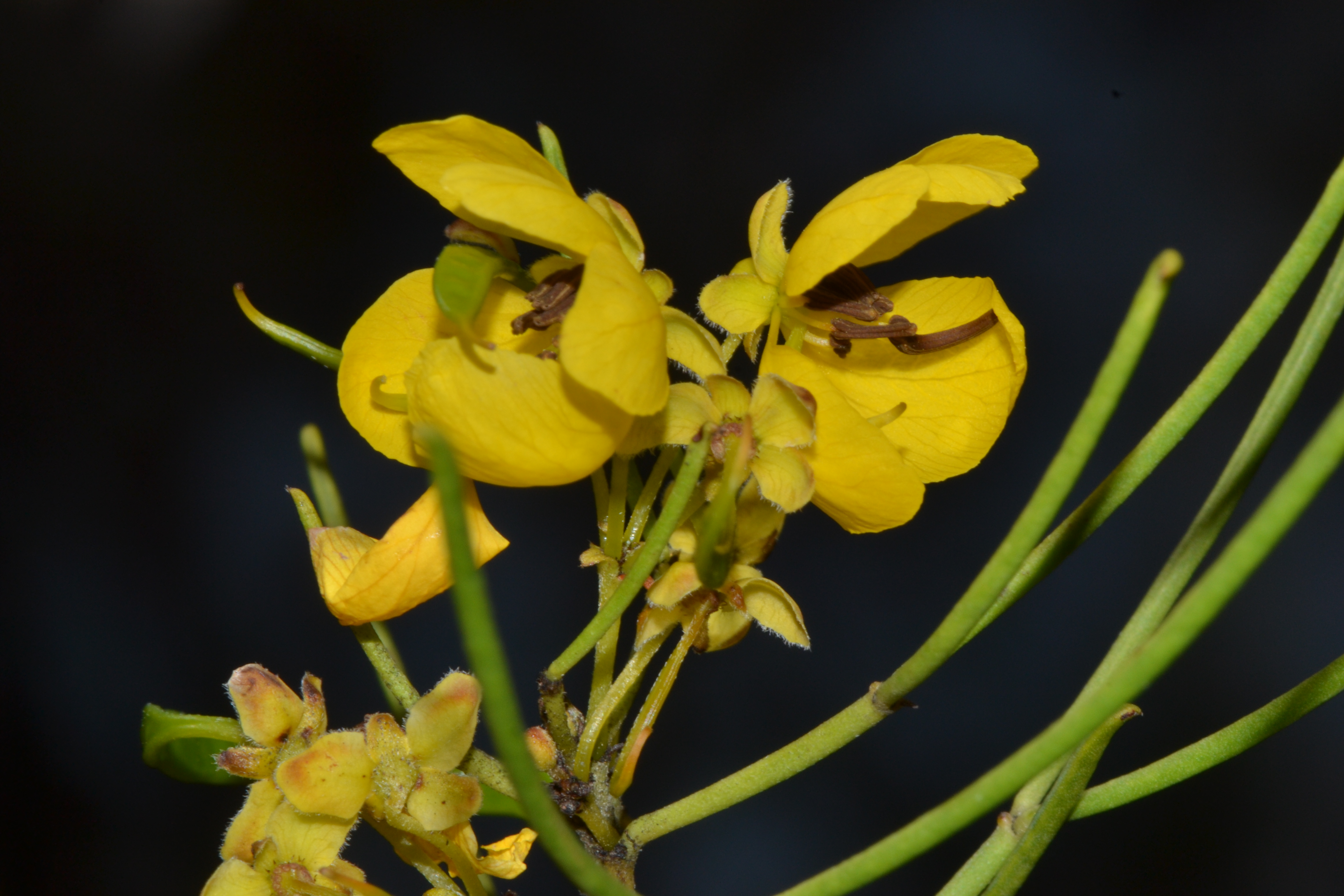
- Near the Pallinup River

Scientific classification
- Kingdom: Plantae
- Clade: Tracheophytes
- Clade: Angiosperms
- Clade: Eudicots
- Clade: Rosids
- Order: Fabales
- Family: Fabaceae
- Subfamily: Caesalpinioideae
- Genus: Senna
- Species: S. charlesiana

Binomial name
- Senna charlesiana (Symon) Randell

Synonyms
- Cassia charlesiana Symon; Senna glutinosa f. 'falcata' Randell; Senna glutinosa subsp. charlesiana (Symon) Randell

= Senna charlesiana =

Species of legume

Senna charlesiana is a species of flowering plant in the family Fabaceae and is endemic to Western Australia. It is an erect shrub with cylindrical leaves, sometimes with one or two pairs of cylindrical leaflets, and yellow flowers arranged in pairs or groups of three or four, with ten fertile stamens in each flower.

== Description ==
Senna charlesiana is an erect, compact or straggling shrub that typically grows to a height of up to 2 m (6 ft 7 in), its stems and foliage softly-hairy. The leaves are cylindrical, sometimes flattened, 40–100 mm (1.6–3.9 in) long on a petiole 4–10 mm (0.16–0.39 in) long and about 1 mm (0.039 in) wide, sometimes with one or two pairs of cylindrical leaflets 5–20 mm (0.20–0.79 in) long and about 1 mm (0.039 in) wide. The flowers are yellow and arranged in upper leaf axils in pairs or groups of up to four on a peduncle 10–20 mm (0.39–0.79 in) long, each flower on a pedicel 5–7 mm (0.20–0.28 in) long. The petals are about 12 mm (0.47 in) long and there are ten fertile stamens, the anthers about 3–4 mm (0.12–0.16 in) long. Flowering occurs in winter, and the fruit is a flat pod 50–60 mm (2.0–2.4 in) long.

== Taxonomy ==
This species was first formally described in 1966 by David Eric Symon who gave it the name Cassia charlesiana in the Transactions of the Royal Society of South Australia from specimens collected by Charles Gardner near Pintharuka in 1945. In 1998, Barbara Rae Randell and Bryan Alwyn Barlow transferred the species to Senna as Senna charlesiana in the Flora of Australia. The specific epithet (charlesiana) honours the collector of the type specimens.

== Distribution and habitat ==
Senna charlesiana grows in arid shrubland from near the Murchison River to the southern inland of Western Australia in the Avon Wheatbelt, Central Kimberley, Coolgardie, Esperance Plains, Gascoyne, Geraldton Sandplains, Mallee, Murchison, Pilbara and Yalgoo bioregions.
