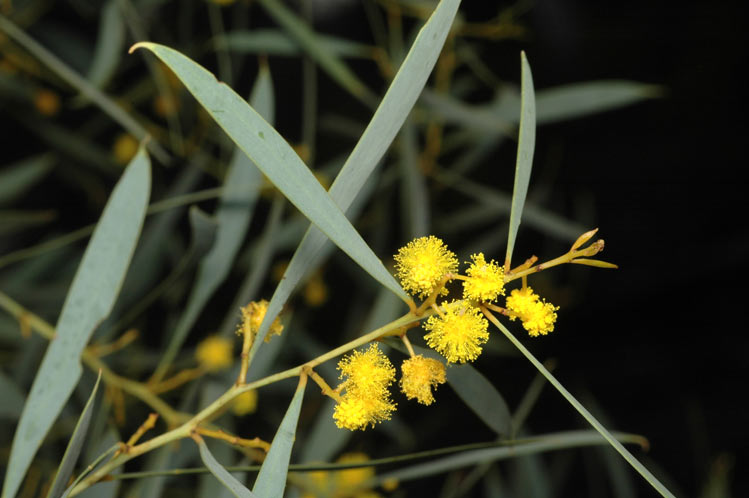

Scientific classification
- Kingdom: Plantae
- Clade: Tracheophytes
- Clade: Angiosperms
- Clade: Eudicots
- Clade: Rosids
- Order: Fabales
- Family: Fabaceae
- Subfamily: Caesalpinioideae
- Clade: Mimosoid clade
- Genus: Acacia
- Species: A. hemiteles

Binomial name
- Acacia hemiteles Benth.
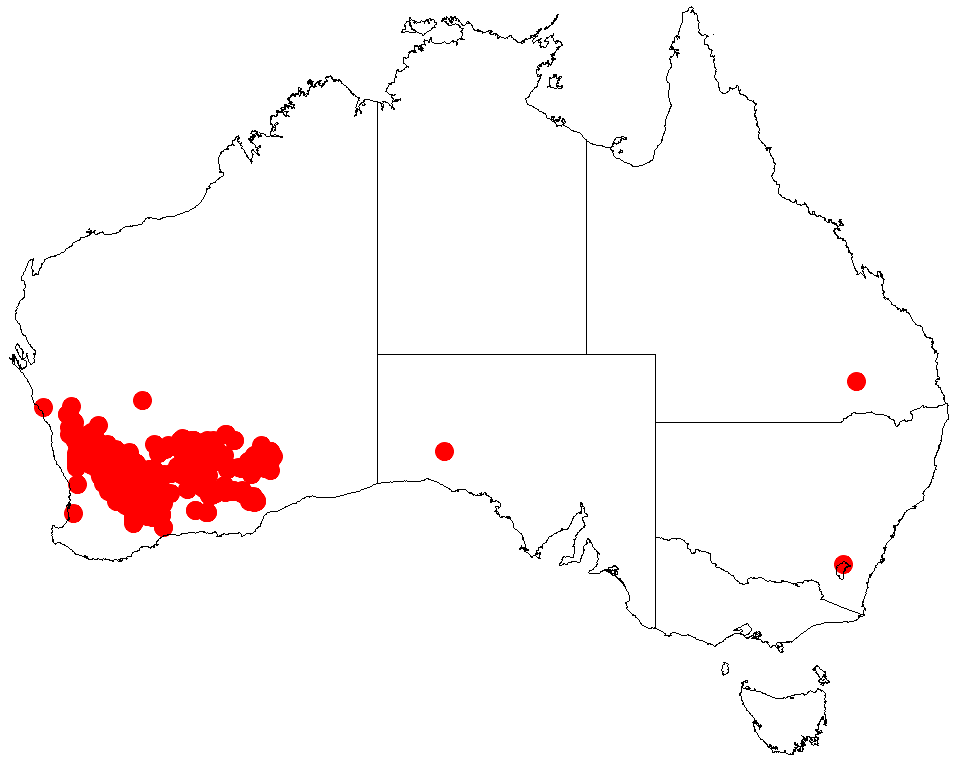
- Occurrence data from AVH

Synonyms
- List: Acacia dentifera var. intermedia S.Moore; Acacia graffiana F.Muell.; Acacia subcaerulea var. subsessilis E.Pritz.; Acacia subcoerulea var. subsessilis E.Pritz. orth. var.; Racosperma hemiteles (Benth.) Pedley; Acacia subcaerulea auct. non Lindl.: Bentham, G. (5 October 1864); Acacia subcaerulea auct. non Lindl.: Moore, S. le M. (1 July 1899)

= Acacia hemiteles =

Tan wattle

Species of legume

Acacia hemiteles, commonly known as tan wattle or broombush, is a species of flowering plant in the family Fabaceae and is endemic to western Australia. It is a dense, spreading, glabrous shrub with many stems, narrowly elliptic to narrowly oblong or linear phyllodes, flowers borne in spherical heads of golden yellow flowers, and slightly curved to coiled, papery pods.

== Description ==
Acacia hemiteles is a dense, spreading, multi-stemmed, glabrous shrub that typically grows to a height of 0.5–2 m (1 ft 8 in – 6 ft 7 in), and has angled to flattened branchlets at the ends. Its phyllodes are narrowly elliptic to more or less narrowly oblong or linear, narrowed at both ends, straight to curved, 40–100 mm (1.6–3.9 in) long and 4–9 mm (0.16–0.35 in) wide. The midrib and veins at the edges are prominent and there is a gland up to 3 mm (0.12 in) above the pulvinus. The flowers are borne in four to seven spherical heads in racemes in axils on peduncles 5–11 mm (0.20–0.43 in) long and enclosed in overlapping brown bracts when young. Each head has 20 to 30 golden yellow flowers. The pods are papery, slightly curved to 1½-coiled, up to 80 mm (3.1 in) long and 5–8 mm (0.20–0.31 in) wide. The seeds are oblong to elliptic or egg-shaped, 3–5 mm (0.12–0.20 in) long, dark brown to black and lack an aril.

== Taxonomy ==
Acacia hemiteles was first formally described in 1855 by George Bentham in the journal Linnaea: Ein Journal für die Botanik in ihrem ganzen Umfange, oder Beiträge zur Pflanzenkunde, from specimens collected by James Drummond. The specific epithet (hemiteles) means 'half complete'. Bentham did not explain the epithet, but maybe was referring to the sepals being sometimes absent.

== Distribution and habitat ==
Tan wattle is found from Kanandah Station on the Nullarbor Plain and west to Ongerup and Canna in the Avon Wheatbelt, Coolgardie, Geraldton Sandplains, Great Victoria Desert, Mallee, Murchison, Nullarbor and Yalgoo bioregions of Western Australia and near Maralinga in South Australia. It grows in a range of soils in woodland or shrubland, sometimes on laterite or granite rocks.

== Conservation status ==
Acacia hemiteles is listed as "not threatened" by the Government of Western Australia Department of Biodiversity, Conservation and Attractions.

== See also ==
- List of Acacia species
