= List of acts of the Parliament of Western Australia from 2010 =

This is a list of acts of the Parliament of Western Australia for the year 2010.

== 2010 ==
Short title, or popular name	Citation	Royal assent
Long title
Cross-border Justice Amendment Act 2010	No. 1 of 2010	9 March 2010
An Act to amend the Cross-border Justice Act 2008. (Note: Cross-border Justice Act 2008 (No. 7))
Railway (Tilley to Karara) Act 2010	No. 25 of 2010	7 July 2010
An Act to authorise the construction of a railway from Tilley to Karara, and for related purposes.
Railway (Butler to Brighton) Act 2010	No. 26 of 2010	7 July 2010
An Act to authorise the construction of a railway from Butler to Brighton.
Railway (Roy Hill Infrastructure Pty Ltd) Agreement Act 2010	No. 43 of 2010	28 October 2010
An Act—: to ratify, and authorise the implementation of, an agreement between the State and Roy Hill Infrastructure Pty Ltd, Roy Hill Holdings Pty Ltd and Roy Hill Iron Ore Pty Ltd relating to the development of a railway in the Pilbara region of the State; to modify the operation of the Railways (Access) Act 1998 (Note: Government Railways (Access) Act 1998 (No. 49)) and the Railways (Access) Code 2000, and for incidental and other purposes.
	No. X of 2010	
Railway and Port (The Pilbara Infrastructure Pty Ltd) Agreement Amendment Act 2010	No. 60 of 2010	10 December 2010
An Act to amend the Railway and Port (The Pilbara Infrastructure Pty Ltd) Agreement Act 2004 (Note: Railway and Port (The Pilbara Infrastructure Pty Ltd) Agreement Act 2004 ()) and the Railways (Access) Act 1998.
Iron Ore Agreements Legislation Amendment Act (No. 2) 2010	No. 61 of 2010	10 December 2010
An Act to amend these Acts—: the Iron Ore (Hamersley Range) Agreement Act 1963; (Note: Iron Ore (Hamersley Range) Agreement Act 1963 (No. 24)); the Iron Ore (Robe River) Agreement Act 1964; (Note: Iron Ore (Cleveland Cliffs) Agreement Act 1964 (No. 91)); the Iron Ore (Mount Bruce) Agreement Act 1972; (Note: Iron Ore (Mount Bruce) Agreement Act 1972 (No. 37)); the Iron Ore (Hope Downs) Agreement Act 1992; (Note: Iron Ore (Hope Downs) Agreement Act 1992 (No. 62)); the Iron Ore (Yandicoogina) Agreement Act 1996; (Note: Iron Ore (Yandicoogina) Agreement Act 1996 (No. 65)); the Iron Ore (Mount Newman) Agreement Act 1964; (Note: Iron Ore (Mount Newman) Agreement Act 1964 (No. 75)); the Iron Ore (Mount Goldsworthy) Agreement Act 1964; (Note: Iron Ore (Mount Goldsworthy) Agreement Act 1964 ()); the Iron Ore (Goldsworthy-Nimingarra) Agreement Act 1972; (Note: Iron Ore (Goldsworthy-Nimingarra) Agreement Act 1972 (No. 30)); the Iron Ore (McCamey’s Monster) Agreement Authorisation Act 1972; (Note: Iron Ore (McCamey’s Monster) Agreement Authorisation Act 1972 ()); the Iron Ore (Marillana Creek) Agreement Act 1991. (Note: Iron Ore (Marillana Creek) Agreement Act 1991 (No. 2))

== Sources ==
- "legislation.wa.gov.au".
