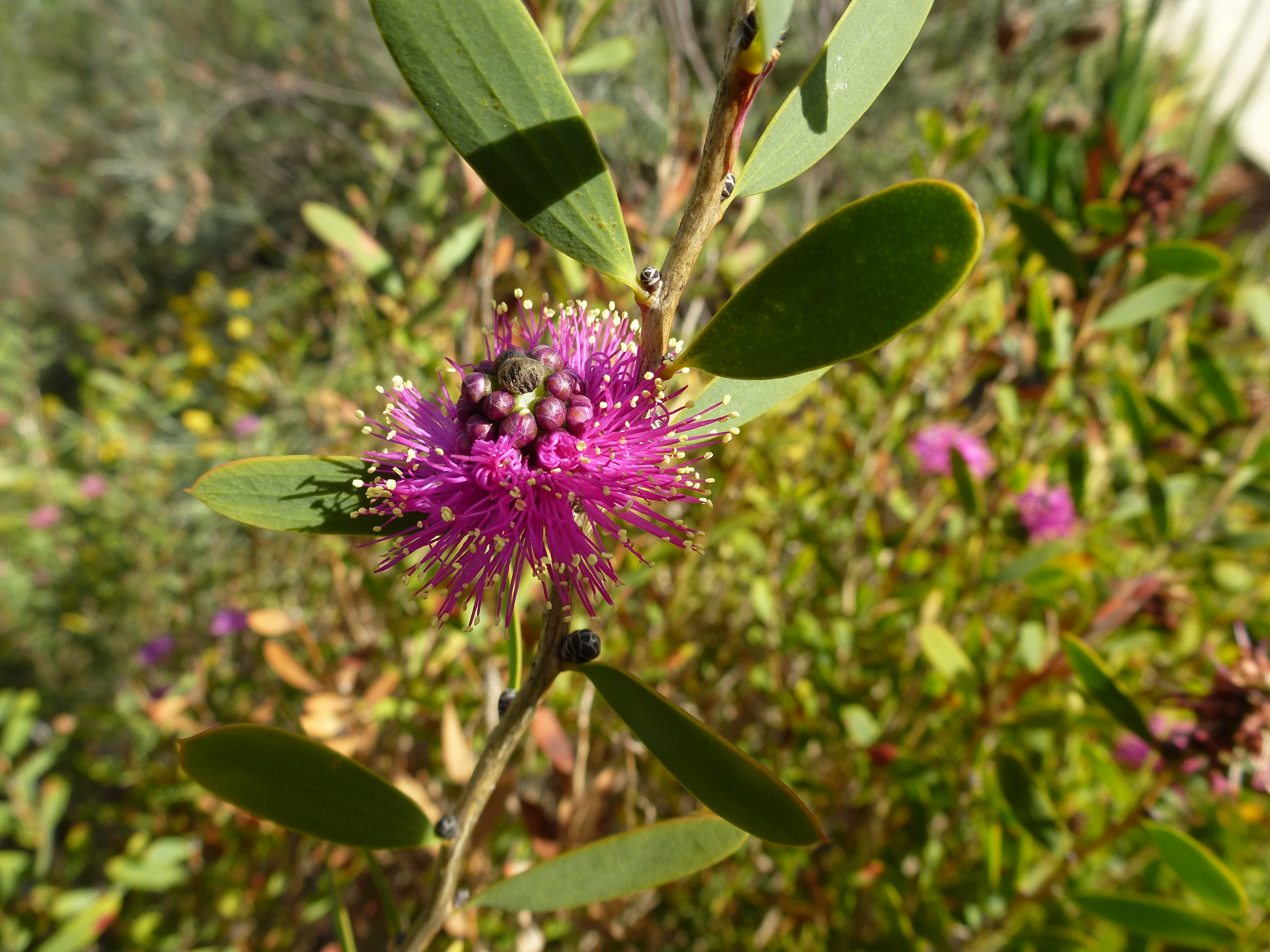

Scientific classification
- Kingdom: Plantae
- Clade: Tracheophytes
- Clade: Angiosperms
- Clade: Eudicots
- Clade: Rosids
- Order: Myrtales
- Family: Myrtaceae
- Genus: Melaleuca
- Species: M. conothamnoides

Binomial name
- Melaleuca conothamnoides C.A.Gardner

Synonyms
- Melaleuca cordata var. ovata Ewart

= Melaleuca conothamnoides =

Species of shrub

Melaleuca conothamnoides is a shrub in the myrtle family, Myrtaceae and is endemic to the south-west of Western Australia. It is distinguished by its relatively large leaves, prominent oil glands and unusual bracts covering the flower buds before they open.

== Description ==
Melaleuca conothamnoides is a woody, branching shrub about 1.5 m (5 ft) high and 1.0 m (3 ft) wide. Its leaves are arranged alternately, are lance-shaped to oblong or elliptic in shape, mostly 24–45 mm (0.9–2 in) long and 4–11 mm (0.2–0.4 in) wide, usually with prominent oil glands and 3 to 5 parallel veins.

The flowers are arranged in heads or short spikes, mostly at the ends of the branches which continue to grow after flowering but sometimes also in the upper leaf axils. The heads contain 8 to 15 groups of flowers in threes and are up to 35 mm (1 in) in diameter. The flower buds are covered with overlapping greenish-black bracts. The petals are 2–4 mm (0.08–0.2 in) long and fall off as the flowers open. The stamens are in five bundles around the edge of the flower, each bundle containing 7 to 9 purple or pinkish-mauve stamens. The main flowering season is from September to November but has been recorded as early as August and as late as January. After flowering, the fruit develop as roughly spherical or oval groups of woody capsules.

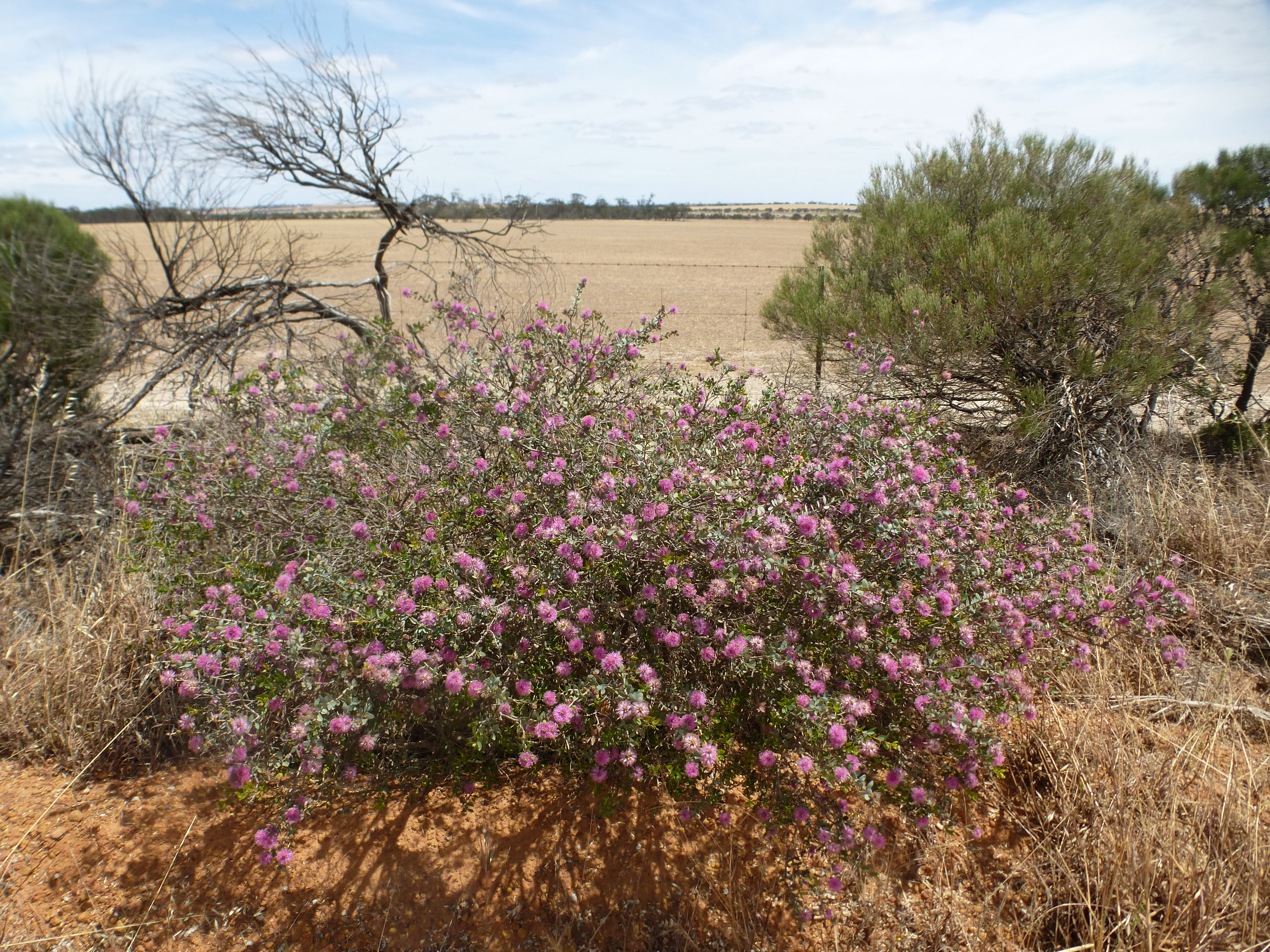
Habit south of Tammin

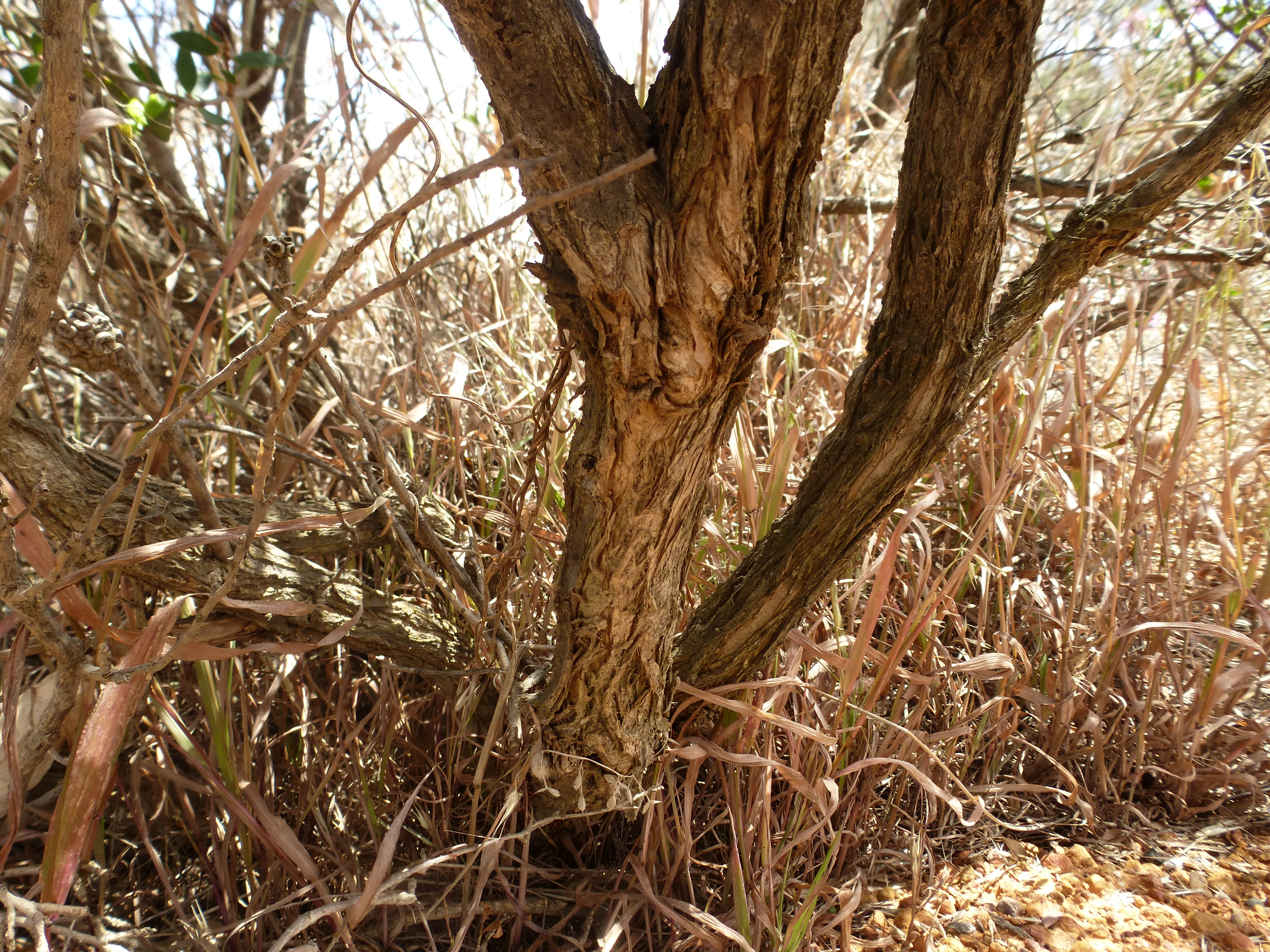
Bark

== Taxonomy and naming ==
This species was first formally described in 1964 by Charles Austin Gardner in the Journal of the Royal Society of Western Australia from a specimen he collected himself about 5 kilometres (3 mi) west of Tammin on a sandy, gravelly plain. The specific epithet (conothamnoides) refers to the similarity of this species to one in the genus Conothamnus. The ending -oides is a Latin suffix meaning "resembling" or "having the form of".

== Distribution and habitat ==
This melaleuca is mainly found in sandy and gravelly soils in the drier wheatbelt between Tammin and Morawa in the Avon Wheatbelt, Coolgardie, Geraldton Sandplains, Jarrah Forest, Murchison and Yalgoo biogeographic regions.

== Conservation status ==
Melaleuca conothamoides is listed as not threatened by the Government of Western Australia Department of Parks and Wildlife.
