= Acacia resinosa =

Scientific classification
- Kingdom: Plantae
- Clade: Tracheophytes
- Clade: Angiosperms
- Clade: Eudicots
- Clade: Rosids
- Order: Fabales
- Family: Fabaceae
- Subfamily: Caesalpinioideae
- Clade: Mimosoid clade
- Genus: Acacia
- Species: A. resinosa

Binomial name
- Acacia resinosa R.S.Cowan & Maslin
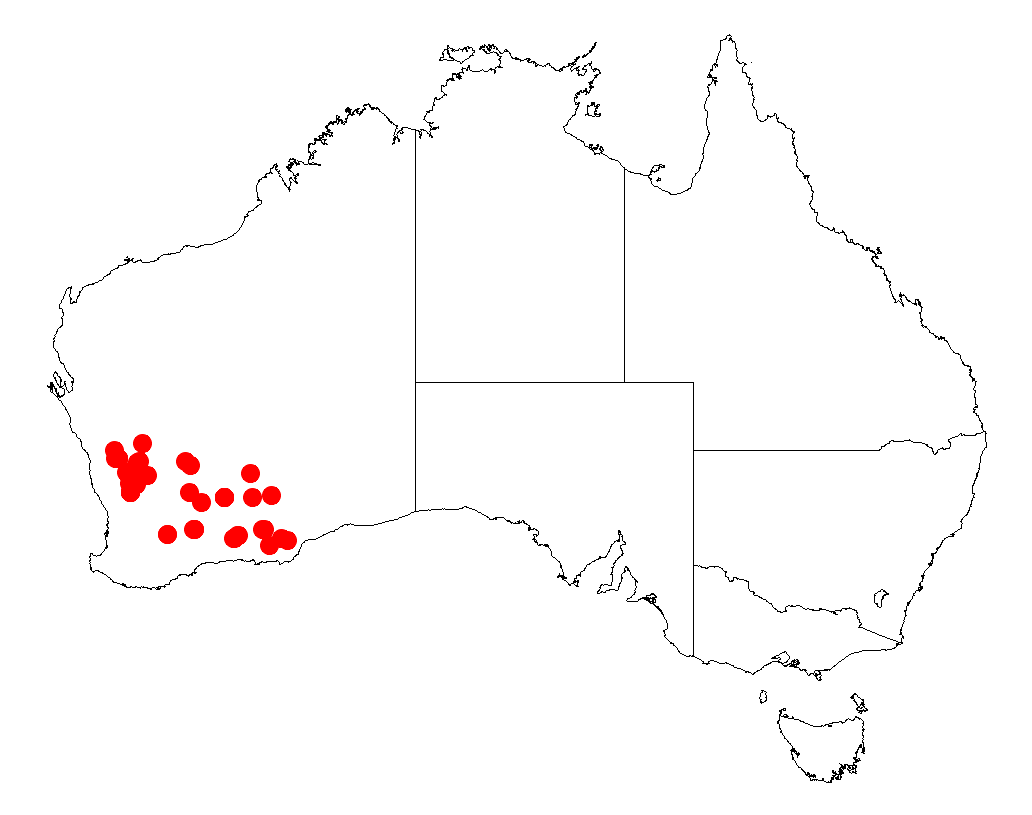
- Occurrence data from AVH

Species of legume

Acacia resinosa is a shrub of the genus Acacia and the subgenus Plurinerves and is endemic to arid and semi-arid parts of south western Australia.

== Description ==
The bushy, aromatic and resinous shrub typically grows to a height of 1 to 2.5 metres (3 to 8 ft). The glabrous branchlets often have resin encrusting the ribs or entire surface. Like most species of Acacia it has phyllodes rather than true leaves. The ascending to erect evergreen phyllodes are usually quite slender and straight to shallowly curved with a length of 3 to 8 cm (1.2 to 3.1 in) and a diameter of 0.5 to 1 mm (0.020 to 0.039 in) and terminate with a sharp tip. It blooms from June to September and produces yellow flowers.

== Distribution ==
It is native to an area in the Wheatbelt and Goldfields-Esperance regions of Western Australia where has a scattered distribution and it is commonly situated on flats and plains growing in sandy or loam and sandy clay soils that can contain a lot of gravel as a part of low open woodland or tall open shrubland and open heathland communities. It is found from around Gutha and Wongan Hills in the west to around near Southern Cross and Koolyanobbing in the north east.

== See also ==
- List of Acacia species
