= Acacia scabra =

Scientific classification
- Kingdom: Plantae
- Clade: Tracheophytes
- Clade: Angiosperms
- Clade: Eudicots
- Clade: Rosids
- Order: Fabales
- Family: Fabaceae
- Subfamily: Caesalpinioideae
- Clade: Mimosoid clade
- Genus: Acacia
- Species: A. scabra

Binomial name
- Acacia scabra Benth.

Species of legume

Acacia scabra is a shrub of the genus Acacia and the subgenus Phyllodineae. It is native to Western Australia.

A. scabra is thought to be a variant of Acacia nodiflora that has slightly larger phyllodes.

== See also ==
- List of Acacia species
