= Merkanooka, Western Australia =

Merkanooka
- Town
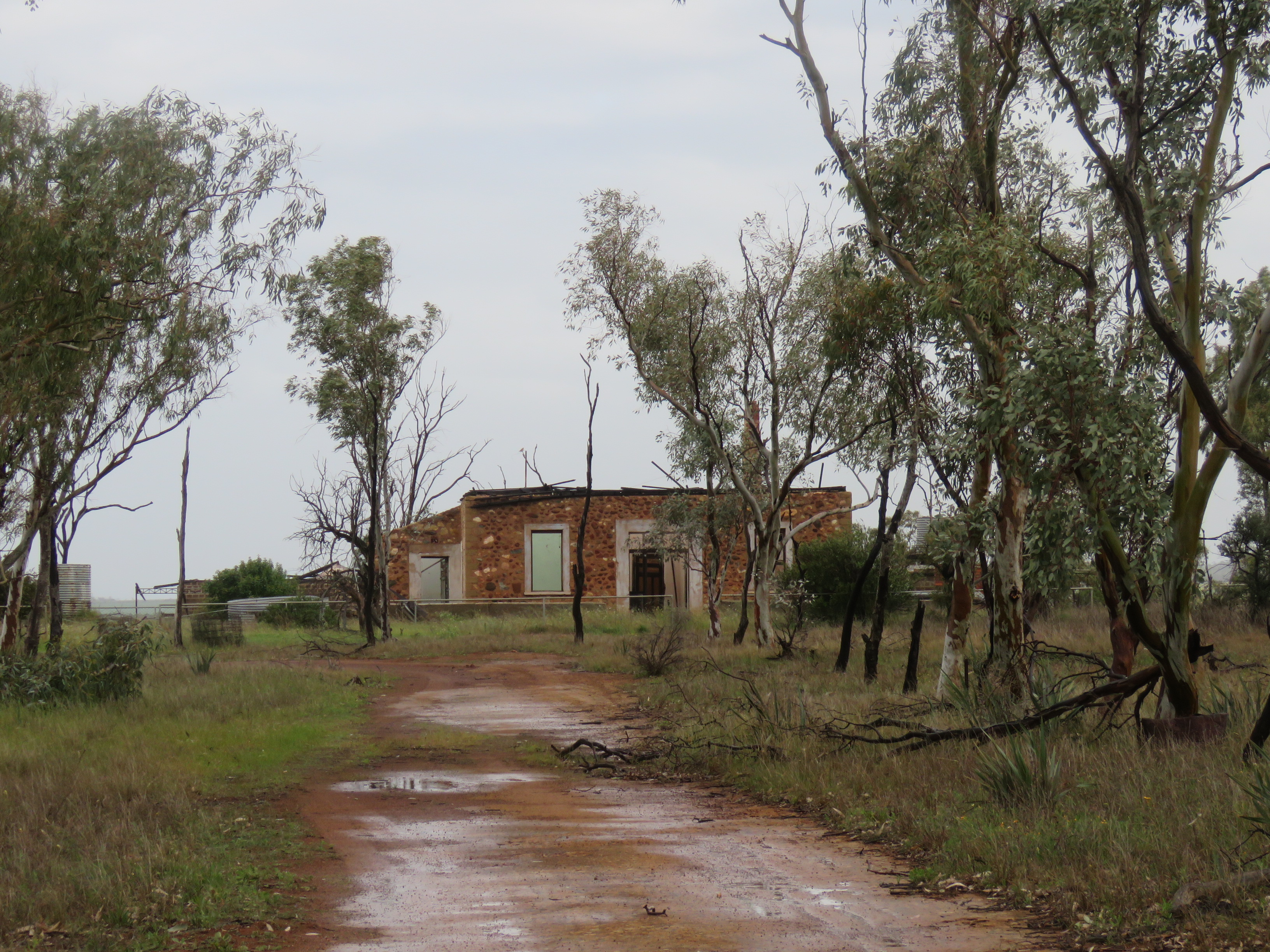
- A ruined homestead in Merkanooka in August 2022

- Coordinates: 29°9′59″S 115°52′37″E
- Country: Australia
- State: Western Australia
- LGA(s): Shire of Morawa

Government
  - State electorate(s): Moore
  - Federal division(s): Durack

Area
  - Total: 610.1 km^{2} (235.6 sq mi)

Population
  - Total(s): 57 (SAL 2021)
- Postcode: 6625

Merkanooka is a small town in the Mid West region of Western Australia.
