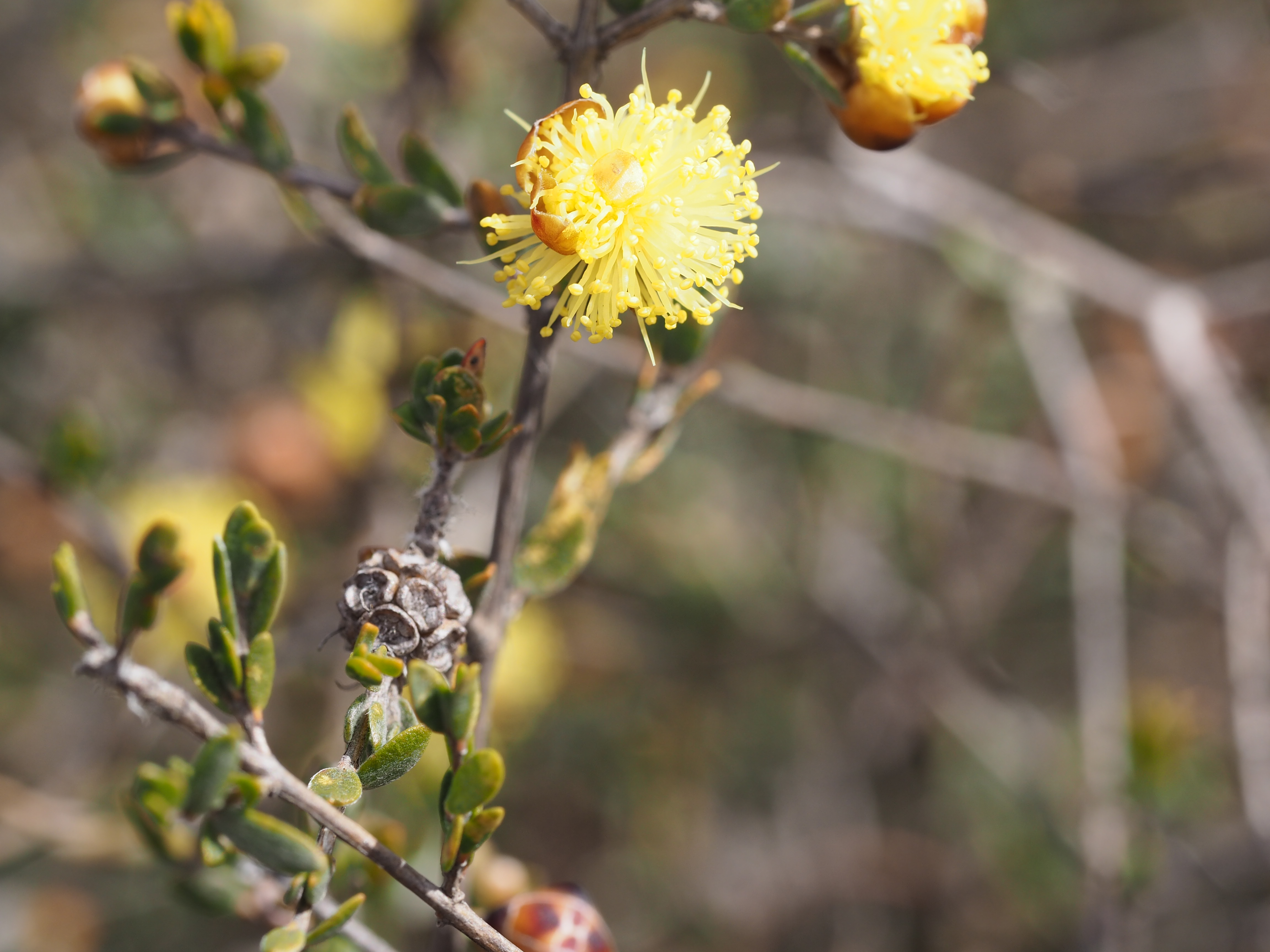

Scientific classification
- Kingdom: Plantae
- Clade: Tracheophytes
- Clade: Angiosperms
- Clade: Eudicots
- Clade: Rosids
- Order: Myrtales
- Family: Myrtaceae
- Genus: Conothamnus
- Species: C. aureus

Binomial name
- Conothamnus aureus (Turcz.) Domin

= Conothamnus aureus =

Species of flowering plant

Conothamnus aureus is a member of the family Myrtaceae and is endemic to Western Australia. It is a spindly, straggly shrub with rigid, blunt leaves and spherical heads of golden yellow flowers resembling those of wattles.

== Description ==
Conothamnus aureus is a spindly, straggly shrub with many branchlets, which grows to 30–50 cm (10–20 in) high and 50–100 cm (20–40 in) wide. The leaves are lance-shaped to egg-shaped, about 10 mm (0.4 in) long, 5 mm (0.2 in) wide and hairy with a single vein. The flowers are golden yellow and arranged on the ends of branchlets in spherical heads about 10 mm (0.4 in) in diameter. Its flowers differ from those in the other two species of Conothamnus in that its flowers lack petals. Flowering occurs between August and November.

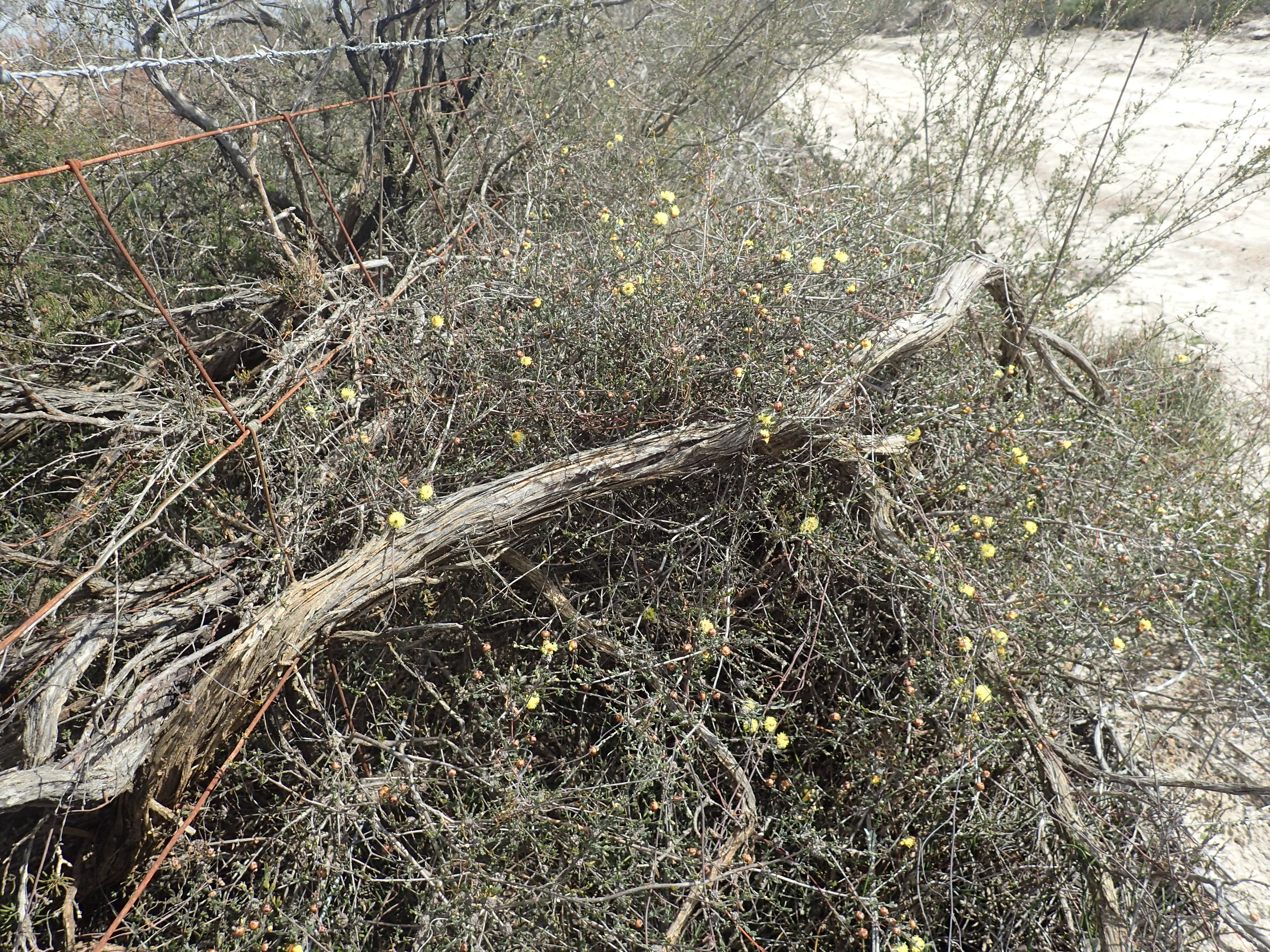
Near Scaddan

== Taxonomy and naming ==
This species was first formally described in 1852 by Nikolai Turczaninow who gave it the name Trichobasis aurea and published the description in Bulletin de la Classe Physico-Mathématique de l'Académie Impériale des Sciences de Saint-Pétersbourg. In 1923, Karel Domin changed the name to Conothamnus aureus. The specific epithet (aureus) is a Latin word meaning "golden".

== Distribution and habitat ==
Conothamnus aureus is found on sand plains, flats and sand dunes in an area along the south coast from the Stirling Range east to Israelite Bay, extending from the Great Southern and into the south western Goldfields-Esperance regions of Western Australia where it grows in sandy or loamy soils.
