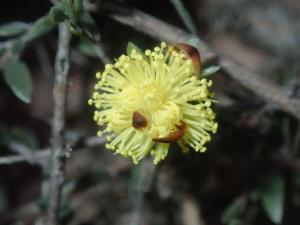

Scientific classification
- Kingdom: Plantae
- Clade: Tracheophytes
- Clade: Angiosperms
- Clade: Eudicots
- Clade: Rosids
- Order: Myrtales
- Family: Myrtaceae
- Genus: Conothamnus
- Species: C. neglectus

Binomial name
- Conothamnus neglectus Diels

= Conothamnus neglectus =

Species of flowering plant

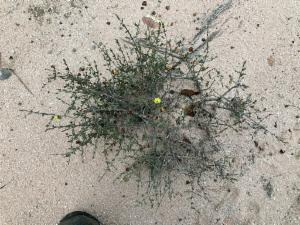
Habit in the Stirling Range National Park

Conothamnus neglectus is a member of the family Myrtaceae and is endemic to the south-west of Western Australia. This open shrub typically grows to a height of 0.2 to 1.0 metre (0.7 to 3.3 ft). It blooms in between July and September producing yellow flowers.

This plant was first formally described in 1904 by Ludwig Diels who published the description in Botanische jahrbucher fur systematik, pflanzengeschichte und pflanzengeographie under the heading Fragmenta Phytographiae Australiae occidentalis:Beitrage zur Kenntnis der Pflanzen Westaustraliens, ihrer Verbreitung und ihrer Lebensverhaltnisse ("Contributions to the knowledge of the plants of West Australia, where they are found and their conditions of existence").

In 2014, Lyndley Craven and Robert David Edwards transferred this species to the genus Melaleuca as M. crispii in the journal Taxon, a name accepted by Plants of the World Online, but not accepted by Australian authorities. (The name M. neglecta was not available, because it had already been used for a different taxon - Melaleuca neglecta. Ewart & B.Wood) The specific epithet (neglectus) means "overlooked", because the species had previously been overlooked.

Found on flats and swampy plains in an area along the south coast in the Avon Wheatbelt, Esperance Plains, Jarrah Forest and Warren bioregions of south-western Western Australia, where it grows in sandy or loamy or clay soils.
