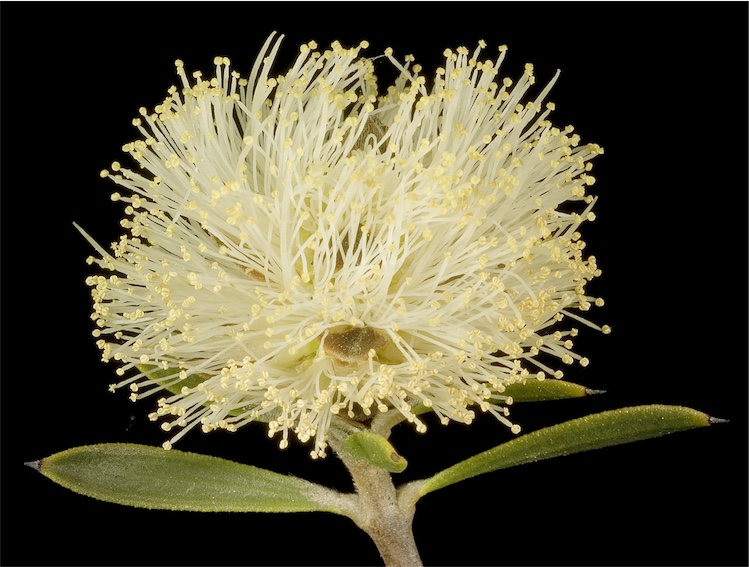
- In Forrestfield

Scientific classification
- Kingdom: Plantae
- Clade: Tracheophytes
- Clade: Angiosperms
- Clade: Eudicots
- Clade: Rosids
- Order: Myrtales
- Family: Myrtaceae
- Genus: Conothamnus
- Species: C. trinervis

Binomial name
- Conothamnus trinervis Lindl.

Synonyms
- Melaleuca cowleyae Craven & R.D.Edwards; Melaleuca cuspidata Turcz.

= Conothamnus trinervis =

Species of flowering plant

Conothamnus trinervis is a plant species in the family Myrtaceae endemic to Western Australia. It is a shrub with thick, stiff stems, leaves with a sharp point on the tip and heads of usually cream-coloured flowers.

== Description ==
Conothamnus trinervis is an erect or straggly shrub that typically grows to a height of 0.15 to 1.5 metres (0.5 to 4.9 ft) and has thick, stiff branches. The leaves are usually arranged in opposite pairs, sometimes in whorls of three, 1–4 cm (0.39–1.57 in) long with three veins and a sharp point on the tip. The flowers are yellow, cream-coloured or white, occasionally purple and arranged in heads about 3 cm (1.2 in) across. Each group of three flowers has a bract at its base and the flowers have five sepals and five petals. (The other two species of Conothamnus lack petals, and the flowers are in groups of two.) Flowering occurs between August and October.

== Taxonomy and naming ==
Conothamnus trinervis was first formally described in 1839 by John Lindley who published the description in A Sketch of the Vegetation of the Swan River Colony. The specific epithet (trinervis) is derived from the Latin prefix tri- meaning "three" and nervus meaning "sinew" or "tendon", and refers to the three-veined leaf.

== Distribution and habitat ==
This shrub is found along the west coast on the Swan Coastal Plain and in the Mid West and Wheatbelt regions of Western Australia where it grows in deep sandy lateritic soils in kwongan.
