= Karara railway line =

Railway in Western Australia

Karara railway

Overview
- Status: Operational
- Owner: Karara Mining Limited (leased from the Public Transport Authority)
- Locale: Mid West region of Western Australia
- Termini: Tilley Junction, Morawa; Karara mine

Service
- Type: Heavy rail
- Operator(s): Aurizon
- Depot(s): Narngulu

History
- Commenced: December 2010
- Opened: August 2012

Technical
- Line length: 78 km (48 mi)
- Number of tracks: 1
- Track gauge: 1,067 mm (3 ft 6 in) narrow gauge
- Signalling: Train Order Working

The Karara railway is a 78-kilometre (48 mi) railway line in the Mid West region of Western Australia, linking the Karara iron ore mine with the Public Transport Authority / Arc Infrastructure network near Morawa. The railway is leased by Karara Mining Limited and trains are operated by Aurizon between the mine and Geraldton port.

== Route ==
The Karara railway is managed by Karara Mining Limited, a joint venture between Gindalbie Metals and Ansteel Group. Karara Mining Limited holds a 49-year lease on the rail corridor from the Public Transport Authority, which began in August 2012. It branches off the Perenjori–Mullewa railway line four kilometres (2.5 mi) north of Morawa at Tilley Junction. (Note: Originally known as the Mullewa railway line, the Dalwallinu to Perenjori sector is not currently in use.)

It travels approximately 78 kilometres (48 mi) in an easterly direction from there. The first 18 kilometres (11 mi) is roughly parallel to the disused Koolanooka branch.

== Construction ==
The Railway (Tilley to Karara) Bill 2010 was introduced to the Parliament of Western Australia in May 2010 and passed as the Railway (Tilley to Karara) Act 2010 in July 2010.

In August 2010, Karara Mining Limited awarded Macmahon Holdings the $86 million contract to build the Karara railway, including earthworks and tracklaying. The track was supplied by Karara Mining Limited owner Ansteel. Construction began in December 2010. To maintain compatibility with the Arc Infrastructure network, the Karara railway was constructed with narrow gauge tracks, although dual gauge sleepers were used to allow for easy conversion to standard gauge in the future, as the future Oakajee Port was planned to have standard gauge access. Associated with the Karara railway construction was an upgrade of the 199 kilometres (124 mi) of rail between Geraldton and Morawa. Karara Mining Limited signed a $300 million contract with Brookfield Rail (since renamed Arc Infrastructure), the lessee of Western Australia's public rail freight network, to upgrade the Geraldton to Morawa railway.

== Operations ==
In 2011, QR National (since renamed Aurizon) was awarded a 10-year contract for operating all trains to and from the Karara mine. The contract was worth approximately $900 million and involved QR National expanding its Narngulu maintenance yard. Train frequencies were four trains per day, each with 100 wagons, and up to 10 megatonnes (9,800,000 long tons; 11,000,000 short tons) per annum was expected to be hauled. The first train load of iron ore was in August 2012.
