= Canna, Western Australia =

Canna
- Town
- Coordinates: 28.90°S 115.867°E
- Country: Australia
- State: Western Australia
- LGA(s): Shire of Morawa
- Location: 401 km (249 mi) N of Perth; 13 km (8.1 mi) NW of Gutha
- Established: 1928

Government
  - State electorate(s): Moore
  - Federal division(s): Durack

Area
  - Total: 840.1 km^{2} (324.4 sq mi)
- Elevation: 342 m (1,122 ft)

Population
  - Total(s): 57 (SAL 2021)
- Postcode: 6627

Canna is a small town in the Mid West region of Western Australia. It is located between the towns of Morawa and Mullewa on the Mullewa-Wubin Road. At the 2006 census, Canna had a population of 81.

Originating as a railway siding on the Wongan Hills to Mullewa railway line the public works department planned to locate a station named Pindawa on the present site. The name was regarded as unsuitable due to its similarity to the existing town of Pindar so in 1914 it was decided to use Canna instead. The townsite was gazetted in 1928.

The main industry in town is wheat farming with the town being a Cooperative Bulk Handling grain receival point.
