= Acacia nodiflora =

Conservation status
- Priority Three — Poorly Known Taxa (DEC)

Scientific classification
- Kingdom: Plantae
- Clade: Tracheophytes
- Clade: Angiosperms
- Clade: Eudicots
- Clade: Rosids
- Order: Fabales
- Family: Fabaceae
- Subfamily: Caesalpinioideae
- Clade: Mimosoid clade
- Genus: Acacia
- Species: A. nodiflora

Binomial name
- Acacia nodiflora Benth.
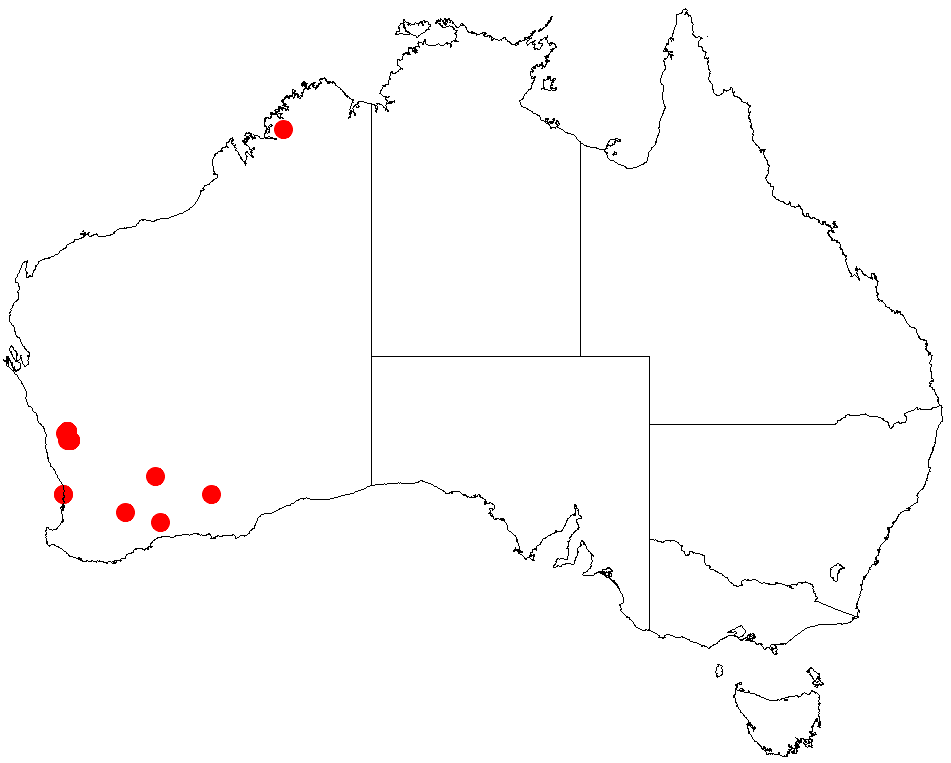
- Occurrence data from AVH

Synonyms
- Acacia nodiflora Benth. var. nodiflora; Racosperma nodiflorum (Benth.) Pedley

Species of legume

Acacia nodiflora is a species of flowering plant in the family Fabaceae, and is endemic to the south-west of Western Australia. It is a widely spreading, intricate shrub, its end branchlets occasionally coarsely spiny. Its phyllodes are linear and in clusters of up to seven, the flowers are borne in spherical to oblong heads, and the pods are narrowly oblong and thinly crusty.

== Description ==
Acacia nodiflora is a widely spreading, intricate shrub that typically grows to a height of 0.6–2 m (2 ft 0 in – 6 ft 7 in) and has branchlets that are spiny on the ends. Its phyllodes are linear, 7–13 mm (0.28–0.51 in) long, 0.5–1.5 mm (0.020–0.059 in) long and arranged in clusters of up to seven, with spiny stipules up to 4 mm (0.16 in) long at the base of the clusters. There is a hard point near the end of each phyllode and a gland in the lower half. The flowers are borne in up to three spherical or shortly oblong heads in axils on peduncles 10–20 mm (0.39–0.79 in) long, each head with 25 to 55 golden yellow flowers. Flowering occurs from August to September, and the pods are narrowly oblong, up to 65 mm (2.6 in) long, 7–8 mm (0.28–0.31 in) wide, thinly crusty and yellow-brown. The seeds are oblong, about 5 mm (0.20 in) wide and dull brown with a slightly shiny aril.

== Taxonomy ==
Acacia nodiflora was first formally described in 1855 by George Bentham in the journal Linnaea: Ein Journal für die Botanik in ihrem ganzen Umfange, oder Beiträge zur Pflanzenkunde from specimens collected by James Drummond. The specific epithet (nodiflora) means 'knot-flowered', referring to the flowers being at the stem nodes.

== Distribution and habitat ==
This species of wattle grows among rocks in rocky loam or clay in the Avon Wheatbelt bioregion, and is only known from two specific places in the Morawa-Carnamah area in the south-west of Western Australia.

== Conservation status ==
Acacia nodiflora is listed as 'Priority Three' by the Government of Western Australia Department of Biodiversity, Conservation and Attractions, meaning that it is poorly known and known from only a few locations but is not under imminent threat.

== See also ==
- List of Acacia species
