= Pintharuka, Western Australia =

Pintharuka
- Town
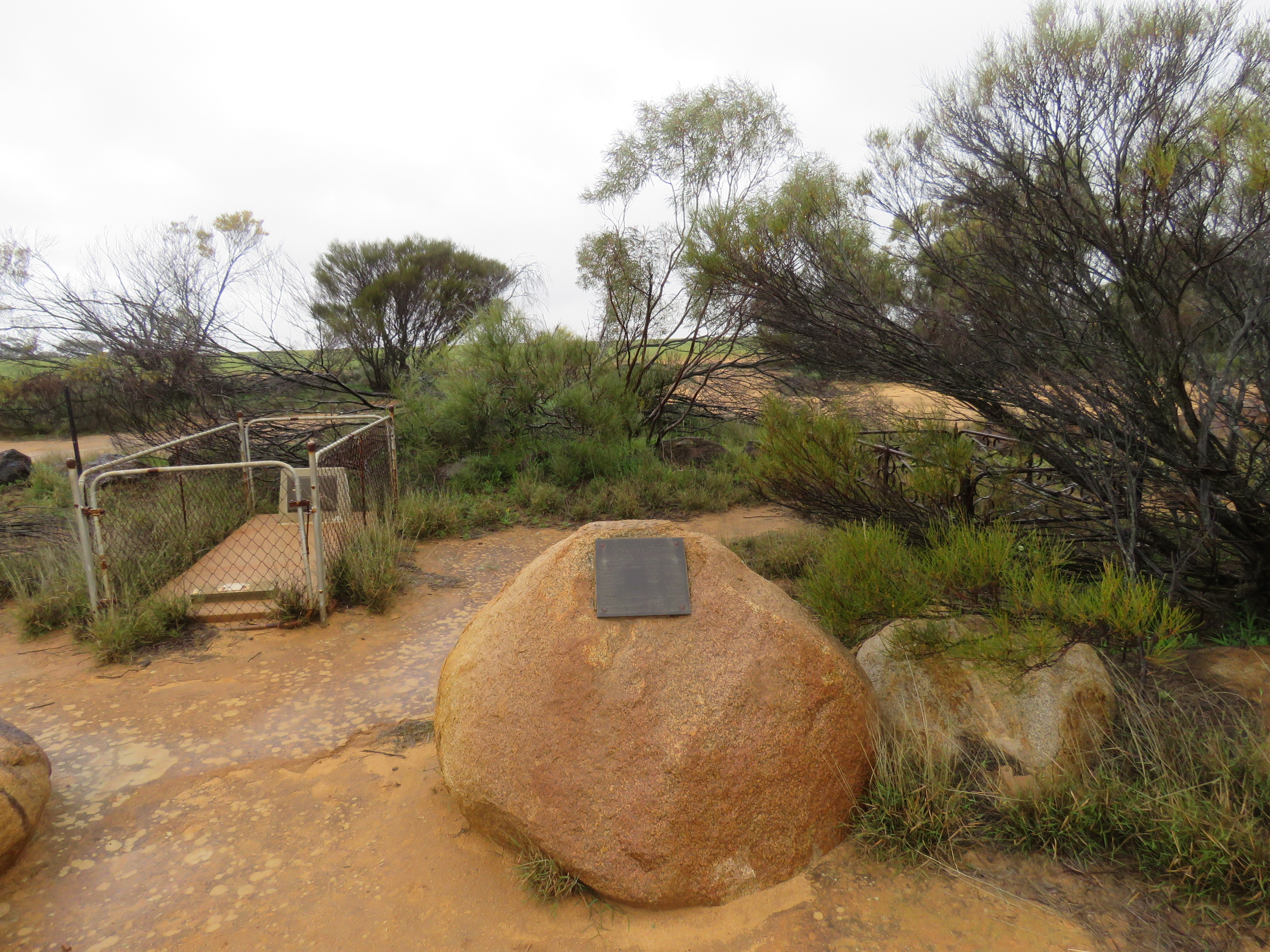
- The historic Pintharuka cemetery in August 2022

- Coordinates: 29.083°S 115.967°E
- Country: Australia
- State: Western Australia
- LGA(s): Shire of Morawa
- Location: 386 km (240 mi) N of Perth; 10 km (6.2 mi) N of Morawa
- Established: 1913

Government
  - State electorate(s): Moore
  - Federal division(s): Durack

Area
  - Total: 558 km^{2} (215 sq mi)
- Elevation: 303 m (994 ft)

Population
  - Total(s): 19 (SAL 2021)
- Postcode: 6623

Pintharuka is an abandoned townsite in the Mid West region of Western Australia. The town is located between the towns of Morawa and Mullewa on the Mullewa-Wubin Road

During the planning of the railway to be constructed between Mullewa and Wongan Hills in 1912, the local progress association requested that a townsite be surveyed at the siding that was to be built in the present townsite. The name of the siding was chosen as Pintharika in 1913 and the townsite was gazetted later the same year.

The area's main industry is in agriculture: particularly cereal cropping and raising livestock. The town and the area was flooded and many sheep were killed in 1948 by the hail and rain from violent thunderstorms.

The name of the town is taken from a nearby well which was surveyed and recorded in 1910. The name is Aboriginal in origin but its meaning is not known.

In 1932, the Wheat Pool of Western Australia announced that the town would have two grain elevators, each fitted with an engine installed at the railway siding.

The town is a receival site for Cooperative Bulk Handling.
