= Shire of Morawa =

Coordinates: 29°12′40″S 116°00′32″E

- Local government area
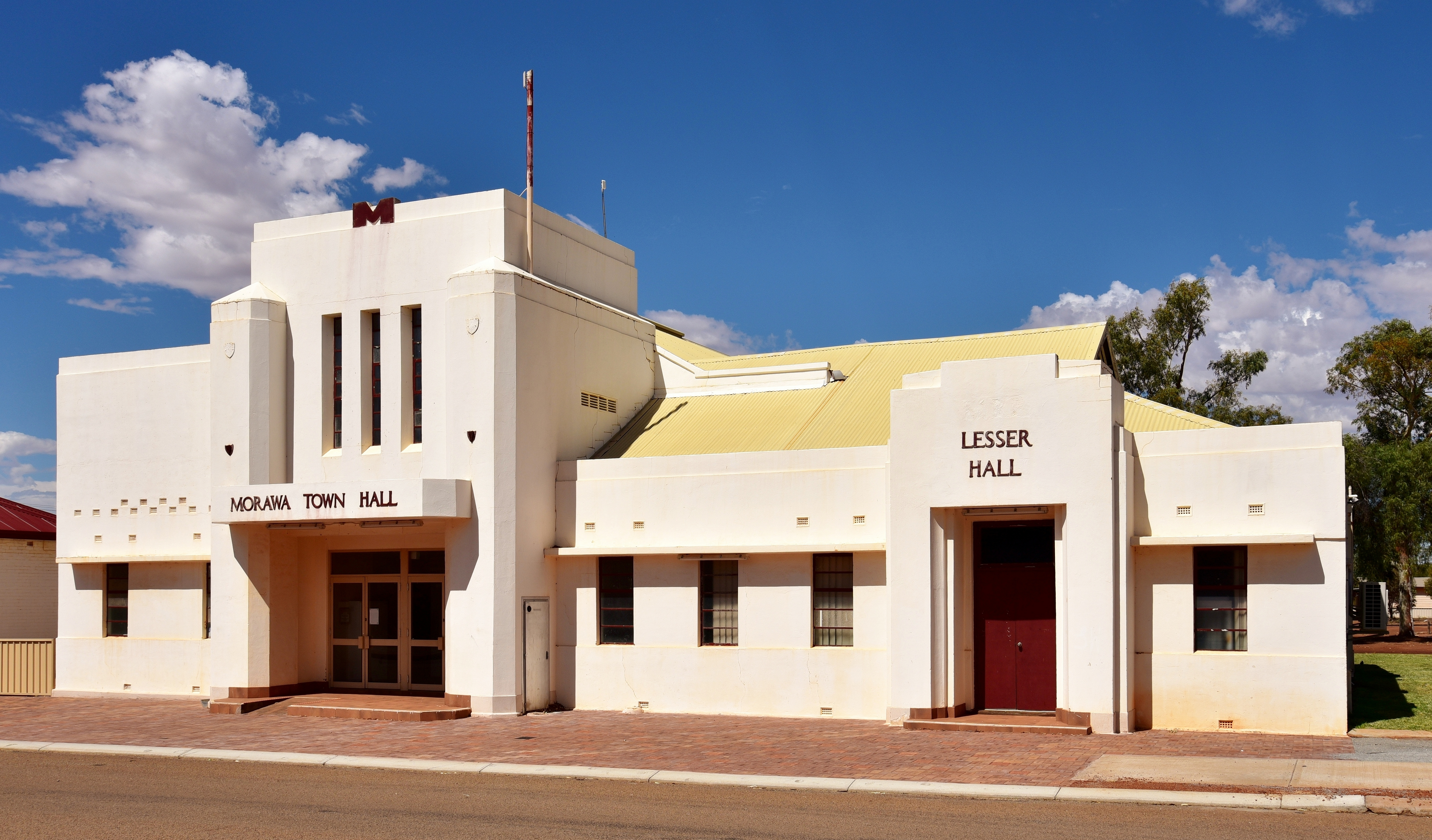
- Morawa Town Hall, 2018

- Interactive map of Shire of Morawa
- Country: Australia
- State: Western Australia
- Region: Mid West
- Council seat: Morawa

Government
  - Shire President: Karen Chappel
  - State electorate: Moore
  - Federal division: Durack

Area
  - Total: 3,515.8 km^{2} (1,357.5 sq mi)

Population
  - Total: 660 (LGA 2021)
- Website: Shire of Morawa
LGAs around Shire of Morawa
Greater Geraldton	Greater Geraldton	Yalgoo
Mingenew	Shire of Morawa	Perenjori
Three Springs	Perenjori	Perenjori

The Shire of Morawa is a local government area in the Mid West region of Western Australia, about 170 kilometres (106 mi) east-southeast of the city of Geraldton and about 390 kilometres (242 mi) north of the state capital, Perth. The Shire covers an area of 3,516 square kilometres (1,358 sq mi), and its seat of government is the town of Morawa.

== History ==
The Shire of Morawa originated as the Morawa Road District, established on 27 April 1928 when the Perenjori-Morawa Road District (which had separated from the Upper Irwin Road District in 1916), split into separate Morawa and Perenjori road districts.

On 1 July 1961, Morawa became a shire following the passage of the Local Government Act 1960, which reformed all remaining road districts into shires.

On 18 September 2009, the Shires of Mingenew, Three Springs, Morawa and Perenjori announced their intention to amalgamate. A formal agreement was signed five days later, and the name Billeranga was later chosen. However, by February 2011, community pressure had led to the negotiations stalling, and on 16 April 2011, voters from the Shire of Perenjori defeated the proposal at a referendum.

== Wards ==
The Shire is no longer divided into wards and the seven councillors sit at large. Prior to the 1997 election, the Shire was divided into wards:

- Town Ward (three councillors)
- Central Ward (two councillors)
- North Ward (two councillors)
- South Ward (two councillors)
- Pintharuka Ward (two councillors)

== Towns and localities ==
The towns and localities of the Shire of Morawa with population and size figures based on the most recent Australian census:

Locality	Population	Area	Map
Canna	57 (SAL 2021)	840.1 km^{2} (324.4 sq mi)	
Gutha	41 (SAL 2021)	643.1 km^{2} (248.3 sq mi)	
Koolanooka	22 (SAL 2021)	667.6 km^{2} (257.8 sq mi)	
Merkanooka	57 (SAL 2021)	610.1 km^{2} (235.6 sq mi)	
Morawa	459 (SAL 2021)	190.5 km^{2} (73.6 sq mi)	
Pintharuka	19 (SAL 2021)	558 km^{2} (215 sq mi)	

== Population ==
Prior to 1933 the census area was incorporated in the Perenjori-Morawa Road District.

Historical population

Year	Pop.	±% p.a.
1933	1,141	—
1947	943	−1.35%
1954	1,223	+3.78%
1961	1,317	+1.06%
1966	1,718	+5.46%
1971	1,649	−0.82%
1976	1,466	−2.33%
1981	1,290	−2.53%

Year	Pop.	±% p.a.
1986	1,165	−2.02%
1991	1,007	−2.87%
1996	1,058	+0.99%
2001	924	−2.67%
2006	824	−2.26%
2011	894	+1.64%
2016	750	−3.45%
2021	660	−2.52%

== Heritage-listed places ==
As of 2023, 54 places are heritage-listed in the Shire of Morawa, of which six are on the State Register of Heritage Places.
