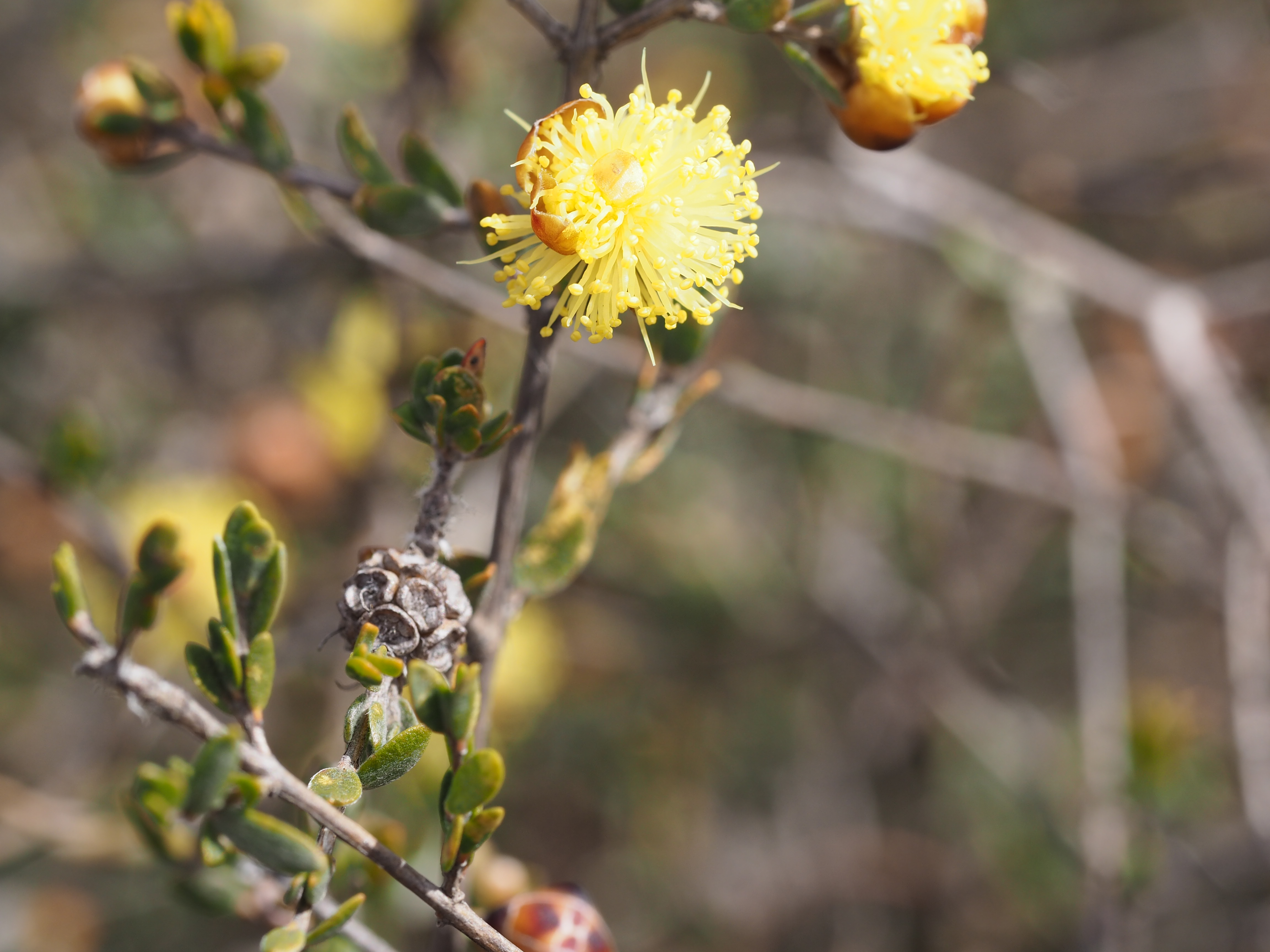
- Conothamnus aureus

Scientific classification
- Kingdom: Plantae
- Clade: Tracheophytes
- Clade: Angiosperms
- Clade: Eudicots
- Clade: Rosids
- Order: Myrtales
- Family: Myrtaceae
- Subfamily: Myrtoideae
- Tribe: Melaleuceae
- Genus: Conothamnus; Lindl.

Synonyms
- Melaleuca sect. Conothamnus (Lindl.) Baill.; Trichobasis Turcz.

= Conothamnus =

Genus of flowering plants

Conothamnus is a genus of flowering plants in the family Myrtaceae and is endemic to the south-west of Western Australia. They are woody shrubs similar to melaleucas but differ in that their leaves are usually arranged in opposite pairs and the maximum number of seeds per fruit is three. (Melaleucas usually have alternately arranged leaves and there may be hundreds of very fine seeds in each woody capsule.)

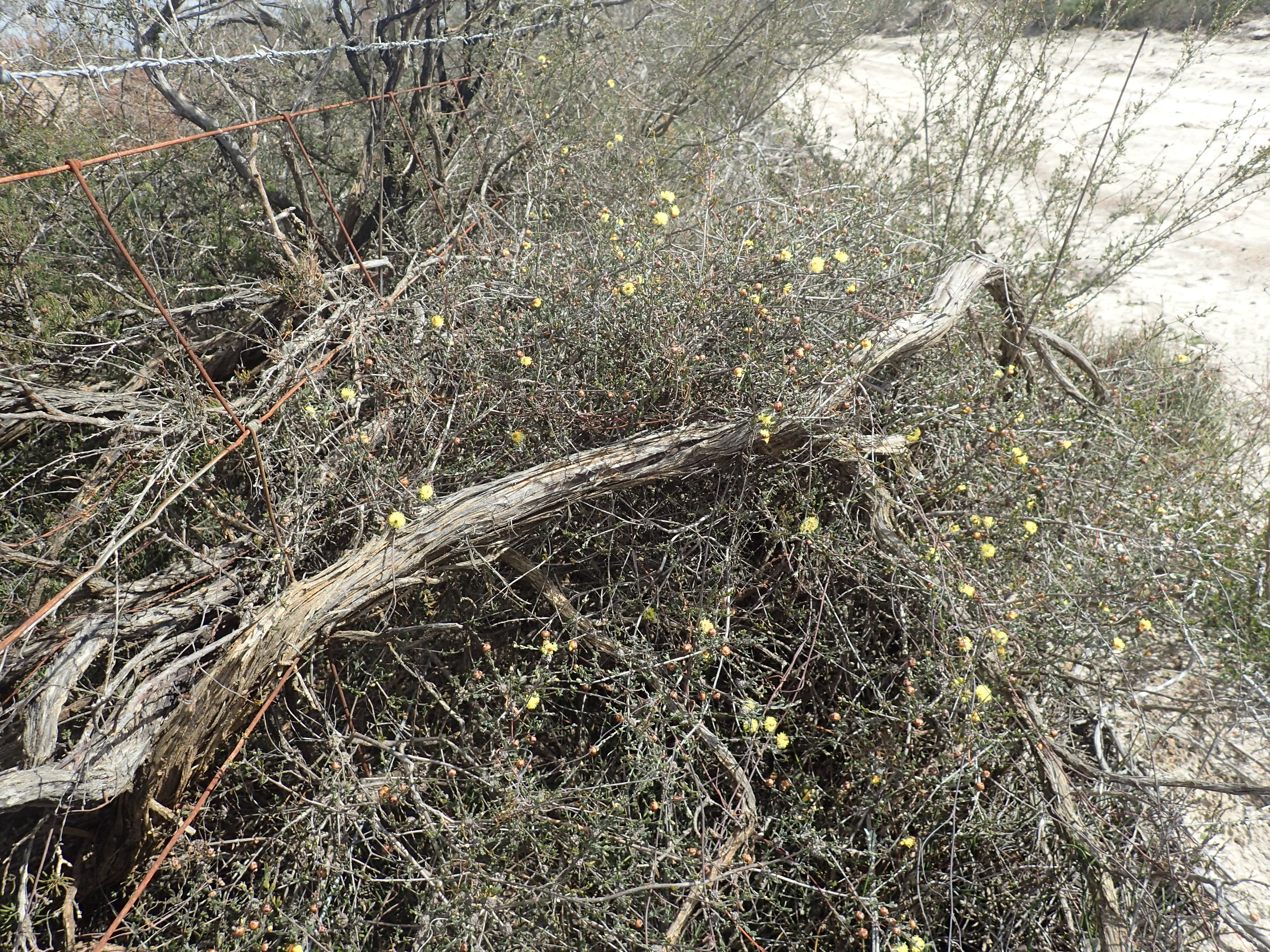
C. aureus near Scaddan

== Description ==
Plants in the genus Conothamnus are shrubs with their thinner branches covered with silky hairs. Their leaves are small, arranged in pairs and dotted with oil glands. The flowers have both male and female parts or sometimes have only fertile male parts. The flowers are arranged in small heads or spikes in the angles of leaves near the ends of the branches and are a shade of white to yellow. They have 5 sepals and 5 petals, except in Conothamnus aureus which appears to lack petals. There are many stamens, arranged in 5 bundles around the edge of the flower and are a shade of white to yellow. It is the stamens that give the flower its colour. The fruit that follows is a woody capsule.

== Taxonomy and naming ==
Conothamnus was first formally described as a genus in 1839 by John Lindley in A Sketch of the Vegetation of the Swan River Colony, and the first species he described (the type species) was Conothamnus trinervis. He noted:

...[it] bears to Melaleuca the same relation as Beaufortia to Calothamnus; that is to say, it differs in having the fruit only three-seeded instead of many-seeded; to this plant, which is more curious than beautiful, the name of Conothamnus trinervis may be given.

The name Conothamnus means "cone-bush", referring to the shape of the flower heads.

== Distribution and habitat ==
Conothamnus species are restricted to near-coastal areas of the south-west in the Avon Wheatbelt, Esperance Plains, Jarrah Forest, Warren, Geraldton Sandplains, Mallee and Swan Coastal Plain biogeographic regions. They grow in sand or sandy loam in gravelly areas, swampy plains, flats and sand dunes.

Three species of Conothamnus are recognised by the Western Australian Herbarium:

- Conothamnus aureus (Turcz.) Domin
- Conothamnus neglectus Diels
- Conothamnus trinervis Lindl.
