= Karara mine =

Iron ore mine in Western Australia

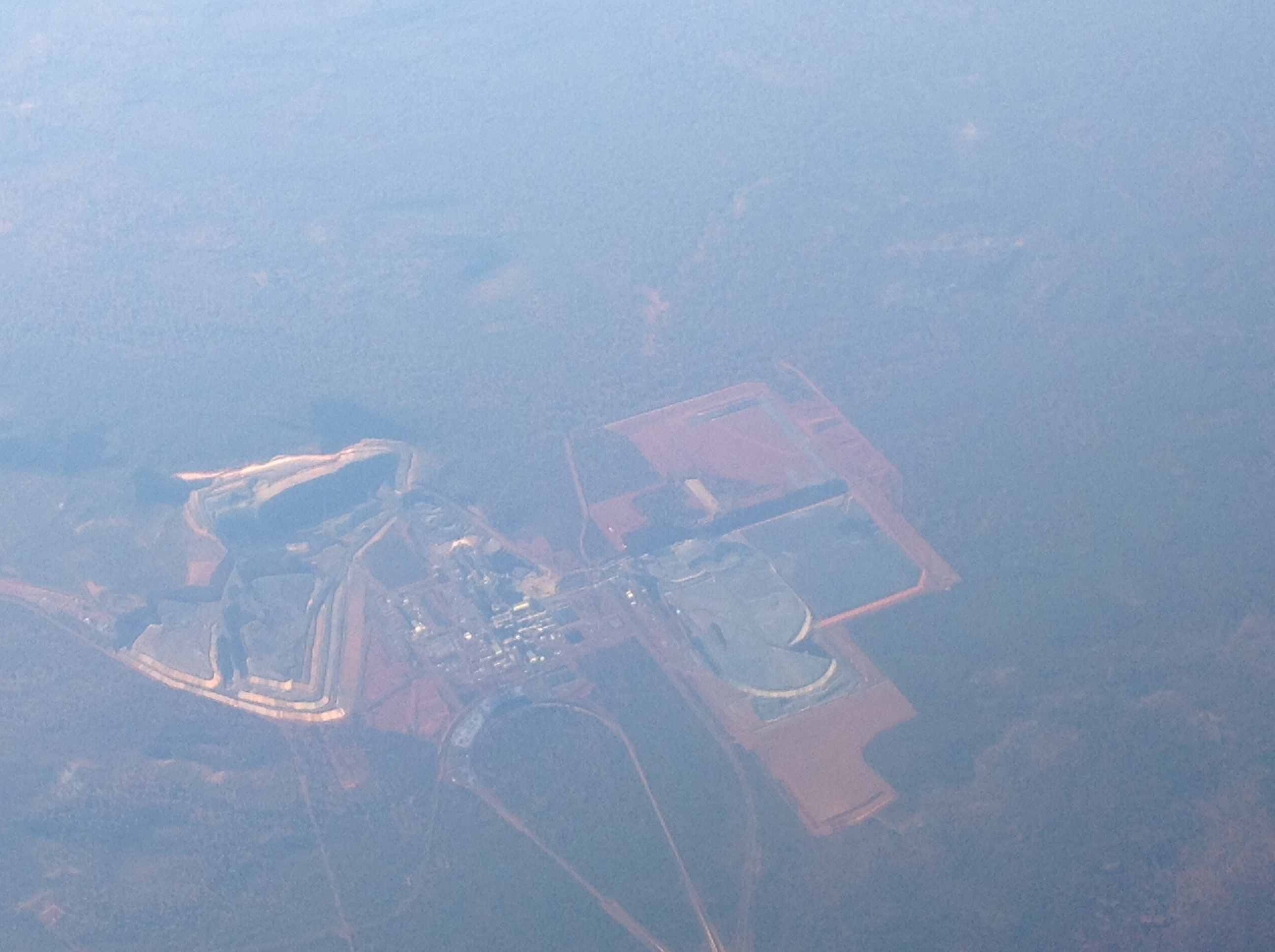
- The Karara mine, as seen from the air

- Location in Western Australia
- Interactive map of Karara mine
- Location: Shire of Perenjori, Western Australia, Australia; 29°11′28″S 116°45′38″E
- Products: Iron ore
- Production: 8 million tonnes per annum
- Opened: 2010
- Company: Ansteel Group and Gindalbie Metals
- Website: https://www.kararamining.com.au

The Karara mine is a large iron mine located in the Mid West region of Western Australia. Karara has estimated reserves of 2 billion tonnes of ore grading 35.5% iron metal. It is one of the few magnetite producers in Western Australia. It is owned by Ansteel Group (52.16%) and Gindalbie Metals (47.84%). The mine is operated by Karara Mining Limited.

== Timeline ==
- In 2011, steelwork for the Karara project was delayed by major floods in Thailand.
- In 2014, production was increased by over 35% in the June quarter, with more than 2 million tons of iron ore being shipped. Despite the increase the project was still not making a profit.

== Transport ==
The Karara mine is linked to the Arc Infrastructure network by the 79-kilometre (49 mi) long Karara railway. The ore would be initially transported by a narrow gauge railway to the existing port of Geraldton in quantities up to 10 million tonnes per annum (Mtpa). When a standard gauge railway is built to a new port at Oakajee, the tonnage would increase to at least 30 Mtpa. The common part of the narrow gauge and standard gauge routes will be dual gauge.

The Karara branch joins the main line just north of Morawa.
