= Gutha, Western Australia =

Gutha
- Town
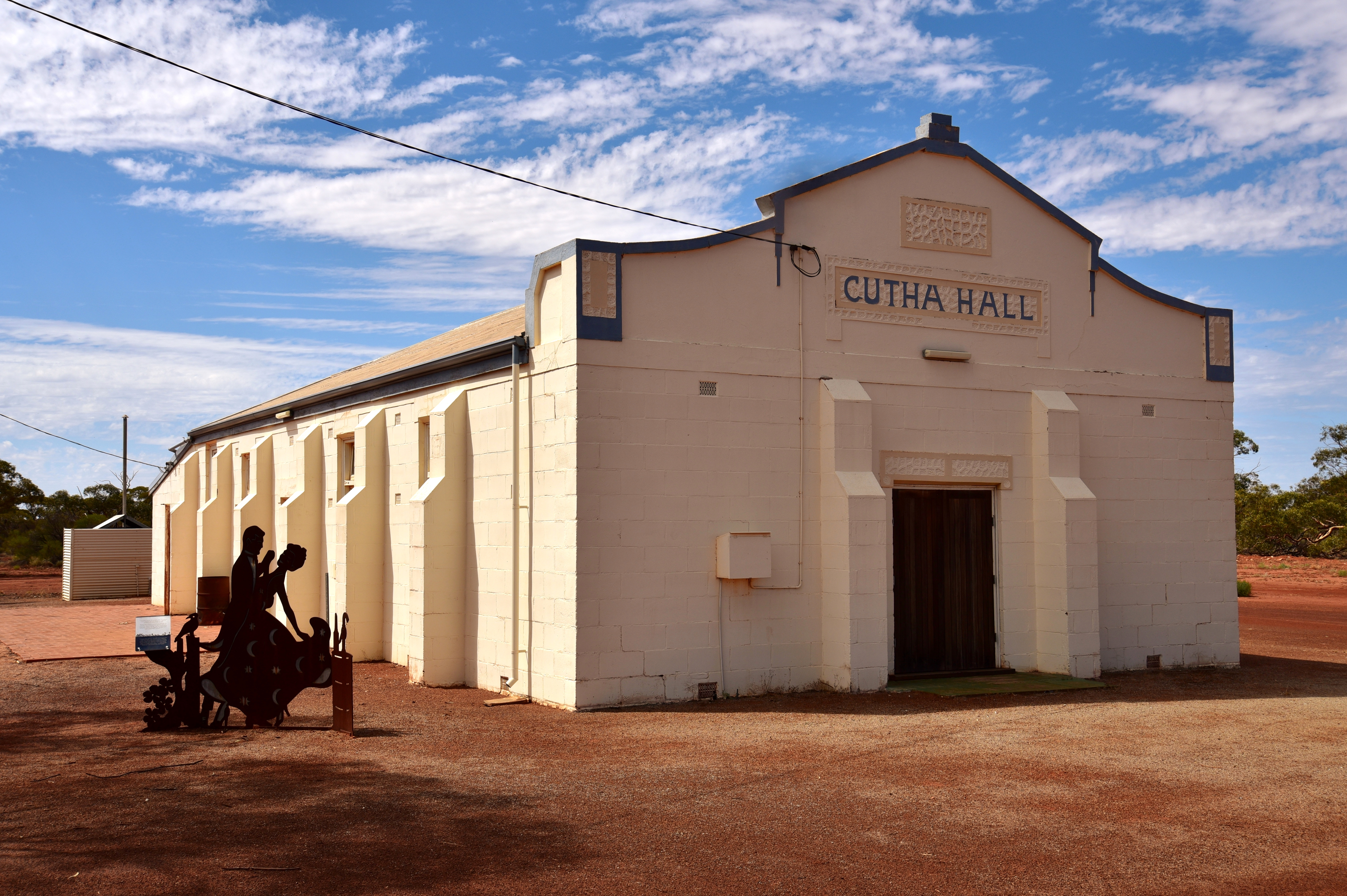
- Gutha Hall (erected 1937)

- Coordinates: 28.989°S 115.844°E
- Country: Australia
- State: Western Australia
- LGA(s): Shire of Morawa
- Location: 440 km (270 mi) N of Perth; 171 km (106 mi) SE of Geraldton; 32 km (20 mi) N of Morawa
- Established: 1914

Government
  - State electorate(s): Moore
  - Federal division(s): Durack

Area
  - Total: 643.1 km^{2} (248.3 sq mi)
- Elevation: 253 m (830 ft)

Population
  - Total(s): 41 (SAL 2021)
- Postcode: 6623

Gutha is a townsite in the Mid West region of Western Australia, 32 kilometres (20 mi) north of Morawa.

The first Europeans to pass through the Gutha area were government Assistant Surveyor Augustus Charles Gregory and Francis Thomas Gregory (both attached to the department of the Surveyor-General) and their brother Henry Churchman Gregory, on a public-private funded expedition to search for new agricultural land beyond the settled areas. They passed 5 km (3 mi) north of Gutha on 8 September 1846, on their way to the Irwin River.

In 1913 it was decided to establish a railway siding there, 26 km (16 mi) north of Morawa on the Wongan Hills to Mullewa railway line. The district surveyor suggested the name "Muthingutha", the Aboriginal name of a nearby rockhole. This was shortened to Gutha by the Lands Department, and Gutha siding was established in 1915. It was gazetted as a townsite in 1914.

The surrounding areas produce wheat and other cereal crops. The town was a receiving site for Cooperative Bulk Handling until 1 February 2019.
