= Koolanooka, Western Australia =

Koolanooka
- Town
- Coordinates: 29.267°S 116.067°E
- Country: Australia
- State: Western Australia
- LGA(s): Shire of Morawa
- Location: 361 km (224 mi) N of Perth; 10 km (6.2 mi) SE of Morawa
- Established: 1916

Government
  - State electorate(s): Moore
  - Federal division(s): Durack

Area
  - Total: 667.6 km^{2} (257.8 sq mi)
- Elevation: 280 m (920 ft)

Population
  - Total(s): 22 (SAL 2021)
- Postcode: 6623

Koolanooka is a small town in the Mid West region of Western Australia. It is situated between Morawa and Perenjori just off the Mullewa-Wubin road. At the 2006 census, Koolanooka had a population of 46.

In 1932 the Wheat Pool of Western Australia announced that the town would have two grain elevators, each fitted with an engine, installed at the railway siding.

== Name ==
Originating as a station on the Mullewa to Wongan Hills railway line, it was initially known as Bowgada when it was planned in 1913. The name Bowgada was taken from the pastoral station located nearby. Shortly before the line was opened in 1914 the name changed to Koolanooka and the next station south on the railway line was named Bowgada instead. The townsite was gazetted in 1916.

The town takes its name from the nearby Koolanooka Spring. The word is Aboriginal in origin and means place of plenty wild turkeys.

== Iron ore mining ==
An iron ore mine was opened in the area in 1965 along with the associated railway spur line, powerhouse, port facilities at Geraldton and housing for workers in Morawa.

The original 1966 Koolanooka iron mine was the first iron ore exporting mine in Western Australia.

In 2006 iron ore mining was re-commencing at the location.

== Transport ==
It has a railway station on the narrow gauge, originally Western Australian Government Railways now Arc Infrastructure network, on what was known as the Mullewa line.

=== Adjacent railway stations ===
- Morawa (north)
- Perenjori (south)
