= Morawa, Western Australia =

Morawa
- Town
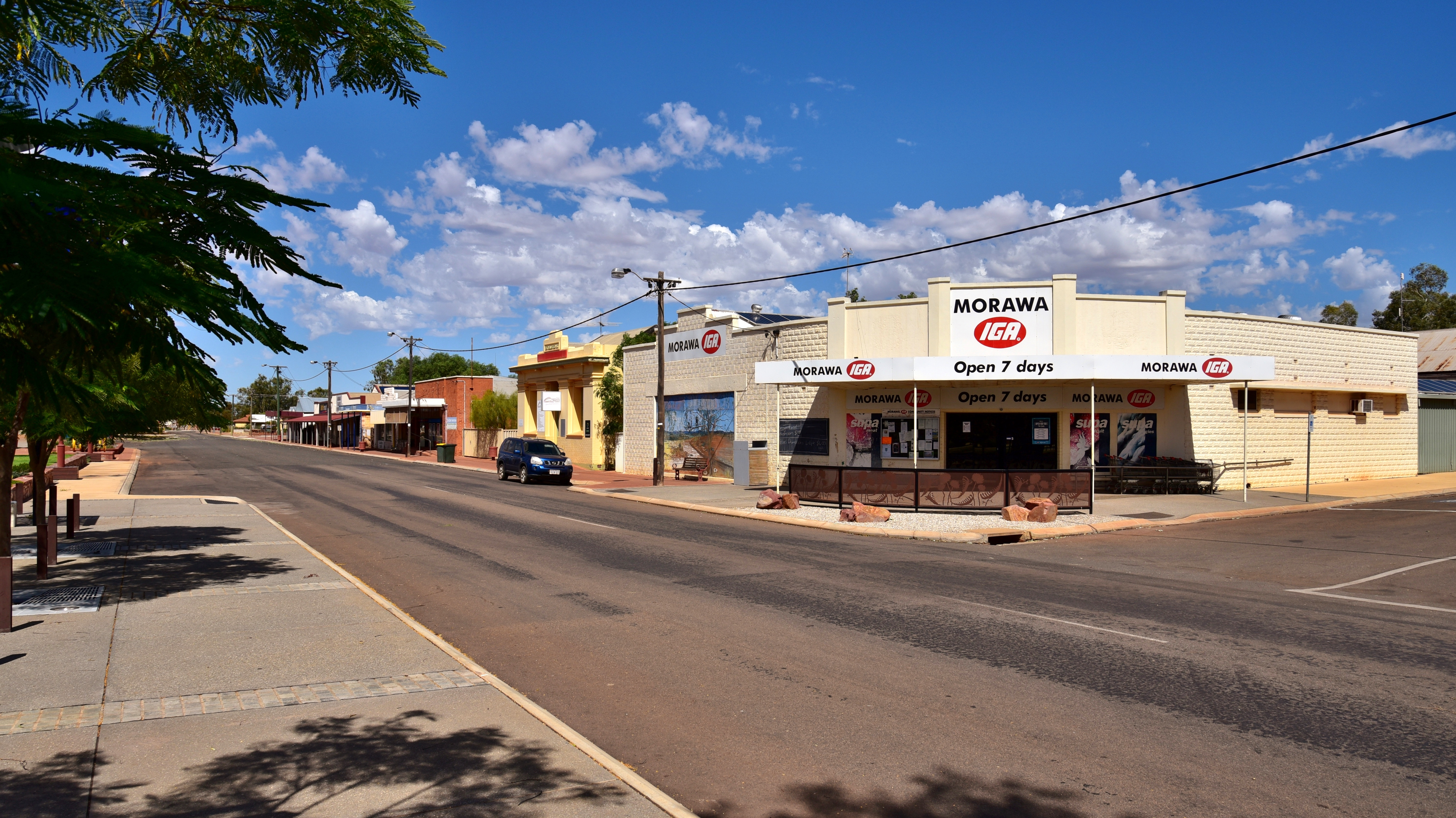
- Winfield Street, Morawa, 2018

- Interactive map of Morawa
- Coordinates: 29°12′40″S 116°0′32″E
- Country: Australia
- State: Western Australia
- LGA: Shire of Morawa
- Location: 371 km (231 mi) north of Perth; 180 km (110 mi) east south east of Geraldton; 114 km (71 mi) east of Dongara
- Established: 1913

Government
  - State electorate: Moore
  - Federal division: Durack

Area
  - Total: 190.5 km^{2} (73.6 sq mi)
- Elevation: 274 m (899 ft)

Population
  - Total: 443 (UCL 2021)
- Postcode: 6623
- Mean max temp: 27.4 °C (81.3 °F)
- Mean min temp: 12.4 °C (54.3 °F)
- Annual rainfall: 332.8 mm (13.10 in)

Morawa is a town in the Mid West region of Western Australia. It is located within the Shire of Morawa, approximately 370 kilometres (230 mi) north of the state capital Perth, on the railway line between Wongan Hills and Mullewa.

== History ==
The name Morawa is an Indigenous Australian name; it probably derives from the Morowar, the local dialect's word for the dalgite. The name was first used on maps of the area in 1910, in reference to a rock hole. When the railway was being planned in 1913, it was decided to locate a siding at the location, and the name Morawa was chosen for it. The Lands Department then decided to establish a townsite there, and Morawa was gazetted in September 1913. In 1921 the Railways Department decided that Morawa was too similar to Mullewa and requested a name change. In response, the town's name was changed to Merkanooka in January 1922. However the Railway Department, which had pressed for the name change in the first place, did not rename the siding, and in June the town's name reverted to Morawa at the request of the townspeople.

In 1932 the Wheat Pool of Western Australia announced that the town would have two grain elevators, each fitted with an engine, installed at the railway siding.

Population growth in Morawa has been fairly stable since the 1990s, without much increase, possibly due to people moving out to the Perth metropolitan area. Farms had been amalgamating for a number of years for economic reasons and the larger farms required fewer staff.

== Farming ==
Morawa is primarily a farming town. The area supports a range of farming activities including wheat, sheep, cattle and sandalwood. The town is a receival site for Cooperative Bulk Handling.

== Biodiversity ==
The biodiversity of rangeland around Morawa has been reduced by land clearing, changed fire regimes, feral pests and weeds, and pastoralism but still remains an important characteristic of the region. The Department of Environment and Conservation (formerly CALM) has undertaken a biodiversity survey of the area encompassing Morawa. Sporadic ranges of hills are separated by large areas of land and many have evolved their own unique endemic species and biological communities. Some of these are associated only with the Banded Ironstone Formation rocks that are targeted for iron ore mining.

== Mining ==
5.1 million tonnes of haematite iron ore was taken from the Koolanooka Hills mine between 1966 and 1974.

Due to renewed international demand for iron ore, and dramatic increases in prices being paid, the iron ore deposits around Morawa have attracted interest from junior mining companies such as Midwest Corp., Mount Gibson Mining, Gindalbie Metals and Red River Resources. Midwest Corp has spent several million dollars on infrastructure including roadworks to, and weighbridge facilities at, Koolanooka Mine. It is currently (May 2006) trucking haematite fines (<6 millimetres particle size) left over as waste from the 1966–74 Western Mining iron ore operation. When the export to China of these several million tonnes is complete, Midwest Corp plans to exploit further haematite discoveries on their leases (pending environmental assessment and approval). Substantial quantities of magnetite ore are also understood to exist on their holdings. Mount Gibson Mining also holds mining tenements at Koolanooka South, with reserves of magnetite ore. Magnetite mining operations would require the construction of a concentrator plant and either a rail link or magnetite slurry pipeline from Morawa to the port of Geraldton or to a new port to be built at Oakajee (north of Geraldton). Red River Resources hold tenements just 20 km south of Koolanooka at its Feral Prospect. They have currently identified 5 zones of iron enrichment in BIF ranging in strike length from 100m-500m.

The Karara Mining joint venture between Gindalbie Metals and Chinese steel producer, Ansteel, has substantial holdings 85 kilometres (53 mi) east of Morawa. Current 2015 reserves are 1,735 million tonnes of 36% iron. The low-grade magnetite iron ore is processed on site to produce a high-grade concentrate for use in steel making.

Magnetite concentrate from the mine is hauled to Geraldton on the Karara railway, a narrow gauge spur off the Mullewa to Northam rail line. The tracks from Karara to the junction at Tilley siding, 3.5 km north of Mullewa, were laid with dual gauge sleepers.

== Education ==
There are two schools in Morawa, the K–12 co-educational Morawa District High School, and the WA College of Agriculture – Morawa, an agricultural co-educational college with boarding facilities, for students in Years 10 to 12.

== Notable personality ==
A former Western Australian Premier, Carmen Lawrence, attended the Morawa Convent School.

== Climate ==
Morawa features a semi-arid climate with hot dry summers and mild to cool, slightly wetter winters.

Climate data for Morawa Airport
Month	Jan	Feb	Mar	Apr	May	Jun	Jul	Aug	Sep	Oct	Nov	Dec	Year
Record high °C (°F)	47.2 (117.0)	47.7 (117.9)	43.6 (110.5)	40.2 (104.4)	35.0 (95.0)	28.6 (83.5)	28.9 (84.0)	35.1 (95.2)	38.2 (100.8)	41.2 (106.2)	45.0 (113.0)	46.8 (116.2)	47.7 (117.9)
Mean daily maximum °C (°F)	37.6 (99.7)	37.0 (98.6)	33.5 (92.3)	29.0 (84.2)	24.1 (75.4)	20.1 (68.2)	18.9 (66.0)	20.4 (68.7)	23.5 (74.3)	28.4 (83.1)	32.1 (89.8)	35.6 (96.1)	28.4 (83.1)
Daily mean °C (°F)	28.6 (83.5)	28.7 (83.7)	25.6 (78.1)	21.7 (71.1)	17.2 (63.0)	13.9 (57.0)	12.3 (54.1)	13.4 (56.1)	15.4 (59.7)	19.7 (67.5)	23.4 (74.1)	26.4 (79.5)	20.5 (68.9)
Mean daily minimum °C (°F)	19.9 (67.8)	20.4 (68.7)	18.3 (64.9)	14.4 (57.9)	10.4 (50.7)	7.6 (45.7)	6.3 (43.3)	6.6 (43.9)	7.9 (46.2)	11.2 (52.2)	14.5 (58.1)	17.7 (63.9)	12.9 (55.2)
Record low °C (°F)	11.0 (51.8)	11.3 (52.3)	8.7 (47.7)	5.0 (41.0)	0.0 (32.0)	−1.9 (28.6)	−1.1 (30.0)	−0.2 (31.6)	0.6 (33.1)	2.5 (36.5)	4.4 (39.9)	7.0 (44.6)	−1.9 (28.6)
Average precipitation mm (inches)	18.9 (0.74)	18.7 (0.74)	19.9 (0.78)	17.4 (0.69)	34.6 (1.36)	43.1 (1.70)	46.1 (1.81)	37.0 (1.46)	21.1 (0.83)	9.4 (0.37)	10.7 (0.42)	12.4 (0.49)	288.0 (11.34)
Average precipitation days	2.5	2.9	3.3	3.3	6.6	10.8	13.3	11.2	6.6	3.8	2.9	2.4	69.6
