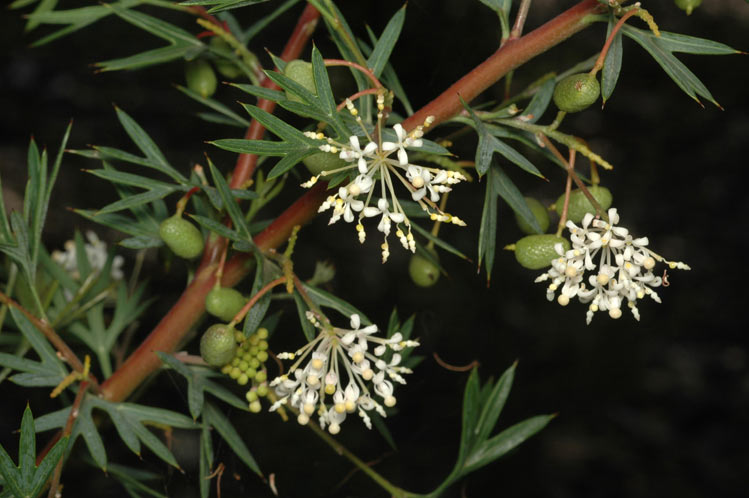
- In Kings Park, Perth

Conservation status
- Declared rare (DEC)

Scientific classification
- Kingdom: Plantae
- Clade: Tracheophytes
- Clade: Angiosperms
- Clade: Eudicots
- Order: Proteales
- Family: Proteaceae
- Genus: Grevillea
- Species: G. phanerophlebia

Binomial name
- Grevillea phanerophlebia Diels

= Grevillea phanerophlebia =

Species of shrub endemic to Western Australia

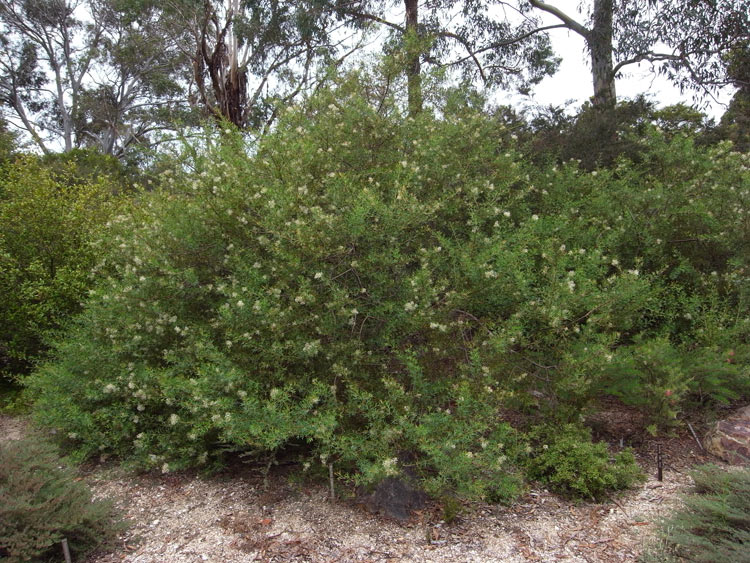
Habit, in the Australian National Botanic Gardens

Grevillea phanerophlebia, commonly known as the prominent vein grevillea and the vein leaf grevillea, is a species of flowering plant in the family Proteaceae and is endemic to a restricted part of the south-west of Western Australia. It is an erect, spreading or straggly shrub with divided leaves, the lobes linear, and white and cream-coloured to yellow flowers.

== Description ==
Grevillea phanerophlebia is an erect, spreading or straggly shrub that typically grows to a height of 0.9–1.5 m (2 ft 11 in – 4 ft 11 in) its branchlets moderately hairy. Its leaves are 25–35 mm (0.98–1.38 in) long, 30–50 mm (1.2–2.0 in) wide and fan-shaped in outline. The leaves are divided with three lobes that are often divided again, the end lobes narrowly triangular to almost linear, 10–25 mm (0.39–0.98 in) long, 1.5–2.5 mm (0.059–0.098 in) wide and sharply pointed. The lower surface of the leaves is sparsely hairy. The flowers are arranged in an almost spherical to dome-shaped cluster and are white and cream-coloured to yellow with a white style, the pistil 3.5–3.9 mm (0.14–0.15 in) long. It mainly blooms in August or September and the fruit is an oblong to elliptic follicle 8–12 mm (0.31–0.47 in) long.

== Taxonomy ==
Grevillea phanerophlebia was first formally described in 1904 by Ludwig Diels in Ernst Georg Pritzel's Botanische Jahrbücher für Systematik, Pflanzengeschichte und Pflanzengeographie from specimens he collected near Mingenew. The specific epithet (phanerophlebia) means "visible or obvious veins".

== Distribution and habitat ==
Prominent vein grevillea grows in scrub or heath on sandplain and has been recorded near Mingenew, Mullewa and Eradu in the Avon Wheatbelt and Geraldton Sandplains bioregions. It grows in association with Waitzia nitida, Acacia saligna, Acacia acuminata, Allocasuarina campestris, Hakea erinacea, Mesomelaena sp., Austrostipa elegantissima, Aristida holathera, Bonamia rosea, Grevillea amplexans and Grevillea biternata.

== Conservation status ==
This grevillea is listed as "Threatened" by the Western Australian Government Department of Biodiversity, Conservation and Attractions, meaning that it is in danger of extinction. In 2001, an "interim recovery plan" was prepared for the species. The main threats to the species were listed as poor regeneration, weed invasion, rail maintenance activities, inappropriate fire regimes, chemical drift, drought, grazing by rabbits, and recreation activities. At that time, the only known surviving population was near Mingenew, and was thought to contain only juvenile plants.

== Use in horticulture ==
Despite being rare in the wild, this grevillea has been in cultivation since the 1980s in New South Wales and Victoria. G. phanerophlebia is commercially available and sold as a waterwise informal hedge, barrier or border plant that can be grown in areas with hot overhead sun suitable in dry soils and able to tolerate light frost.

== See also ==
- List of Grevillea species
