= Acacia flabellifolia =

Conservation status
- Priority Three — Poorly Known Taxa (DEC)

Scientific classification
- Kingdom: Plantae
- Clade: Tracheophytes
- Clade: Angiosperms
- Clade: Eudicots
- Clade: Rosids
- Order: Fabales
- Family: Fabaceae
- Subfamily: Caesalpinioideae
- Clade: Mimosoid clade
- Genus: Acacia
- Species: A. flabellifolia

Binomial name
- Acacia flabellifolia W.Fitzg.
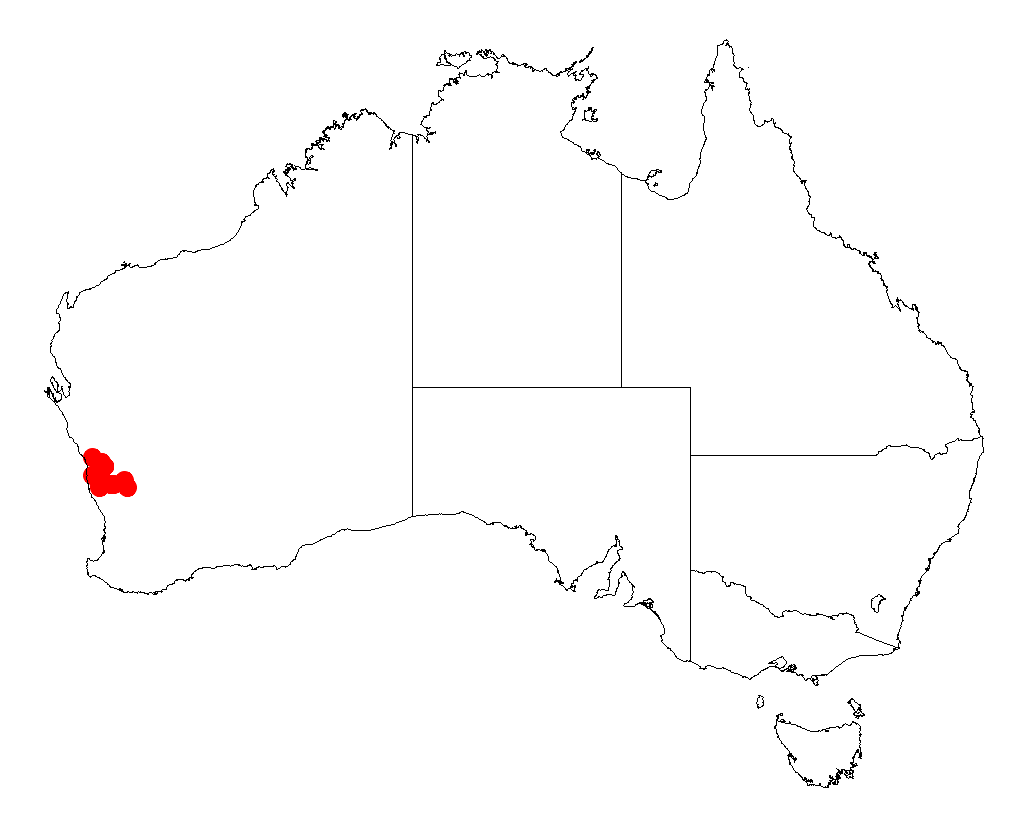
- Occurrence data from AVH

Synonyms
- Racosperma flabellifolium (W.Fitzg.) Pedley

Species of legume

Acacia flabellifolia is a species of flowering plant in the family Fabaceae and is endemic to the south-west of Western Australia. It is an erect, spreading, sharply pointed shrub with widely-spreading to ascending branchlets, phyllodes with one edge rounded and the other edge more or less parallel to the branchlet, spherical heads of flowers and tightly and irregularly coiled, thinly leathery pods.

== Description ==
Acacia flabellifolia is an erect, spreading, sharply pointed shrub that typically grows to a height of 0.4–1 m (1 ft 4 in – 3 ft 3 in), its end branchlets widely spreading to ascending, rather short, hairy and with coarse spines. Its phyllodes have one edge rounded and the other edge more or less parallel to the branchlet, 6–15 mm (0.24–0.59 in) long, 4–9 mm (0.16–0.35 in) wide and broadest near or below the middle. The flowers are borne in spherical heads in axils on peduncles 4–6 mm (0.16–0.24 in) long, each head with 15 to 17 flowers. The pods are tightly and somewhat irregularly coiled so that they cannot be straightened out, 6–12 mm (0.24–0.47 in) long, 4–7 mm (0.16–0.28 in) wide, thinly leathery and glabrous

== Taxonomy ==
Acacia flabellifolia was first formally described in 1904 by the botanist William Vincent Fitzgerald in the Journal of the West Australian Natural History Society from specimens he found near Arrino in 1903. The specific epithet (flabellifolia) means 'small fan-leaved'.

This wattle is a part of the Acacia pravifolia group and is most closely related to Acacia scalena. It also resembles Acacia dilatata but is less closely related.

== Distribution and habitat ==
This species of wattle grows on low hills and ridges in rocky loam and gravelly soils near Yandanooka and Watheroo in open woodland in the Avon Wheatbelt and Geraldton Sandplains biogerions of south-western Western Australia.

== Conservation status ==
Acacia flabellifolia is listed as "Priority Three" by the Government of Western Australia Department of Parks and Wildlife, meaning that it is poorly known and known from only a few locations but is not under imminent threat.

== See also ==
- List of Acacia species
