= List of State Register of Heritage Places in the Shire of Mingenew =

List of heritage sites in Western Australia

The State Register of Heritage Places is maintained by the Heritage Council of Western Australia. As of 2026, 62 places are heritage-listed in the Shire of Mingenew, of which three are on the State Register of Heritage Places.

== List ==
The Western Australian State Register of Heritage Places, as of 2026, lists the following three state registered places within the Shire of Mingenew:

Place name	Place #	Street number	Street name	Suburb or town	Co-ordinates	Notes & former names	Photo
Mingenew Police Group	1589	31	William Street	Mingenew	29.193518°S 115.440477°E	Mingenew Police Station and Residence (former), Police Residence	
Mingenew Police Station	19005	15	William Street	Mingenew	29.193325°S 115.440599°E	Mingenew Police Station and former Courthouse	
Mingenew Police Residence	25932	31	William Street	Mingenew	29.193711°S 115.440477°E	Police Station and Quarters	
