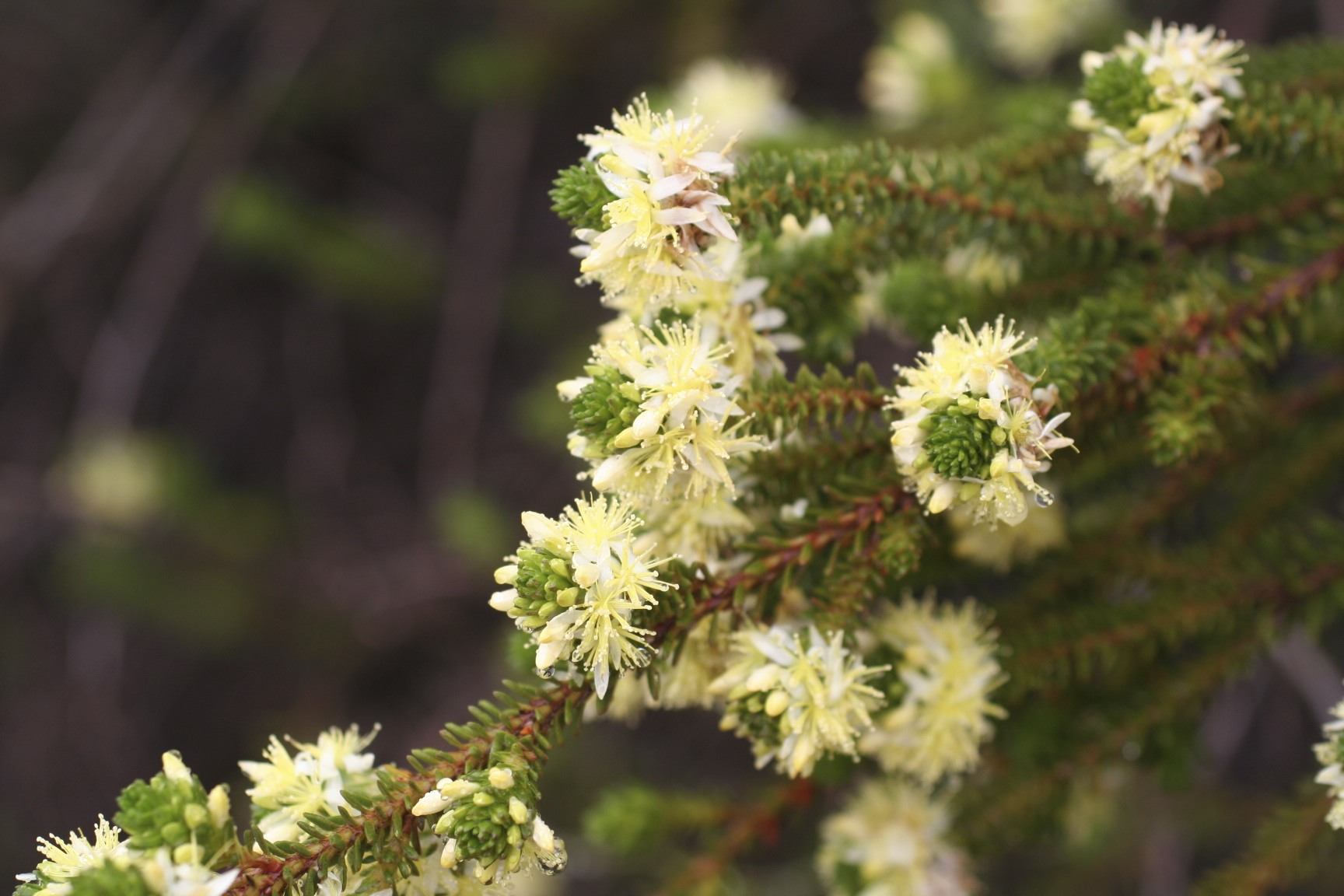

Scientific classification
- Kingdom: Plantae
- Clade: Tracheophytes
- Clade: Angiosperms
- Clade: Eudicots
- Clade: Rosids
- Order: Myrtales
- Family: Myrtaceae
- Genus: Calytrix
- Species: C. drummondii

Binomial name
- Calytrix drummondii (Meisn.) Craven

= Calytrix drummondii =

Species of flowering plant

Calytrix drummondii is a species of flowering plant in the myrtle family Myrtaceae and is endemic to the Geraldton Sandplains bioregion of Western Australia. It is a glabrous shrub with linear leaves, and yellow flowers with about 55 to 85 yellow stamens in several rows.

== Description ==
Calytrix drummondii is a glabrous shrub that typically grows to a height of up to 1 m (3 ft 3 in). Its leaves are linear, closely-spaced, 4–20 mm (0.16–0.79 in) long, 0.8–1 mm (0.031–0.039 in) wide and taper to a fine point, on a petiole 0.5–2 mm (0.020–0.079 in) long. The flowers are borne on a peduncle 6–8 mm (0.24–0.31 in) long, the floral tube 8–13 mm (0.31–0.51 in) long, with 8 to 10 ribs. The sepals are joined for a short distance at the base, the lobes broadly egg-shaped with the narrower end towards the base, 1.5–2.25 mm (0.059–0.089 in) long and wide, with an awn up to 15 mm (0.59 in) long. The petals are yellow, egg-shaped to narrowly elliptic, 6–8 mm (0.24–0.31 in) long and 3.0–3.25 mm (0.118–0.128 in) wide. There are about 55 to 85 yellow stamens 2.5–6 mm (0.098–0.236 in) long in usually 4 rows. Flowering occurs from November to January.

== Taxonomy ==
This species was first formally described in 1857 by Carl Meissner who gave it the name Calycothrix drummondii in the Journal of the Proceeding of the Linnean Society, Botany from specimens collected by James Drummond. In 1987, Lyndley Craven transferred the species to the genus Calytrix as C. drummondii. The specific epithet (drummondii) honours the collector of the type specimens.

== Distribution and habitat ==
Calytrix drummondii grows in sand in the Murchison River and Mingenew-Coorow districts in the Geraldton Sandplains bioregion of Western Australia.
