= Coalseam Conservation Park =

Park in Western Australia

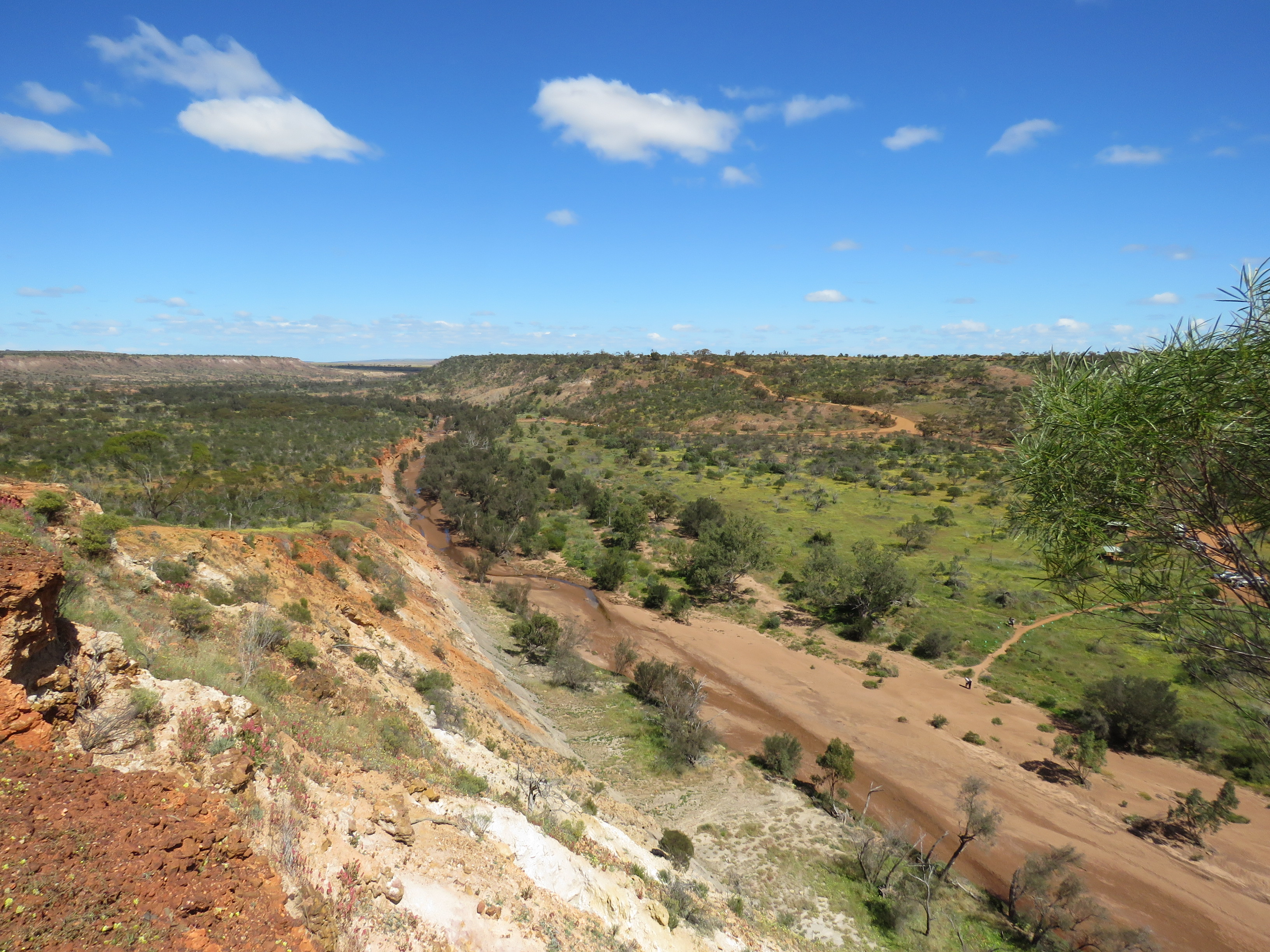
- Irwin River and Coalseam Conservation Park, seen from Irwin Lookout
- Interactive map of Coalseam Conservation Park
- Type: Conservation Park
- Location: Shire of Mingenew
- Coordinates: 28°57′25″S 115°32′52″E
- Area: 754 ha (1,860 acres)
- Administrator: Department of Biodiversity, Conservation and Attractions
- Website: parks.dpaw.wa.gov.au/park/coalseam

Coalseam Conservation Park is a conservation park in the Shire of Mingenew, in the Wheatbelt region of Western Australia, approximately 115 kilometres (71 mi) inland from Geraldton. The park is an important refuge for the threatened fauna and flora of the Wheatbelt region. It is renowned for its spectacular spring wildflowers. The park is also the site of the discovery of Western Australia's first coal deposits in 1846 and a rare example of coal being visible on the surface.

== Geology ==
Coalseam Conservation Park is one of the few places on Earth where coal can be seen on the surface. The Irwin River, which flows through the park, exposes a cross section of the local rock, with the Holmwood Shale at the bottom (280 million years old), the High Cliff sandstone (269 million years old) above, the Irwin River Coal Measures (265 million years old) next and the Victoria Plateau Sandstone (50 million years old) and the Laterite (40 million years old) on top.

== History ==
The area of what is now Coalseam Conservation Park holds strong traditional value for the Aboriginal people as a source for food and medicine, and artefacts from the time of indigenous occupation can be found in the park.

European occupation of the area began from 1839, when the Colony of Western Australia commenced a search for coal to support industrial development. In 1846, surveyor Augustus Charles Gregory, together with his brothers Francis Thomas and Henry Churcham, explored the area and found Western Australia's first coal seam at the banks of the Irwin River. Following this, the area was declared a reserve for mining purposes and it became the site of the colony's first coal mine.

The coal in the area was, however, of poor quality and uneconomic to mine, and mining was soon abandoned, with one remaining mine shaft still visible, the Johnson mine shaft. The area around the park was instead taken up by farmers, forcibly displacing the local Aboriginal people. The area of what is now the Coalseam Conservation Park was unsuitable for both wheat and sheep farming and its value as a retreat for native flora and fauna was eventually recognised. It became a nature reserve, administrated by the Shire of Mingenew, in 1978 and a conservation park in 1994.

== Flora and fauna ==
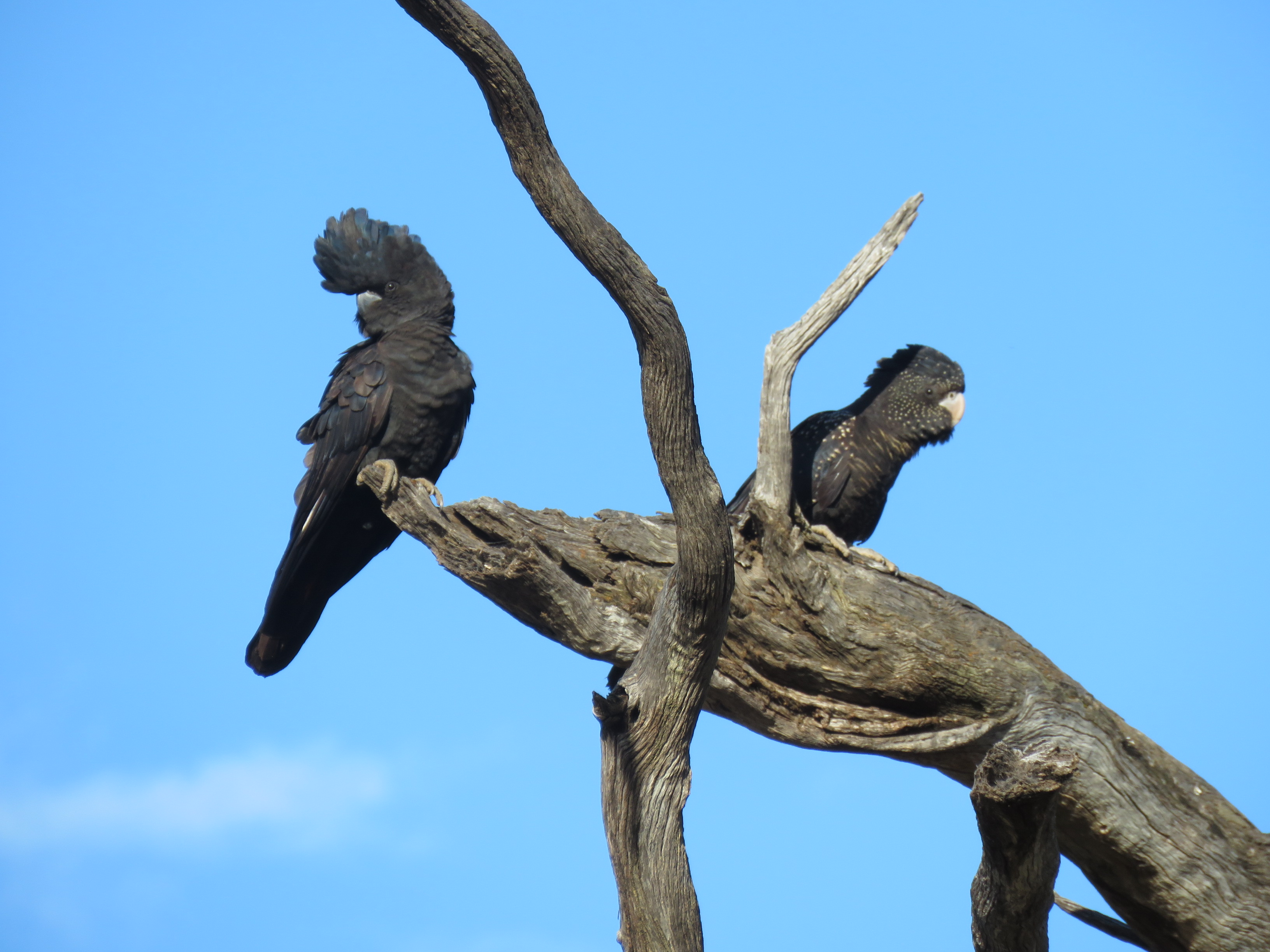
Red-tailed black cockatoos at Coalseam Conservation Park

Coalseam Conservation Park is considered to be one of the most spectacular wildflower areas of the Wheatbelt region of Western Australia, which grow predominantly in winter, with flowers appearing in early spring before dying in late spring, avoiding the harsh summer conditions.

The park has a range of birds that are easily observable during the day, while the park's mammals are predominantly nocturnal and the reptiles are more difficult to spot.

== Recreation ==
The park has two unpowered camping facilities, the Miners campground and the Breakaway overflow campground. Recreation areas are located at the Riverbend and Fossil recreation sites. The Irwin lookout offers views over the Irwin River while the Plateau Loop Trail, starting at the Miners campground, leads up to the park's plateau ridge.
