= Leioproctus macrodontus =

Scientific classification
- Kingdom: Animalia
- Phylum: Arthropoda
- Clade: Pancrustacea
- Class: Insecta
- Order: Hymenoptera
- Family: Colletidae
- Genus: Leioproctus
- Species: L. macrodontus

Binomial name
- Leioproctus macrodontus (Rayment, 1935)

Synonyms
- Paracolletes macrodontus Rayment, 1935

Species of bee

Leioproctus macrodontus, or Leioproctus (Hadrocolletes) macrodontus, is a species of bee in the family Colletidae and subfamily Colletinae. It is endemic to Australia. It was described by Australian entomologist Tarlton Rayment in 1935.

== Description ==
Male body length is about 12 mm. Integumental colouration is mainly black; the hair is white, through golden and amber, to grey and black.

== Distribution and habitat ==
The species occurs in south-west Western Australia. The type locality is Cottesloe.

== Behaviour ==
The adults are flying mellivores. Flowering plants visited by the bees include Hakea erinacea as well as Grevillea and Banksia species.

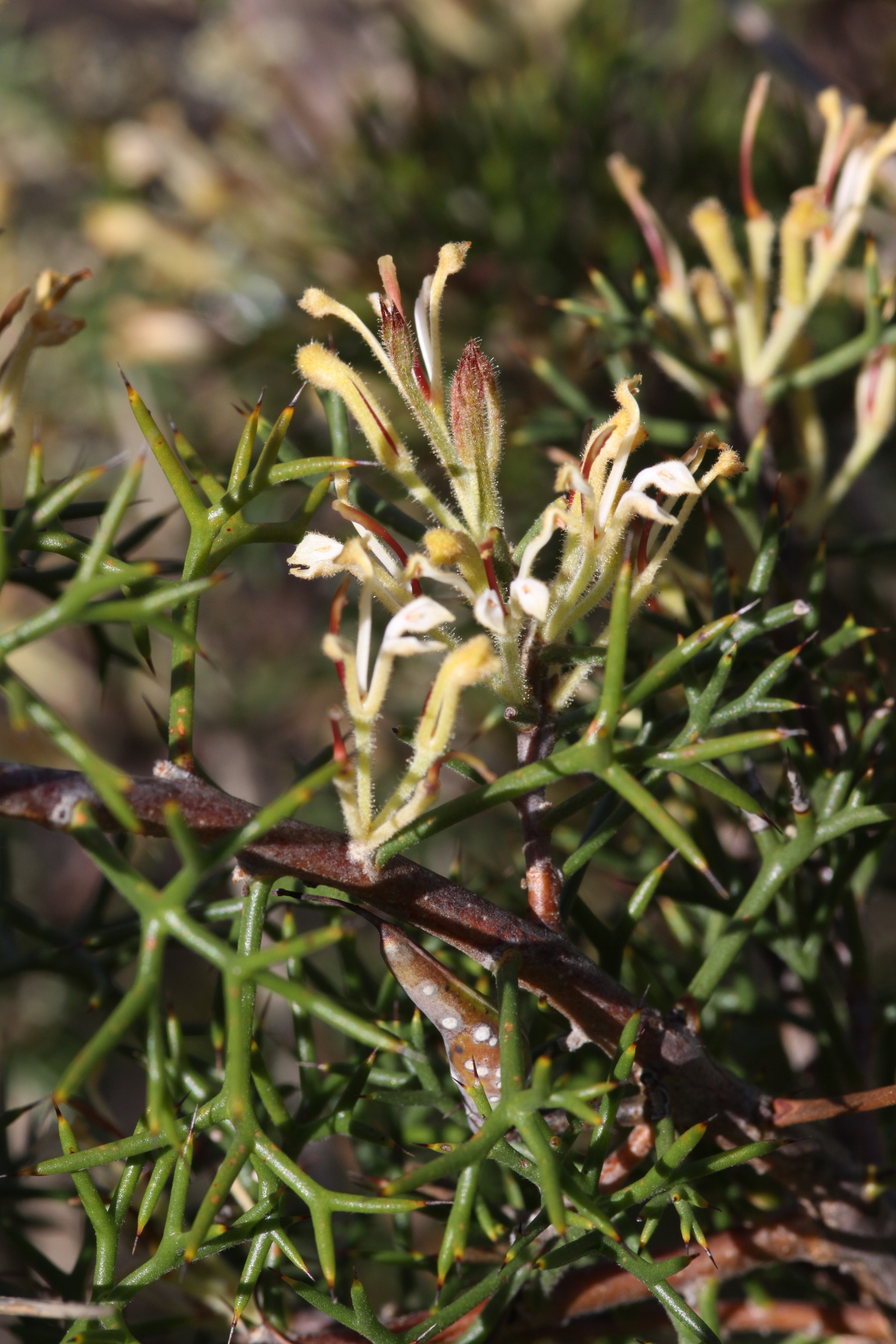
Hakea erinacea (hedgehog hakea), a forage plant of the bees
