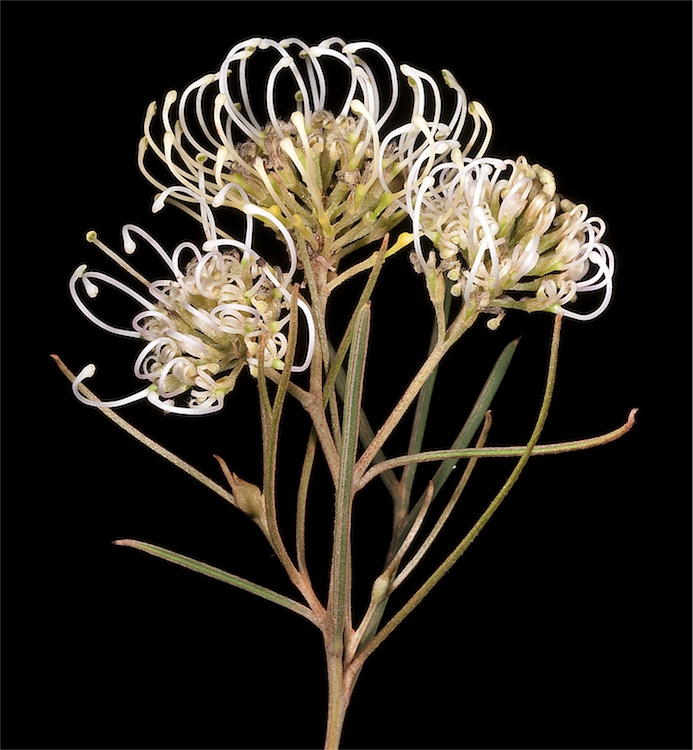
- Grevillea brachystachya near Mingenew

Conservation status
- Endangered (IUCN 3.1)

Scientific classification
- Kingdom: Plantae
- Clade: Embryophytes
- Clade: Tracheophytes
- Clade: Spermatophytes
- Clade: Angiosperms
- Clade: Eudicots
- Order: Proteales
- Family: Proteaceae
- Genus: Grevillea
- Species: G. brachystachya

Binomial name
- Grevillea brachystachya Meisn.

= Grevillea brachystachya =

Short-spiked grevillea

Species of shrub endemic to Western Australia

Grevillea brachystachya, commonly known as short-spiked grevillea, is a species of flowering plant in the family Proteaceae and is endemic to the south-west of Western Australia. It is a bushy shrub with linear leaves and more or less spherical clusters of cream-coloured to greenish flowers.

== Description ==
Grevillea brachystachya is a bushy shrub that typically grows to a height of 0.6 to 2 metres (2 to 7 ft) and usually has silky-hairy branchlets. The leaves are linear, 20–150 mm (0.79–5.91 in) long and 1–2 mm (0.039–0.079 in) wide with two longitudinal grooves on the lower surface. The flowers are arranged in more or less spherical groups on a rachis 4–8 mm (0.16–0.31 in) long, and are cream-coloured to greenish-cream. The pistil is 12–17 mm (0.47–0.67 in) long and glabrous. Flowering occurs from June to November and the fruit is a glabrous, oval follicle 17–21 mm (0.67–0.83 in) long.

== Taxonomy ==
Grevillea brachystachya was first formally described in 1848 by Carl Meissner in Johann Georg Christian Lehmann's Plantae Preissianae from specimens collected by James Drummond in the Swan River Colony. The specific epithet (brachystachya) means "short flower spike".

== Distribution and habitat ==
Short-spiked grevillea usually grows in woodland or shrubland and is found in scattered populations between Miling, Wongan Hills and the Murchison River in the Avon Wheatbelt, Geraldton Sandplains and Yalgoo biogeographic regions of south-western Western Australia.

== Conservation status ==
Grevillea brachystachya is listed as endangered on the IUCN Red List of Threatened Species. It has a severely fragmented range and an area of occupancy (AOO) of less than 100 km^{2} (39 sq mi). There is a continuing decline of the quality of habitat and the number of mature individuals of the species due to habitat clearing for agriculture, road development and mining. Populations that occur on roadside verges are threatened by weed invasion and roadside verge clearing.
