= Pimelea sessilis =

Scientific classification
- Kingdom: Plantae
- Clade: Tracheophytes
- Clade: Angiosperms
- Clade: Eudicots
- Clade: Rosids
- Order: Malvales
- Family: Thymelaeaceae
- Genus: Pimelea
- Species: P. sessilis

Binomial name
- Pimelea sessilis Rye

Species of flowering plant

Pimelea sessilis is a species of flowering plant in the family Thymelaeaceae and is endemic to the west of Western Australia. It is an erect shrub with sessile, elliptic leaves, and heads of white or cream coloured flowers surrounded by 4 broadly elliptic involucral bracts.

== Description ==
Pimelea sessilis is an erect shrub that typically grows to a height of 15–40 cm (5.9–15.7 in) with dense tufts of hair in its leaf axils. The leaves are sessile to almost stem-clasping, narrowly elliptic to almost round, 6–15 mm (0.24–0.59 in) long and 6–9 mm (0.24–0.35 in) wide. The flowers are arranged in heads on a peduncle 5–25 mm (0.20–0.98 in) long, surrounded by 4 broadly elliptic to almost round involucral bracts 7–15 mm (0.28–0.59 in) long and 6–14 mm (0.24–0.55 in) wide, each flower on a pedicel 1.5–2.0 mm (0.059–0.079 in) long. The flower tube is 8–11 mm (0.31–0.43 in) long, the sepals 3–5 mm (0.12–0.20 in) long, and the stamens are longer than the sepals. Flowering occurs from August to October.

== Taxonomy ==
Pimelea sessilis was first formally described in 1988 by Barbara Lynette Rye in the journal Nuytsia from specimens collected near Kalbarri in 1985. The specific epithet (sessilis) means "sessile".

== Distribution and habitat ==
Pimelea sessilis grows in shrubland between Tamala Station and Yandanooka in the Avon Wheatbelt, Carnarvon, Geraldton Sandplains and Yalgoo bioregions of Western Australia.

== Conservation status ==
Pimelea sessilis is listed as "not threatened" by the Government of Western Australia Department of Biodiversity, Conservation and Attractions.
