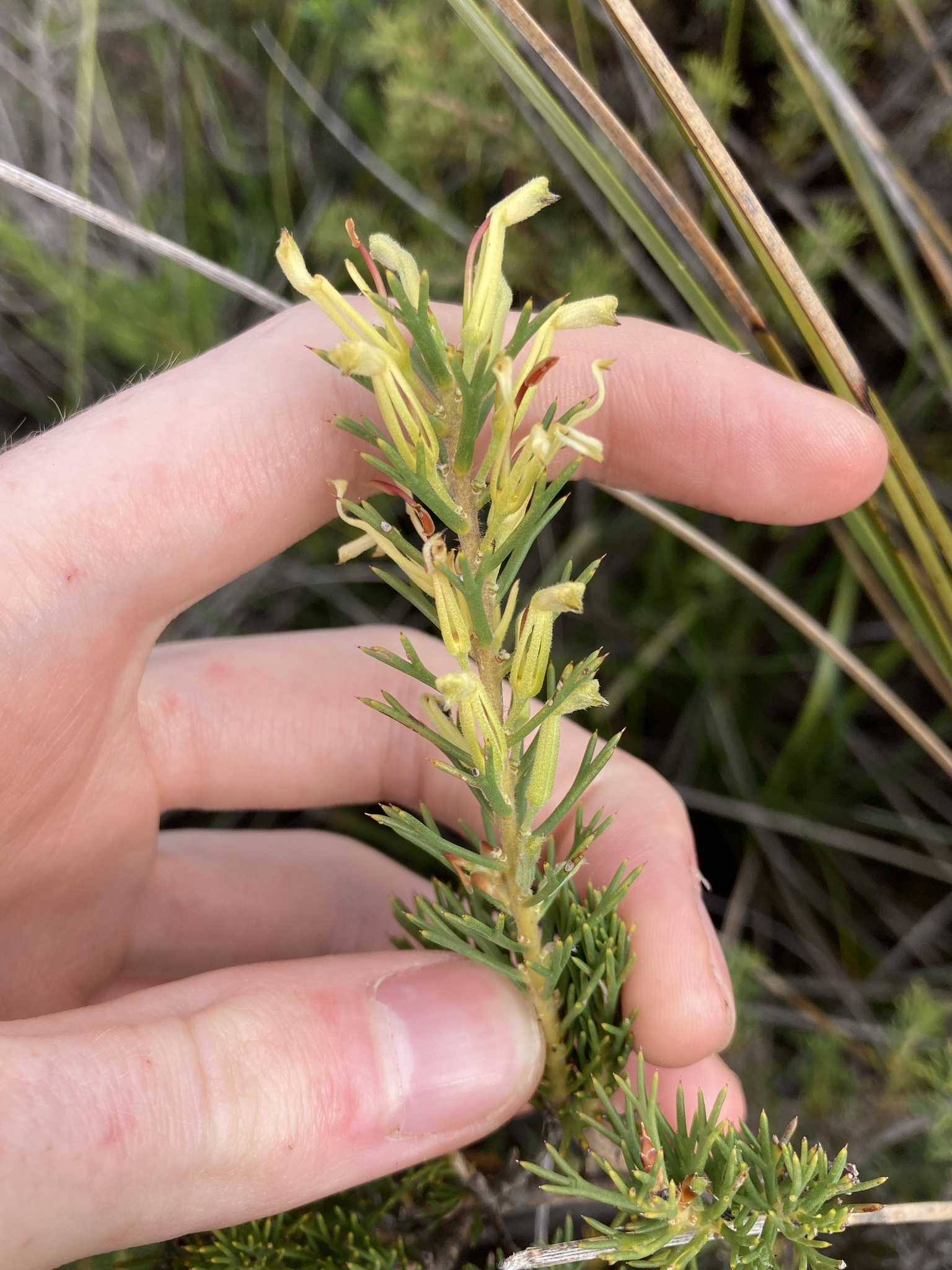

Conservation status
- Priority Three — Poorly Known Taxa (DEC)

Scientific classification
- Kingdom: Plantae
- Clade: Tracheophytes
- Clade: Angiosperms
- Clade: Eudicots
- Order: Proteales
- Family: Proteaceae
- Genus: Hakea
- Species: H. longiflora

Binomial name
- Hakea longiflora (Benth.) R.M.Barker
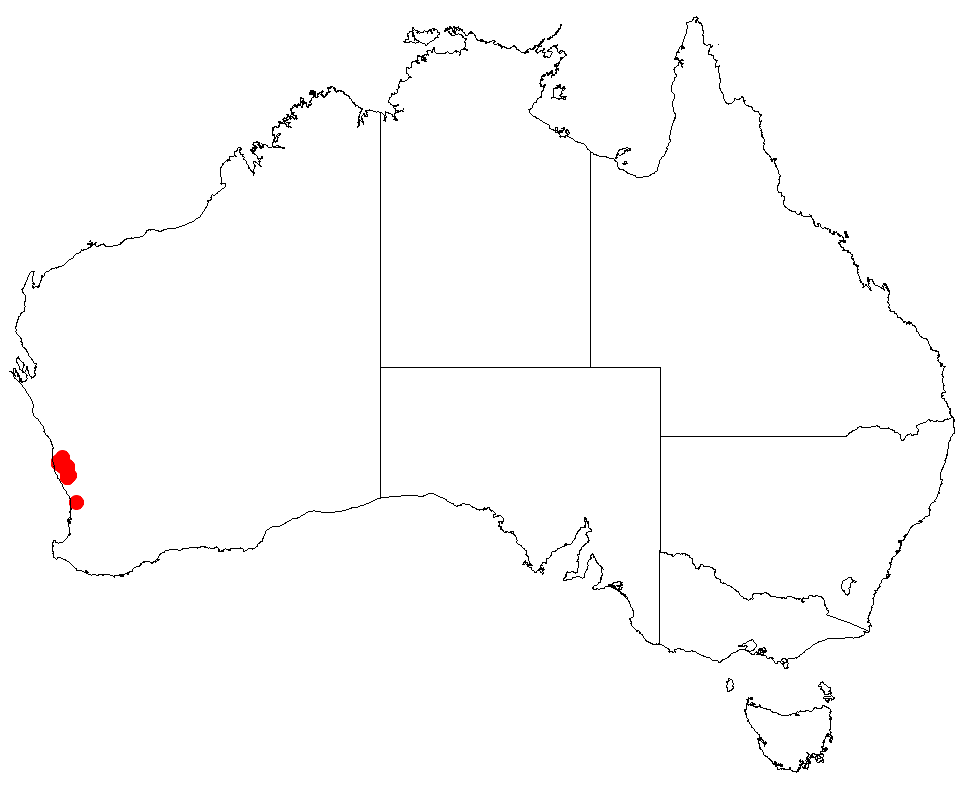
- Occurrence data from AVH

= Hakea longiflora =

Species of shrub endemic to Western Australia

Hakea longiflora is a species of small shrub in the family Proteaceae and is endemic to Western Australia. It has sharp, short, needle-like leaves with white flowers and a prominent red style.

== Description ==
Hakea longiflora is an upright shrub that typically grows to 0.6 to 0.75 metres (2 to 2 ft) high and forms a lignotuber. The evergreen compound-terete and rigid leaves have an undivided base that is 3 to 10 millimetres (0.118 to 0.394 in) in length and not grooved on lower surface. There are two or three ultimate segments with a length of 1 to 10 mm (0.039 to 0.394 in) and 0.8 to 1.5 mm (0.031 to 0.059 in) wide. It blooms from June to September and produces yellow flowers. Each simple inflorescence is composed of two flowers at different stages of development. It has a white perianth that is 6.5 to 12 mm (0.256 to 0.472 in) long and covered in matted hair. The smooth fruits that form later are covered in black blisters and have an obliquely narrowly ovate shape and a length of 18 to 25 mm (0.709 to 0.984 in) and a width of 6 to 7 mm (0.236 to 0.276 in) with a long beak. The seeds inside have a boomerang shape with a wing at the end and a length of 22 mm (0.866 in).

== Taxonomy ==
The species was first formally described by the botanist Robyn Mary Barker in 1990 as part of the work New species, new combinations and other name changes in Hakea (Proteaceae) as published in the Journal of the Adelaide Botanic Gardens. The only synonym is Hakea erinacea var. longiflora as described by George Bentham in 1870.

The specific epithet is said to be derived from the Latin words longus meaning "long" and florus meaning "flower", referring to the long flowers of this plant compared to Hakea erinacea which Bentham thought this species was a variety of. The proper word for "flower" in classical and botanical Latin is however flos.

== Distribution ==
It is endemic to an area between Dandaragan and Coorow in the Wheatbelt region of Western Australia where it is found in and among breakaways growing in sandy-loamy-gravelly soils. It is usually in low open heath land communities often over sandstone. Although the species has a small range it is quite common within the area.
