= Acacia adnata =

- Fruiting pods in the Wattle Garden, Kings Park

Scientific classification
- Kingdom: Plantae
- Clade: Tracheophytes
- Clade: Angiosperms
- Clade: Eudicots
- Clade: Rosids
- Order: Fabales
- Family: Fabaceae
- Subfamily: Caesalpinioideae
- Clade: Mimosoid clade
- Genus: Acacia
- Species: A. adnata

Binomial name
- Acacia adnata F.Muell.

Synonyms
- Racosperma adnatum (F.Muell.) Pedley

Species of legume

Habit in the Wattle Garden in Kings Park

Acacia adnata is a species of flowering plant in the family Fabaceae and is endemic to a small area in the south-west of Western Australia. It is a shrub with sessile, oblong, sharply pointed phyllodes, and leathery, linear pods. The flowers are unknown.

== Description ==
Acacia adnata is an erect shrub with sessile, asymmetric, oblong phyllodes 4–5 mm (0.16–0.20 in) long, 2–3 mm (0.079–0.118 in) wide and sharply pointed, with 3 or 4 raised veins. There are needle-shaped stipules 1–2.5 mm (0.039–0.098 in) long at the base of the phyllodes. The flowers are borne in spherical heads, but flowering times are unknown. The pods are leathery, linear, about 50 mm (2.0 in) long and 4 mm (0.16 in) wide containing round seeds about 2.5 mm (0.098 in) long with an aril near the end.

== Taxonomy ==
Acacia adnata was first formally described by the botanist Ferdinand von Mueller in 1882 in the Australasian Chemist and Druggist.

There appears to be no type specimen in the Melbourne Herbarium and no modern collections of A. adnata that agree with the type. The description in the Flora of Australia is based on Mueller's description.

The specific epithet adnata means "joined together", and refers to the base of the phyllode.

== Distribution ==
Mueller collected the type specimen "near the Irwin River".

== See also ==
- List of Acacia species
