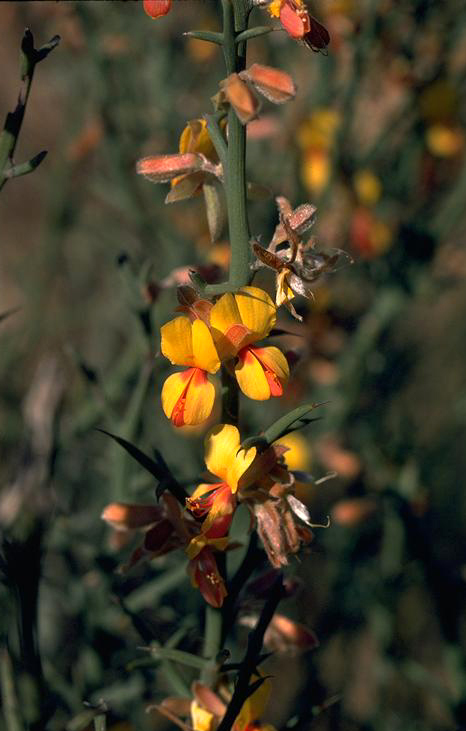

Scientific classification
- Kingdom: Plantae
- Clade: Tracheophytes
- Clade: Angiosperms
- Clade: Eudicots
- Clade: Rosids
- Order: Fabales
- Family: Fabaceae
- Subfamily: Faboideae
- Genus: Jacksonia
- Species: J. fasciculata

Binomial name
- Jacksonia fasciculata Meisn.

Synonyms
- Jacksonia stricta Meisn.; Piptomeris stricta (Meisn.) Greene

= Jacksonia fasciculata =

Species of legume

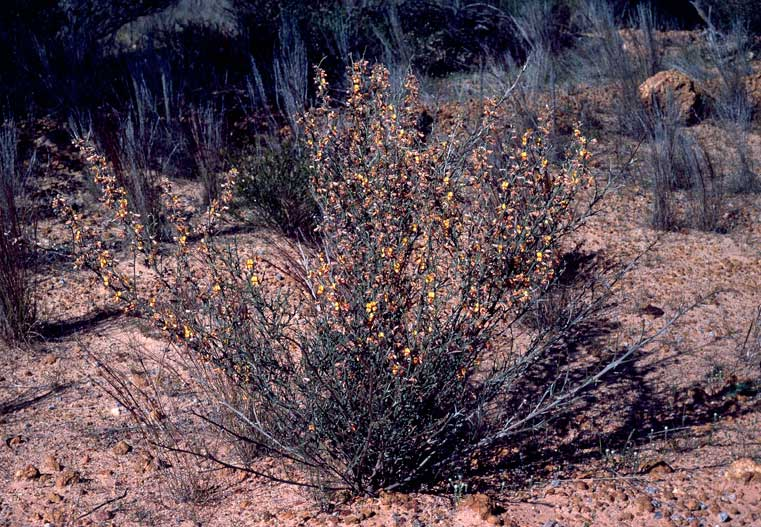
Habit, east of Eneabba

Jacksonia fasciculata is a species of flowering plant in the family Fabaceae and is endemic to the south-west of Western Australia. It is an erect, spiny shrub with sharply-pointed end-branches, leaves reduced to scales and orange flowers with red markings in the axils of branches.

== Description ==
Jacksonia fasciculata is an erect, spiny shrub that typically grows up to 0.6–3 m (2 ft 0 in – 9 ft 10 in) high and 0.6–22 m (2 ft 0 in – 72 ft 2 in) wide. It has greyish green branches, the end branches short with sharply-pointed ends, sometimes with two or three spines, its leaves reduced to lance-shaped scales, 1.0–4.5 mm (0.039–0.177 in) long and 1.0–2.2 mm (0.039–0.087 in) wide. The flowers are arranged in clusters in the axils of branches, each flower on a pedicel 1.2–2.3 mm (0.047–0.091 in) long, with bracteoles 2.5–4.5 mm (0.098–0.177 in) long and 0.5–0.8 mm (0.020–0.031 in) wide but that fall off as the flowers open. The floral tube is 0.8–1.1 mm (0.031–0.043 in) long and the sepals are membraneous, with upper lobes 5.7–8.6 mm (0.22–0.34 in) long, 1.4–2.3 mm (0.055–0.091 in) wide and joined at the base. The standard petal is orange with red markings, 5.2–7 mm (0.20–0.28 in) long and 5.5–7.6 mm (0.22–0.30 in) deep, the wings orange with red markings, 2.4–3.4 mm (0.094–0.134 in) long, and the keel is red, 5.5–6.1 mm (0.22–0.24 in) long and 2.5–4.3 mm (0.098–0.169 in) deep. The stamens have pink filaments and are 4.2–8 mm (0.17–0.31 in) long. Flowering occurs from June to November, and the fruit is a membranous, hairy pod 3.8–4.3 mm (0.15–0.17 in) long and 2.8–3.0 mm (0.11–0.12 in) wide.

== Taxonomy ==
Jacksonia fasciculata was first formally described in 1848 by Carl Meissner in Lehmann's Plantae Preissianae from specimens collected near the Swan River by James Drummond. The specific epithet (fasciculata) means 'clustered', referring to the flowers.

== Distribution and habitat ==
This species of Jacksonia grows in heath, shrubland or low woodland between Mingenew and Cunderdin with an outlier near the Murchison River, in the Avon Wheatbelt, Geraldton Sandplains, Swan Coastal Plain bioregions of south-western Western Australia.

== Conservation status ==
This species is listed as "not threatened" by the Government of Western Australia Department of Biodiversity, Conservation and Attractions.
