= Acacia ampliata =

Conservation status
- Priority One — Poorly Known Taxa (DEC)

Scientific classification
- Kingdom: Plantae
- Clade: Tracheophytes
- Clade: Angiosperms
- Clade: Eudicots
- Clade: Rosids
- Order: Fabales
- Family: Fabaceae
- Subfamily: Caesalpinioideae
- Clade: Mimosoid clade
- Genus: Acacia
- Species: A. ampliata

Binomial name
- Acacia ampliata R.S.Cowan & Maslin
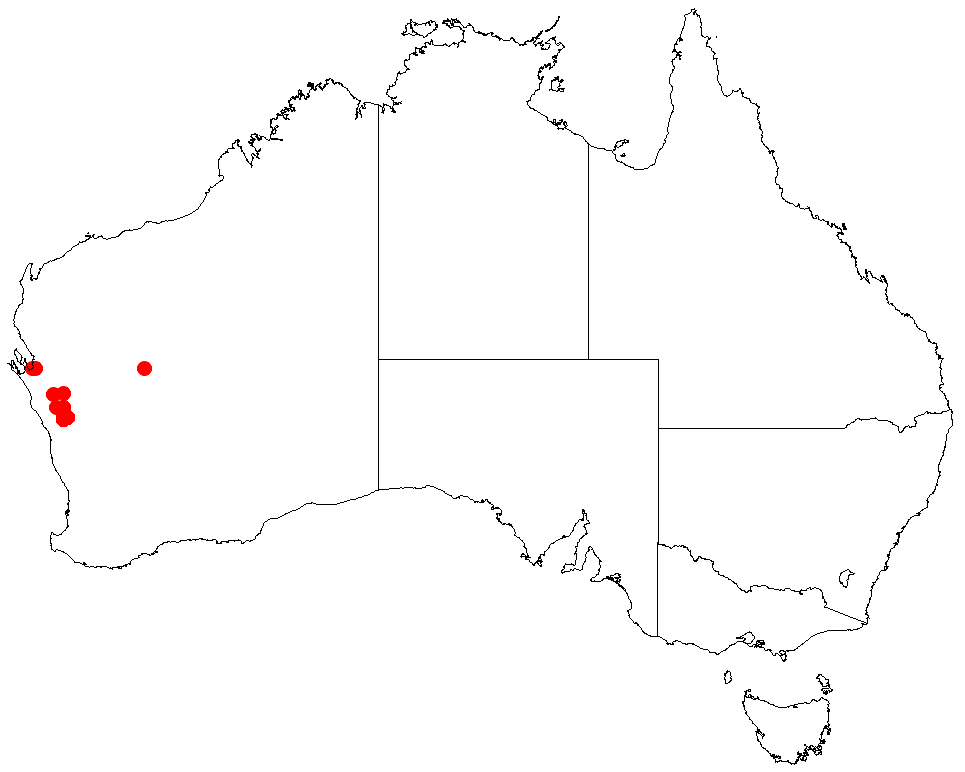
- Occurrence data from AVH

Synonyms
- Racosperma ampliatum (R.S.Cowan & Maslin) Pedley

Species of legume

Acacia ampliata is a species of flowering plant in the family Fabaceae and is endemic to a restricted area in the south-west of Western Australia. It is a shrub or small tree with hairy branchlets, linear phyllodes, golden-coloured flowers arranged in oblong to short-cylindrical heads, and linear pods up to 110 mm (4.3 in) long.

== Description ==
Acacia ampliata is shrub or small tree that typically grows to a height of 2–5 m (6 ft 7 in – 16 ft 5 in) and has finely fissured bark. The phyllodes are ascending to erect, linear, 80–190 mm (3.1–7.5 in) long, 3–6 mm (0.12–0.24 in) wide with a prominent central vein and many closely parallel secondary veins. The flowers are golden-coloured, arranged in 1 or 2 oblong to short-cylindrical heads 6–12 mm (0.24–0.47 in) long, 7–8 mm (0.28–0.31 in) wide, on a peduncle 3.5–9 mm (0.14–0.35 in) long and with many flowers. Flowering occurs from about April to August or from October to December, and the pod is linear, leathery to crust-like, up to 110 mm (4.3 in) long, 5–6 mm (0.20–0.24 in) wide and slightly constricted between the seeds. The seeds are shiny, dark brownish-black, and 4.5–6 mm (0.18–0.24 in) long.

== Taxonomy ==
Acacia ampliata was first formally described in the journal Nuytsia from specimens collected by Maslin, 5 km (3.1 mi) south of Mullewa on the road to Mingenew in 1981. The specific epithet (ampliata) means "enlarged", referring to the wide phyllodes.

== Distribution and habitat ==
This species grows in mallee scrub on loam or sand, mostly near Mullewa with a single collection near Coolcalalaya 100 km (62 mi) north of Mullewa.

== Conservation status ==
Acacia ampliata is listed as "Priority One" by the Government of Western Australia Department of Biodiversity, Conservation and Attractions, meaning that it is known from only one or a few locations where it is potentially at risk.

== See also ==
- List of Acacia species
