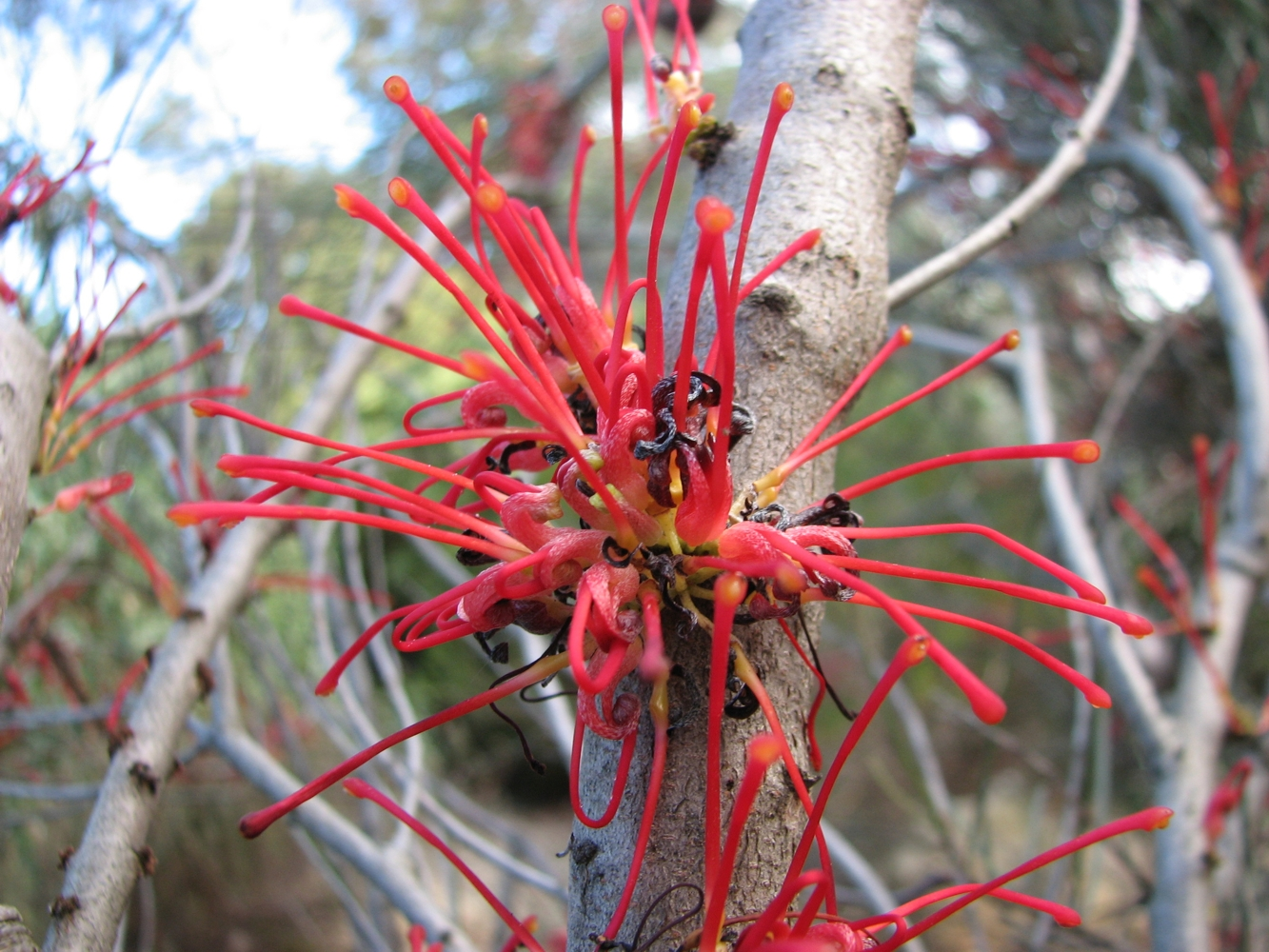
- Hakea orthorrhyncha flower Maranoa Gardens Balwyn, Victoria

Conservation status
- Vulnerable (IUCN 3.1)

Scientific classification
- Kingdom: Plantae
- Clade: Tracheophytes
- Clade: Angiosperms
- Clade: Eudicots
- Order: Proteales
- Family: Proteaceae
- Genus: Hakea
- Species: H. orthorrhyncha

Binomial name
- Hakea orthorrhyncha F.Muell.
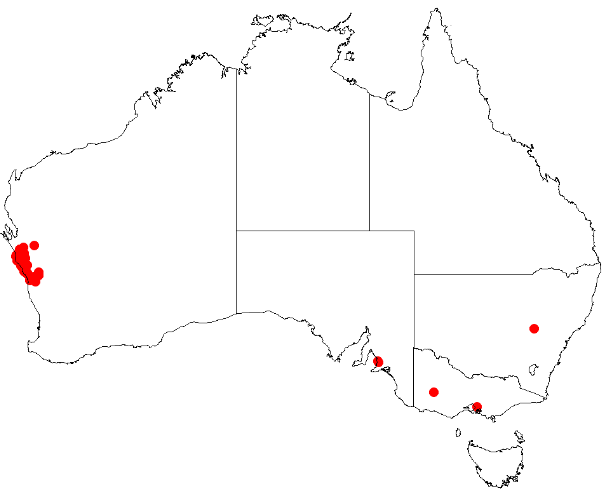
- Occurrence data from AVH

= Hakea orthorrhyncha =

Bird beak hakea

Species of shrub endemic to Western Australia

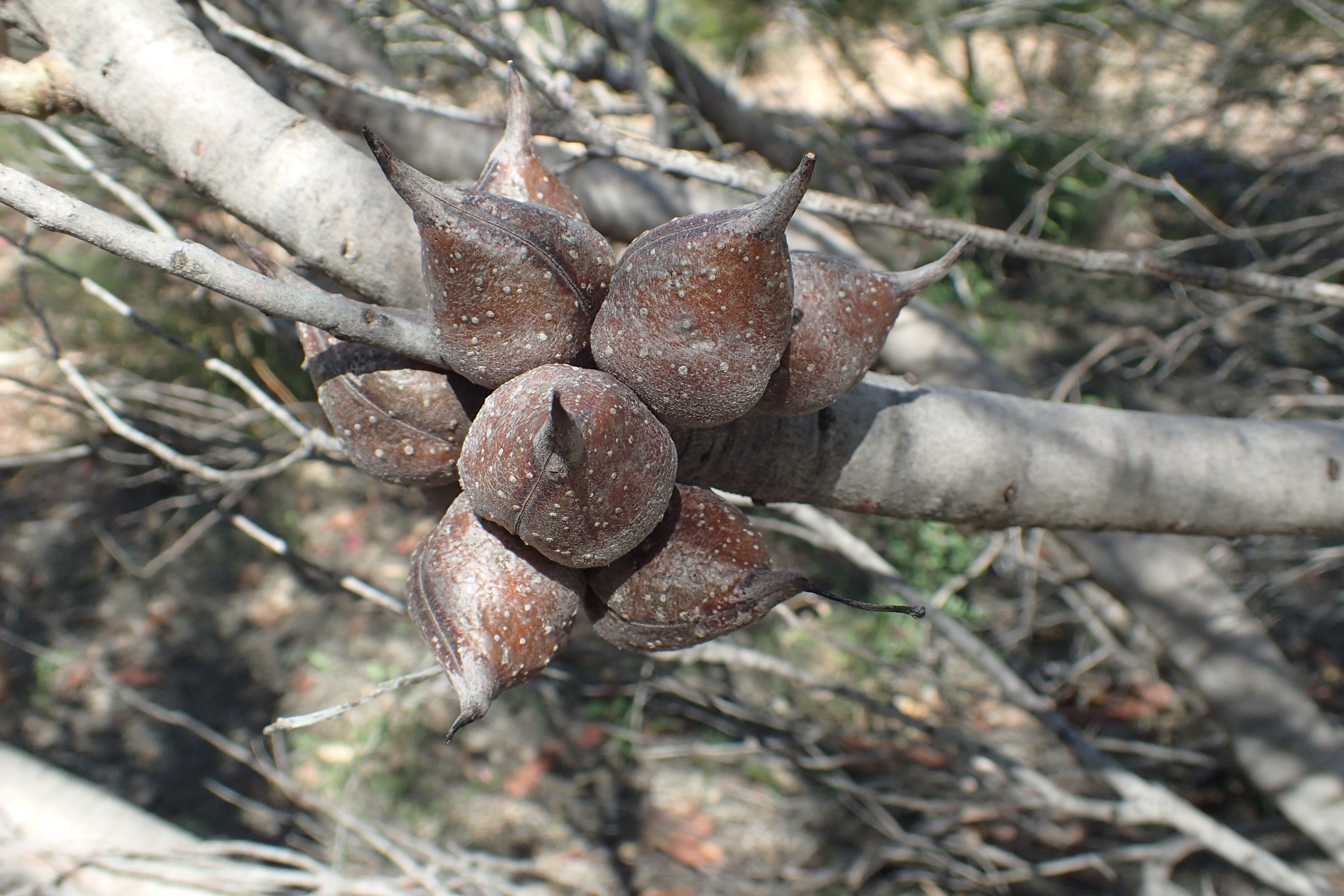
Fruit

Hakea orthorrhyncha, commonly known as bird beak hakea, is a shrub which is endemic to the Murchison River area of Western Australia.

== Description ==
Hakea orthorrhyncha has a spreading habit, growing to between 1–3 m (3–10 ft) tall with a similar spread. The bright red flowers appear in axillary clusters in the leaf nodes on older growth along the branches from early winter to early spring. Leaves vary, they may be needle-like or flat and sometimes forked, curved or straight ending in a sharp point between 7–18 cm (3–7 in) long. Smooth woody fruit are either egg-shaped or elliptic 4–5 cm (2–2 in) long and 2 cm (0.8 in) wide.

== Taxonomy and naming ==
The species was first described in 1868 by Ferdinand von Mueller in his Fragmenta Phytographiae Australiae from specimens collected near the Murchison River by James Drummond and Augustus Oldfield. The specific epithet orthorrhyncha is derived from the Greek orthos 'straight' and rhynchos 'beak' alluding to the straight beak on the seed capsules. The common name, bird beak hakea, is presumed to be a confusion between the Greek words for straight and bird.

There are two varieties of the species, based on differing foliage characteristics:

- Hakea orthorrhyncha var. filiformis F.Muell. ex Benth. has a spreading rounded growth habit to 3 m (10 ft) high, finely textured needle-like dark green leaves often divided up to 160 mm (6 in) long with a groove on the underside of the leaf. This variety grows in the Murchison River to Mingenew area.
- Hakea orthorrhyncha F.Muell. var. orthorrhyncha rounded shrub to 1.5 m (5 ft) has flat long and narrow leathery leaves 2–3 mm (0.08–0.1 in) wide and 140 mm (6 in) long. This variety is confined to the northern sandplains of the Kalbarri region.

== Distribution and habitat ==
Hakea orthorrhyncha grows on the Geraldton sand plains on grey sand, loam and granite.
