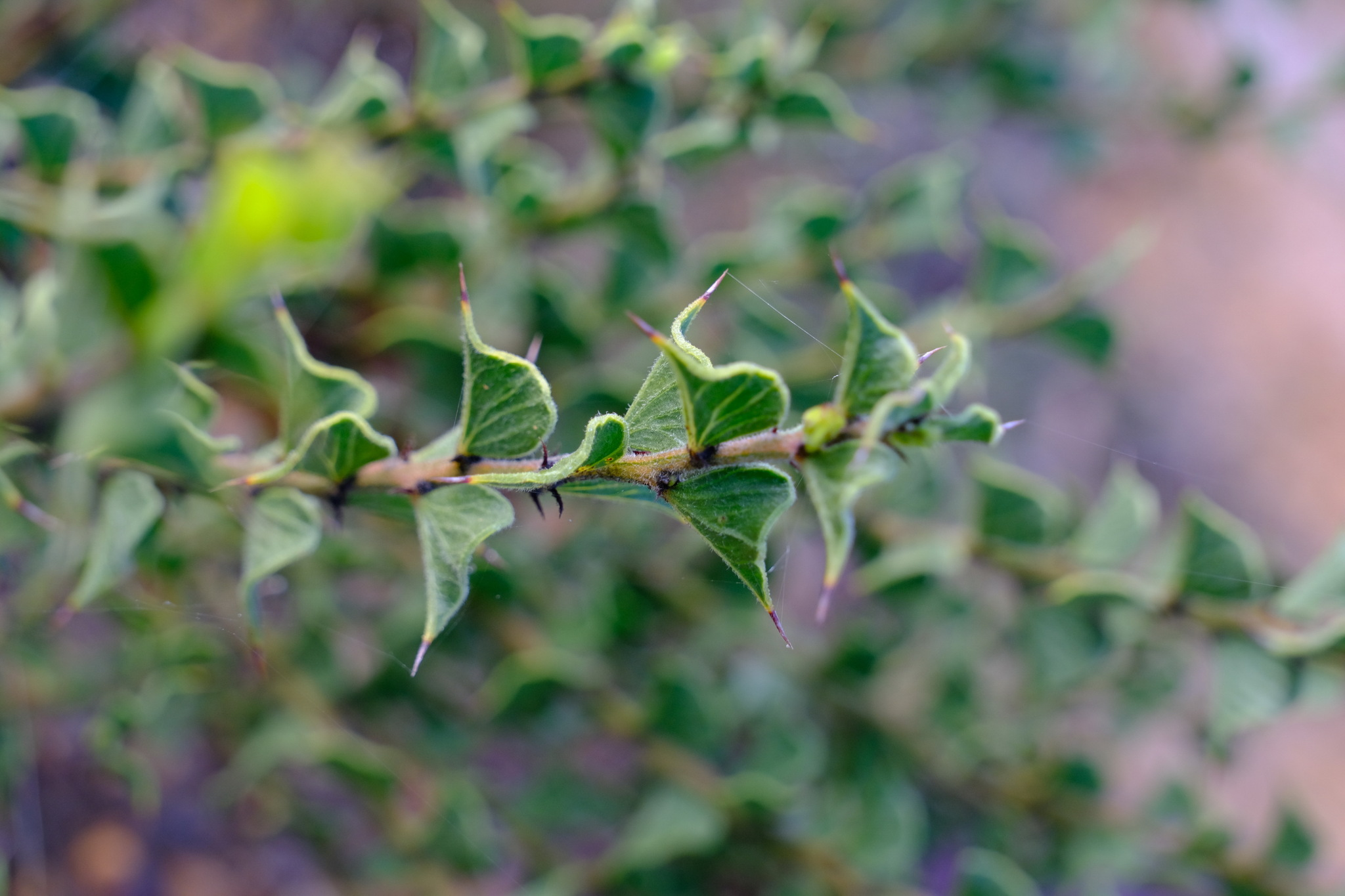

Scientific classification
- Kingdom: Plantae
- Clade: Tracheophytes
- Clade: Angiosperms
- Clade: Eudicots
- Clade: Rosids
- Order: Fabales
- Family: Fabaceae
- Subfamily: Caesalpinioideae
- Clade: Mimosoid clade
- Genus: Acacia
- Subgenus: Acacia subg. Phyllodineae
- Species: A. dilatata

Binomial name
- Acacia dilatata Benth.
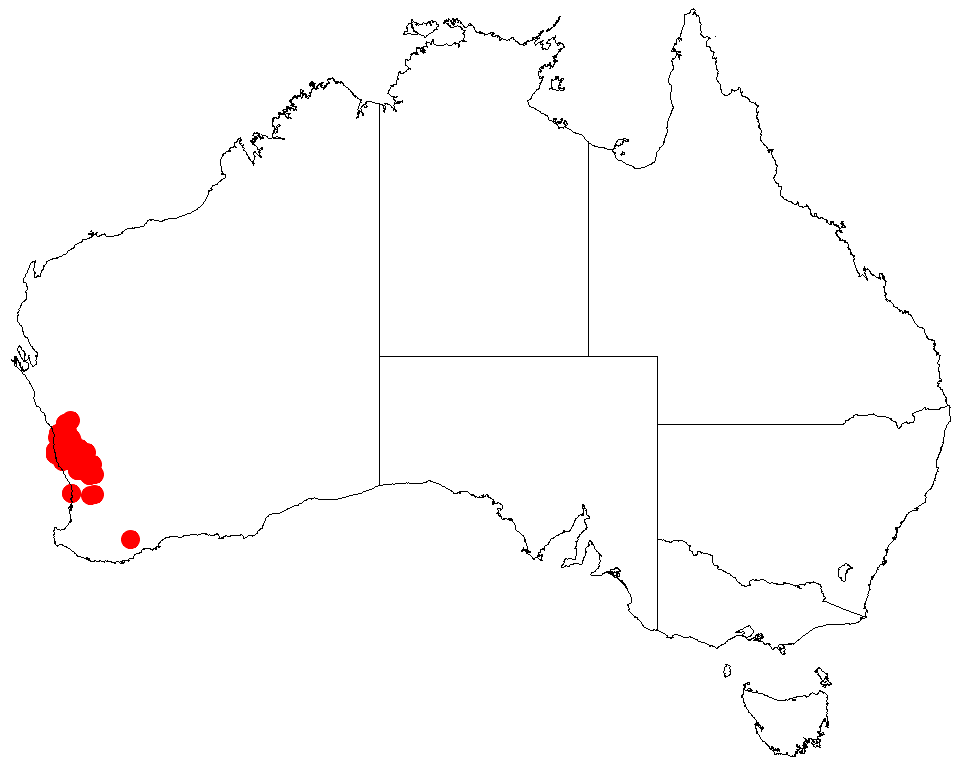
- Occurrence data from AVH

Synonyms
- Racosperma dilatatum (Benth.) Pedley

= Acacia dilatata =

Species of legume

Acacia dilatata is a species of flowering plant in the family Fabaceae and is endemic to the south-west of Western Australia. It is a sprawling or compact, multistemmed shrub with leathery phyllodes with one edge straight and the other edge convex, spherical to oval heads of golden yellow flowers and curved, terete, crusty pods.

== Description ==
Acacia dilatata is a sprawling or compact, multistemmed shrub that typically grows to a height of 30–70 cm (12–28 in) and has branchlets that are usually covered with soft hairs. The phyllodes are leathery, dark green or yellow-green, usually 10–20 mm (0.39–0.79 in) long, 7–10 mm (0.28–0.39 in) wide and sharply pointed. One edge of the phyllodes is often conspicuously rounded and more or less parallel to the branchlet and the other edge straight. The midrib is very close to the straight edge, and there are rigid, often spiny stipules at the base of the phyllodes. The flowers are borne in a spherical to oblong head in axils on a peduncle 5–10 mm (0.20–0.39 in) long, each heads with 15 to 25 golden yellow flowers. Flowering occurs during summer, and the pods are curved, terete, up to about 55 mm (2.2 in) long, 4.0–5.5 mm (0.16–0.22 in) wide, dark reddish brown, crusty and usually covered with fine, soft hairs. The seeds are oblong, 4.8–5.5 mm (0.19–0.22 in) long and brown with a conical aril on the end.

== Taxonomy ==
Acacia dilatata was first formally described in 1855 by George Bentham in the journal Linnaea from specimens collected by James Drummond. The specific epithet (dilatata) means 'widened', referring to the phyllodes that widen upwards.

== Distribution ==
This species of wattle found on found on sandplains, clay flats and rocky lateritic ridges growing in sandy or clay soils in scattered populations from Mingenew south to Mogumber, 30 km (19 mi) west of Wongan Hills and near Darkin Swamp about 35 km (22 mi) south-west of York, in heath or low shrubland, in the Avon Wheatbelt, Geraldton Sandplains, Jarrah Forest, Mallee and Swan Coastal Plain bioregions of south-western Western Australia.

== Conservation status ==
Acacia dilatata is listed as "not threatened" by the Government of Western Australia Department of Biodiversity, Conservation and Attractions.

== See also ==
- List of Acacia species
