= Nangetty, Western Australia =

Nangetty
- Town
- Coordinates: 28°59′10″S 115°25′56″E
- Country: Australia
- State: Western Australia
- LGA(s): Shire of Mingenew

Government
  - State electorate(s): Moore
  - Federal division(s): Durack

Area
  - Total: 400.6 km^{2} (154.7 sq mi)

Population
  - Total(s): 20 (SAL 2021)
- Postcode: 6522

Nangetty is a small town in the Mid West region of Western Australia.
