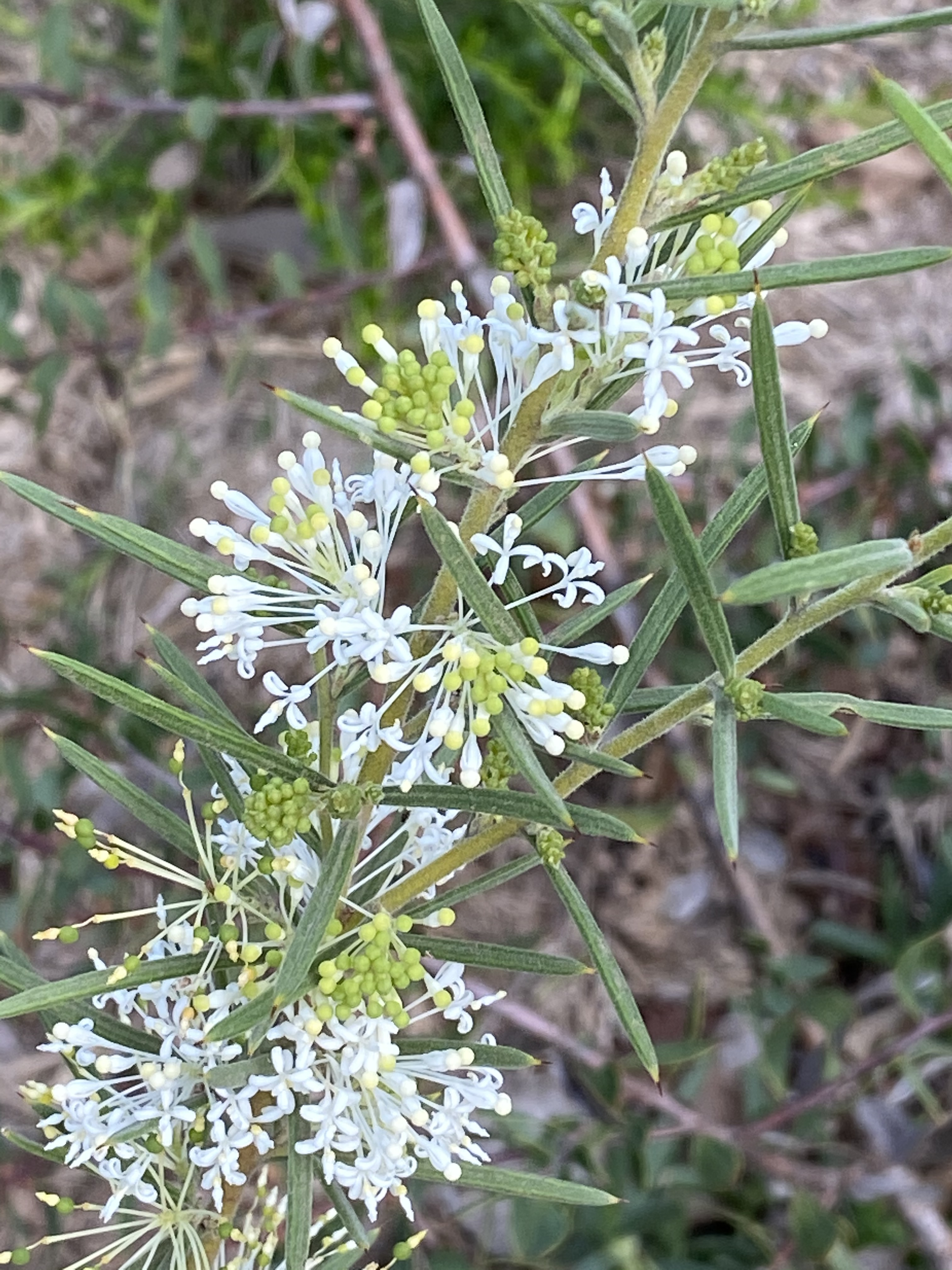

Conservation status
- Least Concern (IUCN 3.1)

Scientific classification
- Kingdom: Plantae
- Clade: Embryophytes
- Clade: Tracheophytes
- Clade: Spermatophytes
- Clade: Angiosperms
- Clade: Eudicots
- Order: Proteales
- Family: Proteaceae
- Genus: Grevillea
- Species: G. biternata

Binomial name
- Grevillea biternata Meisn.

Synonyms
- Grevillea biternata Meisn. var. biternata; Grevillea biternata var. leptostachya Benth.

= Grevillea biternata =

Species of shrub endemic to Western Australia

Grevillea biternata is a species of flowering plant in the family Proteaceae and is endemic to the south-west of Western Australia. It is a shrub with divided leaves with linear lobes and clusters of white flowers.

== Description ==
Grevillea biternata is a shrub that typically grows to a height of 1–2.5 m (3 ft 3 in – 8 ft 2 in) and usually has branchlets densely covered with soft, woolly hairs. The leaves are usually divided with two to three linear lobes, the lobes 15–40 mm (0.59–1.57 in) long, 1.0–2.8 mm (0.039–0.110 in) wide and sharply pointed. The flowers are arranged in cone-shaped or cylindrical groups of eight to thirty on a rachis 7–20 mm (0.28–0.79 in) long, and are pale pale green in the bud stage, later white. The pistil is 3–4 mm (0.12–0.16 in) long. Flowering occurs from July to November and the fruit is an oblong follicle 7–10 mm (0.28–0.39 in) long.

== Taxonomy ==
Grevillea biternata was first formally described in 1845 by Carl Meissner in Johann Georg Christian Lehmann's Plantae Preissianae from specimens collected by James Drummond in the Swan River Colony. The specific epithet (biternata) means "twice-ternate", referring to the three leaflets of each leaf.

== Distribution and habitat ==
This grevillea grows in heath or mallee-woodland between New Norcia, Northampton, Wubin and Wongan Hills in the Avon Wheatbelt, Geraldton Sandplains, Jarrah Forest and Swan Coastal Plain bioregions of south-western Western Australia.

== Conservation status ==
Grevillea biternata is listed as not threatened by the Department of Biodiversity, Conservation and Attractions and as least concern on the IUCN Red List of Threatened Species. It has no major threats, either current or in the near future. Although the population is suspected to be decreasing, it is not declining significantly enough to warrant a threatened or near-threatened category.
