= Irwin River =

River in Western Australia

Coordinates: 29°15′35″S 114°55′7″E

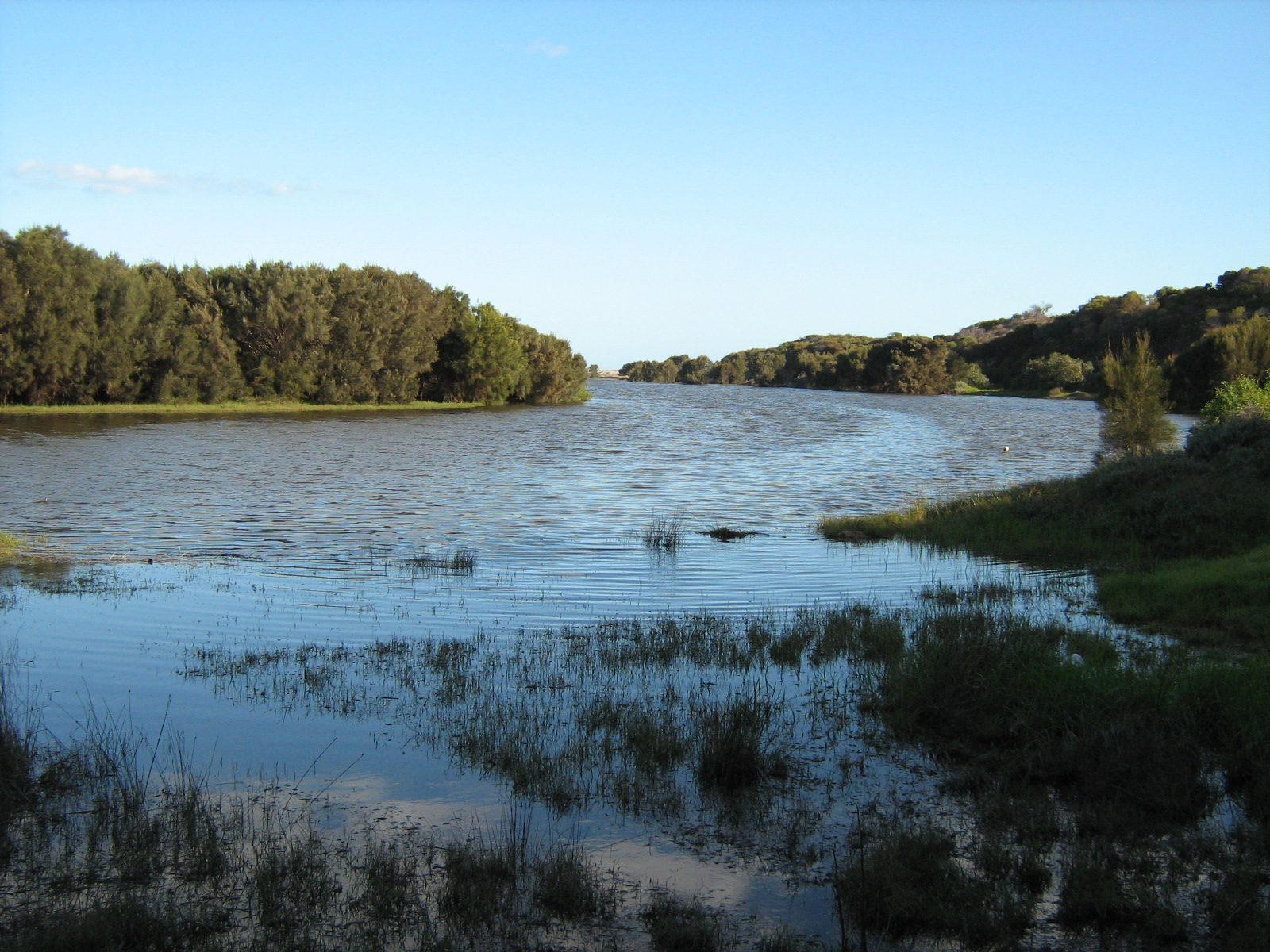
- Irwin River wetlands near Dongara, Western Australia

Location
- Country: Australia

Physical characteristics
- Source
  - location: Near Pindar
  - elevation: 326 metres (1,070 ft)
- Mouth
  - location: Arurine Bay, between Port Denison and Dongara
  - elevation: Sea level
- Length: 140 km (87 mi)
- Basin size: 6,071 km^{2} (2,344 sq mi)

The Irwin River is a river in the Mid West region of Western Australia. It was named on 9 April 1839 by the explorer George Grey, while on his second disastrous exploration expedition along the Western Australian coast. Grey named the river after his friend Major Frederick Irwin, the Commandant of the Swan River settlement.

The headwaters of the Irwin are located below Canna near Pindar. The river flows west until discharging into Arurine Bay near Dongara.

The river passes through the Coalseam Conservation Park to the north of Mingenew which has a mixed geology of siltstones, claystones and sandstones that form stripes in the cliff faces formed by the river.

The river has four tributaries: Lockier River, Sand Plain Creek, Nangetty Creek and Mullewa Creek.

The river occasionally floods as it did in 1945 following a severe storm that swept over the area. The river broke its banks and caused extensive damage including the loss of 450 sheep that were swept away from a farm that straddled the river.
