= Acacia scalena =

Conservation status
- Priority Three — Poorly Known Taxa (DEC)

Scientific classification
- Kingdom: Plantae
- Clade: Tracheophytes
- Clade: Angiosperms
- Clade: Eudicots
- Clade: Rosids
- Order: Fabales
- Family: Fabaceae
- Subfamily: Caesalpinioideae
- Clade: Mimosoid clade
- Genus: Acacia
- Species: A. scalena

Binomial name
- Acacia scalena Maslin
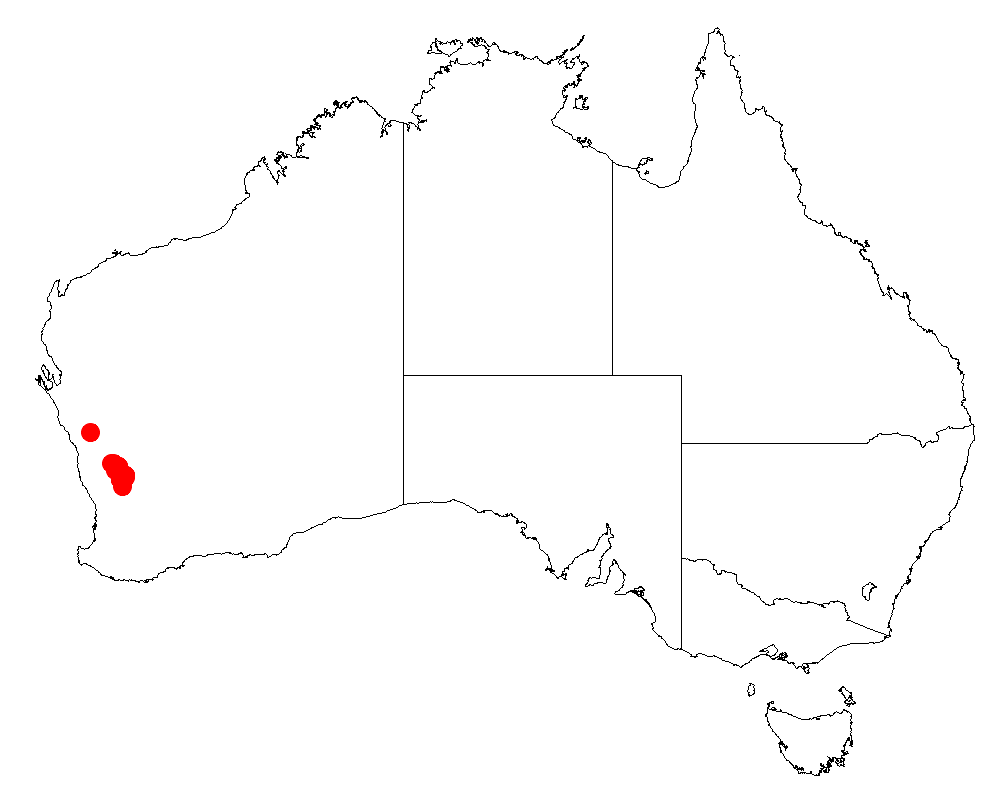
- Occurrence data from AVH

Species of legume

Acacia scalena is a shrub of the genus Acacia and the subgenus Phyllodineae that is endemic to a small area in western Australia.

== Description ==
The rigid prickly shrub typically grows to a height of 0.5 to 1.5 metres (2 to 5 ft). The glabrous, short, rigid and straight branchlets are patent to ascending are often spinose and lightly covered in a fine white powdery coating. Like many species it has phyllodes rather than new leaves. The grey-green to blue-green, pungent, sessile and dimidiate phyllodes have a length of 5 to 10 mm (0.20 to 0.39 in) and a width of 3 to 10 mm (0.12 to 0.39 in)with a midrib near lower margin. It blooms from June to September and produces yellow flowers. The rudimentary inflorescences occur singly on racemes with a length of around 0.4 mm (0.016 in) the spherical flower-heads contain 18 to 22 golden coloured flowers. The undulate seed pods that form after flowering have a narrowly oblong shape with a length of up to 4 cm (1.6 in) and a width of 4 to 6 mm (0.16 to 0.24 in). The mottled seeds inside have an elliptic shape with a length of about 0.3 mm (0.012 in) and a waxy dull yellow aril.

== Distribution ==
It is native to an area in the Wheatbelt and Mid West regions of Western Australia where it is found growing in yellow coloured sandy or loamy soils. The range of the plant extends from around Ballidu in the south to around Latham in the north where it is usually found as a part of Eucalyptus woodland or open heath communities.

== See also ==
- List of Acacia species
