= Yandanooka, Western Australia =

Yandanooka
- Town
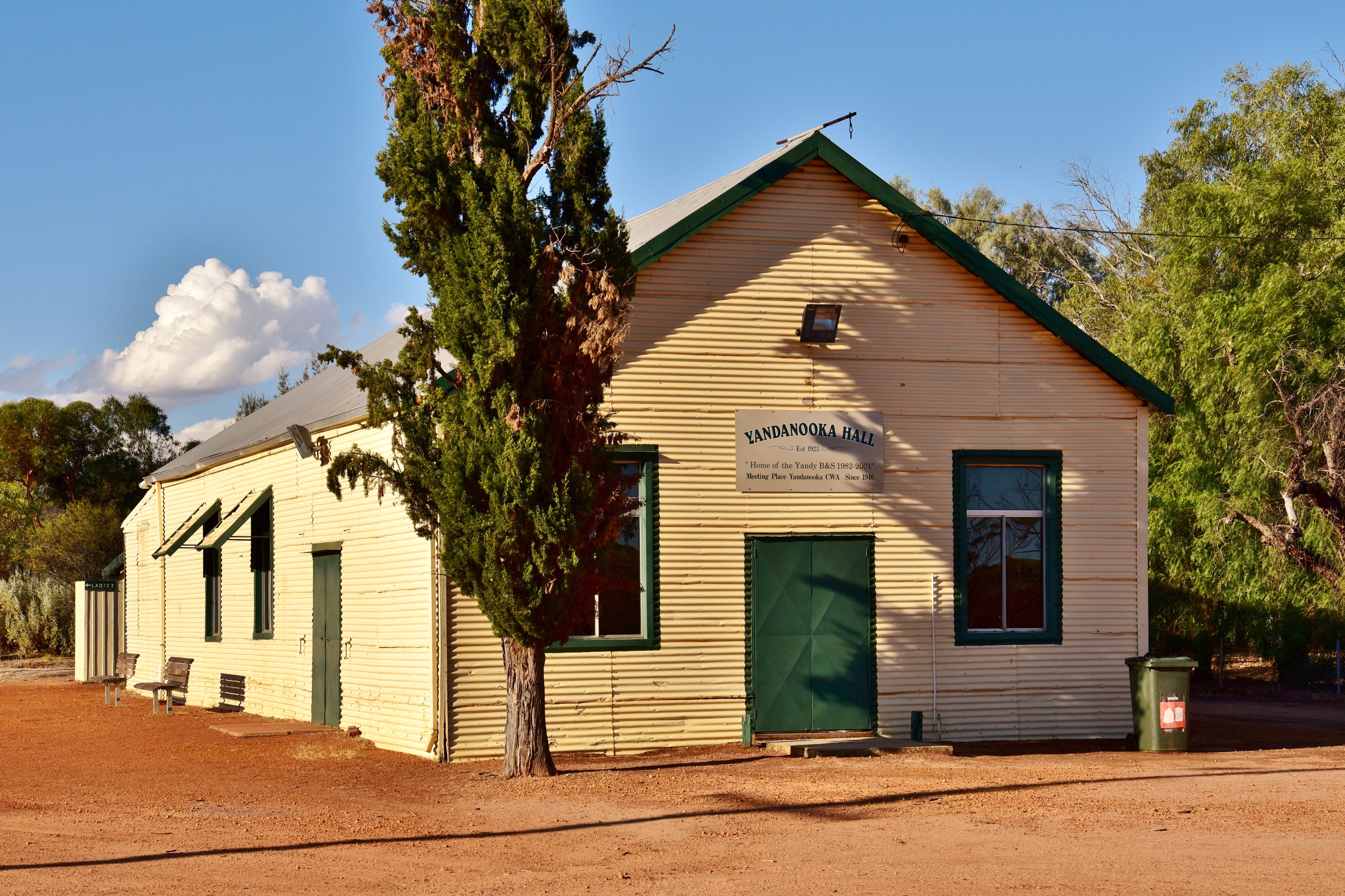
- Yandanooka Hall, 2018

- Coordinates: 29°19′S 115°34′E
- Country: Australia
- State: Western Australia
- LGA: Shire of Mingenew
- Location: 348 km (216 mi) N of Perth; 20 km (12 mi) SE of Mingenew
- Established: 1919

Government
  - State electorate: Moore
  - Federal division: Durack

Area
  - Total: 238.3 km^{2} (92.0 sq mi)
- Elevation: 231 m (758 ft)

Population
  - Total: 30 (SAL 2021)
- Postcode: 6522

Yandanooka is a small town in the Mid West region of Western Australia. The town is located between Mingenew and Three Springs on the Midlands Road.

The name of the town is Aboriginal in origin, taken from the name of the local water source, and is thought to mean "plenty of hilly country in sight". The townsite was gazetted in 1919.

The first settler in the area was Thomas Whitfield in the 1850s, and a railway siding was created there on the Midland Railway when it opened in 1895. In 1902, the siding was moved 4 kilometres (2.5 mi) to the south and land around the siding was set aside for a townsite. Lots were surveyed in 1913 and gazetted six years later.

In 1927 the town was suffering from a lack of accommodation and the locals presented a petition to the licensing board in Mingenew to open a hotel in town. Railway traffic had increased dramatically; in 1922 only 13,000 bags of wheat were sent by rail, but this had increased to 80,000 by 1925 and was expected to be over 100,000 in 1927.

In 1978 the primary school closed, with children having to travel by bus to Mingenew and teenagers to the high school in Morawa. The transportable room was relocated to Eneabba, and the original school building was demolished in the 2000s. The principal's house was transferred into private ownership in 1979 and is only remaining school site structure still standing.

In 1979 the general store also closed, the nearest shops now being 20 kilometres (12 mi) away in Mingenew.

In the 1980s the siding closed to grain receivals and the facilities removed, after which farmers had trucked grains into Mingenew.

By 2010 all that remained of the town site were the former general store, now a private residence, the town hall with adjoining CWA children's park, a small shed used by locals for mail receipt, and the principal's house.
