= Shire of Mingenew =

Coordinates: 29°11′38″S 115°26′28″E

- Local government area
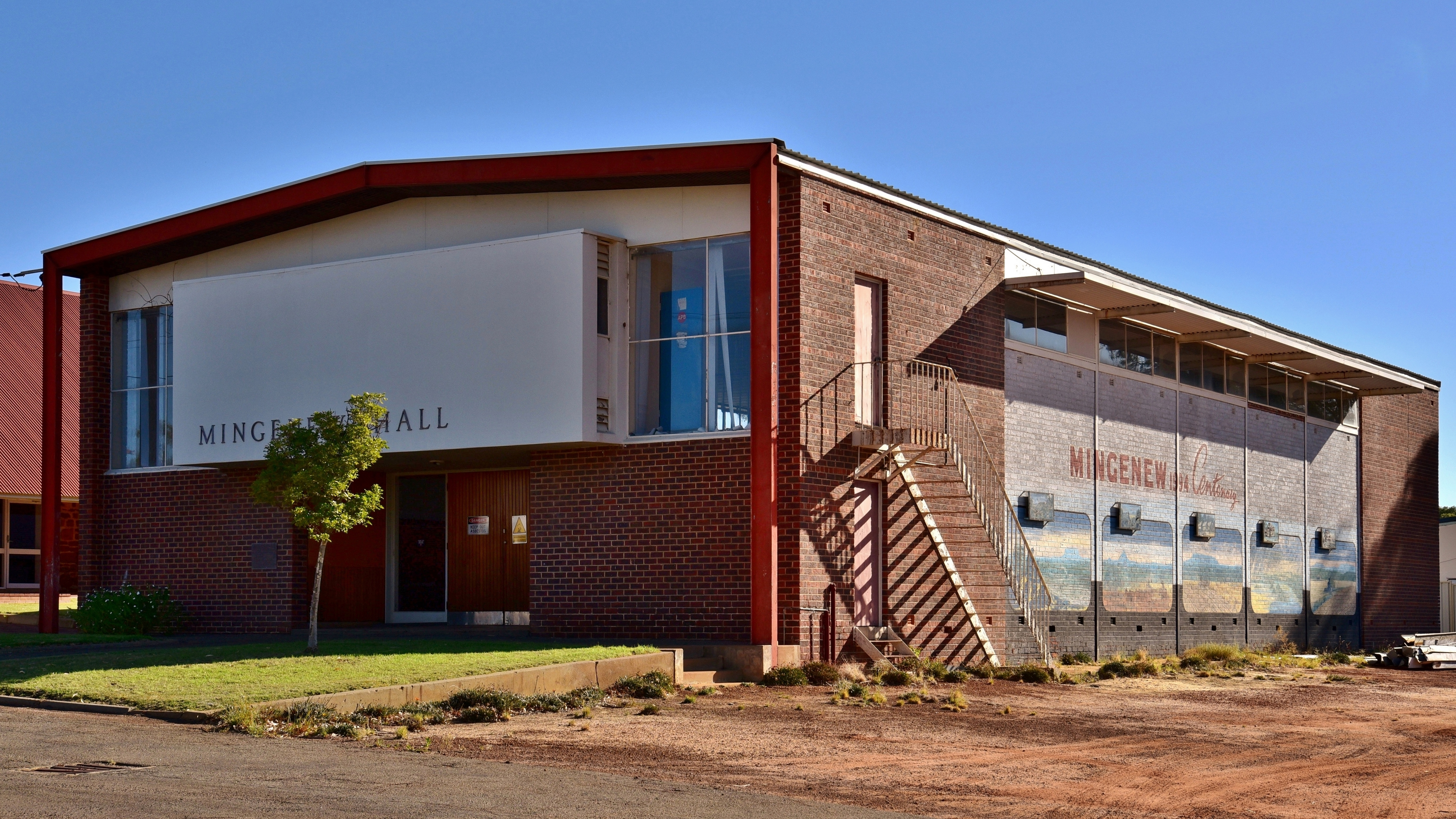
- Mingenew Town Hall, 2018

- Interactive map of Shire of Mingenew
- Country: Australia
- State: Western Australia
- Region: Mid West
- Council seat: Mingenew

Government
  - Shire President: Gary Cosgrove
  - State electorate: Moore
  - Federal division: Durack

Area
  - Total: 1,939.4 km^{2} (748.8 sq mi)

Population
  - Total: 407 (LGA 2021)
- Website: Shire of Mingenew
LGAs around Shire of Mingenew
Greater Geraldton	Greater Geraldton	Morawa
Irwin	Shire of Mingenew	Morawa
Irwin	Three Springs	Perenjori

The Shire of Mingenew is a local government area in the Mid West region of Western Australia, about 110 kilometres (68 mi) southeast of the city of Geraldton and about 370 kilometres (230 mi) north of the state capital, Perth. The Shire covers an area of 1,939 square kilometres (749 sq mi), and its seat of government is the town of Mingenew.

== History ==
The Shire of Mingenew was initially constituted as the Upper Irwin Road District on 25 October 1901, over a much larger area. On 12 December 1919, it was renamed the Mingenew Road District. Between 1923 and 1928, it lost 80% of its land area to the neighbouring Perenjori-Morawa Road District and the new districts of Carnamah and Three Springs. By 1930, it had adopted roughly its present boundaries.

On 1 July 1961, it became a shire following the passage of the Local Government Act 1960, which reformed all remaining road districts into shires.

On 18 September 2009, the Shires of Mingenew, Three Springs, Morawa and Perenjori announced their intention to amalgamate. A formal agreement was signed five days later, and the name Billeranga was later chosen. However, by February 2011, community pressure had led to the negotiations stalling, and on 16 April 2011, voters from the Shire of Perenjori defeated the proposal at a referendum.

== Wards ==
Since 2005 the Shire has been divided into two wards. Prior to this, a five-ward system was in place with the Town Ward having three councillors and the remaining wards one each.

- Rural Ward (three councillors)
- Town Ward (four councillors)

== Towns and localities ==
The towns and localities of the Shire of Mingenew with population and size figures based on the most recent Australian census:

Locality	Population	Area	Map
Bundanoon	19 (SAL 2021)	129.1 km^{2} (49.8 sq mi)	
Holmwood	9 (SAL 2021)	237.3 km^{2} (91.6 sq mi)	
Ikewa	12 (SAL 2021)	147.9 km^{2} (57.1 sq mi)	
Lockier	3 (SAL 2021)	82.2 km^{2} (31.7 sq mi)	
Mingenew	258 (SAL 2021)	5.8 km^{2} (2.2 sq mi)	
Mooriary	18 (SAL 2021)	301.8 km^{2} (116.5 sq mi)	
Mount Budd	9 (SAL 2021)	152.9 km^{2} (59.0 sq mi)	
Nangetty	20 (SAL 2021)	400.6 km^{2} (154.7 sq mi)	
Yandanooka	30 (SAL 2021)	238.3 km^{2} (92.0 sq mi)	
Yarragadee	29 (SAL 2021)	238.5 km^{2} (92.1 sq mi)	

== Population ==
Historical population

Year	Pop.	±% p.a.
1933	811	—
1947	690	−1.15%
1954	960	+4.83%
1961	985	+0.37%
1966	978	−0.14%
1971	987	+0.18%
1976	841	−3.15%
1981	736	−2.63%

Year	Pop.	±% p.a.
1986	693	−1.20%
1991	621	−2.17%
1996	586	−1.15%
2001	542	−1.55%
2006	471	−2.77%
2011	480	+0.38%
2016	455	−1.06%
2021	407	−2.21%

== Heritage-listed places ==
As of 2023, 62 places are heritage-listed in the Shire of Mingenew, of which three are on the State Register of Heritage Places.
