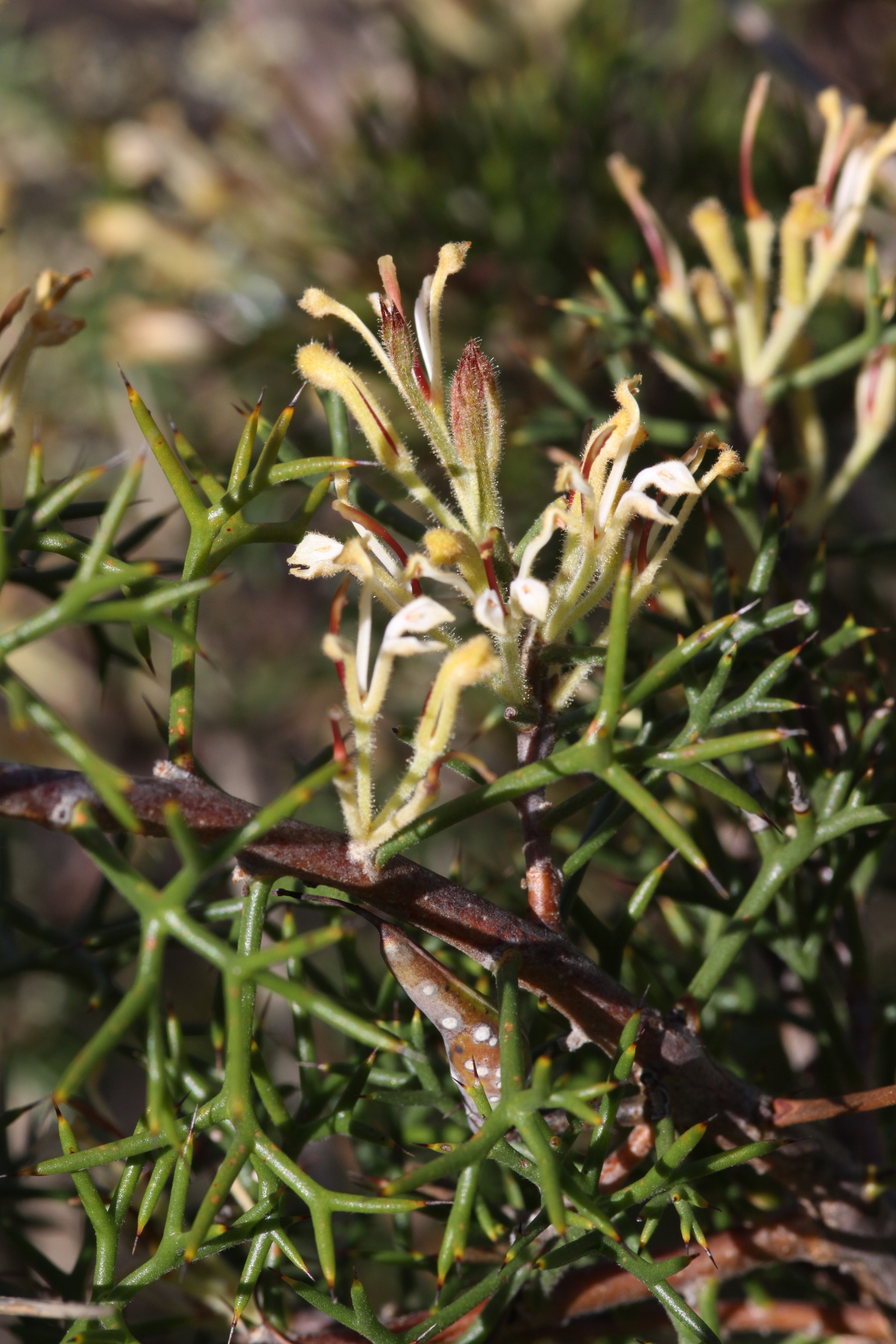
- In John Forrest National Park, Western Australia

Conservation status
- Least Concern (IUCN 3.1)

Scientific classification
- Kingdom: Plantae
- Clade: Tracheophytes
- Clade: Angiosperms
- Clade: Eudicots
- Order: Proteales
- Family: Proteaceae
- Genus: Hakea
- Species: H. erinacea

Binomial name
- Hakea erinacea Meisn.
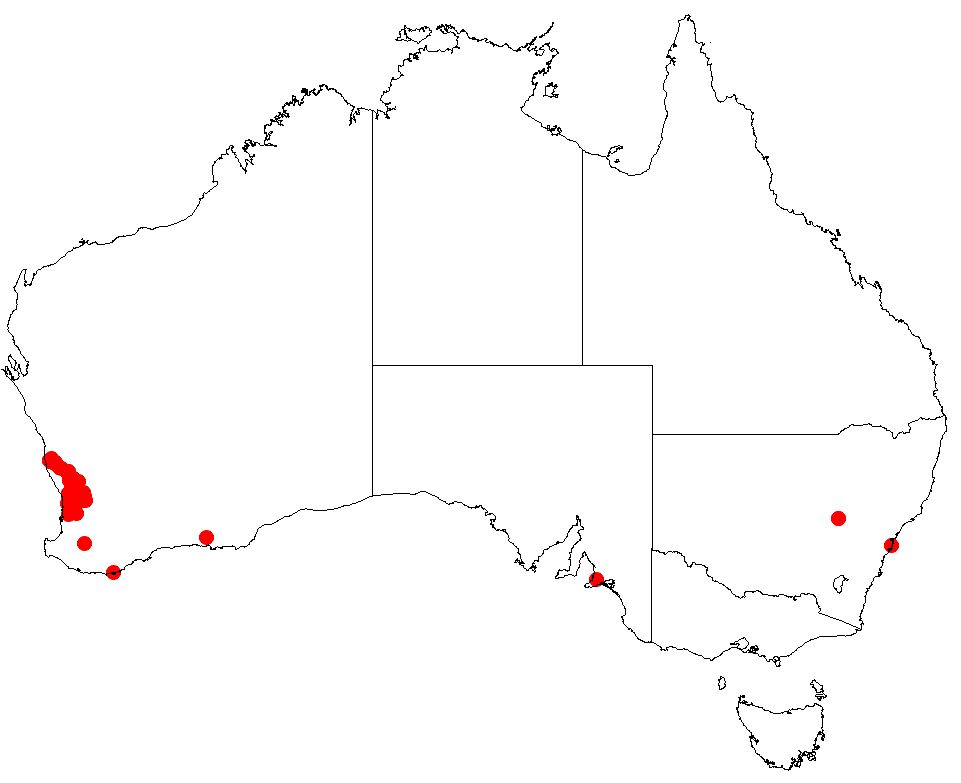
- Occurrence data from AVH

= Hakea erinacea =

Hedgehog hakea

Species of shrub endemic to Western Australia

Hakea erinacea, commonly known as hedge-hog hakea is a shrub in the family Proteaceae endemic to south-west Western Australia.

== Description ==
Hakea erinacea is erect in habit, with spiny short terete leaves, and grows to over 1.5 metres (4 ft 11 in) in height and about the same width. The flowers are cream to white in colour with red to purple pistils and are produced between May and November. The small smooth fruit are narrow, curved and end in a short pointed beak. Many Hakea retain their fruit, however this species sheds its seed when ripe.

== Taxonomy and naming ==
Hakea erinacea was first described in 1845 by Carl Meisner and the description was published in Proteaceae. Plantae Preissianae. It derives its name from the Latin erinaceus 'hedgehog', referring to its very spiky leaves.

== Distribution and habitat ==
Hakea erinacea grows on sandy loam, clay and lateritic gravel on the coastal plains and the Darling Ranges north of Perth.

== Conservation status ==
H. erinacea is presently listed by Western Australian government as "not threatened".
