= Mingenew, Western Australia =

Mingenew
- Town
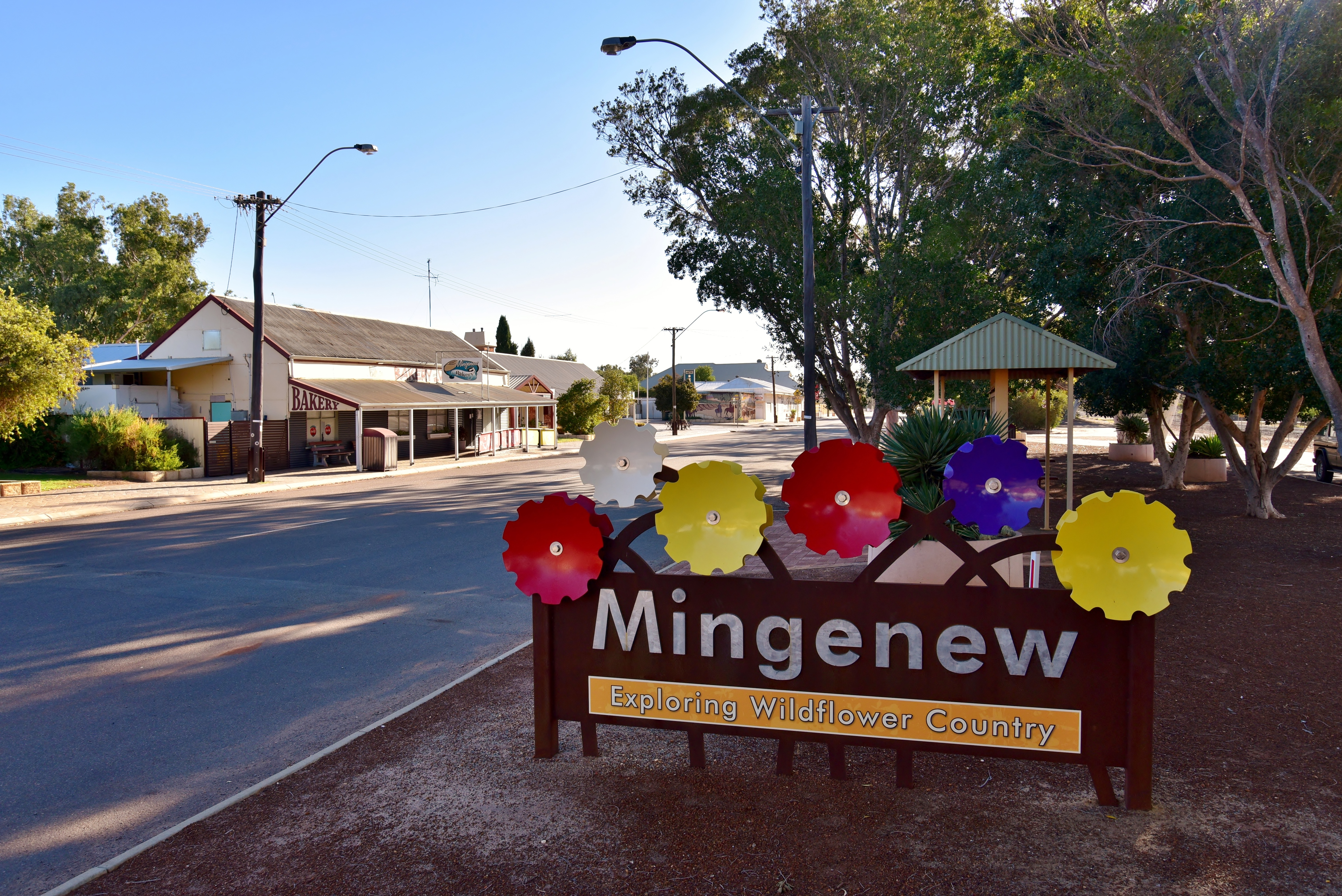
- Mingenew's main street

- Interactive map of Mingenew
- Coordinates: 29°11′38″S 115°26′28″E
- Country: Australia
- State: Western Australia
- LGA: Shire of Mingenew
- Location: 383 km (238 mi) north of Perth; 119 km (74 mi) east of Geraldton
- Established: 1906

Government
  - State electorate: Moore
  - Federal division: Durack

Area
  - Total: 5.8 km^{2} (2.2 sq mi)
- Elevation: 156 m (512 ft)

Population
  - Total: 249 (UCL 2021)
- Postcode: 6522

Mingenew is a town in Western Australia, located 383 kilometres (238 mi) north of the state capital, Perth. It is the seat of government for the Shire of Mingenew.

== History ==
Mingenew was named after Mingenew Spring, an Aboriginal word recorded by European settlers in 1856, possibly deriving from either the words Minga nu "the place of many ants and flies" or Mininoo "the place of many waters". Mingenew and the surrounding Irwin District were first explored by the brothers Augustus Charles and Francis Thomas Gregory in August 1847, looking for suitable grazing land. Settlement of the district then occurred in the 1850s because it was ideal country for cattle. The Midland railway line opened in August 1891, and private land was subdivided, followed in 1906 by subdivision of government land. In 1906, the town of Mingenew was gazetted.

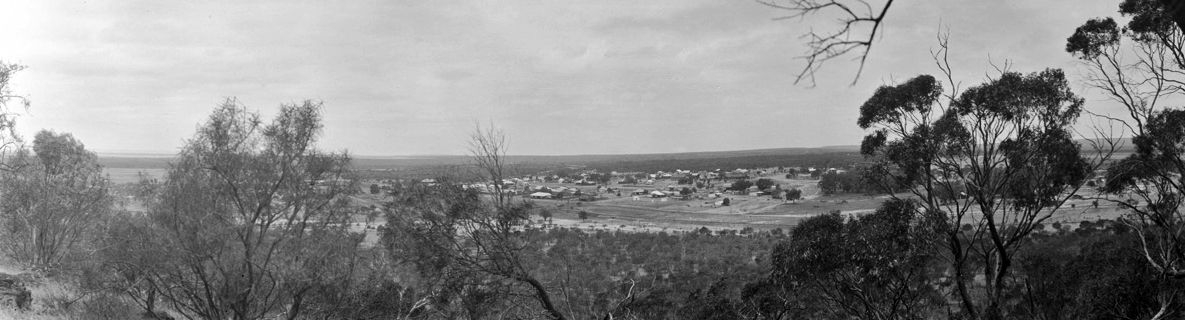
1920s panorama of Mingenew, taken from Mingenew Hill, overlooking the town

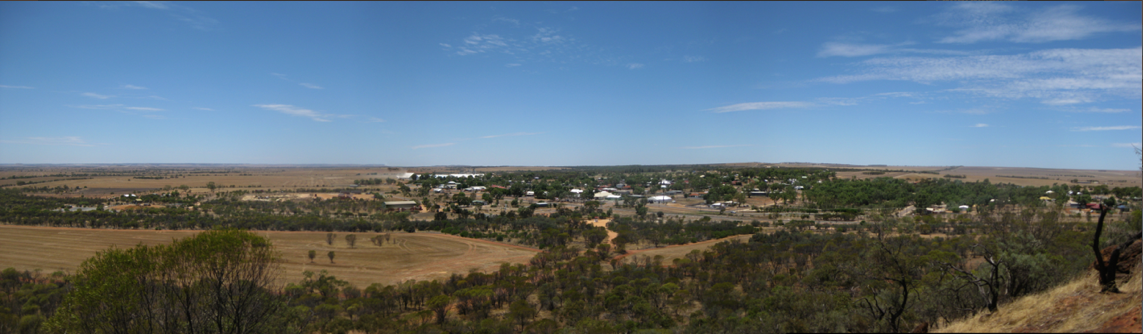
2010 panorama of Mingenew, also taken from Mingenew Hill

== Agriculture ==
The town's economy is based on the farming of sheep, wheat and lupins.

Mingenew is known as The Grain Centre. The CBH Group grain facility is the largest inland grower fed receival site facility in the Southern Hemisphere, with a holding capacity of 403,000 tons.

== Attractions ==
=== Wildflowers ===
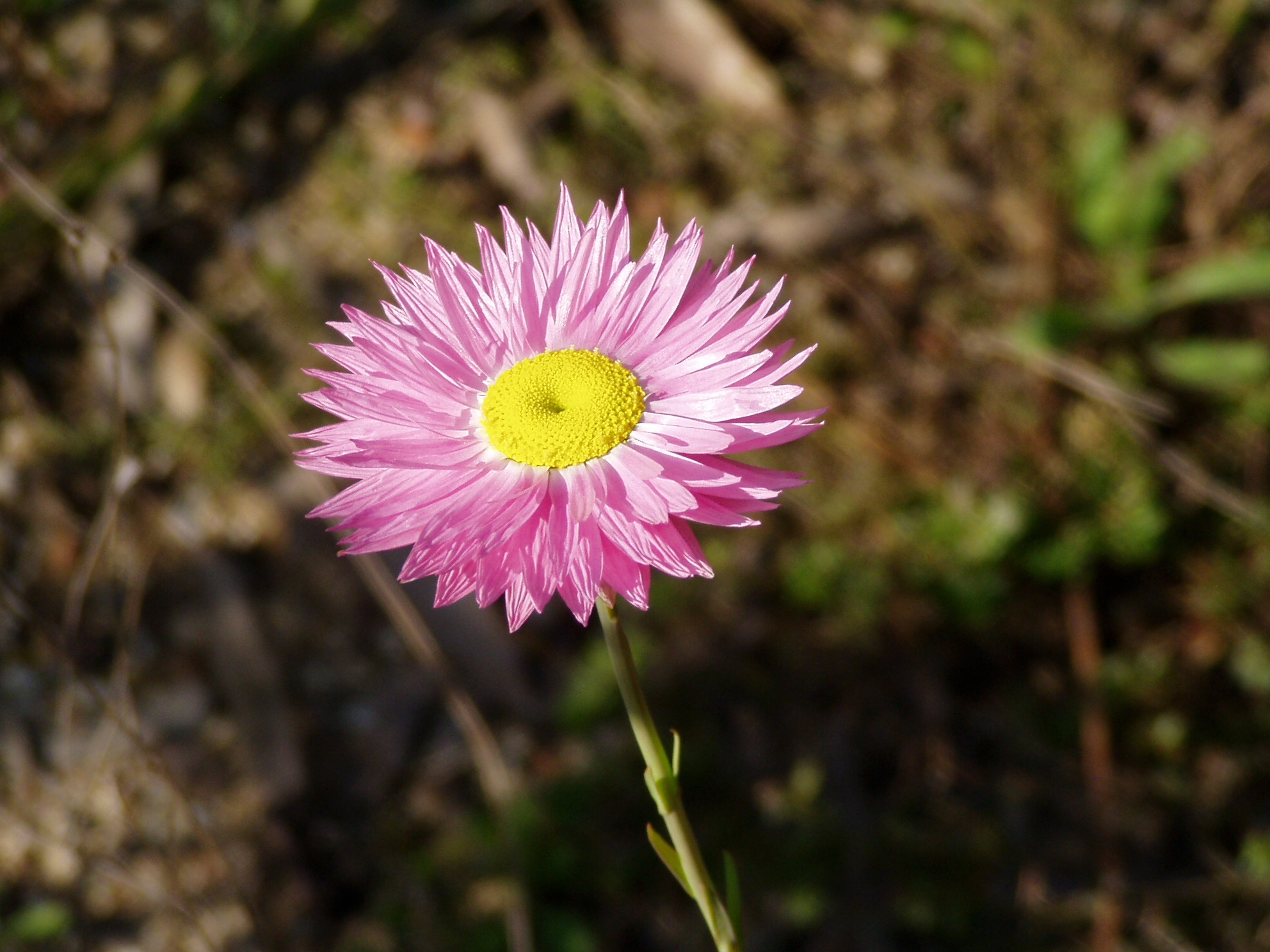
A pink everlasting or Rhodanthe chlorocephala rosea

Mingenew has many spectacular displays of wildflowers between late July and early October. Varieties include everlastings, hakeas, banksias and grevilleas. Mingenew's floral emblem is the bird beak hakea (Hakea orthorrhyncha).

==== Coalseam Conservation Park ====
Located 33 km north east of Mingenew, the Coalseam Conservation Park is a renowned site for its carpets of native pink and white everlastings (Rhodanthe chlorocephala ss. rosea) and yellow pom pom (Cephalipterum drummondii) wildflowers. The area was named the Coalseam after the Gregory brothers discovered coal exposed within the sedimentary layers of the banks of the Irwin River in 1846. This marked the first discovery of coal in Western Australia, however, after a number of shafts were dug, only narrow seams of poor quality coal were found, so the site was abandoned. The park is now a popular picnic place, where remnants of its mining history are still present. Also present are many marine fossils embedded in the riverbank and the magnificent limestone cliffs from the Permian Ice Age, 250 million years ago – the oldest geological era.
