= List of Western Australian railway-related acts =

Railways in Western Australia were developed in the 19th century both by the Government of Western Australia and a number of private companies. Legislation concerning railways was passed by:

- the Governor of Western Australia and the Western Australian Legislative Council, until 1890
- the Parliament of Western Australia, from 1890, when WA achieved responsible government

The oldest recorded act of parliament in Western Australia is the Civil Court of Western Australia (1832) act, an act for establishing a Court of Civil Judicature, assented to on 10 February 1832, under the first Governor of Western Australia, James Stirling. The first act to carry the word railway in its title was the Railways and Electric Telegraph Protection Act 1871, assented to on 12 January 1871, while the Geraldton and Northampton Railway Act 1873 was the first act to authorise the construction of a railway in Western Australia in 1873.

The Railway (Coogee–Kwinana Railway) Discontinuance Act 1973, assented to on 6 June 1973, was the last railway-related act to use imperial units, the Railway (Kalgoorlie–Parkeston) Discontinuance and Land Revestment Act 1973, assented to on 6 November 1973, the first to use the metric system, as part of the overall change to the metric system in Australia.

== List of acts ==
=== Acts 1871 to 1890 ===
The acts by the Governor of Western Australia and the Western Australian Legislative Council:

Title	Date of assent	Notes	Railway line	Reference
Railways and Electric Telegraph Protection Act 1871	12 January 1871	Protection of railways	—	
Railway Survey Act 1873	11 July 1873	Permits the surveying of land for the purpose of constructing a railway	—	
Railways Act 1873	22 November 1873	Authorised construction of railways and tramways	—	
Geraldton and Northampton Railway Act 1873	22 November 1873	Authorised construction of the railway line from Geraldton and Northampton	Northampton railway line	
Railway Supplementary Loan Act 1875	3 January 1876	Authorised raising the sum of £26,000 through a loan for the completion of the railway line between Geraldton and Northampton	Northampton railway line	
Railways Act amendment (1877)	17 August 1877	Amendment to the Railways Act 1873	—	
The Eastern Railway Act 1878	24 July 1878	Authorised construction of the railway line from Fremantle to Guildford	Eastern Railway	
Railways Act 1878	24 July 1878	Supersedes the Railways and Electric Telegraph Protection Act 1871, Railway Survey Act 1873 and Railways Act 1873	–	
Railways Amendment Act 1879	26 August 1879	Amendment to the Railways Act 1878	—	
Railways Amendment Act 1881	7 April 1881	Amendment to the Railways Act 1878	—	
Eastern Railway Extension Act 1881	7 April 1881	Authorised construction of the railway line from Guildford to Chidlow's Well	Eastern Railway	
Railway Refreshment Room Licensing Act 1881	7 April 1881	Authorised the issuing of a certificate for a license to the keeper of a railway refreshment room	—	
Eastern Railway (Further) Amendment Act 1882	21 September 1882	Authorised construction of the railway line from Chidlow's Well to York	Eastern Railway	
Railways Amendment Act 1882	21 September 1882	Amendment to the Railways Act 1878	—	
Eastern Railway Terminus Act 1883	8 September 1883	Alterations to the terminus of the railway line at York	Eastern Railway	
Beverley–Albany Railway Act 1884	13 September 1884	Authorised construction of the railway line from Beverley to Albany	Great Southern Railway	
Eastern Railway Further Extension Act 1885	18 September 1885	Authorised construction of the railway line from York to Beverley	Eastern Railway	
Geraldton–Greenough Railway Act 1886	12 July 1886	Authorised construction of the railway line from Geraldton to Greenough	Midland railway line	
Eastern Railway, Spencer's Brook–Northam Branch Act 1886	12 July 1886	Authorised construction of the branch line from Spencer's Brook to Northam	Eastern Railway	
The Guildford–Greenough Flats Railway Act 1886	2 September 1886^{[1]}	Authorised construction of the railway line from Guildford to Greenough	Midland railway line	
Railway Servants Act 1887	22 July 1887	Empowers the Commissioner of Railways to appoint and dismiss certain classes of railway servants	—	
Bunbury Railway Act 1887	22 July 1887	Authorised construction of a railway line from Bunbury to Boyanup	Bunbury Railway	
Clackline–Newcastle Railway Act 1887	20 August 1887	Authorised construction of a railway line from Clackline to Newcastle (now Toodyay)	Clackline to Miling railway line	
Geraldton and Northampton Railway Amendment Act 1888	6 January 1888	Authorised the alteration of the route of the railway line from Geraldton and Northampton	Northampton railway line	
Beverley–Albany Railway contract (1888)	19 April 1888	Confirmed the contract and defined the route of the railway line from Beverley to Albany	Great Southern Railway	
Railways Amendment Act 1888	7 December 1888	Provided for the construction of accommodation works on railway lines	—	
Railway Act 1889	13 August 1889	Provided for the management and working of railways	—	

=== Acts 1890 to present ===
Acts by the Parliament of Western Australia:

Title	Date of assent	Notes	Railway line	Reference
South-Western Railway Act 1891	26 February 1891	Authorised construction of a railway line from Bayswater to Bunbury	South Western Railway	
Boyanup–Busselton Railway Act 1892	1 February 1892	Authorised construction of a railway line from Boyanup to Busselton	Flinders Bay railway line	
Boyanup–Minninup Railway Act 1892	1 February 1892	Authorised construction of a railway line from Boyanup to Minninup Bridge (Donnybrook)	Northcliffe railway line	
Yilgarn Railway Act 1892	18 March 1892	Authorised construction of a railway line from Northam to Southern Cross	Eastern Goldfields Railway	
Geraldton–Mullewa Railway Act 1892	18 March 1892	Authorised construction of a railway line from Geraldton to Mullewa	Geraldton to Mullewa railway line	
South-Western Railway Act 1891 Amendment Act 1892	18 March 1892	Authorised the alteration of the route of a railway line from Bayswater to Bunbury	South Western Railway	
Railways Act 1878 amendment (1892)	18 March 1892	Amendment to the Railways Act 1878	—	
Perth Railway Crossing Improvement Act 1892	13 January 1893	Authorised construction of the Barrack Street Bridge	—	
Midland Railway Loan Act 1893	13 January 1893	Authorised a loan to the Midland Railway Company to construct the railway line from Guildford to Walkaway	Midland railway line	
Railways Amendment Act 1893	13 October 1893	Amendment to the Railways Act 1878	—	
Eastern Railway Improvement Act 1893	13 October 1893	Authorised alterations of the railway line	Eastern Railway	
Railways Acts Amendment Act 1894	23 November 1894	Amendment to the Railways Act 1878	—	
Mullewa–Cue Railway Act 1894	23 November 1894	Authorised construction of the railway line from Mullewa to Cue	Mullewa to Meekatharra railway line	
Southern Cross–Coolgardie Railway Act 1894	23 November 1894	Authorised construction of a railway line from Southern Cross to Coolgardie	Eastern Goldfields Railway	
Railway and Theatre Refreshment Rooms Licensing Act 1895	11 September 1895	Regulates licensing for railway and theatre refreshment rooms	—	
Coolgardie–Kalgoorlie Railway Act 1895	2 October 1895	Authorised construction of a railway line from Coolgardie to Kalgoorlie	Eastern Goldfields Railway	
Donnybrook–Bridgetown Railway Act 1895	12 October 1895	Authorised construction of a railway line from Donnybrook to Bridgetown	Northcliffe railway line	
Collie Coalfields Railway Act 1895	12 October 1895	Authorised construction of the railway line from Brunswick Junction to Collie	Brunswick Junction to Narrogin railway line	
Streets and Roads Closure (Eastern Railway) Act 1896	23 September 1896	Authorised the closure of parts of streets along the railway line	Eastern Goldfields Railway	
Cue–Nannine Railway Act 1896	27 October 1896	Authorised construction of the railway line from Cue to Nannine	Mullewa–Meekatharra railway	
Railways Amendment Act 1896	27 October 1896	Amendment to the Railways Amendment Act 1879	—	
Kalgoorlie–Kanowna Railway Act 1896	27 October 1896	Authorised construction of a railway line from Kalgoorlie to Kanowna	Kanowna railway line	
York–Greenhills Railway Act 1896	27 October 1896	Authorised construction of the railway line from York to Greenhills	York–Bruce Rock railway line	
Perth Racecourse Railway Act 1896	27 October 1896	Authorised construction of the railway line from Bayswater to Perth Racecourse (Ascot)	Belmont railway line	
Great Southern Railway Purchase Act (1896)	27 October 1896	Purchase of the interest of the West Australian Land Company, including the railway line from Beverley to Albany	Great Southern Railway	
Kalgoorlie–Menzies Railway Act 1896	27 October 1896	Authorised construction of a railway line from Kalgoorlie to Menzies	Leonora railway line	
Bunbury Racecourse Railway Act 1897	23 December 1897	Authorised construction of a railway line from Bunbury to Bunbury Racecourse		
Collie Quarry Railway Act 1897	23 December 1897	Authorised construction of a short connection of railway line from the South Western to the Brunswick Junction to Collie railway line	Brunswick Junction to Narrogin railway line	
Kalgoorlie–Gnumballa Lake and Boulder Townsite Loop Railways Act 1897	23 December 1897	Authorised construction of a railway line from Kalgoorlie to Gnumballa Lake (Hannan's Lake or Lakeside) and a loop railway to Boulder	Kalgoorlie to Gnumballa Lake railway line	
Fremantle–Owen's Anchorage Railway Act 1897	23 December 1897	Authorised construction of a railway line from Fremantle to Owen Anchorage, south of Fremantle (towards Robbs Jetty)	Fremantle line	
Railways Amendment Act 1897	23 December 1897	Amendment to the Railways Act 1878	—	
Northam–Goomalling Railway Act 1899	16 December 1899	Authorised construction of a railway line from Northam to Goomalling	Northam to Goomalling railway line	
Menzies–Leonora Railway Act 1899	16 December 1899	Authorised construction of a railway line from Menzies to Leonora	Leonora railway line	
Fremantle Harbour Works Rocky Bay–Rous Head Additional Line of Railway Act 1899	16 December 1899	Authorised construction of a railway line from Rocky Bay to Rous Head, Fremantle Harbour	Fremantle line	
Railways Amendment Act 1900	5 December 1900	Amendment to the Railways Amendment Act 1881	—	
Brown Hill Loop Kalgoorlie–Gnumballa Lake Railway Act 1900	5 December 1900	Authorised construction of a loop railway line from Hannan's Street Station to Kamballie Station (Kalgoorlie)	Kalgoorlie to Gnumballa Lake railway line	
Railway and Theatre Refreshment Rooms Licensing Act Amendment Act 1902	7 October 1902	Amendment to the Railway and Theatre Refreshment Rooms Licensing Act 1895	—	
Railways Acts Amendment Act 1902	20 December 1902	Amendment to the Railways Acts	—	
Robb's Jetty–Woodman's Point Railway Act 1902	20 December 1902	Authorised construction of a railway line from Robbs Jetty to Woodman Point	Fremantle line	
Malcolm–Laverton Railway Act 1902	20 December 1902	Authorised construction of a railway line from Malcolm to Laverton	Malcolm to Laverton railway line	
Collie–Collie-Boulder Railway Act 1902	20 December 1902	Authorised construction of a railway line from Collie to Collie-Boulder	Brunswick Junction to Narrogin railway line (spur)	
Trans-Australian Railway Enabling Act (1903)	29 September 1903	Enables the Parliament of the Commonwealth to pass laws authorising construction of a railway line from Kalgoorlie to the state border and a spur line to Eucla	Trans-Australian Railway	
Collie–Narrogin Railway Act 1904	16 January 1904	Authorised construction of the railway line from Collie to Narrogin	Brunswick Junction to Narrogin railway line	
Jandakot Railway Act 1904	16 January 1904	Authorised construction of a railway line from Woodman Point to Jandakot	Spearwood–Armadale railway line	
Government Railways Act 1904	16 January 1904	Consolidation and amendment of the law relating to the maintenance and management of government railways	—	
Wagin–Dumbleyung Railway Act 1905	23 December 1905	Authorised construction of the railway line from Wagin to Dumbleyung	Wagin to Newdegate railway line	
Goomalling–Dowerin Railway Act 1905	23 December 1905	Authorised construction of the railway line from Goomalling to Dowerin	Goomalling to West Merredin railway line	
Katanning–Kojonup Railway Act 1905	23 December 1905	Authorised construction of the railway line from Katanning to Kojonup	Donnybrook to Katanning railway line	
Coolgardie–Norseman Railway Act 1906	14 December 1906	Authorised construction of the railway line from Coolgardie to Norseman	Esperance railway line	
Hopetoun–Ravensthorpe Railway Act 1906	14 December 1906	Authorised construction of the railway line from Hopetoun to Ravensthorpe	Hopetoun to Ravensthorpe railway line	
Donnybrook–Preston Valley Railway Act 1906	14 December 1906	Authorised construction of the railway line from Donnybrook to Boyup Brook	Donnybrook to Katanning railway line	
Greenhills–Quairading Railway Act 1906	14 December 1906	Authorised construction of the railway line from Greenhills to Quairading	York to Bruce Rock railway line	
Jandakot–Armadale Railway Act 1906	14 December 1906	Authorised construction of a railway line from Jandakot to Armadale	Spearwood–Armadale railway line	
Perth Railway Crossing Amendment Act 1906	14 December 1906	Amendment to the Perth Railway Crossing Improvement Act 1892, authorised demolishing and rebuilding of the Barrack Street Bridge	—	
Port Hedland–Marble Bar Railway Act 1907	19 September 1907	Authorised construction of a railway line from Port Hedland to Marble Bar	Marble Bar Railway	
Collie–Narrogin Railway amendment (1907)	19 September 1907	Amendment to the Collie–Narrogin Railway Act 1904	Brunswick Junction to Narrogin railway line	
Mt. Magnet–Black Range Railway Act 1907	20 December 1907	Authorised construction of the railway line from Mount Magnet to Sandstone	Sandstone railway line	
Pinjarra–Marrinup Railway Act 1907	20 December 1907	Authorised construction of the railway line from Pinjarra to Marrinup	Pinjarra to Narrogin railway	
Wonnerup–Nannup Railway Act 1907	20 December 1907	Authorised construction of the railway line from Jarrahwood to Nannup	Nannup railway line	
Narrogin–Wickepin Railway Act 1907	20 December 1907	Authorised construction of the railway line from Narrogin to Wickepin	Merredin to Narrogin railway line	
Government Railways Amendment Act 1907	20 December 1907	Amendment to the Government Railways Act 1904	—	
Newcastle–Bolgart Railway Act 1907	20 December 1907	Authorised construction of the railway line from Newcastle (now Toodyay) to Bolgart	Newcastle to Bolgart railway section of the Clackline to Miling railway line	
Bridgetown–Wilgarrup Railway Act 1909	19 January 1909	Authorised construction of the railway line from Bridgetown to Wilgarrup	Northcliffe railway line	
Upper Chapman Railway Act 1909	19 January 1909	Authorised construction of the railway line from Glenfield to Naraling	Upper Chapman Valley railway line	
Nannine–Meekatharra Railway Act 1909	6 February 1909	Authorised construction of the railway line from Nannine to Meekatharra	Mullewa to Meekatharra railway line	
Mount Lyell Mining and Railway Company Limited Lease Act 1909	4 December 1909	Grants a special lease of land to the Mount Lyell Mining & Railway Company in North Fremantle	—	
Boyup–Kojonup Railway Act 1909	21 December 1909	Authorised construction of the railway line from Boyup Brook to Kojonup	Donnybrook to Katanning railway line	
Goomalling–Wongan Hills Railway Act 1909	21 December 1909	Authorised construction of the railway line from Goomalling to Wongan Hills	Avon Yard to Mullewa railway line	
Dowerin–Merredin Railway Act 1909	21 December 1909	Authorised construction of the railway line from Dowerin to Merredin	Goomalling to West Merredin railway line	
Southern Cross–Bullfinch Railway Act 1910	22 December 1910	Authorised construction of the railway line from Southern Cross to Bullfinch	Wyalkatchem to Southern Cross railway line	
Bridgetown–Wilgarrup Railway Extension Act 1911	16 February 1911	Authorised construction of a 5 kilometres (3.1 mi) extension of the railway line south of Wilgarrup	Northcliffe railway line	
Katanning–Nampup Railway Act 1911	16 February 1911	Authorised construction of the railway line from Katanning to Nampup (now Nyabing)	Pingrup railway line	
Quairading–Nunajin Railway Act 1911	16 February 1911	Authorised construction of a railway line from Quairading to Nunajin, later renamed Bruce Rock	York–Bruce Rock railway line	
Wagin–Dumbleyung Railway Extension Act 1911	16 February 1911	Authorising construction of an extension from Dumbleyung to Kukerin	Wagin to Newdegate railway line	
Wickepin–Merredin Railway Act 1911	16 February 1911	Authorised construction of the railway line from Wickepin to Merredin	Merredin to Narrogin railway line	
Tambellup–Ongerup Railway Act 1911	16 February 1911	Authorised construction of the railway line from Tambellup to Ongerup	Ongerup railway line	
Northampton–Ajana Railway Act 1911	16 February 1911	Authorised construction of the railway line from Northampton to Ajana	Northampton railway line	
Naraling–Yuna Railway Act 1911	16 February 1911	Authorised construction of the railway line from Naraling to Yuna	Upper Chapman Valley railway line	
Brookton–Kunjinn Railway Act 1911	16 February 1911	Authorised construction of the railway line from Brookton to Kunjinn	Brookton to Corrigin railway	
Wongan Hills–Mullewa Railway Act 1911	16 February 1911	Authorised construction of the railway line from Wongan Hills to Mullewa	Avon Yard to Mullewa railway line	
Dwellingup–Hotham Railway Act 1911	16 February 1911	Authorised construction of the railway line from Dwellingup to Hotham	Pinjarra to Narrogin railway	
Marrinup Branch Railway Act 1911	8 January 1912	Declared a section of the railway line from Pinjarra to Marrinup as open	Pinjarra to Narrogin railway	
Trans-Continental Railway Act 1911	9 January 1912	Consent to the construction of the Western Australian section of the railway line from Kalgoorlie to Port Augusta	Trans-Australian Railway	
Upper Darling Range Railway Extension Act 1911	9 January 1912	Authorised construction of an extension of the railway line from Canning Mills	Upper Darling Range railway	
Hotham–Crossman Railway Act 1911	9 January 1912	Authorised construction of the railway line from Hotham to Crossman	Pinjarra to Narrogin railway	
Yillimining–Kodinin Railway Act 1911	9 January 1912	Authorised construction of the railway line from Yilliminning to Kondinin	Merredin to Yilliminning railway line	
Fremantle–Kalgoorlie (Merredin–Coolgardie Section) Railway Act 1912	10 October 1912	Authorised construction of a second track of the railway line from Merredin to Coolgardie	Eastern Goldfields Railway	
Wagin–Bowelling Railway Act 1912	24 December 1912	Authorised construction of the railway line from Wagin to Bowelling	Wagin to Bowelling railway line	
Newcastle–Bolgart Railway Extension Act 1912	24 December 1912	Authorised construction of a 50 kilometres (31 mi) extension of the railway line from Bolgart	Clackline to Miling railway line	
Hotham–Crossman Railway Extension Act 1912	24 December 1912	Authorised construction of a 8.8 kilometres (5.5 mi) extension of the railway line from Crossman	Pinjarra to Narrogin railway	
Wyalcatchem–Mount Marshall Railway Act 1912	24 December 1912	Authorised construction of the railway line from Wyalcatchem to Bencubbin	Wyalkatchem to Southern Cross railway line	
Flinders Bay–Margaret River Railway Act 1913	30 December 1913^{[2]}	Authorised the purchase by the Government of the Flinders Bay–Margaret River Railway	Flinders Bay railway line	
Railway Survey Act 1913	30 December 1913	Authorised the survey of certain railways	—	
Eastern Railway siding (1914)	22 September 1914	Authorised construction, maintenance and working of a siding at East Perth	Eastern Railway	
Wagin–Kukerin Railway Extension Act 1914	12 January 1915	Authorised construction of the railway line from Kukerin to Lake Grace	Wagin to Newdegate railway line	
Pinjarra–Dwarda Railway Extension Act 1914	18 February 1915	Authorised construction of the railway line extension from Dwarda to Narrogin	Pinjarra to Narrogin railway	
Yilliminning–Kondinin Railway Extension Act 1914	18 February 1915	Authorised construction of the railway line extension from Kondinin to Merredin	Merredin to Yilliminning railway line	
Esperance Northwards Railway Act 1914	10 February 1915	Authorised construction of a 97 kilometres (60 mi) railway line extension from Esperance	Esperance railway line	
Katanning–Nyabing Railway Extension Act 1914	18 February 1915	Authorised construction of the railway line from Nyabing to Pingrup	Pingrup railway line	
Boyanup–Busselton Railway Extension Act 1914	18 February 1915	Authorised construction of the railway line from Busselton to Margaret River	Flinders Bay railway line	
Newcastle–Bolgart Railway Extension Act 1915	27 September 1915	Authorised construction of a 7 kilometres (4.3 mi) extension of the railway line from Bolgart	Clackline to Miling railway line	
Flinders Bay–Margaret River Railway Act 1916	5 December 1916	Confirmed the purchase by the Government of the Flinders Bay–Margaret River railway	Flinders Bay railway line	
Midland Railway Act 1919	15 November 1919^{[1]}	Vest in the Midland Railway Company of Western Australia the lands acquired for the purpose of its railway	Midland railway line	
Ajana–Geraldine Railway Act 1919	17 December 1919	Authorised construction of the railway line from Ajana to the Surprise mine at Geraldine	Ajana to Geraldine railway line	
Wyalcatchem–Mount Marshall Railway Extension Act 1919	17 December 1919	Authorised construction of the railway line from Bencubbin to Mukinbudin	Wyalkatchem to Southern Cross railway line	
Piawaning Northwards Railway Act 1920	31 December 1920	Authorised construction of the railway line from Piawaning to Miling	Clackline to Miling railway line	
Railways Classification Board Act 1920	31 December 1920^{[3]}	Provided for a Board for the classification of the salaried staff of the Government Railways	—	
Meekatharra–Horseshoe Railway Act 1920	31 December 1920	Authorised construction of the railway line from Meekatharra to the Horseshoe mine, north-west of Peak Hill	Meekatharra to Horseshoe railway line	
Railway Siding (North Fremantle) Act 1922	31 January 1922	Authorised construction, maintenance and working of a siding at North Fremantle	Fremantle line	
Wyalcatchem–Mount Marshall Railway (Extension No. 2) Act 1922	13 November 1922	Authorised construction of the railway line from Mukinbudin to Lake Brown	Wyalkatchem to Southern Cross railway line	
Esperance Northwards Railway Extension Act 1922	30 December 1922	Authorised construction of a 10 kilometres (6.2 mi) railway line extension to Salmon Gums	Esperance railway line	
Busselton–Margaret River Railway Deviation Act 1922	22 February 1923	Authorised a deviation of the railway line	Flinders Bay railway line	
Albany–Denmark Railway Extension Act 1923	22 February 1923	Authorised construction of the railway line from Denmark to Nornalup	Elleker to Nornalup railway line	
Bridgetown–Jarnadup Railway Extension Act 1923	22 February 1923	Authorised construction of the railway line from Jarnadup (now Jardee) to Northcliffe	Northcliffe railway line	
Pinjarra–Dwarda Railway Extension Act Amendment Act 1923	23 November 1923	Amendment to the Pinjarra–Dwarda Railway Extension Act 1914	Pinjarra to Narrogin railway	
Busselton–Margaret River Railway Deviation No. 2 Act 1923	15 December 1923	Authorised a deviation of the railway line	Flinders Bay railway line	
Flinders Bay–Margaret River Railway Deviation No. 1 Act 1923	15 December 1923	Authorised a deviation of the railway line	Flinders Bay railway line	
Geraldton Harbour Works Railway Act 1923	22 December 1923	Authorised construction of the railway line in connection to the Geraldton Harbour works	Geraldton Harbour works railway line	
Lake Grace–Newdegate Railway Act 1923	22 December 1923	Authorised construction of the railway line from Lake Grace to Newdegate	Wagin to Newdegate railway line	
Brookton–Dale River Railway Act 1923	22 December 1923	Authorised construction of the railway line from Brookton to the Dale River (surveyed but not constructed)	Brookton to Armadale railway line	
Yarramony–Eastward Railway Act 1923	22 December 1923	Authorised construction of a 137 kilometres (85 mi) railway line from Yarramony (surveyed but not constructed)	Yarramony–Eastward railway line	
Waroona–Lake Clifton Railway Act 1924	31 December 1924	Authorised the discontinuance of the railway line	Waroona to Lake Clifton railway line	
Norseman–Salmon Gums Railway Act 1924	31 December 1924	Authorised construction of the railway line from Norseman to Salmon Gums	Esperance railway line	
Lake Brown–Bullfinch Railway Act 1926	16 December 1926	Authorised construction of the railway line from Lake Brown to Bullfinch	Wyalkatchem to Southern Cross railway line	
Ejanding Northwards Railway Act 1926	16 December 1926	Authorised construction of the railway line from Amery (formerly Ejanding) to Kalannie, with a spur line from Burakin to Kulja	Kalannie railway line; Bonnie Rock railway line	
Boyup Brook–Cranbrook Railway Act 1926	16 December 1926	Authorised construction of the railway line from Boyup Brook to Cranbrook (surveyed and partially constructed but not completed)	Boyup Brook–Cranbrook railway line	
Manjimup–Mount Barker Railway Act 1926	24 December 1926	Authorised construction of the railway line from Manjimup to Mount Barker (not constructed)	Manjimup to Mount Barker railway line	
Government Railways Act Amendment Act 1926	24 December 1926	Amendment to the Government Railways Act 1904	—	
Leighton–Robb's Jetty Railway Act 1927	23 December 1927	Authorised construction of 14 kilometres (8.7 mi) of railway line and branch line from Leighton to Robbs Jetty (not constructed)	Fremantle line	
Meekatharra–Wiluna Railway Act 1927	23 December 1927	Authorised construction of the railway line from Meekatharra to Wiluna	Meekatharra to Wiluna railway	
Kulja Eastward Railway Act 1928	20 October 1928	Authorised construction of the railway line from Kulja to Bonnie Rock	Burakin to Bonnie Rock railway line	
Railways Discontinuance Act 1928	10 December 1928	Authorised partial closure of two railway lines in Western Australia	Kanowna railway line; Kalgoorlie to Lakeside railway line (Kamballie to Lakeside section)	
Quarry Railway Extension Act 1928	21 December 1928	Authorised construction of a railway to extend the Fremantle Harbour works quarry railway to North Fremantle	Fremantle line	
Lake Grace–Karlgarin Railway Act 1928	27 December 1928	Authorised construction of the railway line from Lake Grace to Karlgarin	Lake Grace to Hyden railway line	
Yuna–Dartmoor Railway Act 1933	24 November 1933	Authorised construction of the railway line from Yuna to Dartmoor (surveyed but not constructed)	Upper Chapman Valley railway line	
Southern Cross Southwards Railway Act 1933	24 November 1933	Authorised construction of 45 kilometres (28 mi) of railway line south of Southern Cross (surveyed but not constructed)	Southern Cross southwards railway line	
Government Railways Act Amendment Act 1933	4 January 1934	Amendment to the Government Railways Act 1904	—	
Bunbury Racecourse Railway Discontinuance Act 1935	17 September 1935	Authorised the discontinuance of the railway line		
Railways Classification Board Act Amendment Act 1935	6 January 1936	Amendment to the Railways Classification Board Act 1920	—	
Cue–Big Bell Railway Act 1936	3 November 1936	Authorised construction of the railway line from Cue to Big Bell	Cue to Big Bell railway line	
Geraldton Harbour Works Railway Extension Act 1939	5 October 1939	Authorised construction of a railway line to extend the Geraldton Harbour works railway to the industrial area of Geraldton	Geraldton Harbour works railway line	
Government Railways Act Amendment Act 1939	22 November 1939	Amendment to the Government Railways Act 1904	—	
Railways Classification Board Act Amendment Act 1945	9 January 1946	Amendment to the Railways Classification Board Act 1920	—	
Railway (Hopetoun–Ravensthorpe) Discontinuance Act 1946	13 November 1946	Authorised the discontinuance of the railway line from Hopetoun to Ravensthorpe	Hopetoun to Ravensthorpe railway line	
Government Railways Act Amendment Act 1947	10 January 1948	Amendment to the Government Railways Act 1904	—	
Railway (Brown Hill Loop Kalgoorlie–Gnumballa Lake) Discontinuance Act 1948	11 November 1948	Authorised the discontinuance of the loop railway from Hannan's Street station to Kamballie station via Brown Hill	Kalgoorlie to Gnumballa Lake railway line	
Railway (Mt. Magnet–Black Range) Discontinuance Act 1948	21 January 1949	Authorised the discontinuance of the railway line from Mount Magnet to Sandstone	Sandstone railway line	
Government Railways Act Amendment Act 1948	25 January 1949	Amendment to the Government Railways Act 1904	—	
Railways Classification Board Act Amendment Act 1950	15 November 1950	Amendment to the Railways Classification Board Act 1920	—	
Railway (Port Hedland–Marble Bar) Discontinuance Act 1950	18 December 1950	Authorised the discontinuance of the railway line from Port Hedland to Marble Bar	Marble Bar Railway	
Welshpool–Bassendean Railway Act 1950	29 December 1950	Authorised construction of the railway line from Welshpool to Bassendean (not constructed)	Welshpool to Bassendean railway line	
Railway (Upper Darling Range) Discontinuance Act 1950	29 December 1950	Authorised the discontinuance of the railway line	Upper Darling Range railway	
Muja–Centaur Coal Mine Railway Act 1951	20 November 1951	Authorised construction of a spur line from Muja to the Centaur coal mine	Brunswick Junction to Narrogin railway line (spur)	
Government Railways Act Amendment Act 1951	19 December 1951	Amendment to the Government Railways Act 1904	—	
Collie–Cardiff Railway Act 1951	20 December 1951	Authorised construction of a railway line from Collie–Cardiff to the Western No. 2 mine	Brunswick Junction to Narrogin railway line (spur)	
Railway (Mundaring–Mundaring Weir) Discontinuance Act 1952	14 November 1952	Authorised the discontinuance of the railway line from Mundaring to Mundaring Weir	Mundaring Weir railway line	
Coogee–Kwinana Railway Act 1952	19 November 1952	Authorised construction of a railway line from Coogee to Kwinana	Kwinana railway line	
Collie–Griffin Mine Railway Act 1953	10 November 1953	Authorised construction of the spur line from Collie to the Griffin mine	Brunswick Junction to Narrogin railway line (spur)	
Upper Darling Range Railway Lands Revestment Act 1953	18 December 1953	Revest in Her Majesty certain rights and land	Upper Darling Range railway	
Government Railways Act Amendment Act 1953	18 January 1954	Amendment to the Government Railways Act 1904	—	
Government Railways Act Amendment Act 1954	14 September 1954	Amendment to the Government Railways Act 1904	—	
Government Railways Act Amendment Act 1955	13 December 1955	Amendment to the Government Railways Act 1904	—	
Belmont Branch Railway Discontinuance and Land Revestment Act 1956	7 December 1956	Authorised the discontinuance of the railway line from Bayswater to Belmont	Belmont railway line	
Government Railways Act Amendment Act 1957	18 November 1957	Amendment to the Government Railways Act 1904	—	
Midland Junction–Welshpool Railway Act 1957	6 December 1957^{[4]}	Authorised construction of a railway line from Midland Junction to Welshpool	Midland Junction to Welshpool railway line	
Government Railways Act Amendment Act 1958	6 October 1958	Amendment to the Government Railways Act 1904	—	
Government Railways Act Amendment Act (No. 2) 1958	11 December 1958	Amendment to the Government Railways Act 1904	—	
Government Railways Act Amendment Act 1959	8 September 1959	Amendment to the Government Railways Act 1904	—	
Railways Classification Board Act Amendment Act 1959	8 October 1959	Amendment to the Railways Classification Board Act 1920	—	
Kalgoorlie–Parkeston Railway Act 1959	30 October 1959^{[1]}	Authorised operation and maintenance of the railway line from Kalgoorlie to Parkeston	Kalgoorlie to Parkeston railway line	
Government Railways Act Amendment Act 1960	2 December 1960	Amendment to the Government Railways Act 1904	—	
Railways (Cue–Big Bell and other Railways) Discontinuance Act 1960	12 December 1960	Authorised closure of 13 railway lines in Western Australia	Brookton to Corrigin; Elleker to Nornalup; Busselton to Flinders Bay; Gnowangerup to Ongerup; Nyabing to Pingrup; Malcolm to Laverton railway line; Meekatharra to Wiluna; Mukinbudin to Bullfinch; Cue to Big Bell; Geraldton to Ajana; Boddington to Narrogin; Southern Cross to Bullfinch; Wokarina to Yuna	
Coogee–Kwinana (Deviation) Railway Act 1961	10 October 1961	Authorised construction of a railway deviating from the Coogee to Kwinana railway line	Kwinana railway line	
Railway Standardisation Agreement Act 1961	30 October 1961	Approved certain agreements between the Commonwealth and the State in relation to the standardisation of certain railways	—	
Railways (Standard Gauge) Construction Act 1961	30 October 1961	Authorised construction of a railway line from Kalgoorlie to Kwinana, Midland Junction to East Perth, Kewdale to Kwinana and Kalgoorlie to Kamballie	—	
Spearwood–Cockburn Cement Pty. Limited Railway Act 1961	6 November 1961	Authorised construction of a railway line from Spearwood to the works site of Cockburn Cement Pty. Limited	Kwinana railway line	
Kwinana–Mundijong–Jarrahdale Railway Act 1961	23 November 1961	Authorised construction of a railway line from Kwinana to Jarrahdale through Mundijong	Kwinana railway line	
Tallering Peak–Mullewa Railway Act 1961	28 November 1961	Authorised construction of a railway line from Tallering Peak to Mullewa	Tallering Peak to Mullewa railway line	
Mount Goldsworthy–Ord Ranges–Depuch Island Railway Act 1962	20 November 1962	Authorised construction of a railway line from Mount Goldsworthy to Depuch Island and a spur line to the Ord Ranges	Goldsworthy railway	
Spencer's Brook–Northam Railway Extension Act 1963	5 November 1963	Authorised an extension of the Spencer's Brook to Northam railway	Eastern Railway	
Railway (Portion of Tambellup–Ongerup Railway) Discontinuance and Land Revestment Act 1963	5 November 1963	Authorised the discontinuance of a portion of the railway line from Tambellup to Ongerup in Gnowangerup	Ongerup railway line	
Government Railways Act Amendment Act 1963	13 November 1963	Amendment to the Government Railways Act 1904	—	
The Midland Railway Company of Western Australia Limited Acquisition Agreement Act 1963	9 December 1963^{[1]}	Approved an agreement between the Midland Railway Company of Western Australia, the State and the Commissioners of the Rural and Industries Bank of Western Australia	Midland railway line	
Railways (Standard Gauge) Construction Act Amendment Act 1963	18 December 1963	Amendment of the Railways (Standard Gauge) Construction Act 1961	—	
Bellevue–Mount Helena Railway Discontinuance and Land Revestment Act 1964	4 November 1964	Authorised the discontinuance of the railway line from Bellevue to Mount Helena	Mundaring railway line	
Bibra Lake–Armadale Railway Discontinuance and Land Revestment Act 1964	4 November 1964	Authorised the discontinuance of the railway line from Bibra Lake to Armadale	Spearwood–Armadale railway line	
Morawa–Koolanooka Hills Railway Act 1964	19 November 1964	Authorised construction of a railway line from Morawa to Koolanooka Hills	Morawa to Koolanooka Hills railway line	
Government Railways Act Amendment Act 1965	9 November 1965	Amendment to the Government Railways Act 1904	—	
Clackline–Bolgart and Bellevue–East Northam Railway Discontinuance and Land Revestment Act 1965	25 November 1965^{[2]}	Authorised the discontinuance of the railway lines from Clackline to Bolgart and from Bellevue to East Northam	Clackline to Miling railway line; Mundaring railway line	
Industrial Lands (Kwinana) Railway Act 1966	17 October 1966	Authorised construction of a railway line at Kwinana	Kwinana railway line	
Private Railways (Level Crossings) Act 1966	12 December 1966	Relats to level crossings over private railways	—	
Railway (Collie–Griffin Mine Railway) Discontinuance Act 1967	21 November 1967^{[2]}	Authorised closure of the spur line from Collie to the Griffin mine	Brunswick Junction to Narrogin railway line (spur)	
Railway (Midland–Walkaway Railway) Discontinuance Act 1967	21 November 1967	Authorised the discontinuance of a portion of the railway line from Midland to Walkaway	Midland railway line	
Government Railways Act Amendment Act 1967	21 November 1967	Amendment to the Government Railways Act 1904	—	
Kwinana–Mundijong–Jarrahdale Railway Extension Act 1967	5 December 1967	Authorised construction of an extension of the railway line from Kwinana to Jarrahdale through Mundijong	Kwinana railway line	
Railways Discontinuance and Land Revestment Act 1968	25 October 1968^{[2]}	Authorised the discontinuance of portions of four railway lines	Goomalling to West Merredin railway line; Eastern Goldfields Railway; Merredin to Narrogin railway line; Northampton railway line	
Kwinana Loop Railway Act 1968	6 November 1968	Authorised construction of a loop railway line at the Kwinana Grain Terminal	Kwinana railway line	
Mangles Bay Railway Act 1968	6 November 1968^{[2]}	Authorised construction of a railway line south of the Kwinana Grain Terminal	Kwinana railway line	
Lake Lefroy (Coolgardie–Esperance Wharf) Railway Act 1969	21 May 1969	Authorised construction of a railway line to connect the Esperance branch railway to the Esperance land backed wharf and construction of a spur railway to Lake Lefroy	Esperance railway line	
Bunbury Harbour (East Perth–Bunbury) Railway Act 1970	20 May 1970	Authorised construction of a spur railway line to the foreshore of the Bunbury Harbour and a railway line connecting that spur to the Bunbury station yard	South Western Railway	
Railways Discontinuance and Land Revestment Act 1970	5 November 1970^{[2]}	Authorised the discontinuance of a railway line and portions of another railway line	Eastern Goldfields Railway; Northam to Goomalling railway line (partially)	
Government Railways Act Amendment Act 1970	5 November 1970	Amendment to the Government Railways Act 1904	—	
West Kalgoorlie–Lake Lefroy Railway Act 1970	8 December 1970	Authorised construction of a railway between West Kalgoorlie and Lake Lefroy	West Kalgoorlie to Lake Lefroy railway line	
Government Railways Act Amendment Act 1971	1 December 1971	Amendment to the Government Railways Act 1904	—	
Railway Standardisation Agreement Act Amendment Act 1971	10 December 1971	Amendment to the Railway Standardisation Agreement Act 1961	—	
West Kambalda Railway Act 1972	9 June 1972	Authorised construction of a spur railway line to the Western Mining Corporation's Kambalda Nickel Operations	Kambalda to Redmine railway line	
Government Railways Act Amendment Act 1972	16 November 1972	Amendment to the Government Railways Act 1904	—	
Perth Regional Railway Act 1972	6 December 1972^{[1]}	Authorized the discontinuance of portion of the railway line from Fremantle to Guildford and construction of a Perth regional railway	Fremantle line	
Railway (Coogee–Kwinana Railway) Discontinuance Act 1973	6 June 1973^{[2]}^{[5]}	Authorized the discontinuance of the railway line from Coogee to Naval Base	Kwinana railway line	
Railway (Kalgoorlie–Parkeston) Discontinuance and Land Revestment Act 1973	6 November 1973^{[2]}^{[5]}	Authorized the discontinuance of the railway line from Kalgoorlie to Parkeston	Kalgoorlie to Parkeston railway line	
Railway (Bunbury to Boyanup) Discontinuance, Revestment and Construction Act 1973	6 December 1973	Authorized the discontinuance of the railway line from Bunbury to Boyanup as well as construction of a railway line in the same section	Northcliffe railway line	
Government Railways Act Amendment Act 1973	27 December 1973	Amendment to the Government Railways Act 1904	—	
Alumina Refinery (Worsley) Agreement Act 1973	28 November 1973	Authorised construction of an alumina refinery at Worsley and an associated railway line from the refinery to the existing railway line between Brunswick Junction and Collie	Brunswick Junction to Narrogin railway line (spur)	
Dongara–Eneabba Railway Act 1974	23 October 1974	Authorised construction of a railway line from Dongara to Eneabba	Dongara–Eneabba railway line	
Railways Discontinuance and Land Revestment Act 1974	29 October 1974^{[2]}	Authorized the discontinuance of six railway lines	Kalgoorlie to Gnumballa Lake railway line; Boulder Townsite loop railway line; Brown Hill loop Kalgoorlie–Gnumballa Lake railway line; Coolgardie to Kalgoorlie railway line; Coolgardie to Lake Lefroy railway line; Ongerup railway line	
Railways Discontinuance and Land Revestment Act 1975	18 September 1975^{[2]}	Authorized the discontinuance of the railway line from Dwellingup to Boddington	Pinjarra to Narrogin railway	
Government Railways Act Amendment Act (No. 2) 1975	7 November 1975	Amendment to the Government Railways Act 1904	—	
Government Railways Act Amendment Act 1975	14 November 1975	Amendment to the Government Railways Act 1904	—	
Government Railways Act Amendment Act 1976	9 June 1975	Amendment to the Government Railways Act 1904	—	
Railways Classification Board Act Amendment Act 1977	7 November 1977	Amendment to the Railways Classification Board Act 1920	—	
Government Railways Act Amendment Act 1977	18 November 1977	Amendment to the Government Railways Act 1904	—	
Railways Discontinuance and Land Revestment Act 1978	18 May 1978^{[2]}	Authorized the discontinuance of the railway line from Fremantle Harbour works quarry railway to North Fremantle	Fremantle line	
Government Railways Act Amendment Act 1978	17 November 1978	Amendment to the Government Railways Act 1904	—	
Government Railways Act Amendment Act 1979	25 October 1979	Amendment to the Government Railways Act 1904	—	
Railways Discontinuance Act 1980	15 October 1980^{[2]}	Authorized the discontinuance of the railway line from Pindar to Meekatharra	Mullewa to Meekatharra railway line	
Government Railways Amendment Act 1980	5 December 1980	Amendment to the Government Railways Act 1904	—	
Government Railways Amendment Act 1982	14 May 1982	Amendment to the Government Railways Act 1904	—	
Railways Discontinuance Act 1985	12 April 1985^{[2]}	Authorized the discontinuance of parts of two railway lines	Brunswick Junction to Narrogin railway line (spur); Northcliffe railway line	
Bunbury Railway Lands Act 1985	6 May 1985^{[1]}	Revested certain lands, enabled the grant of certain lands to the Western Australian Government Railways Commission	South Western Railway	
Government Railways Amendment Act 1987	25 June 1987	Amendment to the Government Railways Act 1904	—	
Perth–Joondalup Railway Act 1989	15 January 1990	Authorised construction of a railway from Perth to Joondalup	Joondalup line	
Government Railways Amendment Act (No. 2) 1990	17 December 1990	Amendment to the Government Railways Act 1904	—	
Government Railways Amendment Act 1990	17 December 1990	Amendment to the Government Railways Act 1904	—	
Railway Discontinuance Act 1996	25 October 1996^{[2]}	Authorized the discontinuance of parts of a railway line in Bunbury	South Western Railway	
Government Railways Amendment Act 1996	25 October 1996	Amendment to the Government Railways Act 1904	—	
Government Railways Amendment Act 1998	6 July 1998	Amendment to the Government Railways Act 1904	—	
Railways (Access) Act 1998	30 November 1998	To promote competition in the operation of rail services	—	
Railway (Northern and Southern Urban Extensions) Act 1999	8 December 1999	Authorised construction and expansion of two railway lines	Joondalup line; Mandurah line	
Railways (Access) Amendment Act 2000	28 November 2000	Amendment to the Railways (Access) Act 1998	—	
Railway (Narngulu to Geraldton) Act 2001	29 August 2001	Authorised construction of the railway line from Narngulu to the Port of Geraldton	Geraldton to Narngulu railway line	
Railway (Jandakot to Perth) Act 2002	5 December 2002	Authorised construction of the railway line from Jandakot to Perth	Mandurah line	
Public Transport Authority Act 2003	26 May 2003	Established the Public Transport Authority	—	
Railway and Port (The Pilbara Infrastructure Pty Ltd) Agreement Act 2004	8 December 2004	Ratifies and authorises an agreement to develop a railway in the Pilbara region	Fortescue railway	
Railway Discontinuance Act 2006	30 March 2006	Authorised closure of two railway lines in Western Australia	Fremantle to Kwinana railway; Midland Junction railway	
Statute Law Revision Act 2006	4 July 2006	Act to repeal various obsolete written laws, among them 15 railway-related acts	—	
Railway Discontinuance Act (No. 2) 2006	13 December 2006	Authorised closure of railway lines in Western Australia	Northern Railway	
Public Transport Authority Amendment Act 2008	3 July 2008	Amendment to the Public Transport Authority Act 2003	—	
Railway (Tilley to Karara) Act 2010	7 July 2010	Authorised construction of the railway line from Tilley to Karara	Karara railway	
Railway (Butler to Brighton) Act 2010	7 July 2010	Authorised construction of the railway line from Butler to Brighton	Joondalup line	
Railway (Roy Hill Infrastructure Pty Ltd) Agreement Act 2010	28 October 2010	Ratifies and authorises an agreement to develop a railway in the Pilbara region	Roy Hill railway	
Railway and Port (The Pilbara Infrastructure Pty Ltd) Agreement Amendment Act 2010	10 December 2010	Amendment to the Railway and Port (The Pilbara Infrastructure Pty Ltd) Agreement Act 2004 and the Railways (Access) Act 1998	—	
Railway (Forrestfield–Airport Link) Act 2015	2 November 2015	Authorised construction of the railway line from Bayswater to Forrestfield	Airport line	
Railway (BBI Rail Aus Pty Ltd) Agreement Act 2017	5 December 2017	Ratifies an agreement to develop a railway in the Pilbara region	—	
Railway and Port (The Pilbara Infrastructure Pty Ltd) Agreement Amendment Act 2018	15 May 2018	Amendment to the Railway and Port (The Pilbara Infrastructure Pty Ltd) Agreement Act 2004	—	
Railway (METRONET) Act 2018	19 November 2018	Authorised the extensions of the Thornlie line to Cockburn Central and the Joondalup line to Yanchep as part of Metronet	Thornlie line; Joondalup line	
Railway (METRONET) Amendment Act 2020	27 February 2020	Amendment to Railway (METRONET) Act 2018. Authorised construction of a railway from Bayswater to Ellenbrook (known as the Morley–Ellenbrook Line)	Morley–Ellenbrook line	
Railway (BBI Rail Aus Pty Ltd) Agreement Amendment Act 2021	17 August 2021	Amendment to the Railway (BBI Rail Aus Pty Ltd) Agreement Act 2017	—	
Railway (METRONET) Amendment Act 2022	16 August 2022	Amendment to Railway (METRONET) Act 2018. Authorised construction of a railway from Claisebrook Station to Mundijong (known as the Armadale Line and Byford Rail Extension)	Armadale line	
Government Railways Amendment Act 2022	21 November 2022	Amendment to the Government Railways Act 1904	—	

== See also ==
- Agricultural railways of Western Australia

== Notes ==
- ^[1] Repealed by the Public Transport Authority Act 2003
- ^[2] Repealed by the Statute Law Revision Act 2006
- ^[3] Repealed by the Acts Amendment and Repeal (Industrial Relations) Act (No. 2) 1984
- ^[4] Repealed by the Statutes (Repeals) Act 2014
- ^[5] The Railway (Coogee–Kwinana Railway) Discontinuance Act 1973 was the last railway-related act to use Imperial units, the Railway (Kalgoorlie–Parkeston) Discontinuance and Land Revestment Act 1973 the first to use the Metric system
