= Agricultural railways of Western Australia =

Railway lines in Western Australia

The agricultural railways in Western Australia were a system of railway lines that were built after the Western Australian 1905 Royal Commission on Immigration, which stated the need for a policy that "all considerable areas of agricultural land must have a 15 mile rail service." The lines were designed and constructed by the Public Works Department, for the Western Australian Government Railways. The railways were identified in the early 1900s as specifically light with 40 lb rails, and required for the agricultural region. The Railway Advisory Board of Western Australia was the administrative body that considered the viability of the proposed lines.

== Royal commissions ==
The Western Australian 1947 Royal Commission into the Management Workings and Control of the Western Australian Government Railways also placed these railway lines and their construction into context:

In order to carry out the wishes of the Government to construct railway in agricultural areas as cheaply as possible, lines were built with 45 lb rail sections which practically followed the surface of the ground, with (a) earth ballasting (b) half round timber sleepers (c) providing the bare minimum station facilities.

The 1947 commission called these lines spur lines at time of construction, in distinction to loop lines, however the completion of most sections made most lines loop lines.

The 1947 royal commission report also made a distinction between Southern Agricultural Spur Lines, Northern Agricultural Spur Lines, and South West dairy and timber lines; these broadly relate to geographical regions.

In the 2000s the lines were collectively identified as Wheatbelt railway lines of Western Australia.

== Agricultural spur lines ==
In many cases of the lines listed here, specific sections of line are named, where they were later joined to complete a longer route. This list is comparable with the list of sections in the second edition of Rails through the Bush, by Gunzburg and Austin, that identifies the builder of the section, and contract and completion dates.

Line section	Length in miles	Agricultural area	Year opened
Narrogin–Darkan	50	Southern	1906
Wagin–Dumbleying	25	Southern	1907
Katanning–Kojonup	33	Southern	1907
Collie–Darkan	40	Southern	1907
Greenhills–Quairading	31	Southern	1908
Donnybrook–Noggerup	23	Southern	1908
Narrogin–Wickepin	26	Southern	1909
Noggerup–Boyup Brook	23	Southern	1909
Katanning–Nyabing	38	Southern	1912
Dumbleyung–Kukerin	24	Southern	1912
Boyup–Kojonup	51	Southern	1912
Tambellup–Gnowangerup	24	Southern	1912
Gnowangerup–Ongerup	35	Southern	1913
Quairading–Bruce Rock	49	Southern	1913
Merredin–Bruce Rock	31	Southern	1913
Wickepin–Corrigin	40	Southern	1914
Corrigin–Bruce Rock	37	Southern	1914
Yilliminning–Kondinin	73	Southern	1915
Brookton–Corrigin	56	Southern	1915
Kukerin–Lake Grace	24	Southern	1916
Wagin–Bokal	34	Southern	1917
Kondinin–Narambeen	32	Southern	1917
Bokal–Bowelling	28	Southern	1918
Nyabing–Pingrup	22	Southern	1923
Narrambeen–Merredin	54	Southern	1925
Lake Grace–Newdegate	39	Southern	1926
Dwarda–Narrogin	37	Southern	1926
Goomalling–Dowerin	15	Northern	1906
Toodyay–Bolgart	24	Northern	1910
Wokarina–Naraling	26	Northern	1910
Dowerin–Korrelocking	32	Northern	1911
Korrelocking–Kununoppin	28	Northern	1911
Goomalling–Wongan Hills	34	Northern	1911
Kununoppin–Merredin	37	Northern	1911
Southern Cross–Bullfinch	22	Northern	1911
Naraling–Yuna	12	Northern	1912
Northampton–Ajana	33	Northern	1913
Wongan Hills–Mullewa	198	Northern	1915
Wyalkatchem–Bencubbin	52	Northern	1917
Bolgart–Calingiri	15	Northern	1917
Calingiri–Piawaning	19	Northern	1919
Bencubbin–Kalkalling	32	Northern	1923
Piawaning–Miling	27	Northern	1925
Amery–Kalannie	61	Northern	1929
Burakin–Kulja	8	Northern	1929
Lake Brown–Bullfinch	50	Northern	1929
Kulja–Bonnie Rock	68	Northern	1931
Lake Grace–Hyden	58	Southern	1933

== See also ==
- List of Western Australian railway-related acts
