= Bullfinch (disambiguation) =

- A bullfinch is a bird belonging to one of two groups of passerine birds

Bullfinch can also refer to:

- Bullfinch (obstacle), an obstacle seen on the cross-country course in the sport of eventing
- USS Bullfinch, the name of two US Navy ships
- Bullfinch, Western Australia, a town in Australia

== See also ==
- Bulfinch (disambiguation)
