= List of acts of the Parliament of Western Australia from 1903 =

This is a list of acts of the Parliament of Western Australia for the year 1903.

== 1903 ==
=== Public acts ===
Short title, or popular name	Citation	Royal assent
Long title
	No. 1 of 1903	25 July 1903
An Act to apply out of the Consolidated Revenue Fund and from Moneys to Credit of the General Loan Fund the sum of One Million Pounds (Note: £1,000,000 in 1903 is equivalent to A$165,200,000 in 2022.) to the Service of the Year ending 30th June, 1904.
Co-operative and Provident Societies Act 1903	No. 2 of 1903	8 September 1903
An Act to provide for the Incorporation and Regulation of Co-operative and Provident Societies.
	No. 3 of 1903	29 September 1903
An Act to apply out of the Consolidated Revenue Fund the sum of Five Hundred Thousand Pounds (Note: £500,000 in 1903 is equivalent to A$82,600,000 in 2022.) to the Service of the Year ending 30th June, 1904.
Trans-Australian Railway Enabling Act 1903	No. 4 of 1903	29 September 1903
An Act to enable the Parliament of the Commonwealth to make laws for the construction and maintenance of a Railway from Kalgoorlie to the Eastern boundary of Western Australia, and of a Railway from the Port of Eucla to a point intersecting the route of the aforesaid Railway.
Bread Act 1903	No. 5 of 1903	13 October 1903
An Act to amend the Law relating to the Making and Sale of Bread.
Dog Act 1903	No. 6 of 1903	1 December 1903
An Act to consolidate and amend the Law relating to Dogs.
Merchant Shipping Act Application Act 1903	No. 7 of 1903	1 December 1903
An Act to apply Part II. of the Merchant Shipping Act, 1894, (Note: Merchant Shipping Act 1894 (57 & 58 Vict. c. 60 (Imp))) to British Ships registered at, trading with, or being at Ports in Western Australia.
Pharmacy and Poisons Act Amendment Act 1903	No. 8 of 1903	1 December 1903
An Act to further amend the Pharmacy and Poisons Act, 1894. (Note: Pharmacy and Poisons Act 1894 ( 58 Vict. No. 35))
Companies Duty Act Continuance Act 1903	No. 9 of 1903	1 December 1903
An Act to continue the Companies Duty Act, 1899, (Note: Companies Duty Act 1899 (63 Vict. No. 6)) for the recovery of Duties and Penalties payable thereunder.
Supreme Court Act Amendment Act 1903	No. 10 of 1903	5 December 1903
An Act to amend the Supreme Court Act, 1880. (Note: Supreme Court Act 1880 (44 Vict. No. 10))
Election of Senators Act 1903	No. 11 of 1903	11 December 1903
An Act to provide for the Election of Senators for Western Australia to the Senate of the Commonwealth.
Tramways Act Amendment Act 1903	No. 12 of 1903	17 December 1903
An Act to amend the Tramways Act, 1885. (Note: Tramways Act 1885 (49 Vict. No. 23))
Administration Act 1903	No. 13 of 1903	31 December 1903
An Act to consolidate and amend the law relating to Probate and Administration and the Duties on the Estates of Deceased Persons, and for other purposes.
Prisons Act 1903	No. 14 of 1903	31 December 1903
An Act to consolidate and amend the Law relating to Prisons.
Lunacy Act 1903	No. 15 of 1903	31 December 1903
An Act to amend the Law relating to the Insane.

=== Private acts ===
Short title, or popular name	Citation	Royal assent
Long title
Fremantle Municipal Tramways and Electric Lighting Act 1903	Private Act of 1903	7 January 1904
An Act to empower the Municipalities of Fremantle and East Fremantle jointly to construct, maintain, and work Tramways within the boundaries of the said Municipalities, and to construct and maintain works for the Generation and Supply of Electricity for motive and lighting purposes within the same districts.

== Sources ==
- "legislation.wa.gov.au".
