= Danny Pope =

Daniel Geziano Pope (born 11 February 1960, of English and Italian heritage) is a bespoke photographic printer and restorer. Pope has printed works for photographers such as Andrew Catlin, David Hiscock, Linda McCartney, Gian Paolo Barbieri, Calum Colvin, Tim Page, Corinne Day, Ian McKell, Brian Aris, Eve Arnold, The Douglas Brothers, Terry O’Neil, David Bailey, Barry Lategan and Terence Donovan.

Panorama Magazine called Pope the "Master of Polopan Printing". Pope was the first color printer to win the Ilford Printer of the Year Award in 1993.

== Early life and career ==
Pope completed Foundation Studies in Fine Art at Falmouth School of Art in 1980, where he practiced painting in a photo realist style. Following that, Pope worked on a Manpower Services Project, painting murals on canvas for a hospice in the East End. Working from transparencies taken locally in the East End, It was here that Pope taught himself how to make Cibrachrome prints from the slides as reference material to paint from.

In 1983, Pope launched Matchless Prints Ltd in Clerkenwell Road, London, following the support of Terry Donovan, who encouraged him to go into business, despite his lack of formal training, and disregarding the fact he was only 23. Early on he worked for clients such as Roger Charity, Mark LeBon and Eamon McCabe, producing creative prints that utilized different filtrations to the norm.

Pope is credited with being the first printer to use the technique of “painting with light” on black and white Polapan transparencies to produce complex color prints. Matchless Prints moved to Bloomsbury in 1990 and in 2001 Pope opened another Matchless Prints studio in Milan. In 2006 Pope opened Steidlville London, the first showcase bookstore for publisher, Steidl.

With the advent of digital technology, now Pope translates the skills of traditional wet printing within the digital domain.

== Articles ==
- Seeing in the Dark The British Journal of Photography, 13 March 1987
- Dark Secrets Creative Review April 1989
- Prints Charming, Panorama, September 1991
- Printz of Darkness Practical Photography October 1992
- Swimming against the Tide Professional Photographer, December 1995
- Darkroom Confidential The British Journal of Photography February 2006

== Exhibitions and Book Launches (Printing Credits) ==
Type	Title	Date	Note
Exhibition	Linda McCartney's Sixties: Portrait of an Era	September 1992	Book was launched with the exhibition. Color prints (cibachrome) printed. (Pete Trew did the black and white prints)
Exhibition	Live Aid		Exhibition of Cibachromes to launch the book from the event. Sponsored by Ilford.
Exhibition	Eve Arnold	July 1993	Retrospective. Cibachrome Prints. London and traveled to New York. She launched her book, "Inretrospect"
Exhibition	Gian Paolo Barbieri	September 2007	Retrospective Palazzo Reale Milano and launch of book, Gian Paolo Barbieri published by Motta
Exhibition	Paul Smith	22 April 2008	All prints ink on Hahnemuhle paper.
Exhibition	David Hiscock "Transmutations" 15 October 2008 (at Paul Smith)	15 October 2008	Monoprint on Hahnemuhle paper
Book	David Bailey 'Havana'	2006	Printed all the color images for the book by hand on 'C' type paper. published by Steidl
Exhibition	Elk – 20 years of unseen images Soho	29 September 2007	
Exhibition	They're not laughing now	October 2010	Andrew Catlin, Matrix. Fish Gallery, Hastings
Print donations	Michael Stipe, photographer Andrew Catlin		Berlin Art Museum. Monoprint on Hahnemuhle paper.
Print donations	Vivienne Westwood	1991	Photographer Gian Paolo Barbieri. National Portrait Gallery. Monoprint on Hahnemuhle paper.

== Awards and honours ==
=== Ilford Photographic Awards ===
- Award Ilfochrome Printer of the Year, 1992
- Highly Commended Advertising and Fashion Colour, 1992
- Highly Commended Advertising and fashion colour, 1992
- Award Advertising and Fashion Colour. 1993
- Award Industrial and Commercial, 1993
- Highly Commended Electronic Imaging, 1993
- Title and Trophy Ilfochrome Printer of the Year, 1993

=== The British Picture Editors Awards ===
- Colour print award 1993
- Colour print award 1994
