= List of acts of the Parliament of Western Australia from 1905 =

This is a list of acts of the Parliament of Western Australia for the year 1905.

== 1905 ==
| Short title, or popular name | Citation | Royal assent |
Long title
| | No. 1 of 1905 | 20 July 1905 |
An Act to apply out of the Consolidated Revenue Fund and from Moneys to Credit of the General Loan Fund the sum of Six Hundred and Forty-eight Thousand Six Hundred and Twenty-eight Pounds to the Service of the Year ending 30th June, 1906.
| | No. 2 of 1905 | 6 September 1905 |
An Act to apply out of the Consolidated Revenue Fund the sum of Four Hundred and Ninety-one Thousand Three Hundred and Seventy-five Pounds to the Service of the Year ending 30th June, 1906.
| Perth Mint Amendment Act 1905 | No. 3 of 1905 | 14 December 1905 |
An Act to further amend the Perth Mint Act, 1895. (Note: Perth Mint Act 1895 (59 Vict. No. 12))
| Broome Reserve Act 1905 | No. 4 of 1905 | |
| Metropolitan Water Works Amendment Act 1905 | No. 5 of 1905 | |
| Public Education Amendment Act 1905 | No. 6 of 1905 | |
| Electric Lighting Amendment Act 1905 | No. 7 of 1905 | |
| Agricultural Bank Act Amendment Act 1905 | No. 8 of 1905 | |
| Reserves Act 1905 | No. 9 of 1905 | |
| Fertilisers and Feeding Stuffs Amendment Act 1905 | No. 10 of 1905 | |
| | No. X of 1905 | |
| Stamp Act Amendment Act 1905 | No. 20 of 1905 | |
| Wines, Beer, and Spirit Sale Amendment Act 1905 | No. 21 of 1905 | |
| Land Act Amendment Act 1905 | No. 22 of 1905 | |
| Fire Brigades Act 1905 | No. 23 of 1905 | |
| | No. 24 of 1905 | |
| Metropolitan Waterworks Amendment Act 1905 (No. 2) | No. 25 of 1905 | |
| Wagin–Dumbleyung Railway Act 1905 | No. 26 of 1905 | 23 December 1905 |
An Act to authorise the Construction of a Railway from Wagin to Dumbleyung.
| Goomalling–Dowerin Railway Act 1905 | No. 27 of 1905 | 23 December 1905 |
An Act to authorise the Construction of a Railway from Goomalling to Dowerin.
| Katanning–Kojonup Railway Act 1905 | No. 28 of 1905 | 23 December 1905 |
An Act to authorise the construction of a Railway from Katanning to Kojonup.
| | No. 29 of 1905 | 23 December 1905 |
An Act to apply a sum out of the Consolidated Revenue Fund and from Moneys to Credit of the General Loan Fund and from the Loan Suspense Account to the Services of the Year ending thirtieth day of June, One thousand nine hundred and six, and to appropriate the Supplies granted in this Session of Parliament.

== Sources ==
- "legislation.wa.gov.au".
