= Bolgart, Western Australia =

Bolgart
- Town
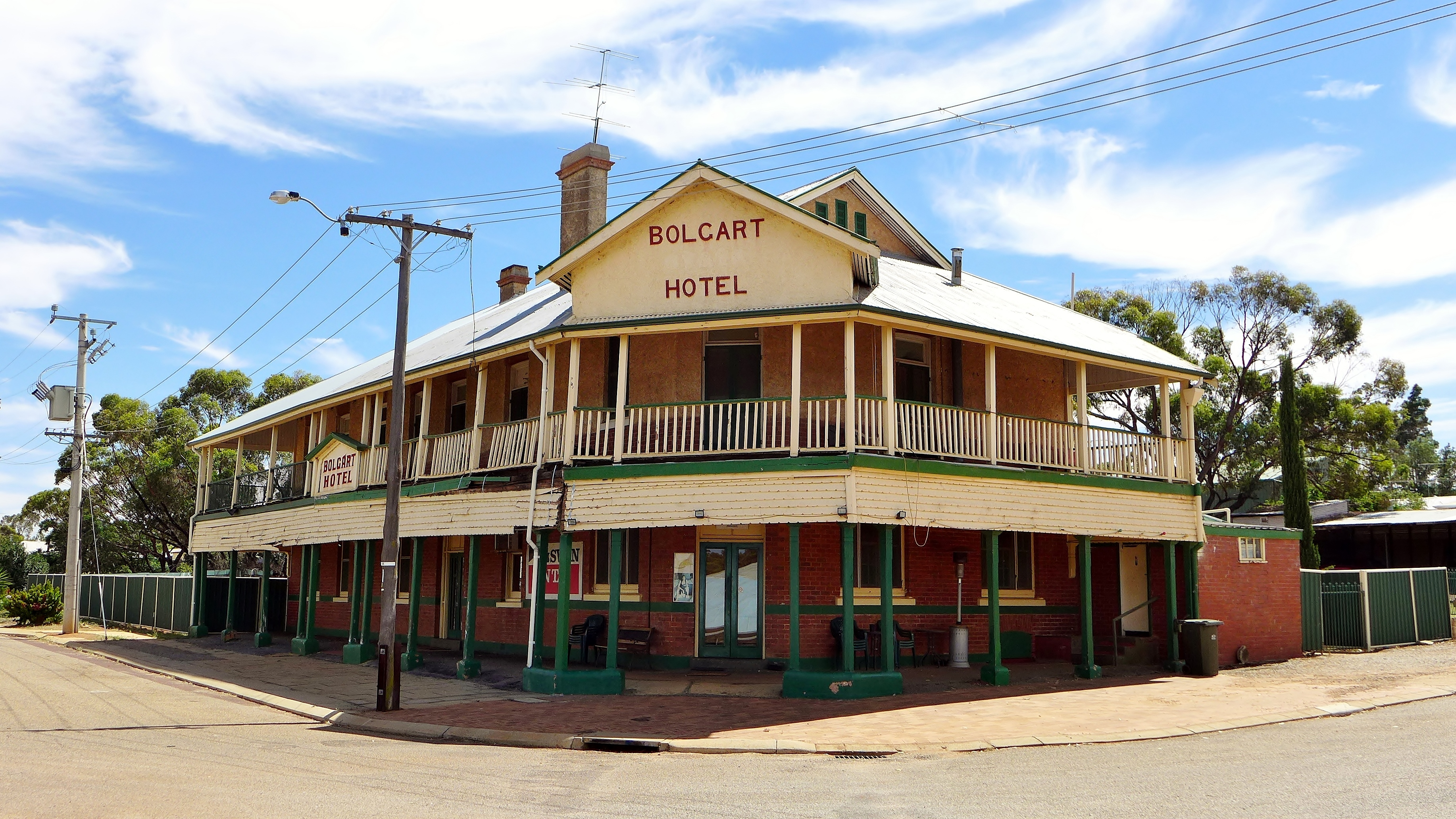
- Bolgart Hotel, 2014

- Interactive map of Bolgart
- Coordinates: 31.274°S 116.511°E
- Country: Australia
- State: Western Australia
- LGA: Shire of Victoria Plains
- Location: 116 km (72 mi) NE of Perth; 31 km (19 mi) WNW of Goomalling
- Established: 1909

Government
  - State electorate: Moore
  - Federal division: Durack

Area
  - Total: 261 km^{2} (101 sq mi)
- Elevation: 241 m (791 ft)

Population
  - Total: 128 (SAL 2021)
- Postcode: 6568

Bolgart is a townsite north of Toodyay in Western Australia. It is in the Shire of Victoria Plains.

The town derives its name from a nearby spring. The spring was discovered and the name recorded by explorer George Fletcher Moore in 1836. The area was settled in the 1840s and one of the first settlers, J Scully, named his property Bolgart. The townsite was gazetted in 1909.

The name of the town is Aboriginal in origin and means place of water.

The town was struck by a magnitude 5.2 earthquake on 11 March 1952 followed by several aftershocks. The earthquake was felt as far away as Perth, where taller buildings were rocked.

The reserves Drummond Nature Reserve and Bewmalling Nature Reserve are west and south west of this locality. The main industry in town is wheat farming with the town being a Cooperative Bulk Handling receival site.

A railway line runs through Bolgart, which was the terminus of the Newcastle–Bolgart Railway before it was extended to Miling and became the Clackline–Miling railway.

The town also has a small agricultural museum housing a restored early twentieth century Marshall oil-fired tractor.

== Moss Rock Bell Tower ==
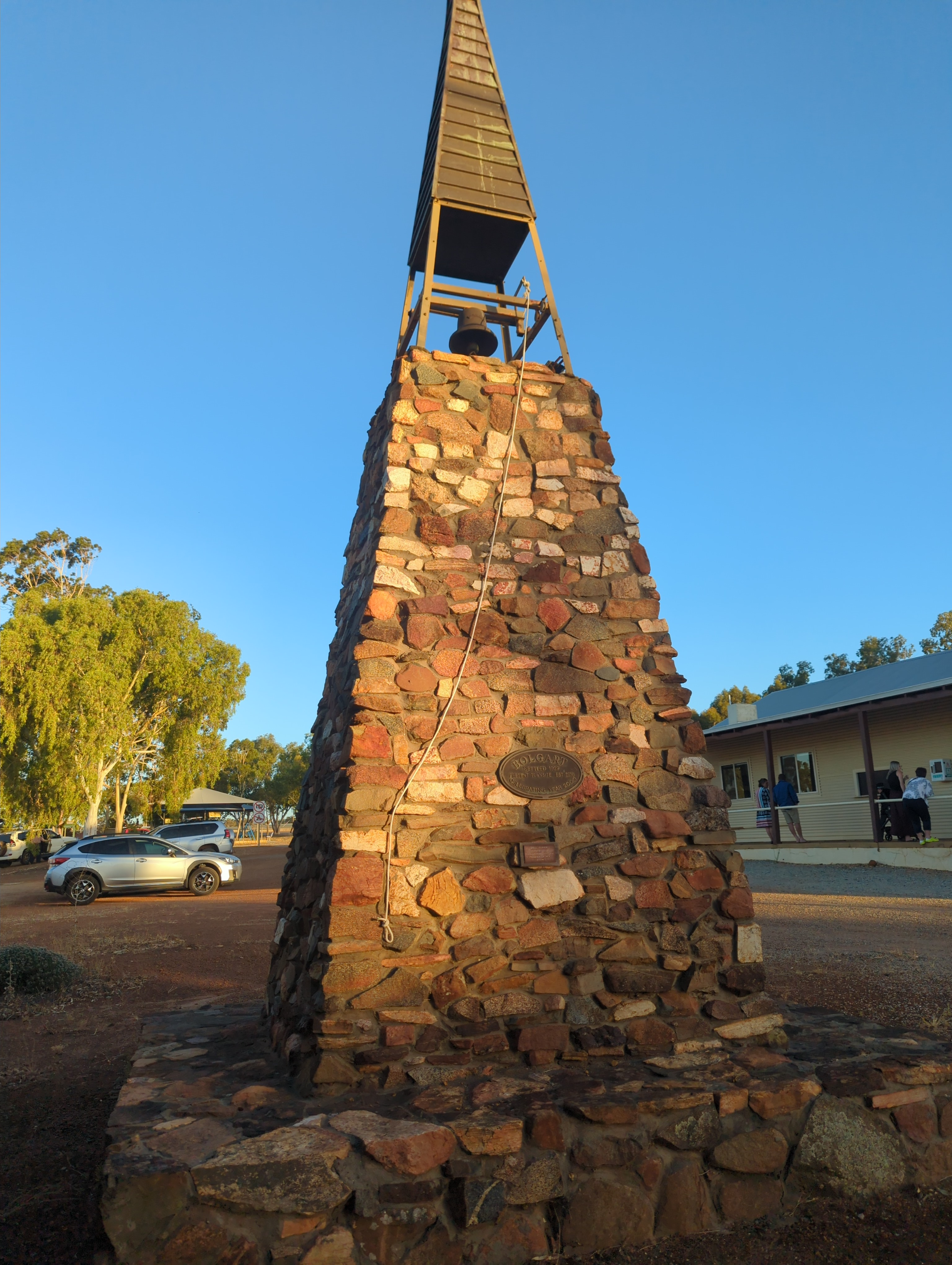
Moss Rock Bell Tower taken in 2025. The Bell still rings!

In 1999, a local resident named Doris Martin organized the construction of a bell tower. This was done in response to Liberal State Premier Richard Court's construction of the Swan Bells tower in the Perth and highlight the lack of funding for country towns. The Swan Bells Tower cost $5.5 million to construct and According to Doris "spending massive amounts of money on an (unwanted) belltower came at the expense of small rural communities desperately in need of help"

The Bolgart Bell tower was crowd funded, using no grants and only partial help from the local shire. $377 was given in private donations and another $1300 was donated from state and federal politicians, where one third of the 117 asked contributed to the project. Additionally, a $1000 bronze bell and plaque created in a Welshpool foundry was donated through a "can you help" column in The West Australian newspaper.

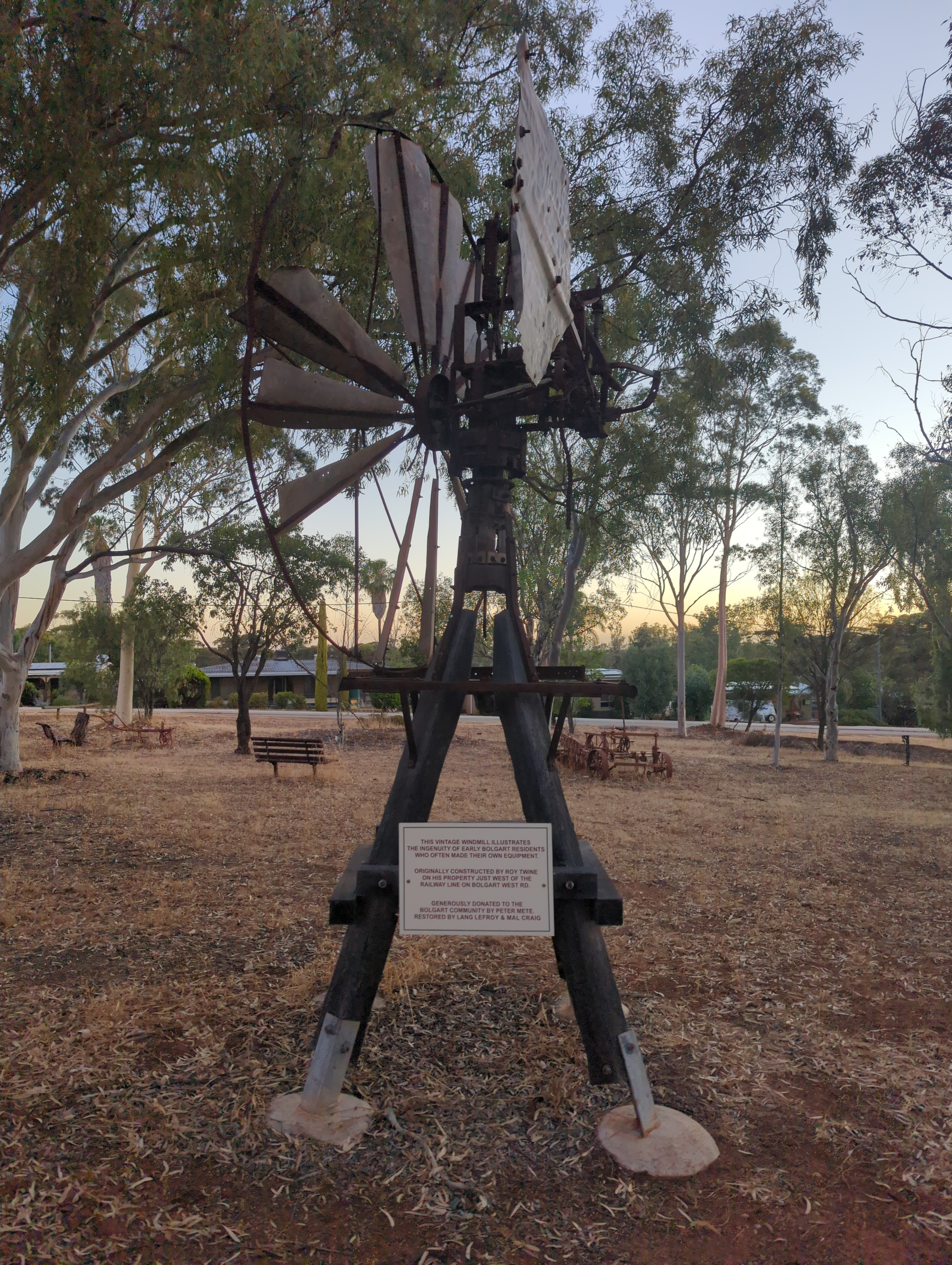
a four legged windmill in Bolgart, likely similar to the one used in constructing the Bolgart Bell Tower

Using locally donated labour and materials, construction was finished within 10 months. The tower consisted of rocks, recycled copper, and an old windmill frame. At the same time, the Swan Bells tower was just starting construction and wouldn't see completion until 10 December 2000. The still functional Bell can be rung freely with a small pulley at the base of the tower.

Premier Court reportedly conceded defeat in "the battle of the belltowers", agreeing to officially unveil the bell tower in Bolgart on 21 November 1999 where he declared the tower functional in front of hundreds of onlookers.

Doris Martin wrote a book called "The building of the Bolgart belltower" Which includes photos and diagrams of the project. Doris explained that the Bell Tower was first inspired by her brother's letter about Henry Longfellow's poem "The Bell of Atri", using the story to criticize the state government ignoring those who are unfairly treated.

== Gallery ==
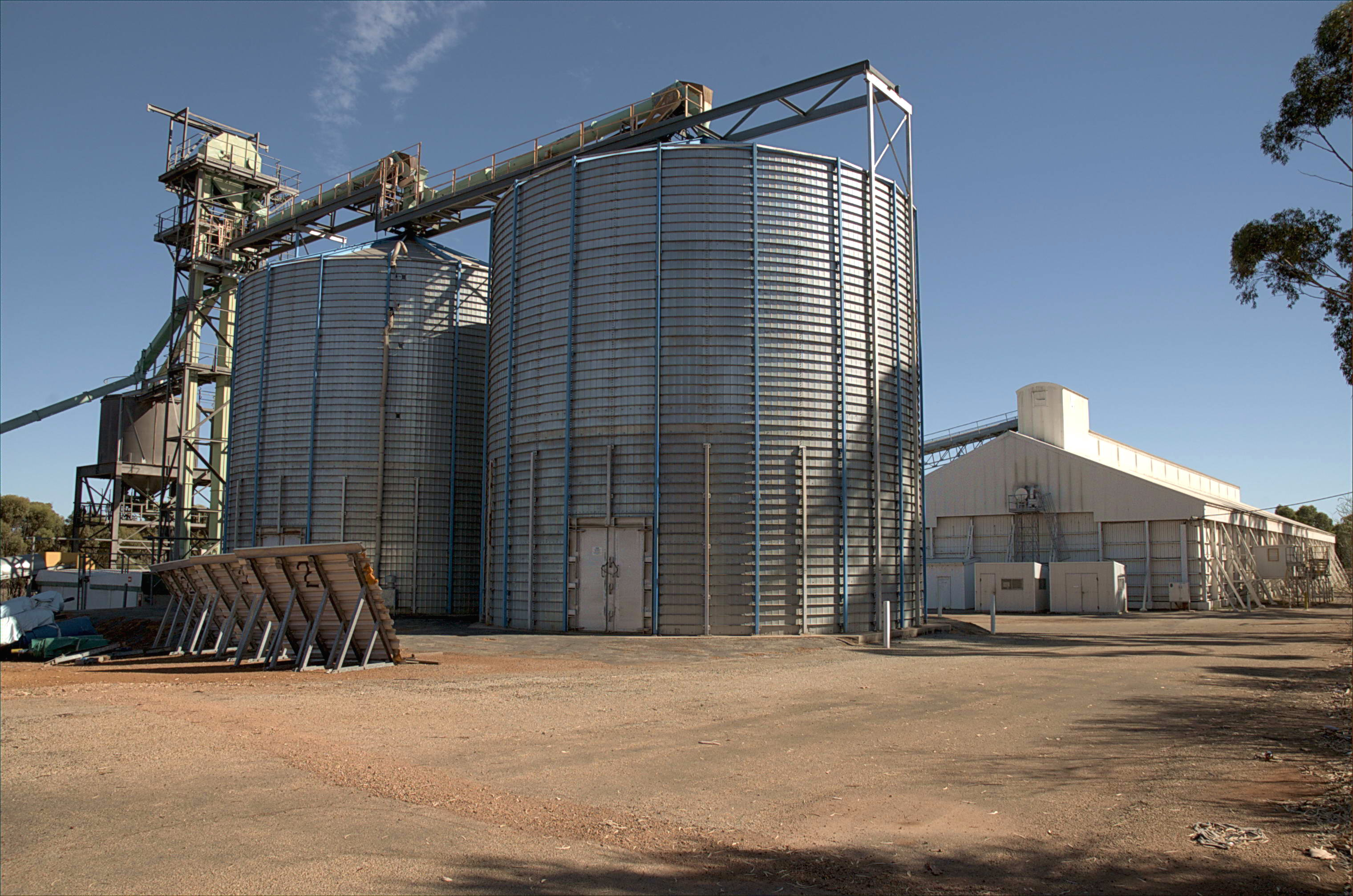
Bolgart CBH grain bins

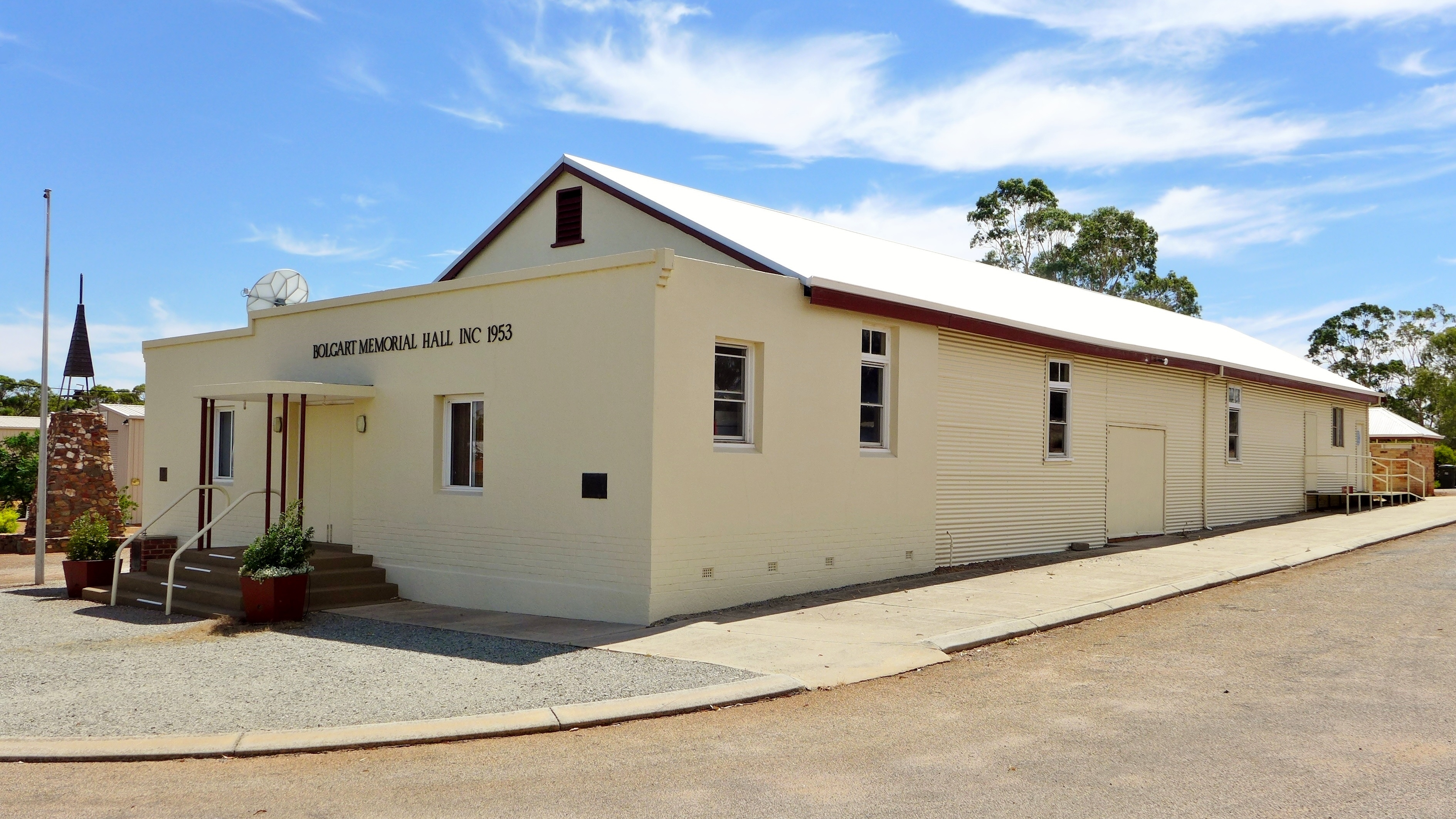
Bolgart Memorial Hall in 2014

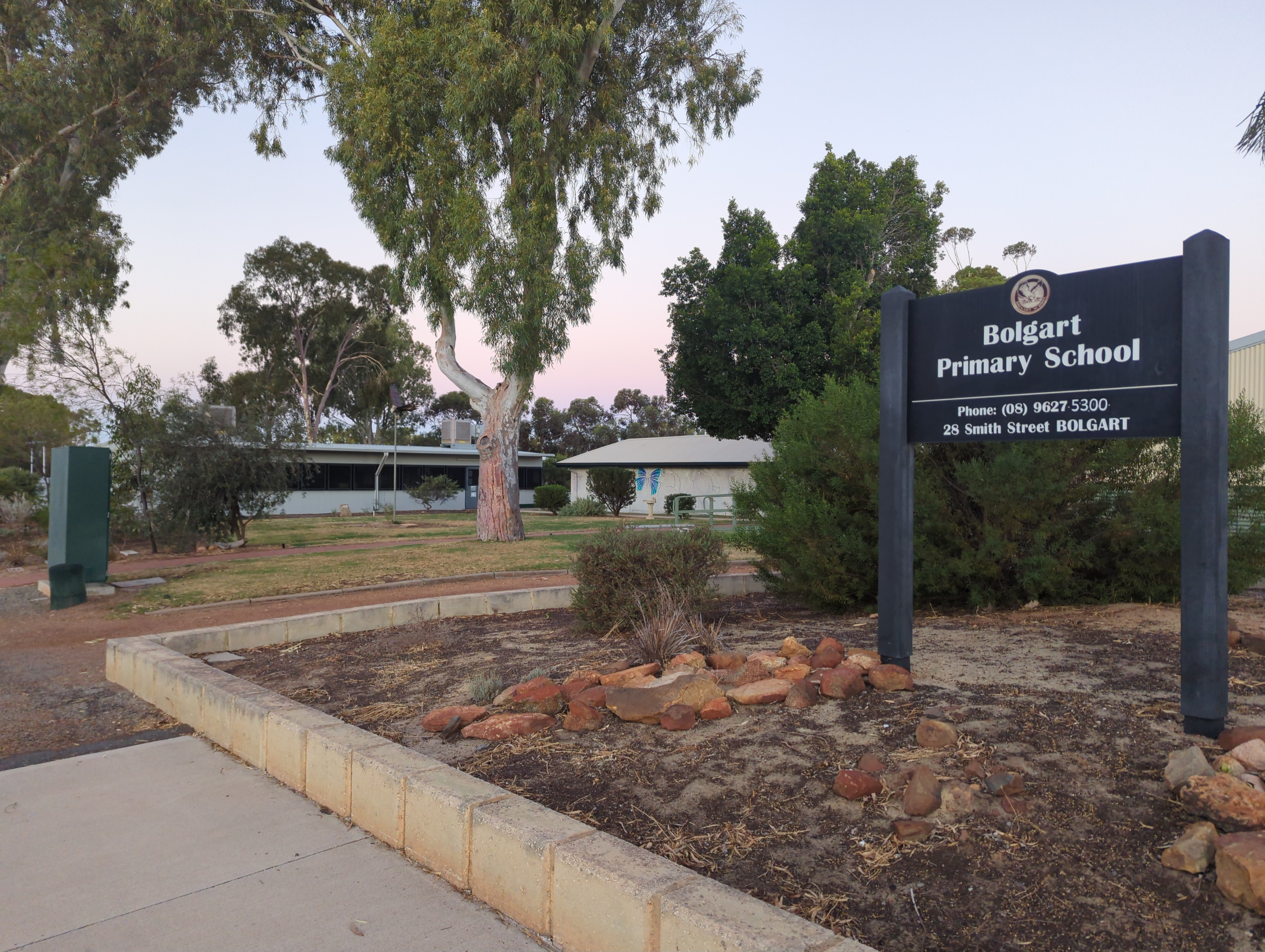
Bolgart Primary School

== See also ==
- Earthquakes in Western Australia
- South West Seismic Zone
- Media related to Bolgart, Western Australia at Wikimedia Commons
