= Linda McCartney's Sixties =

Linda McCartney's Sixties: A Portrait of an Era
- Author: Linda McCartney
- Language: English
- Genre: Photo Book
- Publisher: Bulfinch
- Publication date: October 13, 1992
- Publication place: United States
- Media type: Print (Hardback & Paperback)
- Pages: 176 pages
- ISBN: 0-8212-1959-6
- OCLC: 25632233
- Dewey Decimal: 781.66/09/046 20
- LC Class: ML87 .M4 1992

Linda McCartney's Sixties: Portrait of an Era (published on 13 October 1992) is a book by Linda McCartney which presents a number of selected photographic portraits of rock legends. Linda McCartney's Sixties: Portrait of an Era continues to be the most famous work by McCartney. The text was written from interviews with Linda by Steve Turner who would go on to write 'A Hard Day's Write: The Stories Behind Every Beatles' Song' and 'The Gospel According to the Beatles.'

Portrait of an Era is the first museum show of her work in the United States since her death in April 1998. It is a selection of 50 photographs of some of the greatest names in the world of rock music captured in black and white on exquisite platinum prints and silvertone, and in color. Among the bands and musicians portrayed are those that have become icons of late-twentieth-century popular music: Jimi Hendrix, Aretha Franklin, the Rolling Stones, the Who, Paul McCartney, John Lennon, B. B. King, Jim Morrison, Janis Joplin, Ray Charles, The Beatles, the Grateful Dead and Otis Redding.

"My big break was in June 1966 with the Rolling Stones. This was a session which came about more or less by accident, as did so many good things at that time." Linda McCartney

This is how Linda McCartney begins her book Linda McCartney's Sixties: Portrait of an Era. It was also the beginning of her photographic career, which was to span more than three decades. During that time she not only widened her view from the world of Sixties rock music to include landscapes, still lifes and portraits of everyday life as she encountered it, she also developed her technical skills, not just in taking the picture but also in developing it. Her experiments with making sun prints, a photographic developing process dating back to the early years of photography in the nineteenth century, earned her the distinction of having her work exhibited at the Royal Photographic Society in Bath, England.

The book was published in Japan as シックスティーズ : 伝說のロック・アーティスト (‘The Sixties: Legendary Rock Stars’).
