= Avon Yard to Mullewa railway line =

Railway line in Western Australia

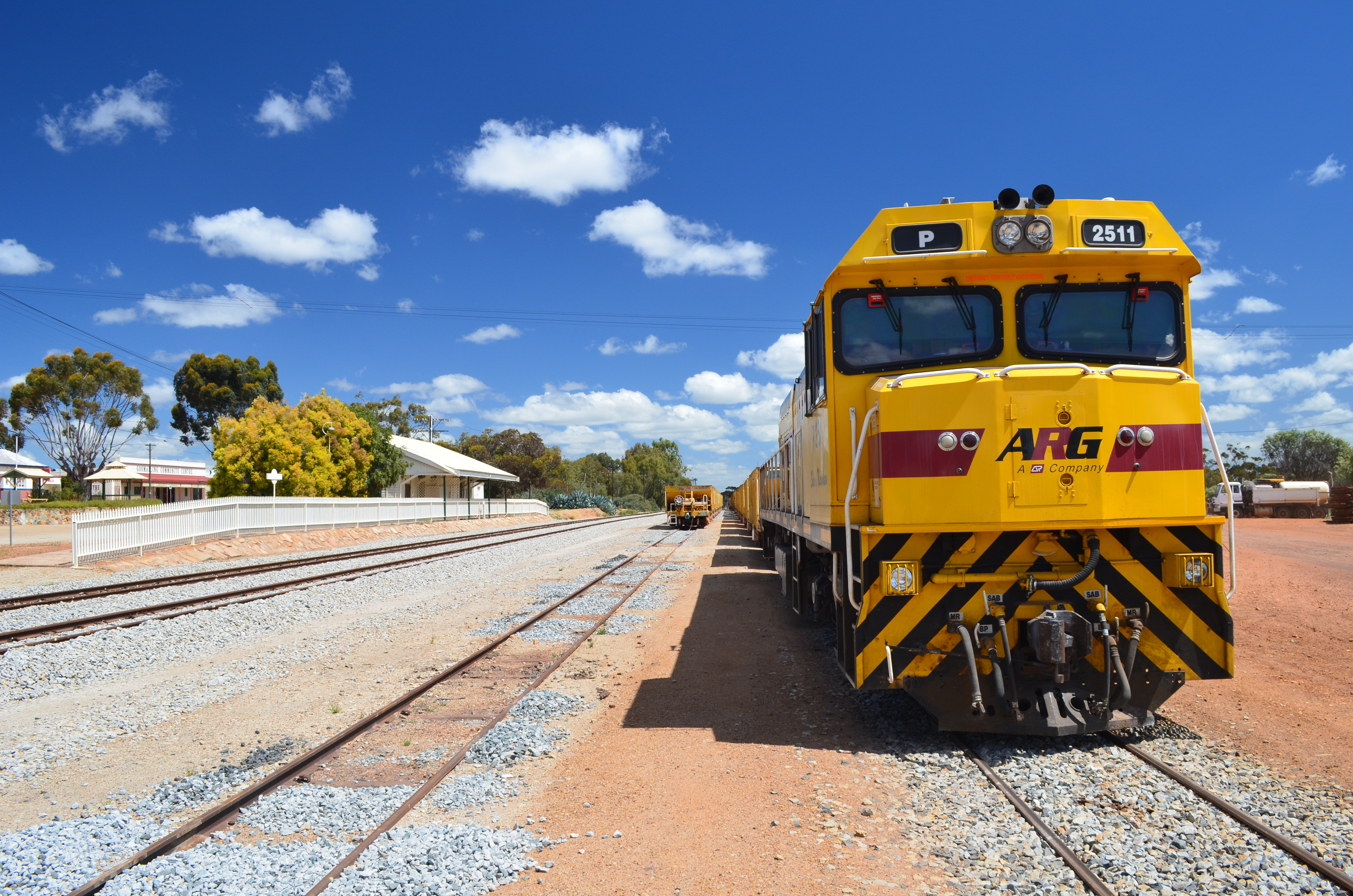
- P 2511 Shire of Narembeen passing through Goomalling

Overview
- Owner: Public Transport Authority
- Locale: Mid West and Wheatbelt, Western Australia
- Termini: Northam (Avon Yard); Mullewa

Service
- Operator(s): Arc Infrastructure

History
- Commenced: 1900
- Opened: 5 March 1915

Technical
- Line length: 429 km (267 mi)
- Track gauge: 1,067 mm (3 ft 6 in)
- Highest elevation: 355.4 m (1,166 ft)
- Avon Yard to Mullewa railway line Main locations

The Avon Yard to Mullewa railway line is a 429-kilometre (267 mi) long railway line operated by Arc Infrastructure in the Mid West and Wheatbelt regions of Western Australia, connecting the Avon Yard at Northam with Mullewa. The 104-kilometre (65 mi) section of the railway line from Perenjori to Dalwallinu is, as of 2024, not in operation, having closed in the late 1990s, while the sections north, Perenjori to Mullewa, and south, Dalwallinu to Northam, are.

At Mullewa, it connects to the Geraldton to Mullewa railway line. Historically, it also connected to the former Mullewa to Meekatharra railway line but only the 30-kilometre (19 mi) section from Mullewa to Pindar is still listed on official railway maps. At Northam, it connects to the Eastern Railway and the Eastern Goldfields Railway.

At Tilley Junction, north of Morawa, the Karara railway also connects to the line, while, at Goomalling, the Goomalling to West Merredin railway line connects to it.

== History ==
The Northam–Goomalling Railway Act 1899, an act by the Parliament of Western Australia granted assent on 16 December 1899, authorised the construction of the 55-kilometre (34 mi) long railway line from Northam to Goomalling.

The contract to construct the first section of the line, to Goomalling, was awarded to the Western Australian Public Works Department in March 1900 and the line was officially opened on 1 July 1902. The new railway line branched off in East Northam from what was then called the Yilgarn Railway, now the Eastern Goldfields Railway and became known as the Northam–Goomalling railway.

The Goomalling–Dowerin Railway Act 1905, assented to on 23 December 1905, authorised the construction of the 24-kilometre (15 mi) spur line to Dowerin, which would become the Goomalling to West Merredin railway line.

The Goomalling–Wongan Hills Railway Act 1909, assented to on 21 December 1909, authorised the construction of the second section of the railway line, 55 kilometres (34 mi) from Goomalling to Wongan Hills. The contract for the construction of this section was awarded to Atkins & Finlayson on 11 July 1910 and the line was officially opened on 22 August 1911, under the name of Goomalling–Wongan Hills Railway.

The third and final section of the railway line was authorised through the Wongan Hills–Mullewa Railway Act 1911, assented to on 16 February 1911. It authorised construction of the 319-kilometre (198 mi) section from Wongan Hills to Mullewa. The contract for this line was awarded to the Public Works Department on 22 May 1912.

The line was discussed publicly as the Wongan Hills–Mullewa Railway, and it was officially opened on 5 March 1915. Considerable public discussion of the parallel route to the Midland railway ensued.

In 1923, the Yarramony–Eastward Railway Act 1923, assented to on 22 December, authorised the construction of a 137-kilometre (85 mi) spur line to the east of Yarramony from the Northam to Goomalling section of the railway line. The Yarramony spur was surveyed but never constructed.

In 1929, a connection between Miling the terminus of the Clackline-Miling railway and Pithara on the Avon Yard to Mullewa railway line was being considered.

Arc Infrastructure deems the railway line to be part of its Grain Freight Rail Network, which, in 2017, accounted for 50 percent of its network but only 10 percent of its freight. The line from Northam to Goomalling was classified as Tier 1, as was the Mullewa to Perenjori section. The Goomalling to McLevie section was classified as Tier 2 while the Perenjori to Latham section was deemed to be Tier 3, with Latham to McLevie not assessed. The Geraldton to Perenjori section, titled the Geraldton Backline, apart from grain, also carried a large amount of iron ore.

As of 2024, the railway line is shown as operational on the 135-kilometre (84 mi) section from Mullewa to Perenjori. The 104-kilometre (65 mi) section from Perenjori to Dalwallinu is shown as not in use while, from Dalwallinu to the Avon Yard, the 190-kilometre (120 mi) section is active again. The Perenjori to Dalwallinu section was closed in the late 1990s as the line would have needed an upgrade to be able to accommodate the increase in heavy haulage. A reopening of the section was discussed to provide a direct access for the local farming and mining industries to Geraldton port. In 2021, it was estimated that it would cost A$77.59 million to upgrade the Perenjori to Maya section of the railway line to reopen it.

== Elevation ==
The railway line starts at an elevation of 152.07 metres (498.9 ft) at the Avon Yard and finishes at Mullewa at an elevation of 279.63 metres (917.4 ft). It reaches its lowest point of 149.54 metres (490.6 ft) at 5.2 kilometres (3.2 mi) from Northam and its highest point of 355.4 metres (1,166 ft) at 374.7 kilometres (232.8 mi), between Canna and Leda.

== Heritage ==
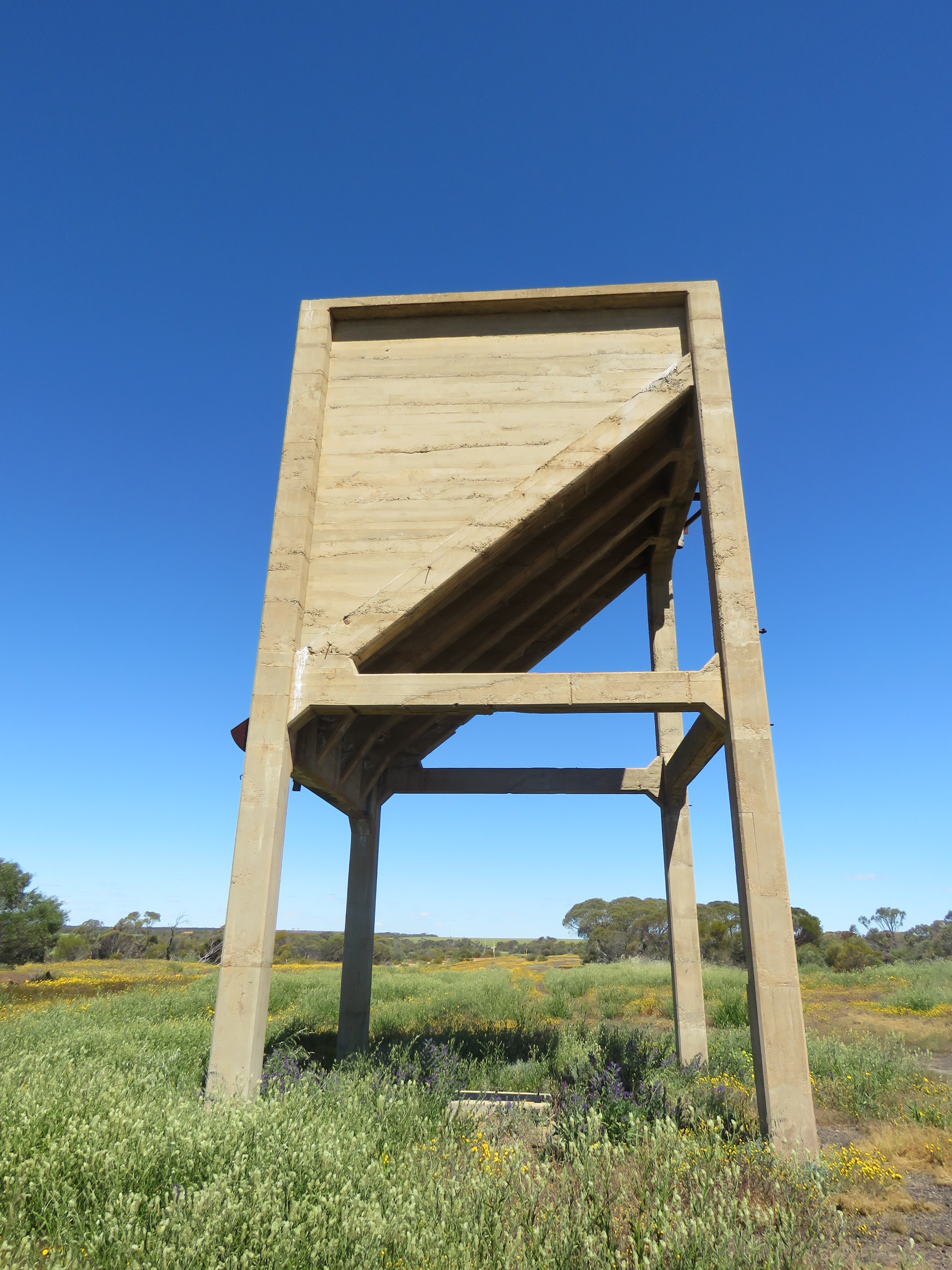
The state heritage listed Caron coal stage

A number of buildings associated with the railway line are listed on the Western Australian State Register of Heritage Places. The Mullewa railway station with its goods shed and water tank are state heritage listed.

In the Shire of Perenjori, the Caron coal stage, dating from 1930, is also state heritage listed. The Caron coal stage is the only coal stage in Western Australia to be built from concrete. During the steam age of the railway line, Caron was a major hub because of its reliable water supply, which made it an important watering point on the line. Apart from the coal stage it also has a still existing railway dam and had an engine turntable, railway barracks and four railway cottages, but nothing remains of these installations. Caron was also where train crews changed over and, from 1936, it had a refreshment room and bar for the crews, but these were destroyed by fire in 1949. With the change from steam to diesel engines in 1957, Caron's importance greatly declined.

The railway track and railway house at Buntine, the Dalwallinu railway station, the railway track and station at Kalannie and the Wubin railway station are on the Shire of Dalwallinu's heritage list.

In the Shire of Wongan-Ballidu, the Railway Barracks, the Station Master's House and the railway house in Wongan Hills are state heritage listed. Additionally, the Ballidu railway precinct and the Cadoux railway siding are on the shire's heritage list.

The Goomalling railway station siding building is on the Shire of Goomalling's heritage list.

In the Shire of Northam, the Northam railway station and the Railway Institute are both state heritage listed but predate the railway line to Mullewa.
