= Bulfinch =

Bulfinch is an Irish American surname. Notable people with the surname include:

- Charles Bulfinch (1763–1830), American architect
- Thomas Bulfinch (1796–1867), American writer best known as author of Bulfinch's Mythology

== See also ==
- Bullfinch (disambiguation)
