= Wyalkatchem to Southern Cross railway line =

Partially operating railway line in Western Australia

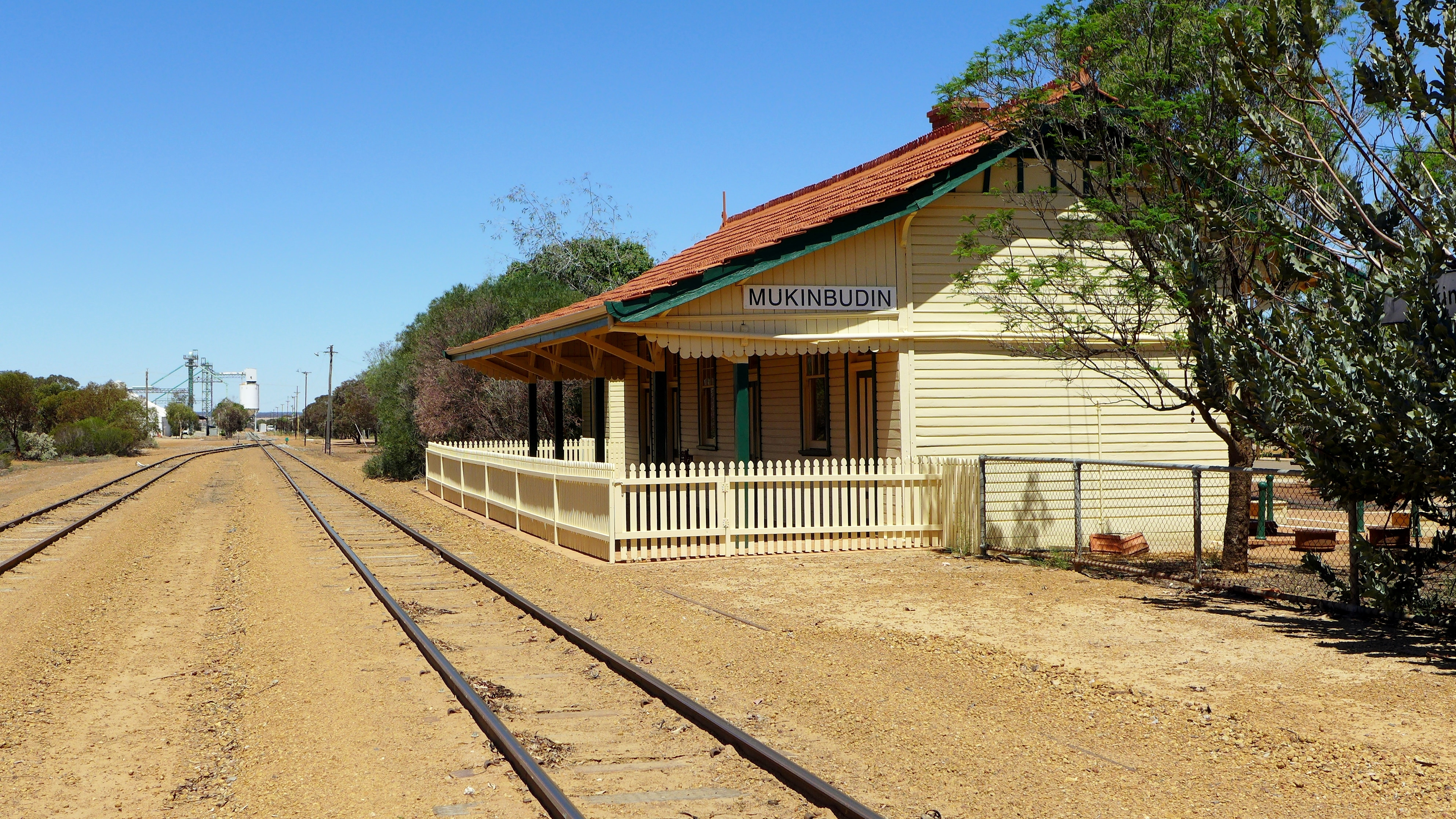
- The heritage listed Mukinbudin railway station

Overview
- Owner: Public Transport Authority
- Locale: Wheatbelt, Western Australia
- Termini: Wyalkatchem; Southern Cross (former) Mukinbudin (current)

Service
- Operator(s): Arc Infrastructure

History
- Commenced: 1910
- Opened: 22 July 1929

Technical
- Line length: 253 km (157 mi)
- Track gauge: 1,067 mm (3 ft 6 in)
- Wyalkatchem to Southern Cross railway line Main locations

The Wyalkatchem to Southern Cross railway line is a partially operational railway line, operated by Arc Infrastructure, in the Wheatbelt region of Western Australia, once connecting Wyalkatchem with Southern Cross. Of the former 253-kilometre (157 mi) long railway, only the western part, the 121-kilometre (75 mi) long section from Wyalkatchem to Mukinbudin is still operational as the Wyalkatchem to Mukinbudin railway line.

At Wyalkatchem, the railway line connects to the Goomalling to West Merredin railway line, with only the Goomalling to Wyalkatchem section of this line still being operational. At Mukinbudin, the line now terminates; in the past, it extended all the way to Southern Cross, where it connected to the Eastern Goldfields Railway.

== History ==
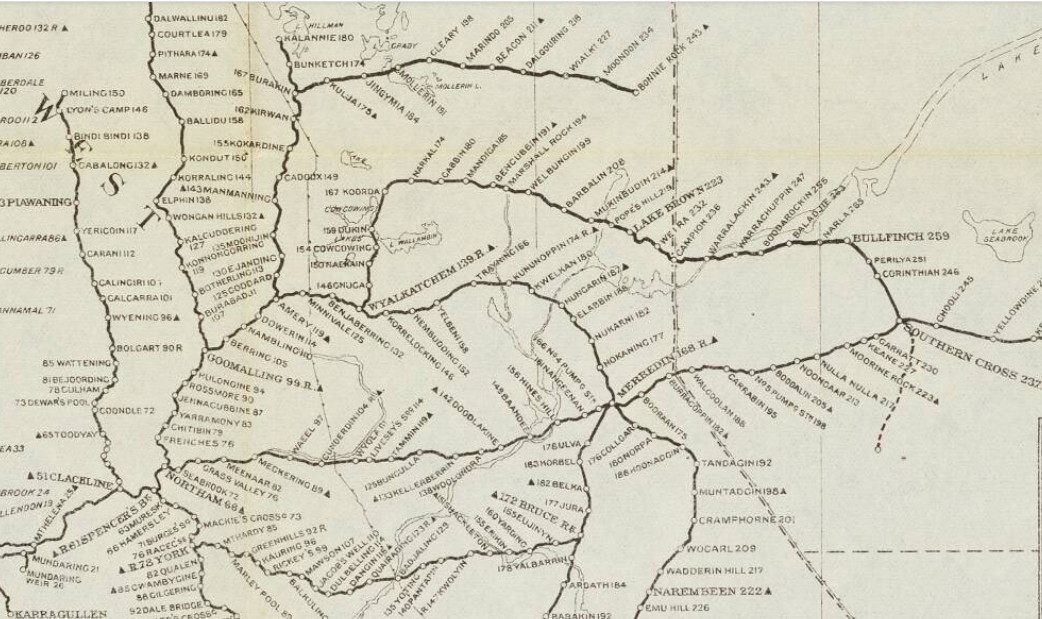
The railway lines in the Wheatbelt in 1934 (distances in miles), including the never constructed Southern Cross Southwards railway

At the eastern end of the Wyalkatchem to Southern Cross railway line, the Eastern Goldfields Railway to Southern Cross had been completed in 1894. At the western end, the Goomalling to West Merredin railway line, passing through Wyalkatchem, was constructed in two distinct stages, with the first section to Dowerin opening in 1906 and the second section, to Merredin, opening in three stages during 1911.

The Southern Cross–Bullfinch Railway Act 1910, an act by the Parliament of Western Australia granted assent on 21 December 1909, authorised the construction of the eastern end of the railway line from Southern Cross to Bullfinch, with the contract awarded to the Western Australian Public Works Department on 10 December 1910. The railway line to Bullfinch was opened on 1 December 1911. This line, from Southern Cross to Bullfinch, had been under threat of closure as early as 1922, when it was just a spur, and the closure of the Bullfinch mine made the line uneconomic. It was kept open as connecting it to the spur line at Bencubbin, also a spur line at the time, would make the line financially successful.

The Wyalcatchem–Mount Marshall Railway Act 1912, assented to on 24 December 1912, authorised the construction of the western end of railway line from Wyalcatchem to Bencubbin. The contract for the construction of this section was awarded to the Public Works Department on 18 April 1914 and the section was opened on 1 February 1917.

The Wyalcatchem–Mount Marshall Railway Extension Act 1919, assented to on 17 December 1919, authorised the construction of the extension of the railway line from Bencubbin to Mukinbudin, while the Wyalcatchem–Mount Marshall Railway (Extension No. 2) Act 1922, assented to on 13 November 1922, authorised the construction of the railway line from Mukinbudin to Lake Brown. The contract for the section from Bencubbin to Lake Brown was awarded to the Public Works Department on 11 November 1920 and it was officially opened on 15 October 1923.

The Lake Brown–Bullfinch Railway Act 1926, assented to on 16 December 1926, authorised the construction of the final section of the railway line from Lake Brown to Bullfinch. The contract for this section was awarded to the Public Works Department on 21 November 1927 and the line was officially opened on 22 July 1929.

In 1933, the Southern Cross Southwards Railway Act 1933 authorised the construction of 45 kilometres (28 mi) of railway line south of Southern Cross, which would have taken the railway into the area of Marvel Loch, which was surveyed but not constructed.

In 1954, the state government of Western Australia had compiled a list of loss-making railway operations, of which the Wyalkatchem to Bullfinch section of line was one. The report broke it into three sections, from Wyalcatchem to Mukinbudin, from Mukinbudin to Lake Brown and Lake Brown to Bullfinch. The Wyalcatchem to Mukinbudin had a total expenditure of almost four times its earnings in the financial year to June 1953, while the other two sections were considerably worse. The Mukinbudin to Lake Brown section had an expenditure of £A 4,161 versus earnings of £A 199. The Lake Brown to Bullfinch section of the Southern Cross railway line had an expenditure of £A 17,515 versus earnings of £A 425. Subsequently, the Transport Board and parliament came to the decision of closing the Muckinbudin to Bullfinch section of the line in 1957.

The Railways (Cue–Big Bell and other Railways) Discontinuance Act 1960, assented to on 12 December 1960, authorised the official closure of 13 railway lines in Western Australia, among them the Southern Cross to Mukinbudin section of the railway to Wyalcatchem.

Arc Infrastructure, the railway line's operator, deems the line to be part of its Grain Freight Rail Network, which, in 2017, accounted for 50 percent of its network but only 10 percent of its freight. The line as far as Koorda is classified as Tier 1 while the remainder, to Mukinbudin, is classified as Tier 2. In its current form and length, the line is referred to by Arc Infrastructure and the Public Transport Authority as the Wyalkatchem to Mukinbudin railway line.

== Heritage ==
In the Shire of Wyalkatchem, the Wyalkatchem railway and CBH precinct, the Wyalkatchem railway barracks and the Wyalkatchem railway station are on the Western Australian State Register of Heritage Places. Additionally, the Cowcowing, Nalkain and Gnuca railway sidings are on the shire's heritage list.

In the Shire of Mount Marshall, the railway barracks at Beacon and Bencubbin are both on the shire's heritage list, with the former being part of the Burakin to Bonnie Rock railway line while the latter belonged to the railway line to Mukinbudin.

In the Shire of Mukinbudin, the railway station and railway barracks in Mukinbudin are on the shire's heritage list.

In the Shire of Westonia, the railway house and railway water tank at Warralakin and the former Boodarockin railway station are on the shire's heritage list.
