= USS Bullfinch =

Two ships of the United States Navy have been named USS Bullfinch, after the genus of European finch.

- USS Bullfinch (AM-66), a steel-hulled trawler constructed in 1937 at Bath, Maine. Commissioned on 22 October 1940 and decommissioned 15 September 1944.
- USS Bullfinch (AM-392), a projected Admirable-class minesweeper, was laid down on 24 August 1945 but her construction was canceled on 1 November 1945.
