= Newcastle–Bolgart Railway =

Railway line in Western Australia

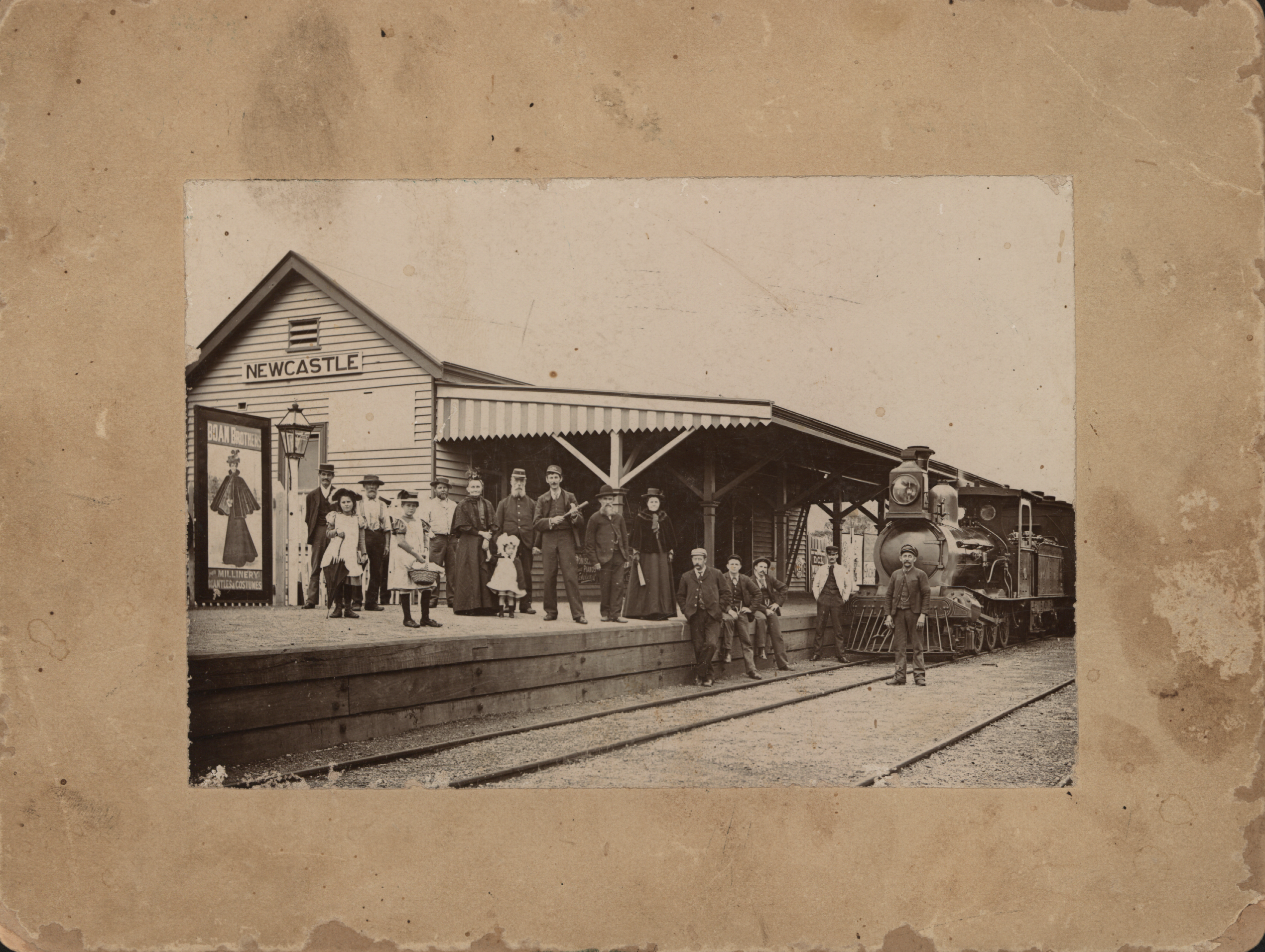
Newcastle railway station circa 1897. At this stage it was the end point of the Clackline railway.

The Newcastle–Bolgart Railway was the second stage of the Clackline–Miling railway. It was opened on 6 December 1909 by the Western Australian Premier Newton Moore. The line ran between Newcastle (now Toodyay) and Bolgart, Western Australia. The line came about after community support rallied against the Government, who were seen as not approving the rail to reduce the value of the Midland Railway Company land holdings. At a meeting on 6 November 1906 local MLA Timothy Quinlan then Speaker of the Western Australian Legislative Assembly threatened to resign from the government and join the opposition. The meeting proposed that Quinlan should meet with Moore and obtain a definitive answer as to whether he would include the line on the schedule of proposed railways.

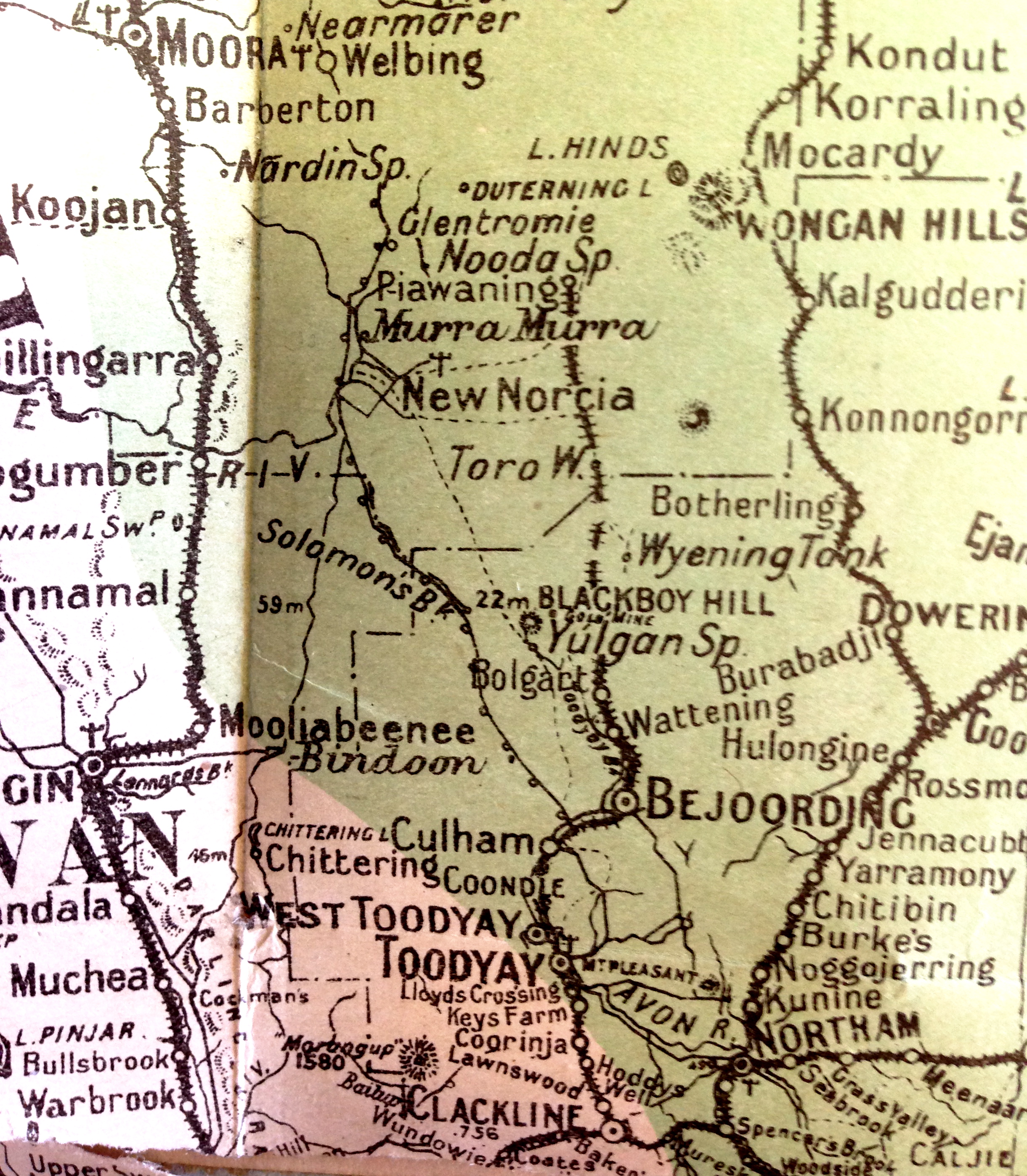
Part of the 1917 Western Australian Royal Commission into Agriculture map – showing the Clackline to Newcastle (Toodyay) then to Piawaning railway line (Bolgart is shown in smaller lettering above Bejoording) – to the left on the map the Midland Railway line, to the right the Northam to Goomalling to Mullewa railway line.

== History ==
The matter of a line between Newcastle and Bolgart was first raised in 1897. A number of state governments promised the construction of the line starting with the James Government, the line again promised by the Rason Government. The Labor Government then surveyed the line; this was followed with the Moore Government letting contracts for construction. At the sod turning ceremony Quinlan noted that the line from Clackline had not been a financial success but that opening this section would improve its fortunes.

On 20 October 1908 the tender for the construction of the line was awarded to Barry & McLaughlin as the lowest bidder at £25,744 2s. 4d. With the addition of costs for rail and fastenings the total cost was £48,000, which was £2,000 above the original estimates at the time of presenting legislation to parliament for construction; a significant portion of the tender was costs associated with bridge construction.

Construction officially commenced on 4 December 1908 when the Governor of Western Australia Frederick Bedford turned the first sod of soil during a ceremony near Newcastle. The Governor noted that this was the first time he had officiated at the construction of a railway. During his visit the Governor stated that was he glad he would not leave Western Australia without being associated in some way with the policy of agricultural railways construction for the state. As a memento of the occasion the Governor was presented with a miniature shovel that had a sandalwood handle and gold blade.

The line was opened on 6 December 1909; on 10 December 1909 a bush fire was started by sparks from a train on the line causing considerable damage despite the efforts of some 300 volunteers fighting the fire. Another fire broke out on 11 December 1909, destroying 250 acres of wheat crop owned by Quinlan.

=== Toodyay Vigilance Committee ===
Following on from the public meeting on 6 November a further meeting was held on 8 November 1906 at the Newcastle Mechanics Institute; this meeting was chaired by Mr O. Bull. The Mayor of Newcastle Father Hallinan moved that the Toodyay Vigilance Committee be formed to watch carefully all matters related to the Newcastle–Bolgart Railway and to keep their claims before the public and the WA Parliament. The meeting was surprised to learn that the premier hadn't responded to the request from the prior meeting for him to meet with Quinlan. The meeting was also informed that the Norseman railway was on the schedule, which caused consternation given that the Norseman rail had repeatedly been refused by previous Western Australian governments and that the Bolgart line had been repeatedly promised.

Another deputation on behalf of the Vigilance Committee was received by the premier to discuss the railway construction. They advised the premier that the Midland Railway Company and other prominent large land holders had subdivided their land to put it on the market. Mr Camerer explained to the premier that as a dairy farmer from Victoria he took up land in Bolgart after being assured two years prior that the railway was being built he could not continue without the line. It was also noted that 15,000 acres were under crop within five miles of the proposed route of the railway. The premier replied that there was justification for the line and that he had already decided to bring a bill for construction of the Newcastle–Bolgart Railway.

=== Timber contract issues ===
The builders of bridges on the line, Barry & McLaughlin, had engaged Joseph Shearer, a timber cutter and teamster, to supply timber. On 31 March 1910 Shearer took action in the Supreme Court alleging that Barry & McLaughlin breached their contract by purchasing timber directly from his employees.

== See also ==
- Great Southern Railway (Western Australia) § Land development
- Midland Railway of Western Australia § Land development
