= Miling, Western Australia =

Miling
- Town
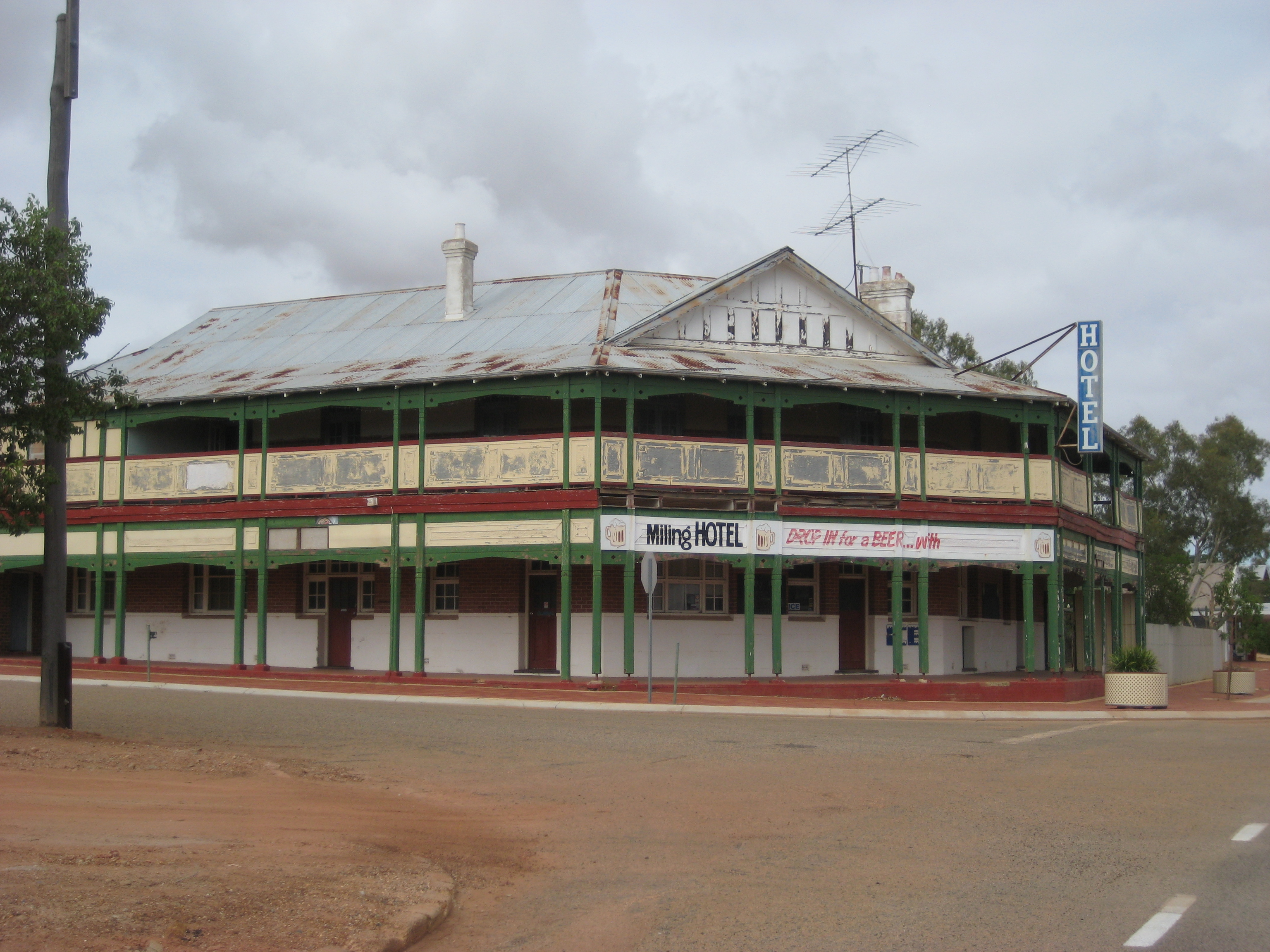
- The Miling Hotel

- Coordinates: 30°29′S 116°22′E
- Country: Australia
- State: Western Australia
- LGA(s): Shire of Moora
- Location: 200 km (120 mi) N of Perth

Government
  - State electorate(s): Moore
  - Federal division(s): Durack

Area
  - Total: 696.5 km^{2} (268.9 sq mi)

Population
  - Total(s): 101 (SAL 2021)
- Postcode: 6575

Miling is a small town in the Shire of Moora, 200 kilometres (124 mi) north of Perth, Western Australia. At the 2021 census, it had a population of 101.

Miling is the terminus of the Clackline–Miling railway branch line 150 miles from Perth. This branch line originally started at Clackline, but – after the changes to the Eastern Railway in 1966 – commenced at West Toodyay.

Miling is within the network known as the "wheatbins", which are areas served by the Wheatbelt railway lines of Western Australia.

In 1932, the Wheat Pool of Western Australia announced that the town would have two grain elevators, each fitted with an engine, installed at the railway siding.

The surrounding areas produce wheat and other cereal crops. The town is a receival site for Cooperative Bulk Handling.
