= Bullfinch, Western Australia =

Bullfinch
- Town
- Coordinates: 30°59′09″S 119°06′52″E
- Country: Australia
- State: Western Australia
- LGA(s): Shire of Yilgarn
- Location: 405 km (252 mi) east-northeast of Perth; 34 km (21 mi) northwest of Southern Cross; 97 km (60 mi) northeast of Merredin
- Established: 1910

Government
  - State electorate(s): Central Wheatbelt
  - Federal division(s): O'Connor

Area
  - Total: 1,191.5 km^{2} (460.0 sq mi)
- Elevation: 359 m (1,178 ft)

Population
  - Total(s): 29 (SAL 2021)
- Postcode: 6484

Bullfinch is a small town in the eastern Wheatbelt region of Western Australia.

The town was gazetted in 1910. Gold mining is its largest industry.

Gold was first discovered in the area in December 1909 by prospector Charley Jones. The Bullfinch No 1, 2 and 3 were the first leases claimed. The Bullfinch mine closed in 1921, but other mines opened during a boom following World War II. Bullfinch was on the Wyalkatchem to Southern Cross railway line, from 1911, and an important part of the wheatbelt rail network in subsequent years.

In 1932 the Wheat Pool of Western Australia announced that the town would have two grain elevators, each fitted with an engine, installed at the railway siding on the Wyalkatchem to Southern Cross railway line.
