= Goomalling to West Merredin railway line =

Partially operational railway line in Western Australia

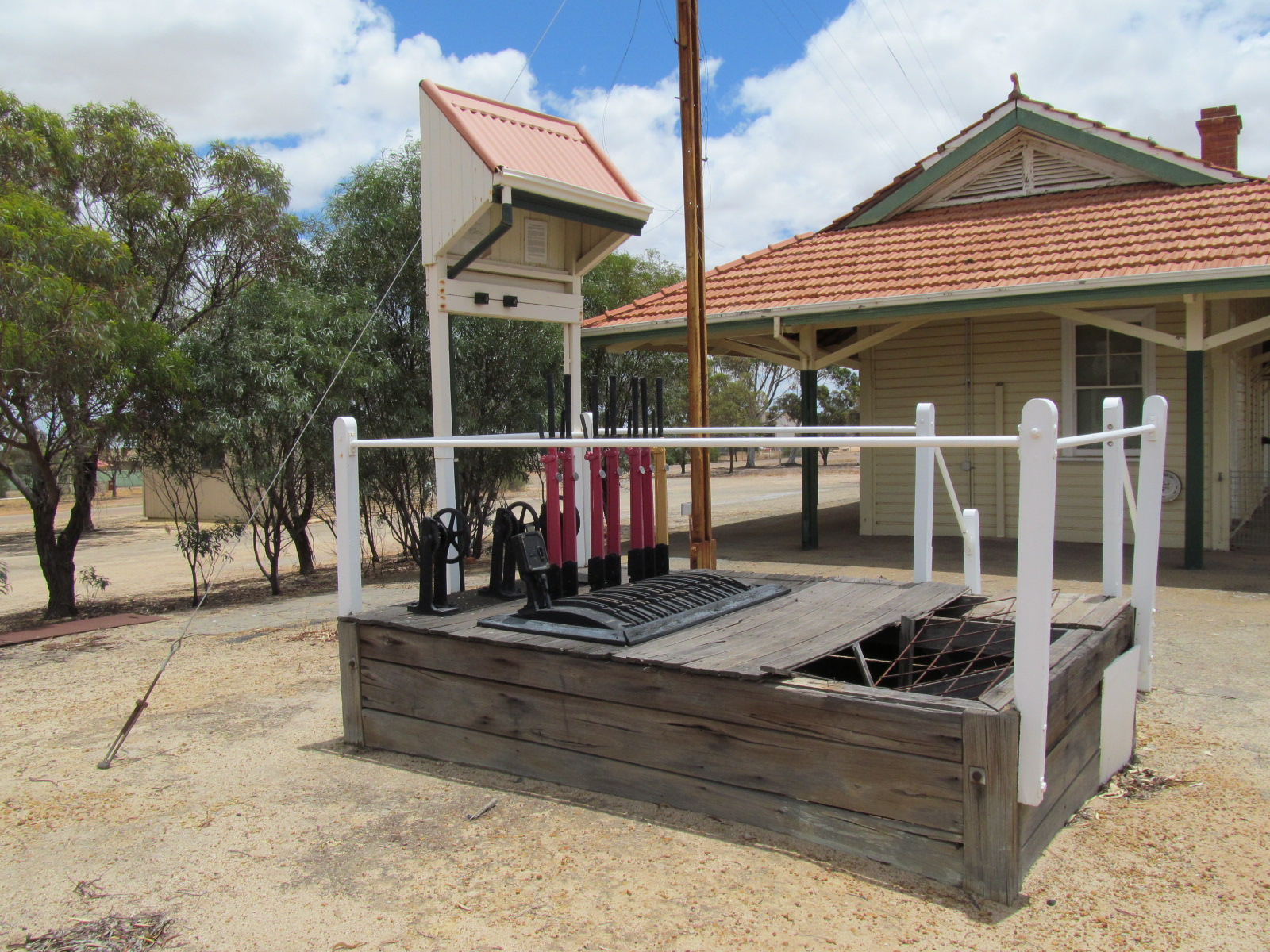
- Lever frame at the state heritage listed Wyalkatchem railway station

Overview
- Owner: Public Transport Authority
- Locale: Wheatbelt, Western Australia
- Termini: Goomalling; West Merredin

Service
- Operator: Arc Infrastructure

History
- Work began: 1906
- Opened: 28 August 1911

Technical
- Line length: 183 km (114 mi)
- Track gauge: 1,067 mm (3 ft 6 in)
- Goomalling to West Merredin railway line Main locations

The Goomalling to West Merredin railway line is a 183-kilometre (114 mi) long railway line operated by Arc Infrastructure in the Wheatbelt region of Western Australia, connecting Goomalling with West Merredin. Only the western part of the railway line, the 66-kilometre (41 mi) section from Goomalling to Wyalkatchem, is operational; the 117-kilometre (73 mi) section from Wyalkatchem to West Merredin is not in use.

At Goomalling, the railway line connects to the Avon Yard to Mullewa railway line while, at West Merredin, it connects to the Eastern Goldfields Railway. Additionally, at Amery, the Amery to Kalannie railway line branches off to the north of the Goomalling to West Merredin line while, at Wyalkatchem, the former Wyalkatchem to Southern Cross railway line branches off, but this line now only goes as far as Mukinbudin.

== History ==
=== 1899 to 1929 ===
The Northam–Goomalling Railway Act 1899, an act by the Parliament of Western Australia granted assent on 16 December 1899, authorised the construction of the 55-kilometre (34 mi) long railway line from Northam to Goomalling, which was constructed by the Western Australian Public Works Department and officially opened on 1 July 1902.

The Goomalling–Dowerin Railway Act 1905, assented to on 23 December 1905, authorised construction of the first section of the railway line from Goomalling, branching off the Northam to Goomalling railway line, to Dowerin, which became known as the Goomalling to Dowerin railway line. The contract for the construction of this line was awarded to the Public Works Department on 3 June 1906 and the railway line was officially opened on 4 December 1906.

The Dowerin–Merredin Railway Act 1909, assented to on 21 December 1909, authorised the construction of the second section of the railway line from Dowerin to Merredin. The contracts for the construction of the sections from Dowerin to Korrelocking and Korrelocking to Kununoppin were both awarded to Atkins & Finlayson on 26 April 1910 while the final section, from Kununoppin to Merredin was awarded to the Public Works Department on 22 June 1910. The three sections opened on 6 February, 19 June and 28 August 1911. In the same year, the railway line north from Goomalling was extended to Wongan Hills. The spur line from Wyalkatchem to Bencubbin on what would become the Wyalkatchem to Southern Cross railway line opened in 1917 while the Amery spur line, initially to Kulja, opened in 1929. The Wyalkatchem to Bencubbin branch line had been authorised through the Wyalcatchem-Mount Marshall Railway Act 1912 in December 1912, while the Ejanding Northwards Railway Act 1926 authorised the construction of the spur lines north of Amery, which had its name changed from Ejanding in 1928.

=== 1954 to present ===
In 1954, the state government of Western Australia had compiled a list of loss-making railway operations, of which the Wyalkatchem to Merredin section of line was one, having had a total expenditure of almost four times its earnings in the financial year to June 1953, £A 76,607 expenditure versus earnings of £A 20,787. Similarly, the Wyalkatchem to Mukinbudin section of the Southern Cross railway line was also loss-making with an expenditure of £A 79,433 versus earnings of £A 21,965.

From October 1970 to November 1971, The Kalgoorlie, a passenger service between Perth and Kalgoorlie, ran via the Goomalling to West Merredin line as the narrow gauge tracks between East Northam and West Merredin had been closed and replaced by standard gauge tracks. This service ended with the commencement of the Prospector, a standard gauge service, on 29 November 1971.

In 2013, the section of the railway line from Trayning to Merredin was closed, with a lack of government investment in the line stated as the cause by the operator. In 2021, it was estimated that it would cost A$77.6 million to upgrade the Trayning to Merredin section of the railway line to reopen it. The Wyalkatchem to Trayning section was not covered in this assessment.

Arc Infrastructure deems the railway line from Goomalling to West Merredin to be part of its Grain Freight Rail Network, which, in 2017, accounted for 50 percent of its network but only 10 percent of its freight. The line from Goomalling to Wyalkatchem and on to Korda was classified as Tier 1 while the Trayning to Merredin line was classified as Tier 3.

== Heritage ==
At the eastern terminus, at Merredin, four entries related to the railways are on the Western Australian State Register of Heritage Places: the Merredin Railway Station, the Railway Water Tank, the Railway Dam and the Railway Housing Precinct.

In the Shire of Wyalkatchem, the Wyalkatchem railway and CBH precinct, the Wyalkatchem railway barracks and the Wyalkatchem railway station are on the State Register of Heritage Places. Additionally, the Cowcowing, Nalkain and Gnuca railway sidings are on the shire's heritage list, as are the Benjaberring and Nembudding sidings; the former three are on the spur line while only the latter two are on the main line.

At the western terminus, at Goomalling, the railway station siding building is on the Shire of Goomalling's heritage list.
