= Miling railway line =

Railway line in Western Australia

The Clackline to Miling railway branch, originally known as the Clackline to Newcastle railway line, is a railway line in Western Australia.

The line developed progressively over the years and as it did so, various sections were named differently. Each section of the line needed separate lobbying and discussion in the Western Australian Parliament to get enabling acts. The final section was approved in 1920 and completed in 1925.

After completion it became known as the Miling branch, following final expansion north to Miling, and the closing of the Clackline to Newcastle (Toodyay) section.

== Clackline to Newcastle (Toodyay) (now closed) ==
The railway line to connect Newcastle to the eastern railway was considered to be best started from Clackline, rather than Northam. The original terminus of the line in the 1890s was a platform, it was later that the second stopping place properly known as Toodyay railway station was completed after the extension to Newcastle-Bolgart Railway was completed.

Following the construction of the standard gauge railway through the Avon valley in the 1960s, the connection with Clackline was no longer needed, and was closed with other former eastern railway connections in February 1966.

It is now a heritage trail.

== Toodyay to Miling ==
In the 1960s the railway line from Toodyay to Miling was altered by the construction of the Eastern Railway through the Avon Valley, through Toodyay and a connection with Northam.

== Tier system ==
The fate of the railway has been put in question due to the separation of wheatbelt railway lines being designated into specific tiers.

== Stages of opening ==
The railway line was developed over time, the construction taking fifteen years to travel over 100 km.

- Clackline – Newcastle January 1888 23.1 km
- Newcastle – Bolgart December 1909 37.0 km
- Bolgart – Calingiri May 1917 23.2 km
- Calingiri – Piawaning June 1919 30.4 km
- Piawanning – Miling August 1925 43.8 km

== Stopping places ==
Names used as found in WAGR Annual reports in the 1950s

- Clackline – Newcastle line
  - Clackline
  - Lawnswood
  - Nanamoolan
  - Hoodys Well
  - Ringa
  - Key Farm
  - Lloyds crossing
  - Newcastle / Toodyay
- Newcastle – Bolgart line
  - Lunns landing
  - Coondle
  - Dewars Pool
  - Culham
  - Bejoording
  - Wattening
  - Bolgart
- Bolgart – Miling line
  - Wyening
  - Calcarra
  - Calingiri
  - Carani
  - Yerecoin
  - Piawaning
  - Gabalong
  - Bindi Bindi
  - Lyons Camp
  - Miling

== 2019 derailments ==
The line has had derailments in 2019.
