= Goomalling, Western Australia =

Goomalling
- Town
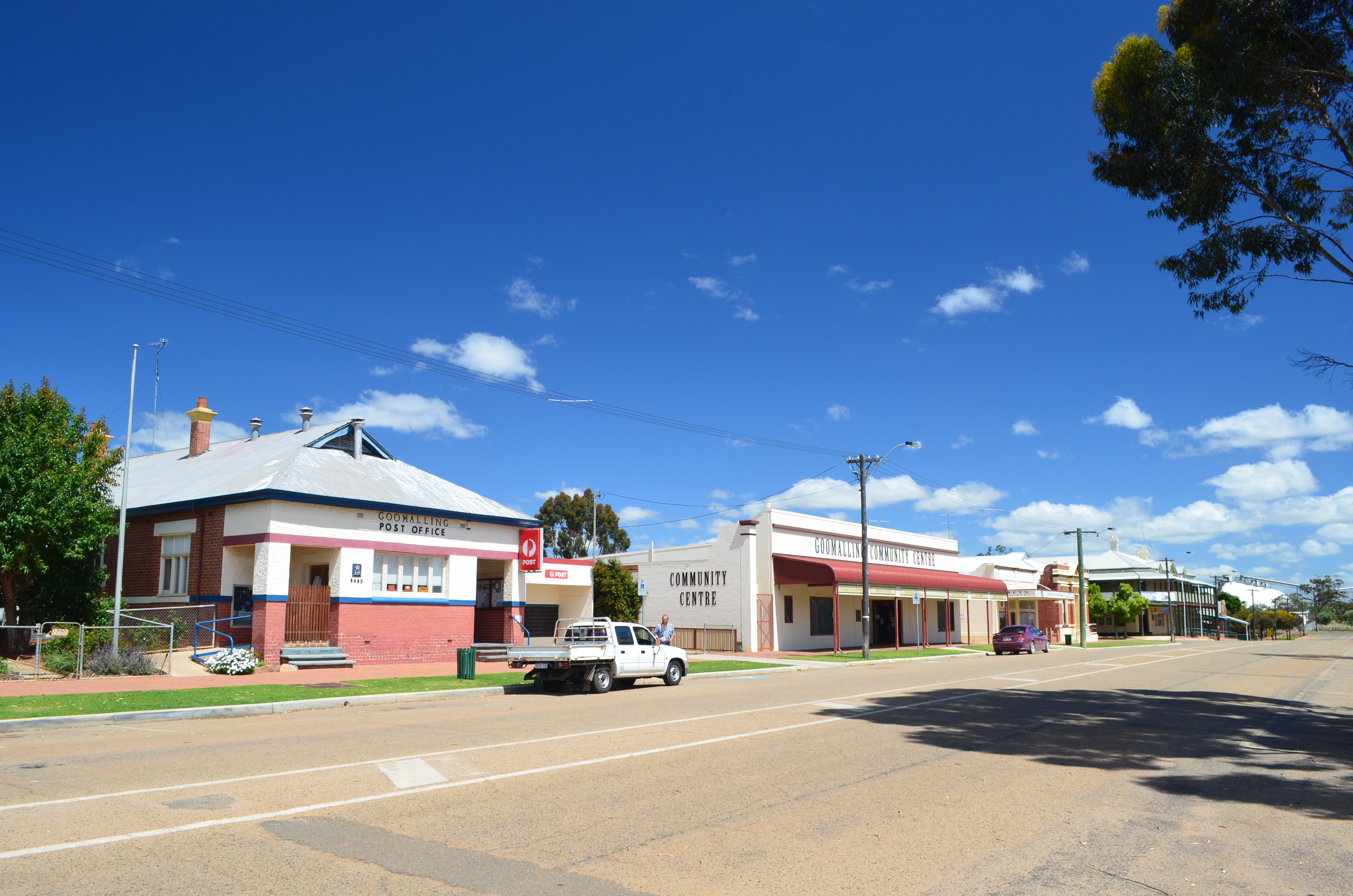
- View of Railway Terrace, 2013

- Interactive map of Goomalling
- Coordinates: 31.30°S 116.83°E
- Country: Australia
- State: Western Australia
- Region: Wheatbelt
- LGA: Shire of Goomalling
- Location: 132 km (82 mi) NE of Perth; 45 km (28 mi) NNE of Northam
- Established: 1903

Government
  - State electorate: Moore
  - Federal division: Durack

Area
  - Total: 45.2 km^{2} (17.5 sq mi)
- Elevation: 239 m (784 ft)

Population
  - Total: 463 (UCL 2021)
- Postcode: 6460
- Mean max temp: 25.6 °C (78.1 °F)
- Mean min temp: 11.3 °C (52.3 °F)
- Annual rainfall: 367.6 mm (14.47 in)

Goomalling is a townsite in the Wheatbelt region of Western Australia, 45 kilometres north-north-east of Northam, Western Australia.

The surrounding areas produce wheat and other cereal crops. The town is a receival site for Cooperative Bulk Handling.

== History ==
The name Goomalling was first shown for a spring found by explorers Hillman and Lefroy in 1846. Hillman noted on his plan "rich grassy country", and squatters subsequently moved into the area. George Slater was the first in the Goomalling area, establishing a property around Goomalling Spring in the early 1850s.

The Goomalling Agricultural Hall was opened in 1898 by John Dempster MLC, who stood in for the Commissioner of Crown Lands, George Throssell, who was unable to make it to the event.

When the Northam – Goomalling railway line was opened in 1902 the government decided to establish a townsite at Goomalling. It was gazetted in 1903. Goomalling is an Aboriginal word that means "the place of the silver-grey possum". Goomal is the Noongar word for this possum. In 1906, the branch railway to Dowering opened, which eventually became the Goomalling to West Merredin railway line.

An annual motor race meeting was held each year from 1949 to 1955, using a circuit that ran anti-clockwise along Railway Terrace-Lockyer St-Quinlan St-Forrest St-Eaton St-Throssell St-Railway Terrace. The meetings featured short sprints and handicaps for cars and motorcycles, with the feature race being a 50-mile handicap for racing cars.

== Climate ==
Climate data for Goomalling (1991–2020 normals, extremes 1967–present)
Month	Jan	Feb	Mar	Apr	May	Jun	Jul	Aug	Sep	Oct	Nov	Dec	Year
Record high °C (°F)	46.5 (115.7)	46.9 (116.4)	43.0 (109.4)	40.0 (104.0)	35.0 (95.0)	27.6 (81.7)	25.8 (78.4)	29.7 (85.5)	35.4 (95.7)	40.3 (104.5)	43.0 (109.4)	45.0 (113.0)	46.9 (116.4)
Mean daily maximum °C (°F)	35.4 (95.7)	34.5 (94.1)	31.9 (89.4)	27.5 (81.5)	22.5 (72.5)	19.1 (66.4)	17.8 (64.0)	18.7 (65.7)	21.4 (70.5)	26.3 (79.3)	30.2 (86.4)	32.3 (90.1)	26.5 (79.7)
Mean daily minimum °C (°F)	16.5 (61.7)	17.4 (63.3)	15.5 (59.9)	12.6 (54.7)	9.2 (48.6)	7.5 (45.5)	6.4 (43.5)	6.3 (43.3)	6.9 (44.4)	9.3 (48.7)	12.5 (54.5)	14.6 (58.3)	11.2 (52.2)
Record low °C (°F)	8.8 (47.8)	2.8 (37.0)	5.6 (42.1)	2.8 (37.0)	0.0 (32.0)	−1.5 (29.3)	−1.2 (29.8)	−1.1 (30.0)	−0.1 (31.8)	0.0 (32.0)	2.5 (36.5)	5.5 (41.9)	−1.5 (29.3)
Average precipitation mm (inches)	22.7 (0.89)	17.0 (0.67)	22.3 (0.88)	18.1 (0.71)	41.8 (1.65)	53.3 (2.10)	63.9 (2.52)	48.8 (1.92)	31.4 (1.24)	16.7 (0.66)	15.7 (0.62)	9.2 (0.36)	362.2 (14.26)
Average precipitation days	2.8	2.7	3.6	5.3	8.7	12.3	15.6	13.6	9.9	5.2	4.5	2.9	87.1
