= List of heritage places in the Shire of Nungarin =

List of heritage places in Western Australia

The State Register of Heritage Places is maintained by the Heritage Council of Western Australia. As of 2026, 64 places are heritage-listed in the Shire of Nungarin, of which eight are on the State Register of Heritage Places.

== List ==
The Western Australian State Register of Heritage Places, as of 2026, lists the following eight state registered places within the Shire of Nungarin:

Place name	Place #	Location	Suburb or town	Co-ordinates	Built	State registered	Notes	Photo
Alice Williams Memorial Building, Nungarin	1920	44 Railway Avenue	Nungarin	31.1850°S 118.1020°E	From 1936	20 February 2009		
Mangowine Homestead	1923	Karomin Road	Nungarin	31.0471°S 118.1054°E	From 1870 to 1889	28 June 1996		
Army Vehicle Workshop (former)	3482	26 Second Avenue	Nungarin	31.1856°S 118.0971°E	1942	5 November 1999		
Baandee CWA Rest Room	15269	Karomin Road	Nungarin	31.0478°S 118.1050°E	1928	28 June 1996		
Mangowine Dam	15287	Corner Karomin & Williams Road	Nungarin	31.0514°S 118.1085°E		28 June 1996		
Mangowine Grave Sites	24590	East Side of Karomin Road	Nungarin	31.0484°S 118.1074°E		28 June 1996		
Mangowine Homestead	24495	Karomin Road	Nungarin	31.0471°S 118.1054°E	From 1870 to 1889	28 June 1996		
Nungarin Roads Board Office (former)	1919	37 First Avenue	Nungarin	31.1852°S 118.1011°E	1922	21 April 2006		
