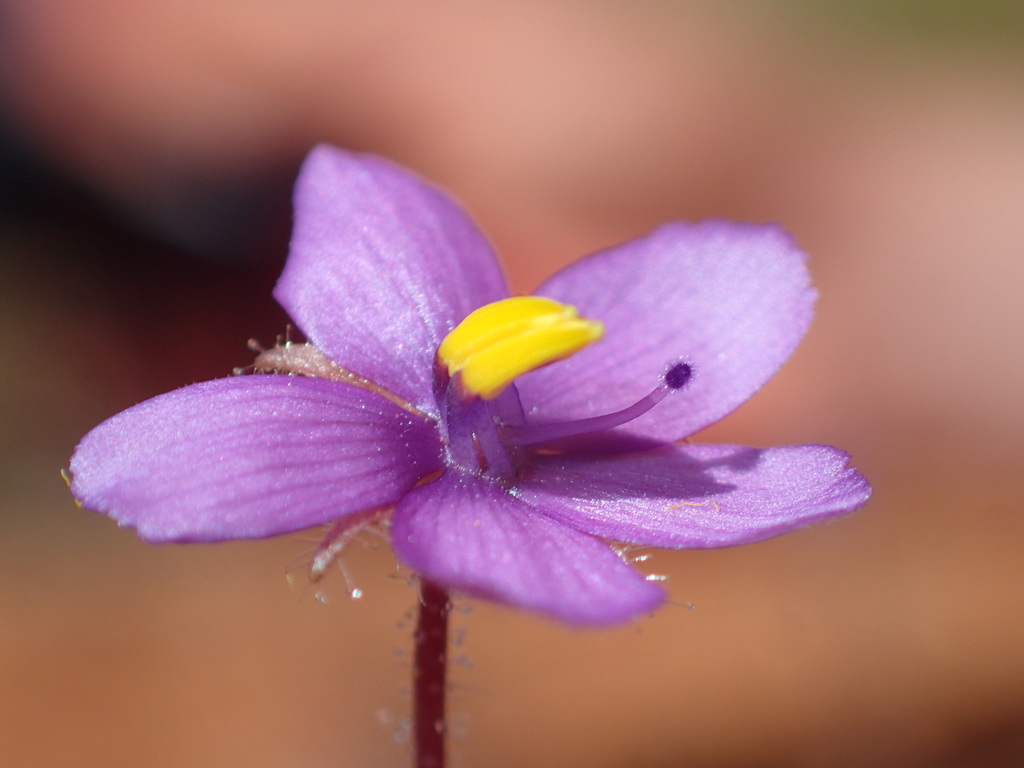

Conservation status
- Least Concern (IUCN 3.1)

Scientific classification
- Kingdom: Plantae
- Clade: Tracheophytes
- Clade: Angiosperms
- Clade: Eudicots
- Clade: Asterids
- Order: Lamiales
- Family: Byblidaceae
- Genus: Byblis
- Species: B. pilbarana

Binomial name
- Byblis pilbarana Lowrie & Conran (2013)

= Byblis pilbarana =

Species of plant

Byblis pilbarana is a carnivorous species of plant in the family Byblidaceae. It is found in Western Australia.

== Distribution and habitat ==
It lives in a semi-arid desert, and fits niches where there is enough water to survive. The north-eastern edge of the 'Red Rock' had 20–30 plants of this species on it. It was found nowhere else on the rock. The species range is around Port Hedland, in Western Australia.

== Description ==
Byblis pilbarana can be up to 15 cm tall. The blooms can be up to 1.5 across. The plant tends to stay erect, or use other plants for support. The color of the plant is bright green, but can have a red tint in harsh light. The colors of the flowers are lavender or light violet.

It is similar in appearance to Byblis filifolia and Byblis rorida.
