= Elabbin, Western Australia =

Elabbin
- Town
- Coordinates: 31.217°S 118.133°E
- Country: Australia
- State: Western Australia
- LGA(s): Shire of Nungarin
- Location: 285 km (177 mi) east of Perth; 7 km (4.3 mi) SE of Nungarin
- Established: 1913

Government
  - State electorate(s): Central Wheatbelt
  - Federal division(s): Durack

Area
  - Total: 129.3 km^{2} (49.9 sq mi)
- Elevation: 320 m (1,050 ft)

Population
  - Total(s): 22 (SAL 2021)
- Postcode: 6490

Elabbin is a small town between Merredin and Mukinbudin in the Wheatbelt region of Western Australia located in the Shire of Nungarin.

It originated as a railway siding on the Dowerin to Merredin railway line when constructed in 1912. A demand for land was created by the growth of farming in the area and the town was gazetted in 1913.

Additional agricultural land was opened to selectors in the district close to town in 1917.

The third CBH class locomotive in service for the CBH Group for grain haulage was named after this locality.
