= Jane Adams =

Jane Adams may refer to:

- Jane Kelley Adams (1852–1924), American educator
- Jane Swain Adams (1851–1934), Australian pioneer, settler, farmer and inn-keeper
- Jane Adams (actress, born 1918) (1918–2014), American performer during 1940s and early 1950s
- Jane Adams (actress, born 1965), American film, television and theatre Tony winner
- Jane Adams (camogie), Northern Irish centre field since 1997
- Jane Adams (writer) (born 1960), English novelist

== See also ==
- Jane Addams (1860–1935), American settlement worker, pacifist, and the first American female Nobel peace laureate
- Jan Adams (disambiguation)
