= Campion, Western Australia =

Abandoned town in Western Australia

Campion
- Town
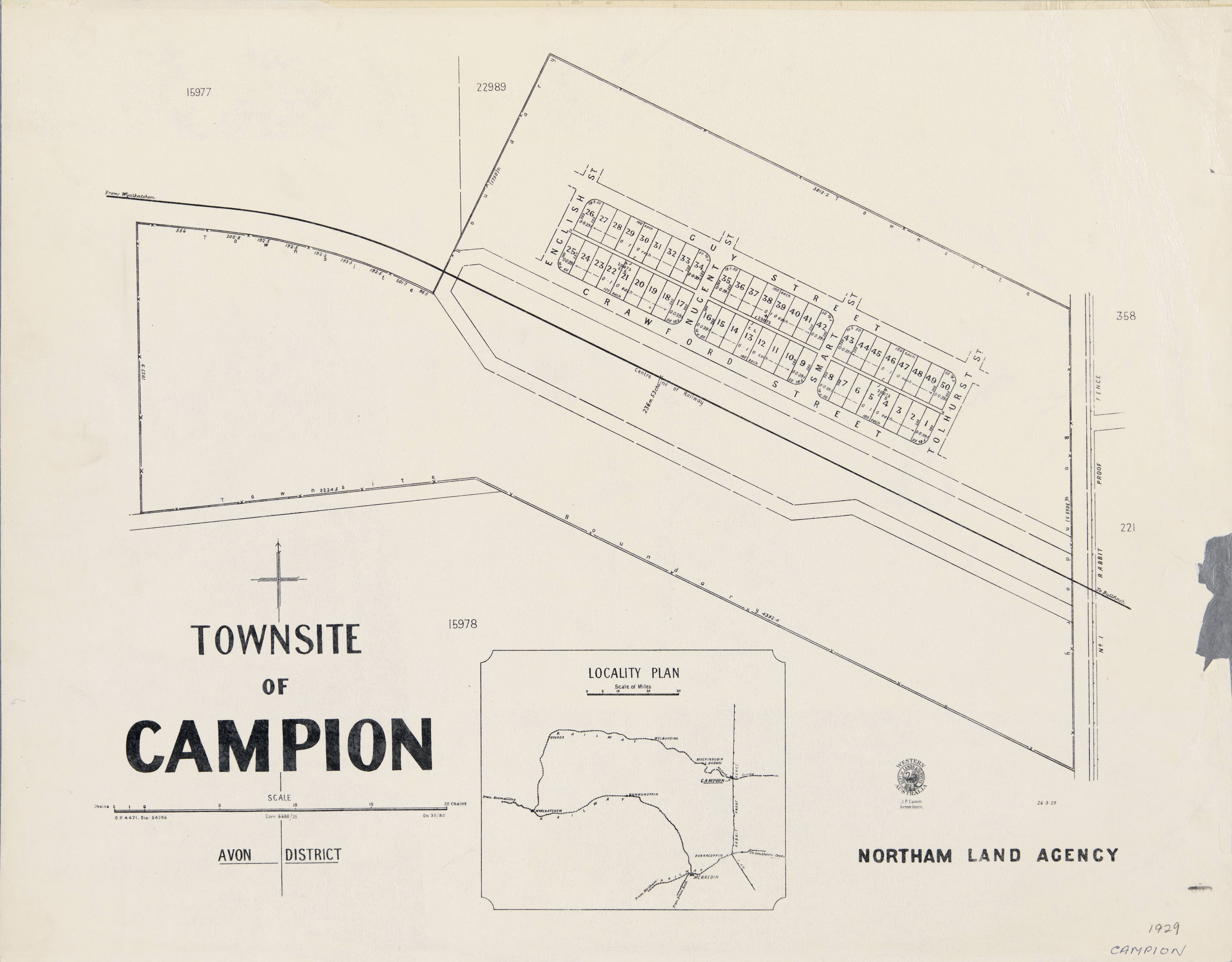
- Map of Campion townsite, 1929

- Coordinates: 31.029°S 118.5°E
- Country: Australia
- State: Western Australia
- LGA: Shire of Nungarin
- Location: 303 km (188 mi) east of Perth; 47 km (29 mi) NNE of Merredin
- Established: c. 1920

Government
  - State electorate: Central Wheatbelt
  - Federal division: Durack
- Postcode: 6490

Campion is an abandoned townsite in the Wheatbelt region of Western Australia, located in the Shire of Nungarin on the Koorda–Bullfinch Road. It is situated within the locality of Chandler, with the closest town being Mukinbudin.

== History ==
Agricultural settlement in the Campion district began in the early 1920s, with migrants and soldier-settlers being employed as clearing contractors by the Agricultural Bank of Western Australia and staying on to purchase their own blocks. The area was originally known as the East Lake Brown district, with nearby Lake Brown being one of a series of intermittent lakes in the area surveyed by John Septimus Roe in 1836 and named after Colonial Secretary Peter Broun. It was renamed Campion in 1925 after Sir William Campion, the newly appointed governor of Western Australia.

A state school was built in Campion in 1925 and opened by the local member of parliament Harry Griffiths, with around 100 people in attendance.

The Campion townsite was officially gazetted on 27 March 1929, following the extension of the Wyalkatchem to Mukinbudin railway line, with the townsite located at the intersection of the railway and the State Barrier Fence of Western Australia (the "rabbit-proof fence"). The section of the railway passing through Campion, during construction was known as the Lake Brown to Bullfinch railway.

The Campion ward elected one councillor to the Nungarin Shire Council. Sir William Campion visited the townsite named in his honour in 1930, in the second-last year of his term as governor. A local schoolteacher, Eunice Bedwell, recalled Campion's visit and described the townsite as comprising:

[...] two nondescript buildings, a small general store and an even smaller agent's building with the usual sheds at the back. The Governor was met by the President of the local RSL and regaled with a sumptuous lunch at one of the farms. Those farm ladies were marvellous cooks and on most farm holdings eggs and cream were in abundant supply. This was followed by a guided tour of the district, where the newly cultivated fields showed touches of early green crops on the rich red soil.

=== Demise ===
In 1928, the Campion district produced 40,000 bags of wheat. However, the local wheat industry was affected adversely by falling wheat prices in the late 1920s and the onset of the Great Depression in Australia. In 1932, the district was plagued by emus and sought the intervention of the federal government, resulting in the so-called Emu War.

Following the discovery of alunite on the west side of Lake Campion, a state-owned processing facility was established in 1942 and a new townsite was gazetted at nearby Chandler. Subsequently development activities focused on Chandler, with the Campion townsite remaining undeveloped and the local school being closed. The Campion railway siding was closed in 1956 and the townsite was cancelled in 1972.

== Environment ==
A species of carnivorous plant in the Byblidaceae family, Byblis rorida, is found on the shores of Lake Campion.
