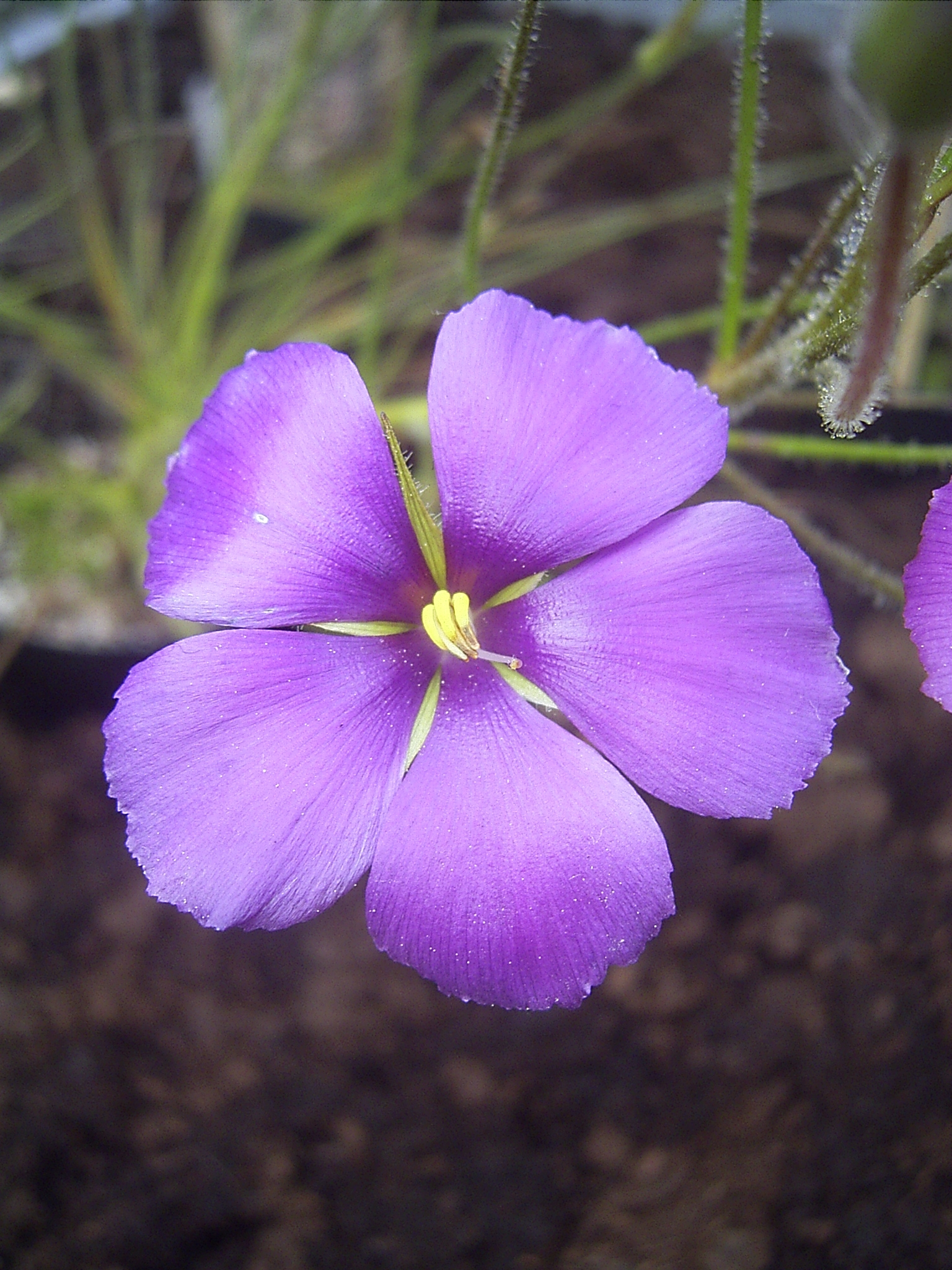

Conservation status
- Critically Endangered (IUCN 3.1)

Scientific classification
- Kingdom: Plantae
- Clade: Embryophytes
- Clade: Tracheophytes
- Clade: Angiosperms
- Clade: Eudicots
- Clade: Asterids
- Order: Lamiales
- Family: Byblidaceae
- Genus: Byblis
- Species: B. gigantea

Binomial name
- Byblis gigantea Lindl.

Synonyms
- Byblis lindleyana Planch.

= Byblis gigantea =

Rainbow plant

Species of carnivorous plant

Byblis gigantea, commonly known as rainbow plant, is a species of carnivorous plant in the family Byblidaceae. It is endemic to Australia.

== Description ==
The small perennial herb or sub-shrub has many branches and typically grows to a height of 0.45 metres (1.5 ft) in height. It is a tall leafy plant with the leaf bases closely spaced. It has deep, woody perennial rootstock that the plant is able to resprout from the rhizomes after fire. It blooms between September and January producing pink-purple and white flowers. According to Slack, the flowers only release their pollen when they sense vibrations from the wings of a pollinator. It has three nerved sepals and forms an obtuse subglobose shaped capsule with many faint nerves. The seeds have highly corrugated and ribbed sculptured plates. Seeds have a length of 0.6 to 1.5 millimetres (0.024 to 0.059 in) and a width of 0.6 to 1.0 mm (0.024 to 0.039 in) with shallow transverse ridges.

== Taxonomy ==
The species was first formally described by the botanist John Lindley in 1839 as part of the work A Sketch of the Vegetation of the Swan River Colony. The only known synonym is Byblis lindleyana as described by Jules Émile Planchon in 1848.

The type specimen was collected by James Drummond in 1839 from around the Swan River. The specific epithet is taken from the Latin word giganteus meaning giant referring to the larger size of this species compared to Byblis liniflora.

B. gigantea is closely related to Byblis lamellata but they have different seed morphology.

== Distribution ==
It has a scattered distribution from the Wheatbelt region around Dandaragan in the north down through the suburbs of Perth, Western Australia on the Swan Coastal Plain and into the Darling Range then south as far as Boddington in the Peel region. The plant is often found in and around swamps and seasonally wet areas growing in sandy peaty soils and is usually part of low Leptospermum and Restionaceae dominated shrubland communities.

== Conservation status ==
The species was listed a Critically Endangered on the International Union for Conservation of Nature red list in 2000.

In 2002 the species was listed as a "Priority Two" flora, mostly as a result of it being absent over much of its former range due to urban expansion throughout the Perth metropolitan area.

== Cultivation ==
B. gigantea prefers drier conditions than most sundews. It grows well in large pots containing a very sandy soil mix and is top-watered only. These plants are prone to fungal death until they become established. To germinate the seeds for this plant gibberellic acid treatment or pot fire treatment may be required. The age of the seeds is not important, seeds over 22 years of age have germinated after fire treatment.
