= Emu War =

1932 Australian nuisance wildlife management campaign

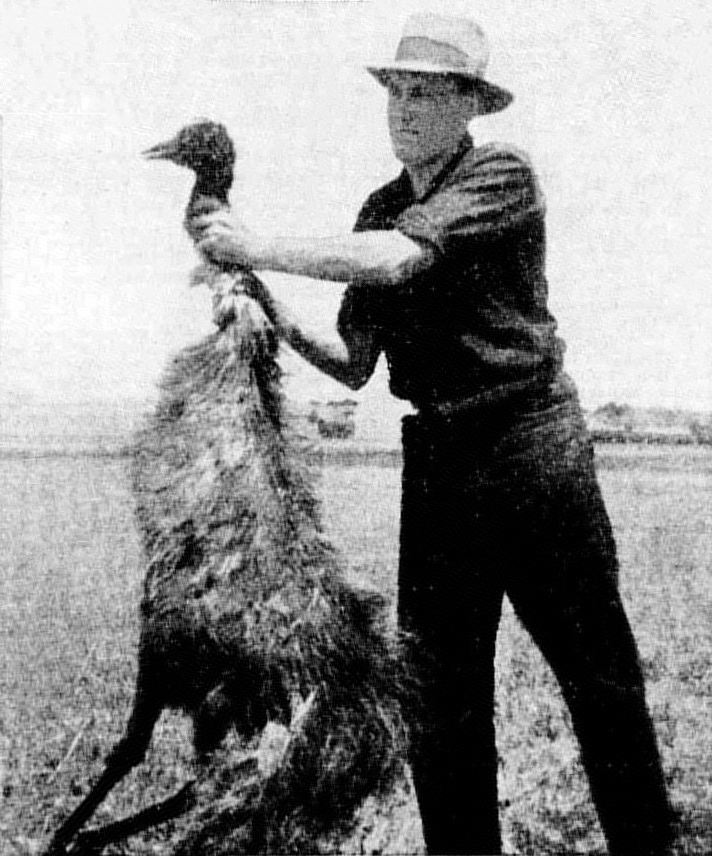
- A man holding an emu killed by Australian soldiers
- Location: Campion district, Western Australia
- Planned by: Sir George Pearce
- Commanded by: Major Gwynydd Purves Wynne-Aubrey Meredith of the Royal Australian Artillery
- Objective: Reduce the local emu population to reduce crop loss in Western Australia by the emus
- Date: 2 November – 10 December 1932 (1 month, 1 week and 1 day)
- Executed by: Australian Army
- Outcome: Minimal impact on the overall emu population.
- Casualties: 986 emus confirmed killed.

The Emu War (or Great Emu War) was a nuisance wildlife management operation undertaken by the Australian Army in late 1932.

The so-called 'war' was started in an attempt to cull emus damaging farmland in the Campion district within the Wheatbelt of Western Australia. A deputation of ex-soldiers requested the deployment of machine-guns to cull the emus, leading to Royal Australian Artillery soldiers armed with Lewis guns attempting to reduce emu numbers. The deployment of soldiers using machine-guns led the media to adopt the name "Emu War" when referring to the action.

The Australian military made two attempts to cull the emus, but both were largely ineffective, as the emus split into small, alert and highly mobile groups making the operation uneconomic. Individual emus proved surprisingly hard to kill, being compared to "tanks" by the Australian commander.

The attacks aroused both ridicule of the military and sympathy for the emus, and eventually the attempted cull was abandoned. Further requests for military assistance were rejected by the government, and alternative solutions, such as pest-exclusion fences, were utilised.

== Background ==
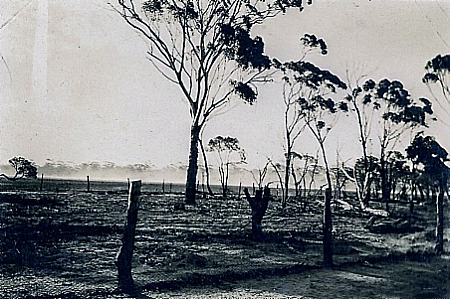
Fallow caused by emus

Following World War I, large numbers of discharged veterans who served in the war were given land by the Australian government to take up farming within Western Australia, often in agriculturally marginal areas. With the onset of the Great Depression in 1929, these farmers were encouraged to increase their wheat crops, with the government promising—and failing to deliver—assistance in the form of subsidies. Because of the recommendations and the promised subsidies, wheat prices continued to fall, and by October 1932, the situation intensified, with the farmers preparing to harvest the season's crop while simultaneously threatening to refuse to deliver the wheat.

The farmers' difficulties were worsened by the arrival of approximately 20,000 emus. Emus regularly migrate after their breeding season, heading to the coast from the inland regions. With the cleared land and additional water supplies being made available for livestock by the Western Australian farmers, the emus found that the cultivated lands were good habitat, and they began to foray into farm territory—in particular the marginal farming land around Chandler and Walgoolan. The emus consumed and spoiled the crops and left large gaps in fences where rabbits could enter and cause further problems.

Farmers relayed their concerns about the birds ravaging their crops, and a deputation of ex-soldiers were sent to meet with the Minister of Defence, Sir George Pearce. Having served in World War I, the soldier-settlers were well aware of the effectiveness of machine guns, and they requested their deployment. An article in The Daily News about the farmers' request to Pearce, dated 12 October 1932, contains the earliest recorded usage of the word "war" to refer to the then-planned operation.

The minister readily agreed, although with conditions attached: the guns were to be used by military personnel, troop transport was to be financed by the Western Australian government, and the farmers would provide food, accommodation, and payment for the ammunition. Pearce also supported the deployment on the grounds that the birds would make good target practice, while it has also been argued that some in the government may have viewed the operation as a way of being seen to be helping the Western Australian farmers, as well as to stave off the nascent secession movement. Toward that end, a cinematographer from Fox Movietone was enlisted.

== The "war" ==
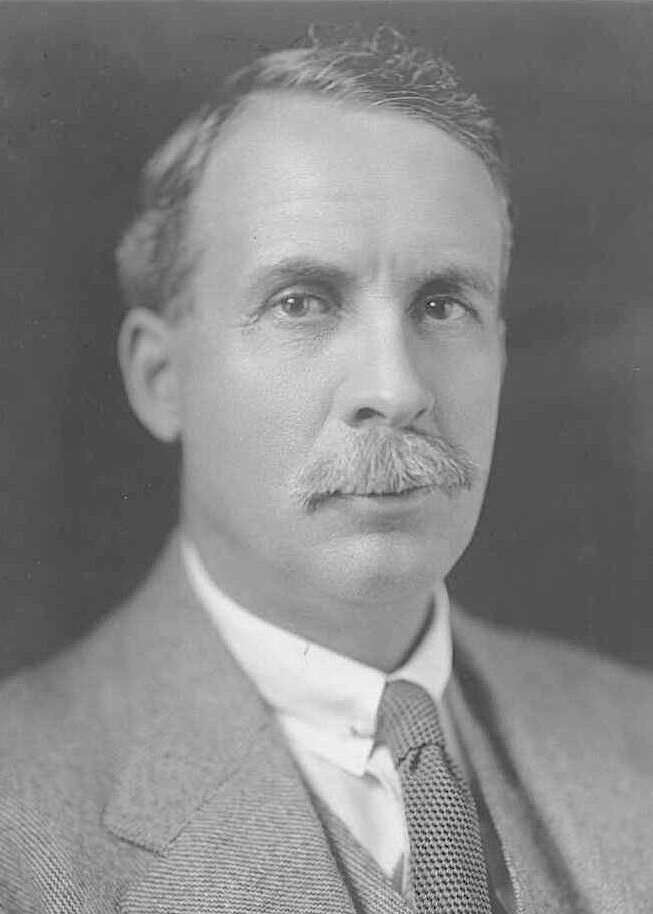
Defence minister Sir George Pearce ordered the army to cull the emu population. He was later called the "Minister of the Emu War" in parliament by Senator James Dunn.

Military involvement was due to begin in October 1932. The "war" was conducted under the command of Major Gwynydd Purves Wynne-Aubrey Meredith of the Royal Australian Artillery's 7th Heavy Artillery, with Meredith commanding soldiers Sergeant S. McMurray and Gunner J. O'Halloran, armed with two Lewis guns and 10,000 rounds of ammunition. The operation was delayed by a period of rainfall that caused the emus to scatter over a wider area. The rain ceased by 2 November 1932, whereupon the troops were deployed with orders to assist the farmers and, according to a newspaper account, to collect 100 emu skins so that their feathers could be used to make hats for light horsemen.

=== First attempt ===
On 2 November 1932, the men travelled to Campion, where some 50 emus were sighted. As the birds were out of range of the guns, the local settlers attempted to herd the emus into an ambush, but the birds split into small groups and ran so that they were difficult to target. Nevertheless, while the first fusillade from the machine guns was ineffective due to the range, a second round of gunfire was able to kill "a number" of birds. Later the same day a small flock was encountered, and "perhaps a dozen" birds were killed.

The next significant event was on 4 November. Meredith had established an ambush near a local dam, and more than 1,000 emus were spotted heading towards their position. This time, the gunners waited until the birds were in close proximity before opening fire. The gun jammed after only 12 birds were killed, and the remainder scattered before any more could be shot. No more birds were sighted that day.

In the days that followed, Meredith chose to move further south, where the birds were "reported to be fairly tame", but there was only limited success despite his efforts. By the fourth day of the campaign, army observers noted that "each pack seems to have its own leader now—a big black-plumed bird which stands fully six feet [1.8 m] high and keeps watch while his mates carry out their work of destruction and warns them of our approach". At one stage, Meredith even went so far as to mount one of the guns on a truck, a move that proved to be ineffective, as the truck was unable to gain on the birds, and the ride was so rough that the gunner was unable to fire any shots. By 8 November, six days after the first engagement, 2,500 rounds of ammunition had been fired. The number of birds killed is uncertain: one account estimates that it was 50 birds, but other accounts range from 200 to 500, the latter figure being provided by the settlers. Meredith's official report noted that his men had suffered no casualties, except for their dignity.

Summarising the culls, ornithologist Dominic Serventy commented:

The machine-gunners' dreams of point-blank fire into serried masses of Emus were soon dissipated. The Emu command had evidently ordered guerrilla tactics, and its unwieldy army soon split up into innumerable small units that made use of the military equipment uneconomic. A crestfallen field force therefore withdrew from the combat area after about a month.

On 8 November, members in the Australian House of Representatives discussed the operation. Following the negative coverage of the events in the local media, which included claims that "only a few" emus had died, Pearce withdrew the military personnel and the guns on 8 November.

After the withdrawal, Major Meredith compared the emus to Zulus and commented on the striking manoeuvrability of the emus, even while badly wounded.

If we had a military division with the bullet-carrying capacity of these birds, it would face any army in the world ... They can face machine guns with the invulnerability of tanks. They are like Zulus whom even dum-dum bullets could not stop.

=== Second attempt ===
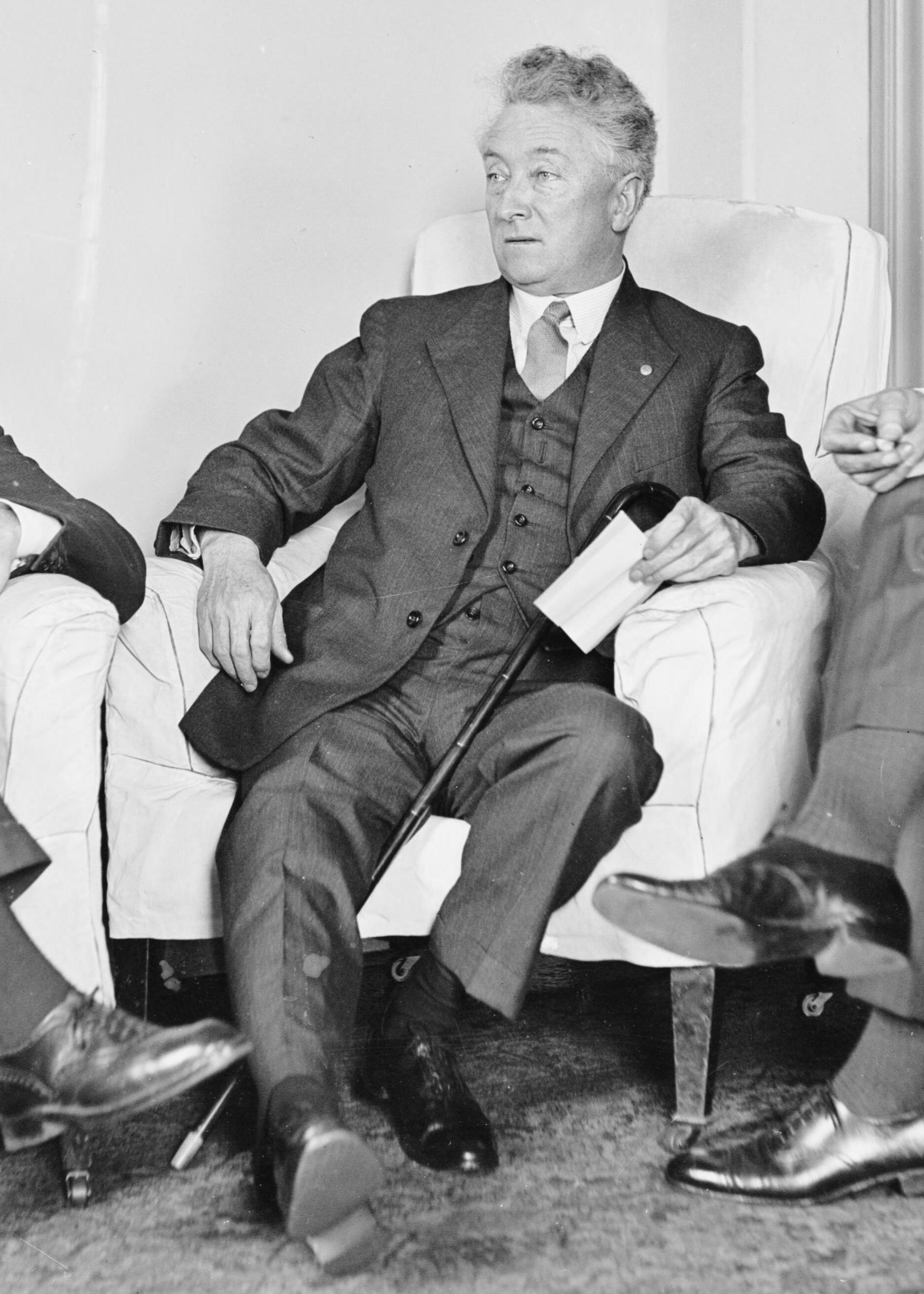
In November 1932, during parliamentary question time, Prime Minister Joseph Lyons (pictured) was mockingly asked by Lang Labor MP Rowley James whether a medal would be struck for the soldiers.

After the withdrawal of the military, the emu attacks on crops continued. Farmers again asked for support, citing the hot weather and drought that brought emus invading farms in the thousands. James Mitchell, the Premier of Western Australia, lent his strong support for the renewal of military assistance. At the same time, a report from the Base Commander was issued that indicated 300 emus had been killed in the initial operation.

Acting on the requests and the Base Commander's report, by 12 November the Minister of Defence approved a resumption of military efforts. He defended the decision in the Senate, explaining why the soldiers were necessary to combat the serious agricultural threat of the large emu population. Although the military had agreed to lend the guns to the Western Australian government on the expectation that they would provide the necessary people, Meredith was once again placed in the field due to an apparent lack of experienced machine gunners in the state.

Taking to the field on 13 November 1932, the military found a degree of success over the first two days, with approximately 40 emus killed. The third day, 15 November, proved to be far less successful, but by 2 December, the soldiers were killing approximately 100 emus per week. Meredith was recalled on 10 December, and in his report, he claimed 986 confirmed kills with 9,860 rounds, at a rate of exactly 10 rounds per confirmed kill. In addition, Meredith claimed exactly 2,500 wounded birds had also died from their injuries. Historian Greg Beyer wrote, "This figure, however, is highly disputed and is likely to be very inflated."

In assessing the success of the cull, an article in the Coolgardie Miner on 23 August 1935 reported that although the use of machine guns had been "criticised in many quarters, the method proved effective and saved what remained of the wheat".

== Aftermath ==
Despite the problems encountered with the cull, the farmers of the region once again requested military assistance in 1934, 1943, and 1948, but were turned down by the government. Instead, the bounty system that had been instigated in 1923 was continued, and this proved to be effective: 57,034 bounties were claimed over a six-month period in 1934.

By December 1932, word of the Emu War had spread, reaching the United Kingdom. Some conservationists there protested the cull as "extermination of the rare emu". Dominic Serventy and Hubert Whittell, the eminent Australian ornithologists, described the "war" as "an attempt at the mass destruction of the birds".

Throughout 1930 and onward, exclusion barrier fencing became a popular means of keeping emus out of agricultural areas (in addition to other vermin, such as dingoes and rabbits).

In November 1950, Hugh Leslie raised the issues of emus in federal parliament and urged Army Minister Josiah Francis to release a quantity of .303 ammunition from the army for the use of farmers. The minister approved the release of 500,000 rounds of ammunition.

== Legacy ==
The Emu War began to attract global attention in the 2010s as an Internet meme.

In 2018, Australian comedy group Hot Dad Productions created a parody trailer for a film entitled The Emu War. In May 2021, they received funding from Screen Australia to adapt the trailer into a full series. In October 2023, the project premiered as a film at Monster Fest, featuring emu puppets alongside a live-action cast of Australian comedians, including Damian Callinan, Luke McGregor, and Naomi Higgins. Separately, in January 2021, Australian comedian Monty Franklin announced that he, John Cleese and Rob Schneider were writing a film entitled The Great Emu War. By October 2021, Jim Jefferies, Rhys Darby, producer Robyn Kershaw, and musician Moby were attached to the film. The project subsequently entered development hell; as of 2026, The Great Emu War has not yet started filming.

On 17 July 2026, a Reuters columnist suggested that Donald Trump could apply the lessons of the Emu War to the 2026 Iran war. In particular, the columnist suggested that the Emu War shows that military victory of a technologically superior force over a dispersed and determined foe is problematic and containment is a more viable strategy.

== See also ==
- Brumby shooting
- Dingo Fence
- Eliminate Sparrows campaign
- Rabbits in Australia
