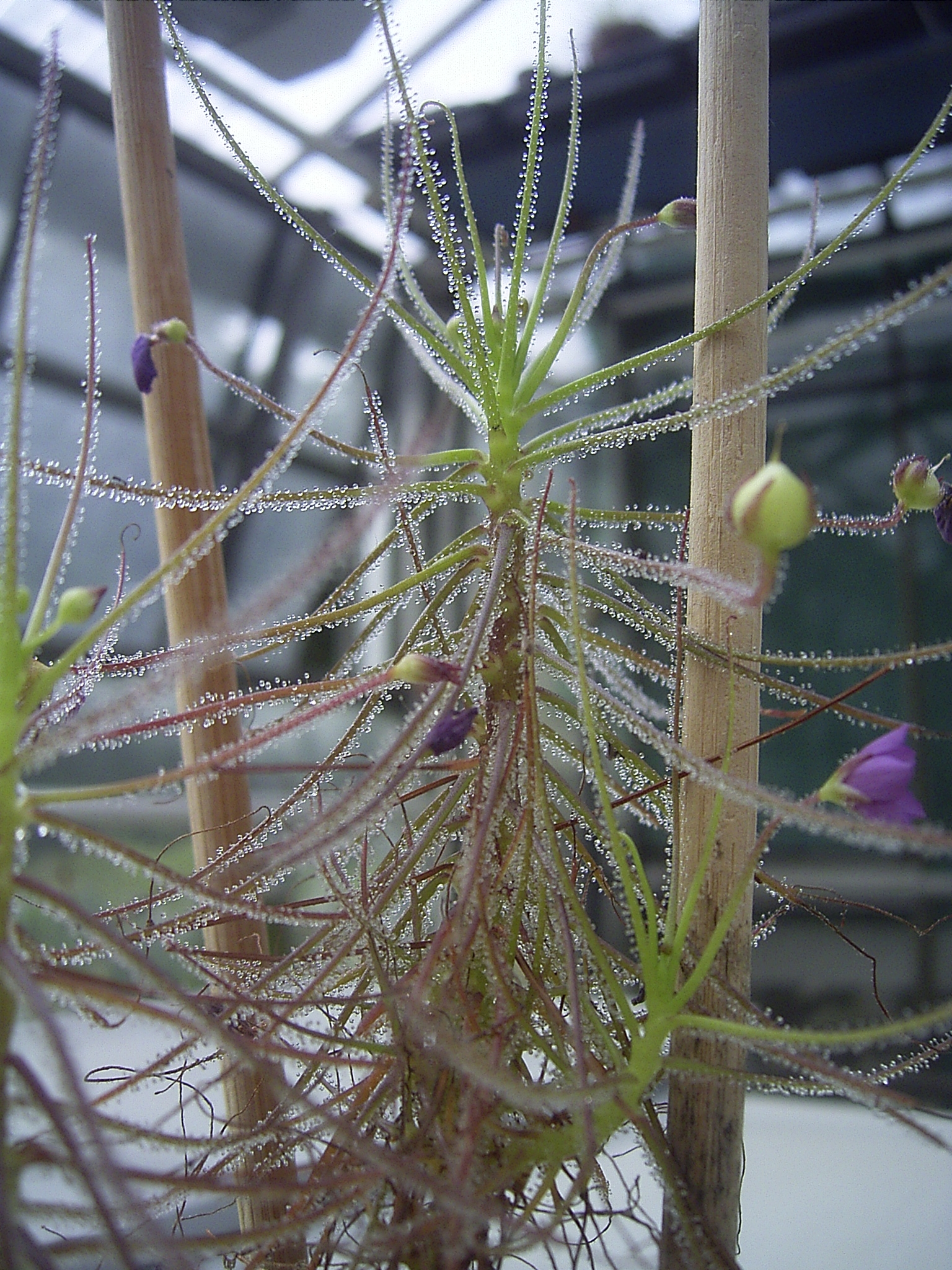

Conservation status
- Least Concern (IUCN 3.1)

Scientific classification
- Kingdom: Plantae
- Clade: Tracheophytes
- Clade: Angiosperms
- Clade: Eudicots
- Clade: Asterids
- Order: Lamiales
- Family: Byblidaceae
- Genus: Byblis
- Species: B. aquatica

Binomial name
- Byblis aquatica Lowrie & Conran (1998)

= Byblis aquatica =

Species of carnivorous plant

Byblis aquatica is an insectivorous plant belonging to the genus Byblis, commonly known as the rainbow plants. It was described by Allen Lowrie and John Godfrey Conran in 1998, assigned to a group of annual north Australian species known as the "Byblis liniflora complex". It grows in semi-aquatic conditions and uses stalked mucilaginous glands (similar to those employed by the unrelated sundews and Drosophyllum) covering its leaf surfaces to attract, catch, and digest insect prey to supplement the poor environmental nutrient supply.

== Taxonomy ==
Byblis aquatica was first collected by Allen Lowrie in April 1988. In cultivation it was taken for an ecotype of B. liniflora and assigned the name Byblis aff. liniflora "Darwin". It remained thus until Barry Meyers-Rice demonstrated evidence of the reproductive isolation of the species, at which Jan Flisek suggested the description of the taxa as a new species in 1996. Allen Lowrie did so as part of his revision of north Australian species in 1998.

== Description ==
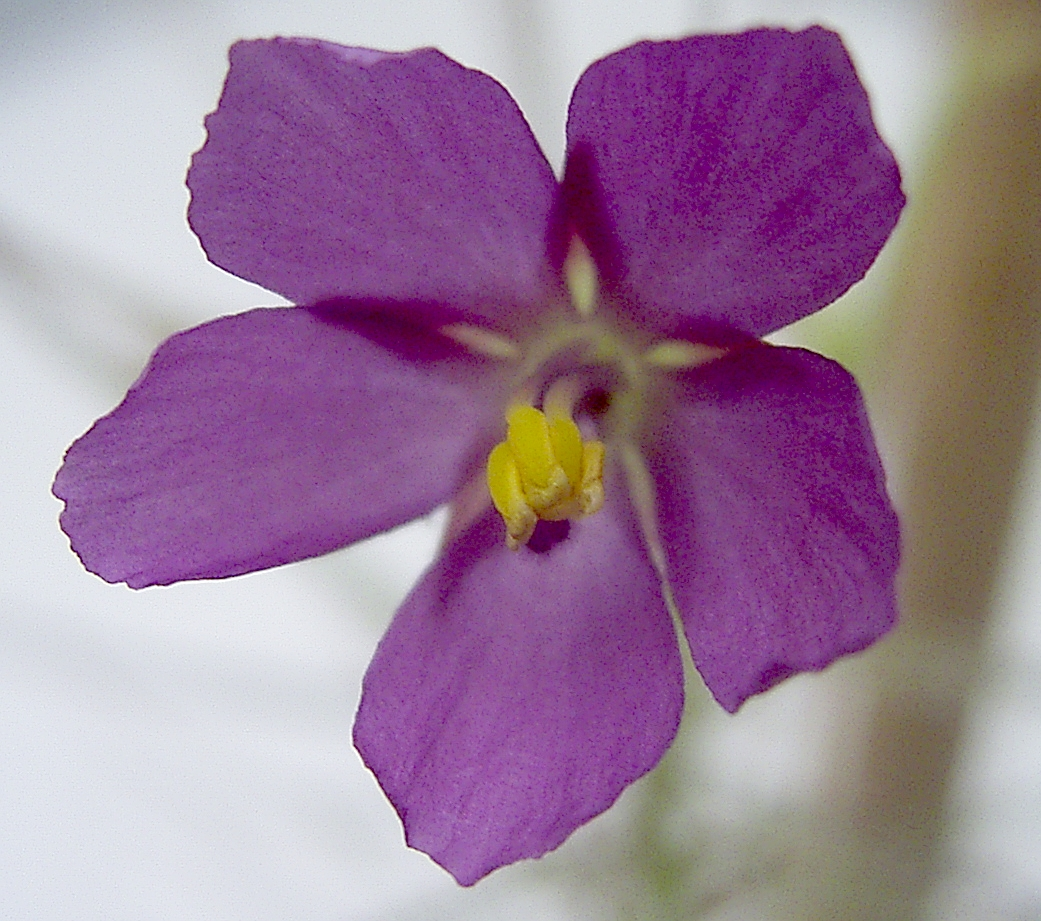
Byblis aquatica flower

Byblis aquatica is an annual plant with a usually unbranching central stem supported by fine, fibrous roots. The central stem can reach a length of 45 centimetres (18 in), although it is only able to support its own weight during early growth (<5 cm.). After that it leans on neighboring plants for support, eventually toppling and growing horizontally along the ground or water surface, with only the growth tip growing uprightly.

The plant's leaves are 2–4 centimetres (0.79–1.57 in) long, highly filiform (elongated and narrow), round in cross-section and tapering at the end. Young leaves are bright green and grow uprightly; as they age, they darken to a maroon (color) and droop. The leaf surface is covered with stalked mucilaginous glands along its entire length. These serve not only to attract and trap insect prey, but also allow the plant to "hold on" to neighboring structures for support.

Byblis aquatica flowers are born singly at the tip of 1.5–3-centimetre (0.59–1.18 in) stems similar in appearance to the leaves. These emerge from the leaf axes in mature plants. The five-petaled, deep purple flowers appear between January and May (during the Australian summer), although only a few at a time.

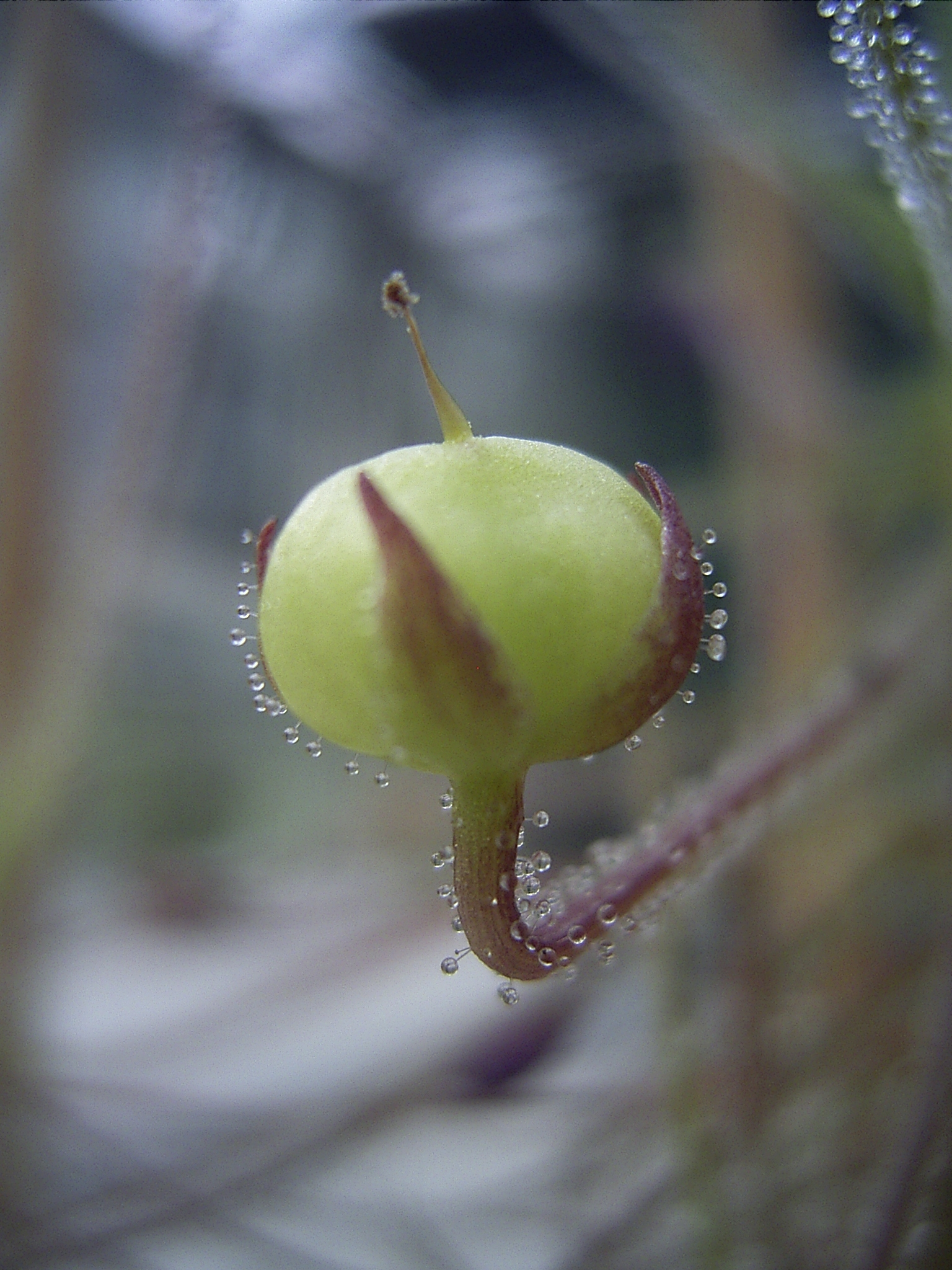
B. aquatica seed capsule

The generally glabrous, ovate sepals are 3–4 millimetres (0.12–0.16 in) long. The obovate petals are deep purple, 5–7 millimetres (0.20–0.28 in) long and up to 4.5 millimetres (0.18 in) wide, and have notched margins. The filaments are 2–2.5 millimetres (0.079–0.098 in) long, bearing 0.9–1.3-millimetre (0.035–0.051 in) anthers. The pistils are 2–2.5 mm long and bear a rough stigma.

Fertilized flowers mature to form a 5–10-millimetre (0.20–0.39 in) by 3–5-millimetre (0.12–0.20 in) egg-shaped, two-parted seed capsules. The dry capsule only opens after being soaked in water(see water dispersal). The black, 1–1.3-millimetre (0.039–0.051 in) long seeds are grooved lengthwise.

== Distribution and habitat ==
This species has a very limited distribution in the Australian Northern Territory. It is endemic to the area between Darwin and Berry Springs and has also been found on Bathurst Island. It grows in the loamy sand of seasonally flooded depressions and in the shallow margins of freshwater lagoons.
