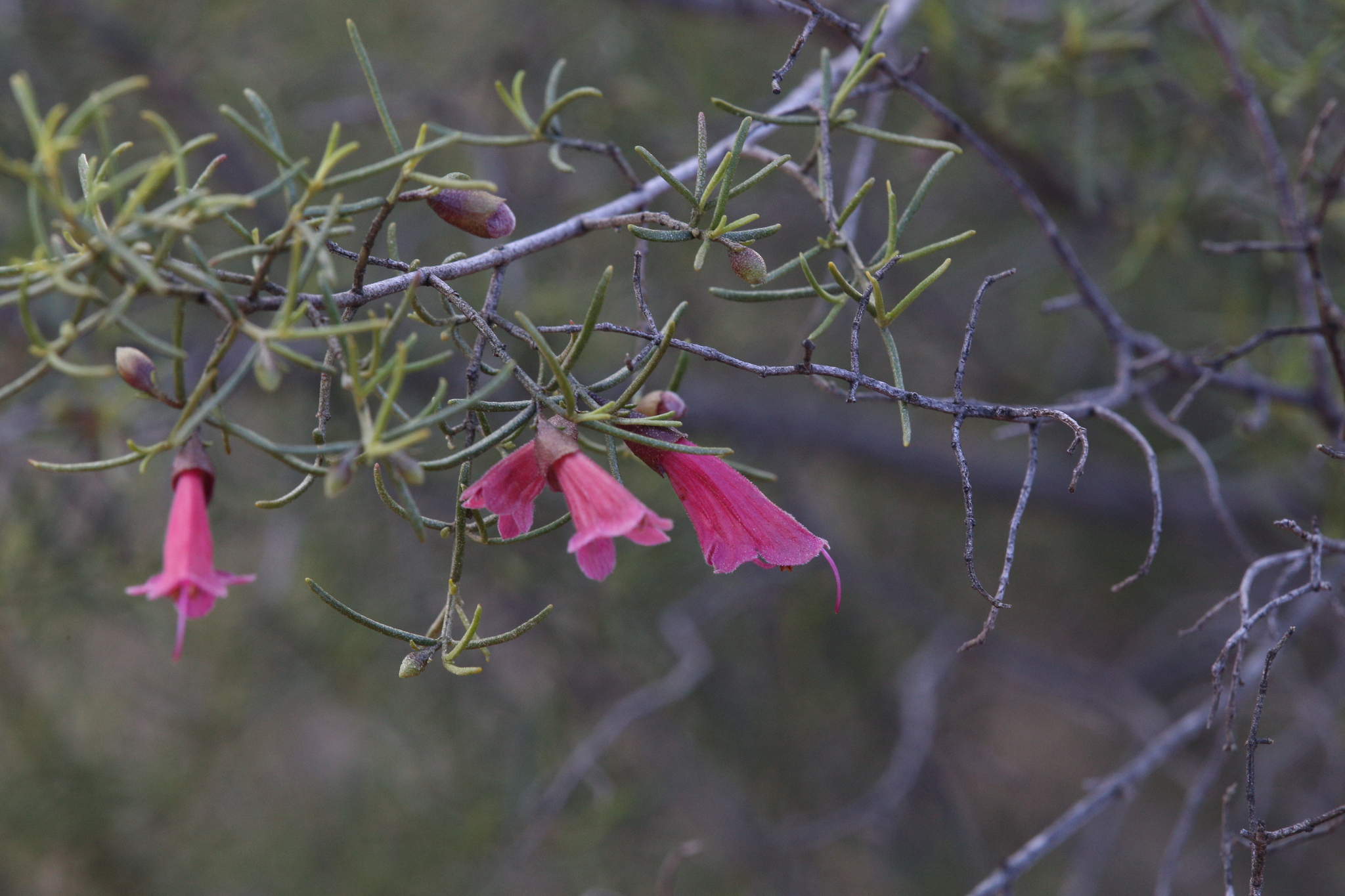

Scientific classification
- Kingdom: Plantae
- Clade: Tracheophytes
- Clade: Angiosperms
- Clade: Eudicots
- Clade: Asterids
- Order: Lamiales
- Family: Lamiaceae
- Genus: Prostanthera
- Species: P. semiteres

Binomial name
- Prostanthera semiteres B.J.Conn
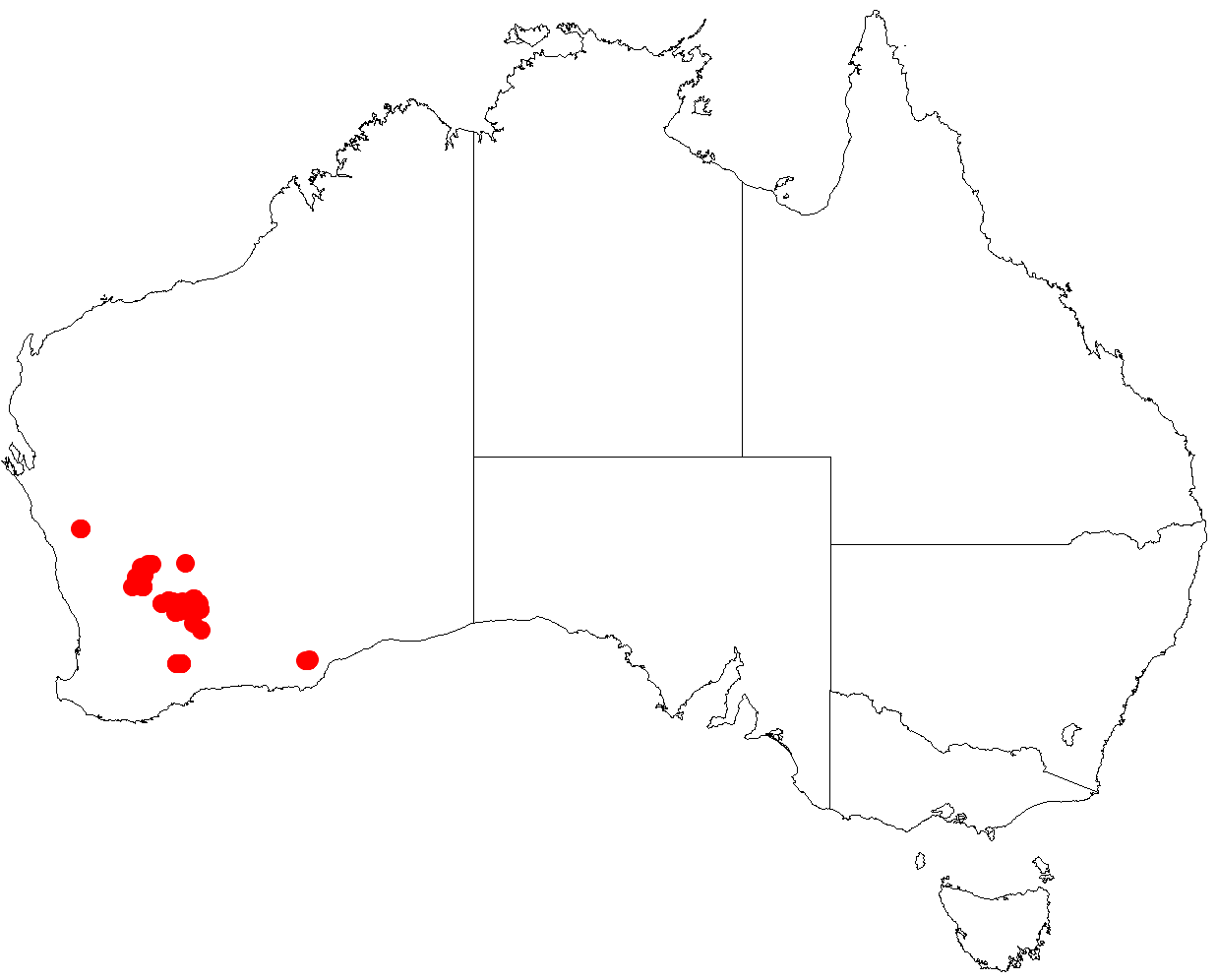
- Occurrence data from AVH

= Prostanthera semiteres =

Species of flowering plant

Prostanthera semiteres is a species of flowering plant in the family Lamiaceae and is endemic to Western Australia. It is a small shrub with narrow egg-shaped leaves with the narrower end towards the base and pink or red flowers.

== Description ==
Prostanthera semiteres is a shrub that typically grows to a height of up to 1.4 m (4 ft 7 in) and has hairless branches. The leaves are glabrous, narrow, oblong or egg-shaped with the narrower end towards the base, 2–12 mm (0.079–0.472 in) long, 0.5–1.2 mm (0.020–0.047 in) wide and sessile or on a short petiole. The flowers are borne singly in leaf axils on a pedicel 3–15 mm (0.12–0.59 in) long, the sepals 5–7.5 mm (0.20–0.30 in) long and forming a tube 4–6 mm (0.16–0.24 in) long with two lobes 0.5–2 mm (0.020–0.079 in) long and 3–5 mm (0.12–0.20 in) wide. The petals are pink or red, 16–25 mm (0.63–0.98 in) long and form a tube 6–14 mm (0.24–0.55 in) long. The lower lip of the petal tube has three lobes, the centre lobe egg-shaped, 2–3.5 mm (0.079–0.138 in) long and the side lobes 1–3 mm (0.039–0.118 in) long. The upper lip is 3–5 mm (0.12–0.20 in) long with a central notch up to 1.5 mm (0.059 in) deep.

== Taxonomy ==
Prostanthera semiteres was first formally described in 1984 by Barry Conn in the Journal of the Adelaide Botanic Gardens from specimens collected near Campion by Robert Chinnock in 1976.

In the same journal, Conn described two subspecies and the names are accepted by the Australian Plant Census:

- Prostanthera semiteres subsp. intricata that has leaves 2–6 mm (0.079–0.236 in) long and pedicels 7–15 mm (0.28–0.59 in) long;
- Prostanthera semiteres subsp. semiteres that has leaves mostly 9–11 mm (0.35–0.43 in) long and pedicels up to 5.5 mm (0.22 in) long.

== Distribution and habitat ==
This mintbush grows between granite rocks in the Avon Wheatbelt, Coolgardie and Mallee biogeographic regions of Western Australia.

== Conservation status ==
Both subspecies of P. semiteres are classified as "not threatened" by the Government of Western Australia Department of Parks and Wildlife.
