= Brumby shooting =

Eradication of feral horses in Australia

Brumby shooting or brumbies shooting is the practice of eradicating feral horses, or "brumbies", in Australia. It has been conducted since the 1800s, and continues into the present day. The term "brumby" was first recorded in the 1870s. Reasons for brumby shooting include, but are not limited to: demands for grazing land and water for domestic herds, sport, to maintain pastoral stations, to reduce environmental damage caused by the horses, to control disease, and to prevent possible road collisions.

Brumby shooting became a boom industry from the 1870s to the mid-1890s. It was reflected in the poetry and literature of the time, and also became a popular sporting pastime.

It has been speculated that there are over one million feral horses in Australia.

== Background ==
Horses were first imported into Australia in 1788 for agricultural and utility work. By 1800, about 200 horses are thought to have been imported. Only the strongest horses survived the long sea journey, making for a healthy and strong stock which flourished.

From 1820 to 1860, the horse population in Australia increased a hundredfold from 3,969 to 431,525, which was an increase of about 12.5% per year. It is not known when the first wild mobs (groups of brumbies) appeared but, once established, feral horses would have increased at a similar or greater rate with numbers further boosted by escapees and rejected horses released into the bush.

In 1840, it was reported that there were many horses running wild throughout the Botany colony. In 1843, it was noted that wild horses and cattle were becoming pests in New South Wales (NSW). In 1844, Ludwig Leichhardt, a German naturalist who explored northern and central Australia, reported seeing horses on the Dawson River, which was several hundred miles from the nearest station (public grazing land leased to a homestead).

In 1850, The Perth Gazette and Independent Journal of Politics and News described the feral horses as "A nuisance of no slight present importance to the breeders of horses, and which will probably hereafter prove to be a serious drawback, unless some measure is taken for its abatement." In response to this, the measure advocated was the culling of brumbies.

Some of these wild horses were captured and auctioned at the horse bazaars, but did not sell easily. In 1854, the Sydney Morning Herald reported that, "the sale-yards are full of miserable animals ... Good horses always sell well; unbroken stock and scrubbers are of no use whatever".

By this time there were wild horses in every district in the colony. In 1854 in New England, it was reported that there were thousands of wild horses abundant in the bush. In 1860, 100,000 wild horses in NSW was regarded as an underestimate. According to The Age, a daily newspaper in Melbourne, herds of cattle and troops of wild horses emptied all the shallow water-holes between the Darling River and Lachlan River, an activity which was also reported in the neighbouring mountain regions and in the Upper Shoalhaven. In 1864, the Bendigo Advertiser reported that hundreds of brumbies were seen on the back blocks of the Karamba run on the Murray River, as well as from Loxton to Swan Reach.

The buildup of the wild horse population was unwelcome. A letter printed in the Bathurst Free Press and Mining Journal described the wild horses as being of "worthless character" and a cause for a drop in the prices of reared horses and a depletion in available grassing land. Options considered for the abundant wild horse population included to be "boiled down and converted into glue, tallow, leather, salt-beef, and other substances of exportable value."

Social problems were also linked to the feral horses. An 1870 report of the Chief Inspector of Stock for NSW said that the running of wild horses had served as a youth initiation into cattle raiding (called duffing). The economic temptation was felt to be corrupting to the currency lads in outlying areas.

== Legalisation ==
The NSW Impounding Act was approved on 20 June 1865, and gave authority for landholders and squatters to destroy unbranded horses or cattle on their land. Previously, the only legal recourse was to drive unwanted stock to the nearest public pound.

Debate on the bill in the NSW Parliament as recorded in the Sydney Morning Herald shows that parliament needed no convincing for this measure. John Robertson, then the Secretary for Lands, called the wild horses "a perfect nuisance" to the landowners, and it was noted that their shooting would increase productive use of the land, provide employment, and sustain itself through the sale of meat for pig feed.

== Economic pressures ==
In 1866, the Sydney Morning Herald reported that wild cattle and horses had left most runs valueless, and that men always carried a rifle to kill any such animal encountered. It stated that the efforts at taming the horses were wasted as they were undependable.

=== Pig feed ===
In 1868, the Manaro Mercury investigated the claim that feral horses were only useful for feeding pigs, and found it to be "the prevailing opinion in this district". The story described this as a regular practise for the feral horses sold at government pounds. A similar story appeared in The Sydney Morning Herald in 1871. In 1921, Mr J. Jardine, son of Monaro pioneer William Jardine, recalled that "the country was run over by wild horses, which were sold to feed pigs at 12 for a shilling."

=== Horse breeding ===
During this time, there was a good market in India for NSW horses, called Walers from 1846. The bulk of the shipment to India were thoroughbred horses from the best studs. Some inferior horses were shipped to India and threatened the high regard held for Walers. The established horse traders would certainly have been opposed to the export of brumbies, which would have damaged the reputation of Australia's stock.

Public discourse by horse breeders in the 1860s called for a tax on brood mares to raise funds for "encouragement of improved breeding" and the destruction of brumbies. Alexander Bruce, the NSW Chief Inspector of Stock, wrote that Australia's horse stock had become a "mongrel race" affected by cross-breeding.

== Shooters ==
Newspaper reports of the 1870s described the difficult lives of professional brumby shooters: carrying out unpleasant work from dawn to dusk, with no comforts and inadequate pay. It was a "newborn calling", and the slaughter required an adjustment of values, to reduce what had been considered a noble animal to its base price of hide and hair. The "murderous and nasty work", as described by one shooter, had to be balanced with the good brought to the generation of squatters who might otherwise be ruined.

The brumby shooters were soon busy across the country in a "war of extermination". Over a generation, Brumby hunting became a popular pastime of the period, and young men from towns would gather in pairs and troops to hunt brumbies on Sundays and holidays. The slaughter was a full industry in 1895, bringing 6 shillings a hide, and employing numerous professional hunters. Hunts, along with increased settlement, had reduced the brumby problem in the early twentieth century. However, they were never eradicated and populations would rebound and repeatedly grew to the point that organized shooting was felt necessary.

Women as principals and with their husbands joined the shooters.

Demand for horses had gone up by the mid-1930s and some brumbies were captured and brought in for sale. The best animals were kept for draft and pack horses, the unhealthy or inbred horses were killed, and those remaining were sold.

Brumbies continued to be reported as a problem in the early 1950s, and though brumby shooting was revived as a pastime there was a lack of experienced men and suitable ammunition for an extensive cull. Increased prices for horsehair and hides were hoped to attract hunters, and government aid was sought.

In 1947, pastoralist E. A. Brooks advocated use of airplanes to kill brumbies with strafing fire, as the practice of ambushing them at water sources was inadequate to their eradication. A few years later, aerial marksmen in helicopters were employed in coordinated control programs to pursue and destroy entire mobs of brumbies.

In the 1960s, cattlemen in the high country grazing areas conducted intensive culling, halving the number of brumbies in some areas.

In the 21st century, brumbies, along with feral donkeys, pigs and buffalo, were routinely shot from helicopters in organized culls in the Northern Territory and Western Australia.

== Notable hunts and shooters ==
- In the first half of 1871, 1,527 brumbies were reported shot on the east side of the Bogan River, with similar numbers expected as the hunt moved to the west side.
- Alexander Ryrie, owner of Micelago Run in Monaro, killed about 1,400 brumbies in two-and-a-half years.
- Under contract to the Australian Agricultural Company, Edward Corbett and William Ellis shot 1,500 brumbies on the Gloucester run in 1872–1873.
- The Green brothers collected 25,000 horse hides over a few years from the mountainous country around Oberon, Shooter's Hill, and Porter's Retreat.
- Many thousands a year were killed on a run of the Dawson River.
- Over 8,000 were trapped and shot in a summer season at Eurombah in the 1890s.
- Ben Supple was a well-known hunter credited for exterminating the extensive number of brumbies at Walra station on the Macleay River.
- In the mid-1890s, J. Nixon led a party that shot nearly 3,500 brumbies over eighteen months at Rawbelle station and Culcralgie station.
- The Brisbane Courier reported on 15 May 1924 that brumbies had become a severe pest in the Cape York Peninsula, and that Mr. Massey and his son had killed 964 brumbies. Massey stated that there were "easily a couple of thousand more running wild".
- In 1927, the Western Star And Roma Advertiser reported that a shooter on Alexander Downs had killed 2,000 brumbies in a season at one shilling each.
- In 1930, a "brumby menace" was reported by the Queensland Times.
- Some of the brumbies were reported to be the offspring of animals set free when the Beerburrum Soldier Settlement was abandoned.

The government responded by amending the Diseases in Stock Act to provide for the destruction of the animals, with brumby shooting limited to four months a year and to districts determined by the ministry. Proclamations named the Bowen, Maryborough and Townsville, Roma, Toowoomba and Rockhampton stock districts, and newspapers reported "open season" on brumbies. Additional hunts were authorized through the mid-1930s.

- By the mid-1940s, brumbies were again considered a serious problem threatening big stock rearing. At Clifton Hill Station, 4,000–5,000 brumbies had been shot without diminishing their impact. In 18 months, 8,000 brumbies had been shot along the Cooper River.
- In 1949, the eastern suburbs of Sydney were invaded by brumbies, which damaged gardens and fences. Acting on a petition by residents of Diamond Bay, Alderman K. B. Armstrong advocated that the police shoot the animals, as they had no stockade to hold them.

== Contemporary issues ==
=== Road safety ===
Motor vehicle collisions involving horses have been occurring in Australia since the 1920s. A study of crashes in the 1990s found that over five years, 24 fatalities involved "stock" (which may include horses) and 13 involved a "horse/large animal".

Feral horses were shot after two fatalities occurred within 2 to 3 kilometers of each other on the Bruce Highway near the Clement State Forest north of Townsville in 2015. The coroner's report noted that a cull of feral horses was approved in 2006–07, but was abandoned after protests from animal-rights groups. Attempts to relocate animals were constrained by costs and threats. Following the deaths, aerial culls and ground shooting removed 203 horses from the forest.

The average cost of each road fatality to the Australian economy was over $4 million.

=== Disease ===
The 2007 Australian equine influenza outbreak demonstrated that exotic diseases pose a serious threat to Australia's horse industry. Outbreaks of equine pneumonitis and equine metritis occurred in 1977 despite Australia's isolation and strict quarantine measures. Diseases in the feral population could threaten the country's horse industry, estimated to bring $6.3 billion to GDP in 2001.

Feral horses can also harbour disease threats to beef and dairy cattle. Wild horses were shot as part of the campaign in NSW to eradicate cattle tick, the most serious external parasite of Australian cattle. NSW was declared free of cattle ticks.

Horses can also carry brucellosis and thousands were mustered in the far north in the 1980s under the Brucellosis-Tuberculosis eradication program. Brumbies which could not be mustered were shot from helicopters. The international community accepted that the disease was eradicated in 1989.

=== Conservation ===
Feral horses have a considerable impact on their environment, affecting vegetation, water sources, soil, and compete with native species for resources. Early pastoralists noted this damage, cutting grass close and leaving the soil vulnerable to erosion, while compacting the soil to hinder water retention. This could permanently damage the grassland and heath habitats.

=== Cultural impact ===
Feral horses damaged Indigenous heritage sites in Carnarvon National Park, by licking artwork and raising dust.

Control of feral horses in national parks has been compromised by politics. An overview of the history is summarised in Proceedings of the National Feral Horse Management Workshop – Canberra, August 2006'

== Opposition ==
Whether the brumby should be considered a cultural icon or a pest is debated. Some regard it as a pest, like the rabbit, which has seen various eradication campaigns.

The heritage value claim of brumbies has undergone testing. Conformation data and genetic markers from 36 horses – 16 selected horses from the Guy Fawkes River National Park (GFRNP) brumbies and 20 horses classified as Walers – were sampled and assessed by scientists from Sydney and Kentucky. It was concluded that neither group were "genetically unique" and that they were the product of continual introduction of outside horses. An investigation into the brumbies in Barmah National Park found that they had mainly originated from horses released by a local breeder after 1952 and that there was no significant long-term population of wild horses in the park area prior to this date, thus debunking claims as to their genetic and historical significance.

The Animal Justice Party opposes the aerial and ground shooting of feral horses and would outlaw the use of all lethal control methods on brumbies in favour of what it claims as safe, humane and effective fertility control methods. These methods are likely to be ineffective and cost prohibitive, whilst failing to resolve the critical impacts of feral horses on endangered species and habitats.

== In culture ==
In 1877, newspapers gave an account of a brumby hunt that could have been the inspiration for the poem The Man from Snowy River. It described J. R. Battye, who took part in a hunt while on holidays. His party located a mob of brumbies, and as they gave chase the bridle came off Battye's horse; with no control, he spurred the horse which followed the brumbies over ground thickly timbered and full of holes and came up with them, bringing Battye into shooting range.

In 1875, The Queenslander published a poem about the life of the brumby shooter.

There's plenty of "up in the saddle," no doubt;
And there's plenty of "sport" of its kind;
And wild herds of "brumbies" to scatter and rout,
And send galloping off like the wind.

Along with the excitement, it describes a life of hardship, yet the shooter remains compassionate for the animals while carrying out his "murderous trade" and dreams of the beauties who might be fashioned in horse hair.

== See also ==
- Invasive species in Australia
  - Feral donkeys in Australia
  - Rabbits in Australia
- Animal population control
- Free-roaming horse management in North America
- Hunting in Australia
- Emu War
