= Byblis guehoi =

Conservation status
- Vulnerable (IUCN 3.1)

Scientific classification
- Kingdom: Plantae
- Clade: Tracheophytes
- Clade: Angiosperms
- Clade: Eudicots
- Clade: Asterids
- Order: Lamiales
- Family: Byblidaceae
- Genus: Byblis
- Species: B. guehoi

Binomial name
- Byblis guehoi Lowrie & Conran

Species of carnivorous plant

Byblis guehoi is a species of carnivorous plant in the genus Byblis. It is a compact species and is tetraploid. It was described in 2008 by Allen Lowrie and John Godfrey Conran. It is endemic to the Kimberley region of Western Australia.
