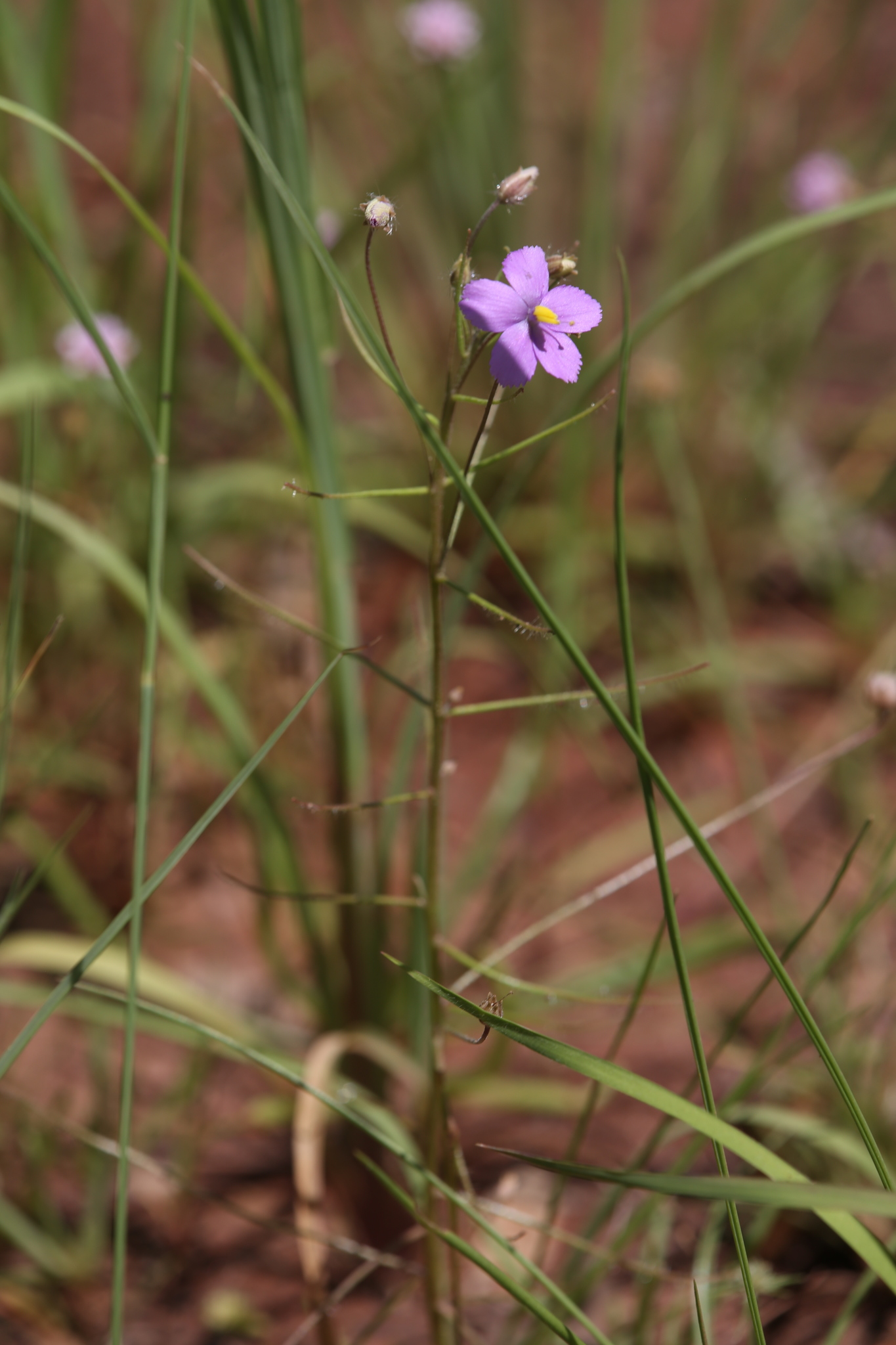

Conservation status
- Least Concern (IUCN 3.1)

Scientific classification
- Kingdom: Plantae
- Clade: Tracheophytes
- Clade: Angiosperms
- Clade: Eudicots
- Clade: Asterids
- Order: Lamiales
- Family: Byblidaceae
- Genus: Byblis
- Species: B. rorida

Binomial name
- Byblis rorida Lowrie & Conran (1998)

= Byblis rorida =

Species of carnivorous plant

Byblis rorida is a species of carnivorous plant in the Byblidaceae family that is endemic to Australia.

They have surfaces covered in glandular hairs, which can capture and also digest small insects. They are annuals with fibrous roots, at the end of the dry season the plants die back. Relying on seed to grow in the next wet season.

Smut fungus Yelsemia lowrieana (in the family Melanotaeniaceae) was found on a species of plant on the shores of Lake Campion near the town of Mukinbudin.
