= Shire of Nungarin =

Coordinates: 31°11′13″S 118°06′04″E

- Local government area
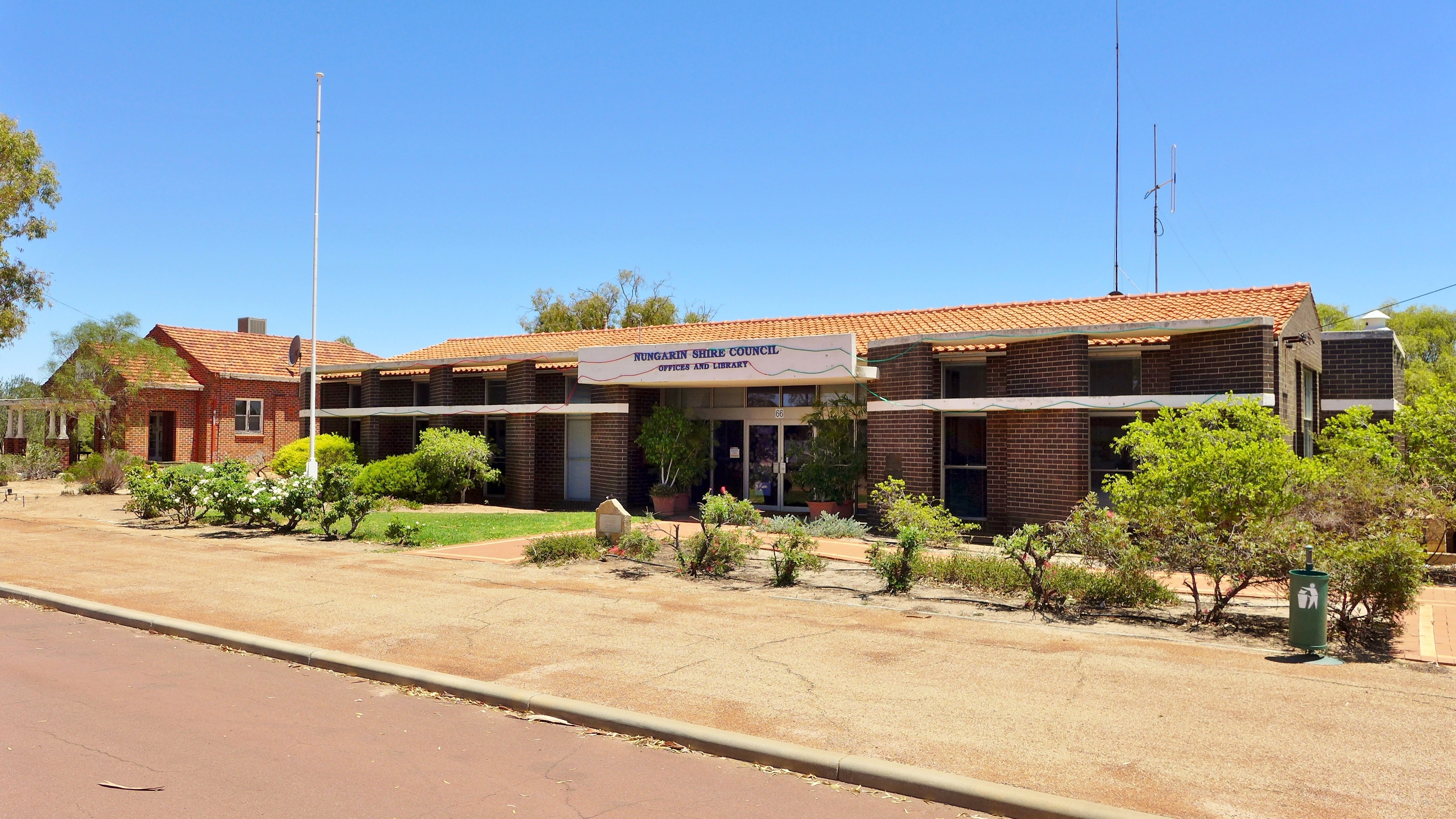
- Nungarin shire offices, 2014
- Interactive map of Shire of Nungarin
- Country: Australia
- State: Western Australia
- Region: Wheatbelt
- Established: 1921
- Council seat: Nungarin

Government
  - Shire President: Pippa de Lacy
  - State electorate: Central Wheatbelt
  - Federal division: Durack

Area
  - Total: 1,163.8 km^{2} (449.3 sq mi)

Population
  - Total: 255 (LGA 2021)
- Website: Shire of Nungarin
LGAs around Shire of Nungarin
Mount Marshall	Mukinbudin	Mukinbudin
Trayning	Shire of Nungarin	Merredin
Kellerberrin	Merredin	Merredin

The Shire of Nungarin is a local government area in the Wheatbelt region of Western Australia, and with a population of 255 as of the 2021 census, is one of the nation's least populous. It is located about 40 kilometres (25 mi) north of Merredin and about 300 kilometres (186 mi) east of the state capital, Perth. The Shire covers an area of 1,164 square kilometres (449 sq mi), and its seat of government is the town of Nungarin.

== History ==
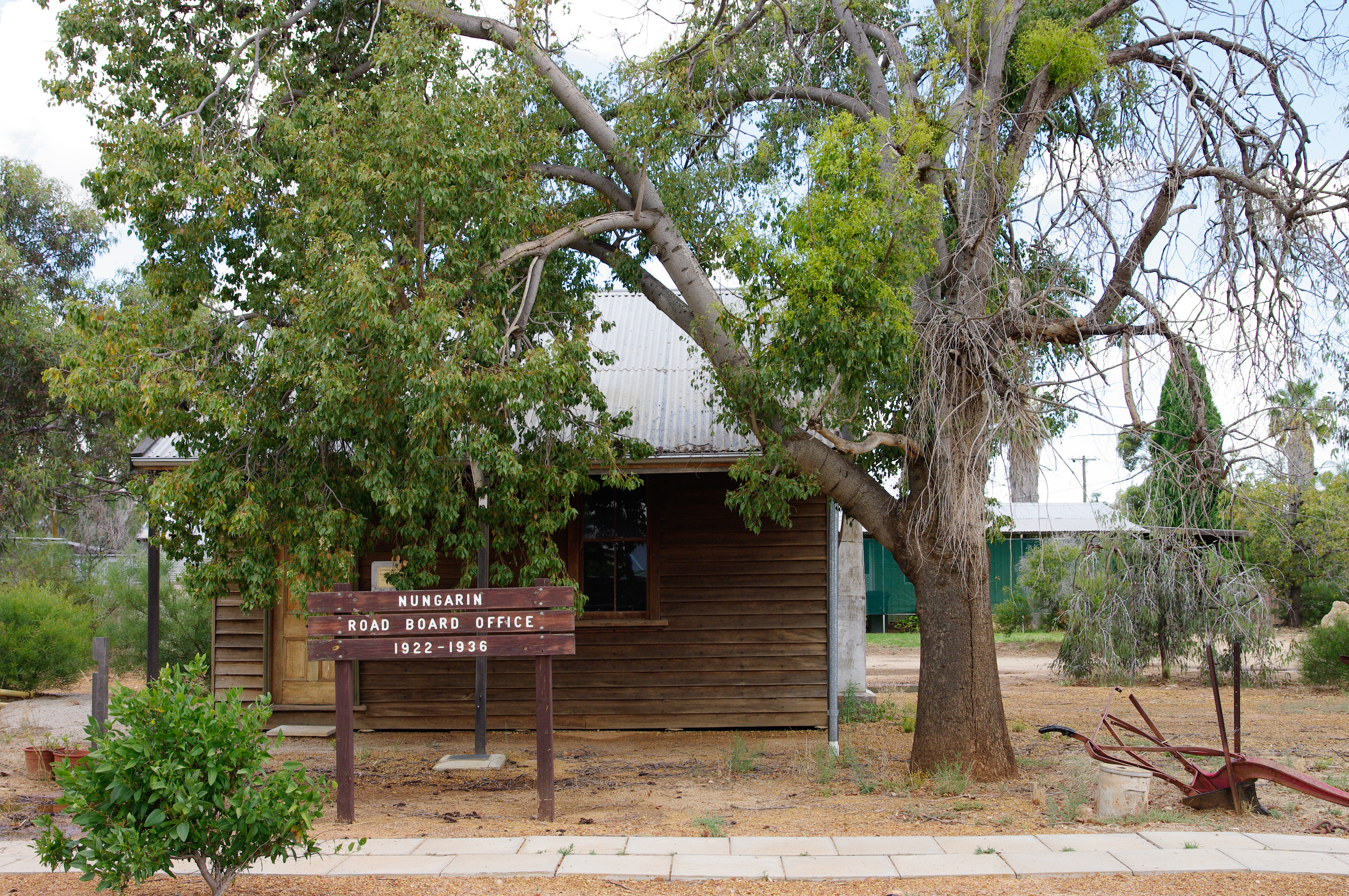
Nungarin road board offices 1922-1936

Initially, Nungarin was governed by the Kellerberrin Road Board. In 1911, responsibility for the area was transferred to the Merredin Road Board.

The Shire of Nungarin originated as the Nungarin Road District, which was gazetted on 24 March 1921. It was originally much larger, extending north into what is now the Shire of Mount Marshall until losing a section to that road board on 6 July 1923.

In 1933, it included the Bonnie Rock, Campion, Lake Brown, Mukinbudin, and Wilgoyne districts, with an area of 1708 square miles. In that year, it faced pressure to relocate the board seat to Mukinbudin as a more central location; however, instead, the Nungarin Road District was split into two and the Mukinbudin Road District formed on 1 September 1933, resulting in the Nungarin District losing over three-quarters of its land area.

On 1 July 1961, it became the Shire of Nungarin under the Local Government Act 1960, which reformed all remaining road districts into shires.

== Wards ==
The Shire has been divided into 3 wards. Prior to the elections in May 2003, there were 7 wards.

- Central Ward (3 councillors)
- Kwelkan/Danberrin/Elabbin Ward (2 councillors)
- Mangowine/Campion/Knungajin Ward (2 councillors)

== Towns and localities ==
The towns and localities of the Shire of Nungarin with population and size figures based on the most recent Australian census:

Locality	Population	Area	Map
Burran Rock	22 (SAL 2021)	169.4 km^{2} (65.4 sq mi)	
Chandler	18 (SAL 2021)	287.4 km^{2} (111.0 sq mi)	
Elabbin	22 (SAL 2021)	129.3 km^{2} (49.9 sq mi)	
Kwelkan	10 (SAL 2021)	57.3 km^{2} (22.1 sq mi)	
Nungarin	152 (SAL 2021)	351.3 km^{2} (135.6 sq mi)	
Talgomine	25 (SAL 2021)	171.1 km^{2} (66.1 sq mi)	

== Heritage-listed places ==
As of 2023, 64 places are heritage-listed in the Shire of Nungarin, of which eight are on the State Register of Heritage Places, among them the Mangowine Homestead.
