= Nungarin Army Vehicle Workshop =

Army Vehicle Workshop

General information
- Type: Heritage listed building
- Location: Second Avenue, Nungarin, Western Australia
- Coordinates: 31.1856°S 118.0971°E
- Completed: 1942
- Owner: Shire of Nungarin

Western Australia Heritage Register
- Type: State Registered Place
- Designated: 5 November 1999
- Reference no.: 3482

The Nungarin Army Vehicle Workshop is a heritage listed building in Nungarin, Western Australia currently operating as the Nungarin Heritage Machinery & Army Museum.

== History ==
The Nungarin Army Vehicle Workshop was built by the Australian Army in 1942 for World War II. It was part of the No.5 Base Ordnance Depot. The frame of the building was prefabricated in Perth and transported to Nungarin, unusual for a building of this size and materials.

After World War II, the building was sold to the Shire of Nungarin along with the rest of the base. The building is now the largest and most significant remnant of the Base Ordinance Depot. It is now home to the Nungarin Heritage Machinery and Army Museum.

== Description ==
The building is one of the largest timber clad buildings in the southern hemisphere.
