= Jane Swain Adams =

Australian pioneer, settler, farmer, inn-keeper

Jane Swain Adams (28 February 1851 – 9 November 1934) was an Australian farmer who built the Mangowine Homestead with her husband.

== Biography ==
Adams was born in Toodyay, Western Australia on 28 February 1851, the second of four children of Scottish-born farmer Charles and his wife Jane Mary (née Cameron) Glass. A young Jane Adams married cobbler Charles Frederick Adams on 6 November 1868.

The Adams originally established a farm at Yarragin, then in 1875 they moved to Mangowine, near Nungarin – the furthermost east of any settler at that time – where they built the Mangowine Homestead. In 1887 Adams commenced keeping meteorological records, a task she continued until her death in 1934. With the discovery of gold at Yilgarn in 1888, Charles built an inn at the homestead, which Jane ran until Mangowine was bypassed by the rail line from Northam to Southern Cross. They closed the inn in 1893. Charles died in 1895, and Jane continued to run the farm providing fresh produce for travellers and railway workers. She successfully tendered for the mail run in 1896, with their son Charles as the mail man.

In early 1900s more settlers took up farming in the region; many of these people were inexperienced in farming the tough conditions, and they turned to Adams for help and advice. The town of Nungarin was established in 1910. In 1929 Adams was the guest of honour for the opening of the Barbalin Water Scheme. Adams died on 9 November 1934 at Mangowine, and was buried in the Nungarin Cemetery. In 1935 a memorial was erected in her memory.

Adams was inducted into the Royal Agricultural Society of Western Australia's "Agricultural Hall of Fame" in 2003.
