= Lake Brown, Western Australia =

Locality in Western Australia

Lake Brown
- Town
- Interactive map of Lake Brown
- Coordinates: 30.9720°S 118.3696°E
- Country: Australia
- State: Western Australia
- LGA: Shire of Mukinbudin

Government
  - State electorate: Central Wheatbelt
  - Federal division: Durack

Area
  - Total: 258.3 km^{2} (99.7 sq mi)

Population
  - Total: 13 (SAL 2016)
- Postcode: 6479

Lake Brown is a rural locality in the Wheatbelt region of Western Australia, situated in the Shire of Mukinbudin approximately 57 kilometres (35 mi) north of Merredin and approximately 260 kilometres (160 mi) east-north-east of Perth.

== History ==
Lake Brown is the largest of a series of intermittent lakes in the area. It was surveyed by John Septimus Roe in 1836 and named after Colonial Secretary Peter Broun. The present locality of Lake Brown does not include the lake of the same name, which is located in the neighbouring Shire of Nungarin.

By 1910, 60,000 acres (24,000 ha) of land were open for selection at Lake Brown. In the 1920s Lake Brown was the site of a soldier settlement scheme.

The Wyalkatchem to Mukinbudin railway line was extended to Lake Brown from Mount Marshall in 1923, and Lake Brown was the site of the turning triangle until 1930 when it was moved to Mukinbudin. The railway siding was originally named Kalkalling, but was renamed in 1926 at the request of local residents.

Lake Brown was originally part of the Nungarin Road District, but was moved to the new Mukinbudin Road District in 1933. A willy-willy in January 1934 destroyed the local hall and damaged a number of sheds and houses in Lake Brown. In the 1930s the district had its own branches of the Returned and Services League, the Country Women's Association, and the Wheatgrowers' Union of Western Australia.
