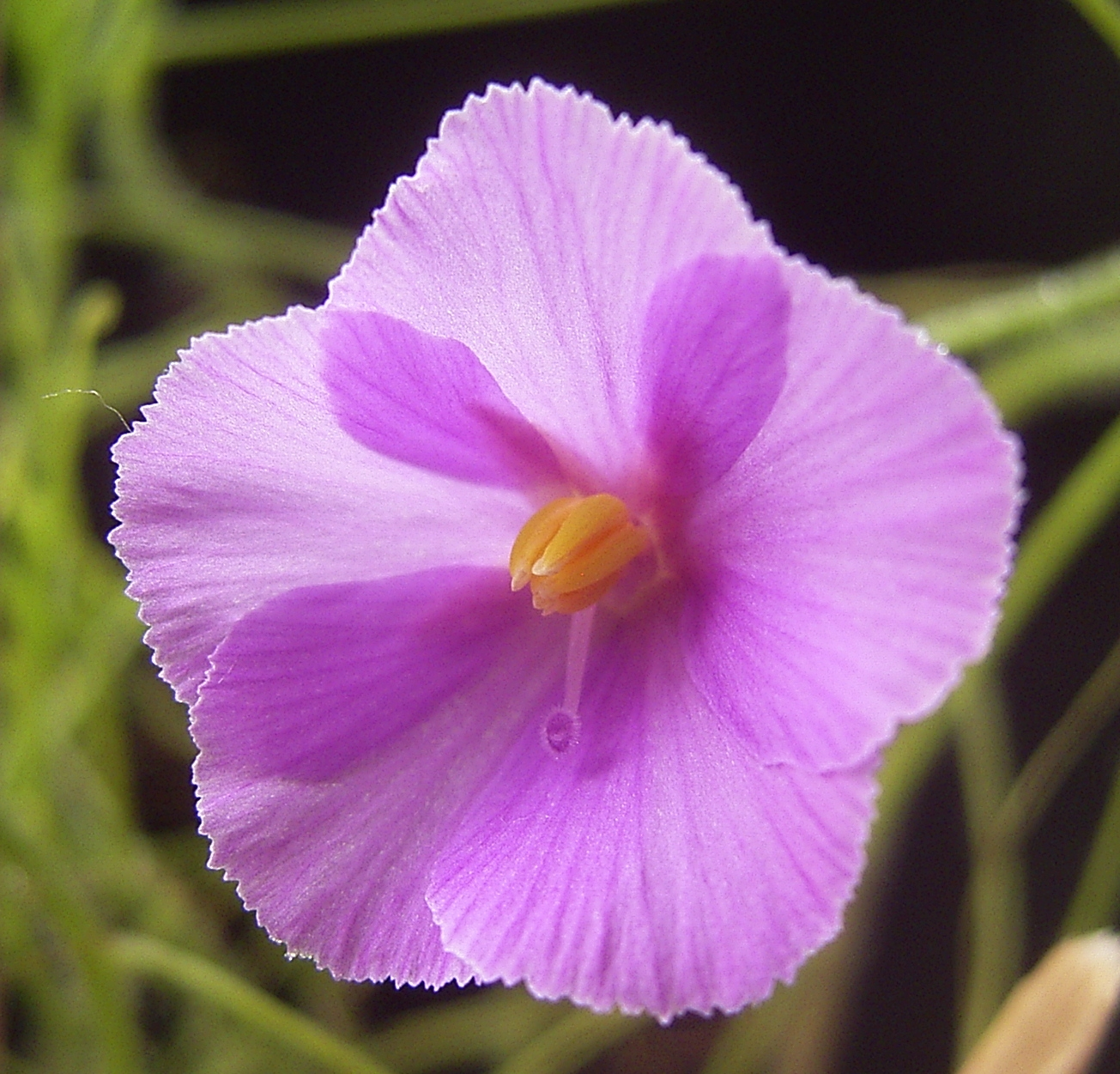

Conservation status
- Least Concern (IUCN 3.1)

Scientific classification
- Kingdom: Plantae
- Clade: Tracheophytes
- Clade: Angiosperms
- Clade: Eudicots
- Clade: Asterids
- Order: Lamiales
- Family: Byblidaceae
- Genus: Byblis
- Species: B. filifolia

Binomial name
- Byblis filifolia Planch. (1848)

Synonyms
- Byblis liniflora subsp. occidentalis Conran & Lowrie (1993)

= Byblis filifolia =

Species of carnivorous plant

Byblis filifolia is a species of plant in the Byblidaceae family. It is endemic to Australia.
