= Jan Adams =

Jan Adams may refer to:

- Jan Adams (diplomat) (born 1963), Australian diplomat
- Jan Adams (surgeon) (born 1954), American surgeon, author, and television presenter
