= Chandler, Western Australia =

Chandler
- Town
- Coordinates: 31.1°S 118.417°E
- Country: Australia
- State: Western Australia
- LGA(s): Shire of Nungarin
- Location: 303 km (188 mi) east of Perth; 47 km (29 mi) NNE of Merredin
- Established: 1943

Government
  - State electorate(s): Central Wheatbelt
  - Federal division(s): Durack

Area
  - Total: 287.4 km^{2} (111.0 sq mi)
- Elevation: 296 m (971 ft)

Population
  - Total(s): 18 (SAL 2021)
- Postcode: 6490

Chandler is a rural locality between Merredin and Mukinbudin in the Wheatbelt region of Western Australia. It had a population of 104 at the 2006 census.

Initially established to serve the nearby alunite (a source of potash) mine at nearby Lake Campion, land was set aside in 1942 for a townsite. Lots were surveyed soon afterward and the town was gazetted in 1943. The mine was a state government project with government employees that was needed following the supplies of the mineral being cut off after the commencement of World War II. A potash works was erected in the town reserve in 1943.

Following the war, the government closed down the plant once supply of Alunite had normalised. The company, Australian Plaster Industries, then took up a lease in the area and in 1949 commenced production of gypsum that is used in the manufacture of plaster of paris and plasterboard. During that time, the town boomed and had two main streets, over 70 houses, a telephone exchange, a school and powerhouse. Production ceased in 1952; the entire town was sold off in 1953.

The name of the town was chosen to honour Mr J Chandler, a farmer, who had discovered the alunite deposits.
