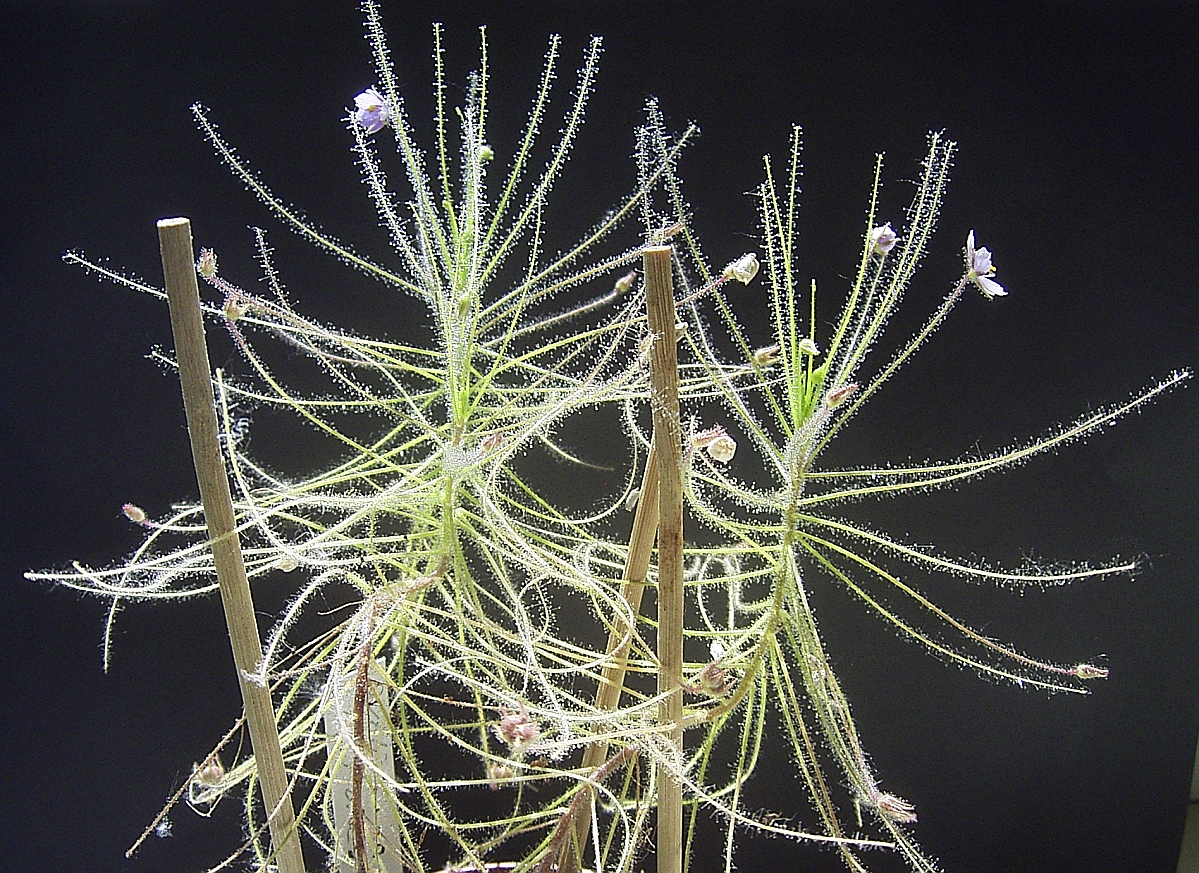
- Byblis liniflora

Scientific classification
- Kingdom: Plantae
- Clade: Embryophytes
- Clade: Tracheophytes
- Clade: Spermatophytes
- Clade: Angiosperms
- Clade: Eudicots
- Clade: Asterids
- Order: Lamiales
- Family: Byblidaceae; Domin
- Genus: Byblis; Salisb.

= Byblis (plant) =

Genus of carnivorous plants

Byblis (/ˈbɪblɪs/ BIB-liss) is a genus of carnivorous plants, sometimes termed the rainbow plants for the attractive appearance of their mucilage-covered leaves in bright sunshine. Native to Australia and New Guinea, it is the only genus in the family Byblidaceae. The first species in the genus was described by the English botanist Richard Anthony Salisbury in 1808. Eight species are now recognised.

Byblis species look very similar to Drosera and Drosophyllum, but are distinguished by their zygomorphic flowers, with five curved stamens off to one side of the pistil. These genera are in fact not closely related; modern classifications place Byblis in the Lamiales, while the sundews and Drosophyllum are now placed in the Caryophyllales.

== Plant characteristics ==
All species of the genus form upright growth supported by a weak, fibrous root system. The genus can be divided into two groups or "complexes": The B. liniflora complex and the B. gigantea complex.

=== Leaves ===
The leaves of all species are round in cross section and highly elongated, tapering at the end. The surface of the leaves is densely studded with glandular hairs which secrete a mucilaginous substance from their tip. These serve to attract small insects, which upon touching the sticky secretions are ensnared. Unless they are strong enough to escape, the insect prey either die of exhaustion or asphyxiate as the mucilage envelops them and clogs their spiracles.

Along with the stalked mucilaginous glands, the leaves are also equipped with sessile glands, which assumedly are responsible for the secretion of the digestive juices. Sessile glands are five to ten times as numerous as the stalked glands.

Byblis were previously grouped among the 'passive flypaper traps' along with Pinguicula, Drosophyllum, Roridula, Stylidium and Triphyophyllum peltatum as the plants were believed to be capable of moving neither their leaves nor tentacles to aid in prey capture or digestion. However, research in 2019 showed that the tentacles of Byblis liniflora collapse following exposure to food, bringing the prey item into contact with the sessile digestive glands. The same behaviour was later observed in B. gigantea.

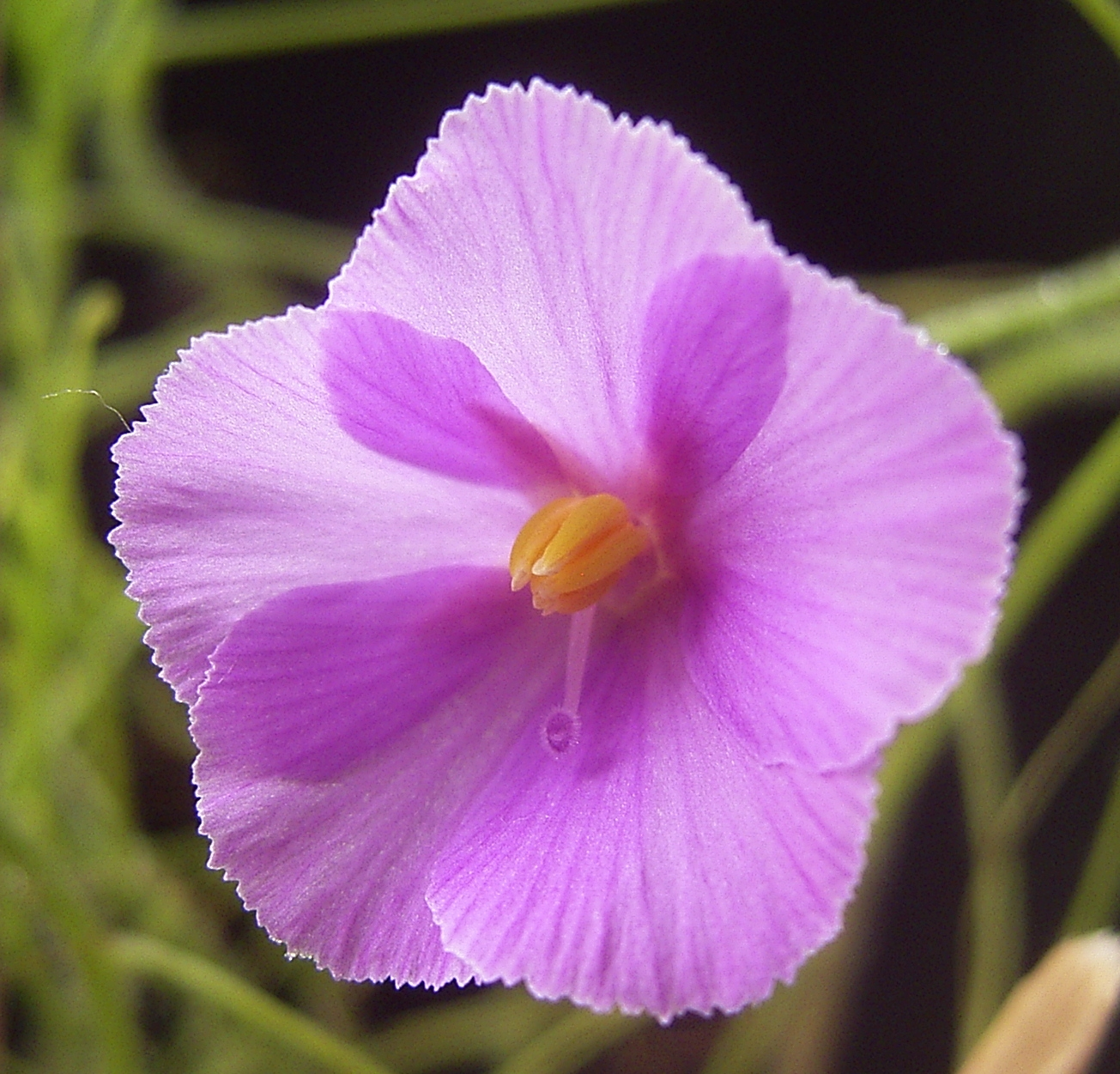
B. filifolia flower

=== Flowers ===
Flowers in this genus are borne singly at the end of unbranching, leaf-like inflorescences which emerge from the leaf axils. The five-petaled flowers are generally purple to pale violet, though B. gigantea and B. filifolia can sometimes produce white flowers. Except for the self-fertile B. liniflora, all species require pollen from other individuals for fertilization. The pollen release of B. gigantea and B. lamellata is only triggered by the resonance frequency of the wings of a landing pollinator, helping ensure cross-pollination with other individuals. The flowers of Byblis start to bloom in early spring and last until late summer.

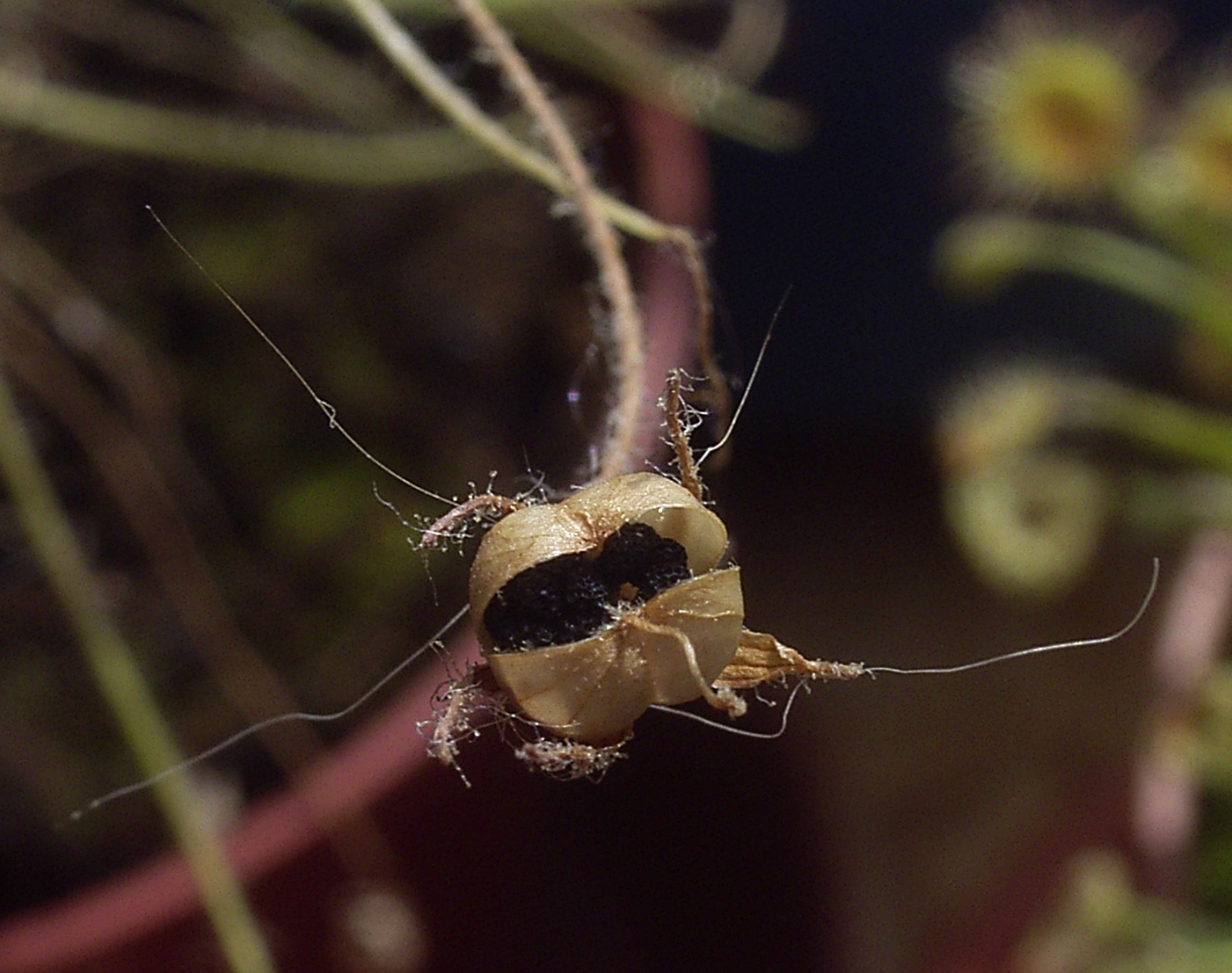
B. liniflora seed capsule

=== Fruit and seeds ===
Fertilized flowers mature to form an egg-shaped, two-parted seed capsule. As the seed capsule dries out it cracks open (dehisces), dropping the seed on the ground. The black seeds are generally round and often bear webbed surface markings, although those of B. lamellata are strongly ridged. The germination of many species is brought on by bush fires after the dry period; pyrogenic chemicals in the smoke are responsible for triggering germination.

== Distribution and habitat ==
Distribution of the genus

All Byblis species are native to Australia. B. gigantea and B. lamellata are endemic to the Perth region of southwest Australia, while the species making up the B. liniflora complex are found only in north Australia. The exception here is B. liniflora itself, whose distribution extends into southern Indonesia and Papua New Guinea.

Like many carnivorous plants, Byblis species usually grow in bogs and marshes. They generally prefer seasonally wet sandy soil in partial or direct sunlight with temperatures between ~ 5–40 °C (41–104 °F).

== Environmental status ==
As native plants of Australia, all Byblis species are protected. Until the year 2000, they were also given international protection under CITES appendix II, but were removed from the list when Australia entered the CITES agreement. Since then trade of the genus has been unregulated outside of Australia. However, due to the sensitivity of the plant, interest in the genus has been restricted to a small portion of the carnivorous plant hobbyist community. The majority of plant material sold today is produced in cultivation, with the annual B. filifolia and B. liniflora being the most common. Most of the other species must be grown from seed, which is often collected from the wild for this purpose.

The West Australian species B. gigantea und B. lamellata are being threatened by habitat destruction for urban sprawl from cities such as Perth. Particularly damaging is the draining of wet habitats to produce arable land. B. gigantea is on the International Union for Conservation of Nature's Red List of Threatened Species and is considered critically endangered.

== Carnivory ==
In their natural habitat, all species of Byblis have been observed playing host to live bugs of the genus Setocoris, which nourish themselves by eating prey caught by the plants. In 2005, direct digestion of insect prey by enzymes secreted by the sessile glands of B. filifolia and other members of this genus was confirmed. Soon thereafter similar results were found with B. liniflora.

== Systematics ==
Molecular genetics studies have placed the genus in the order Lamiales. While its placement within the order is still unclear, it is closely related to Martyniaceae, Lentibulariaceae as well as Gesneriaceae.

For a time, the genus Roridula was also assigned to the family Byblidaceae. Since that time, however, it has been placed into its own family, Roridulaceae.

Traditionally the genus was divided into only two species, namely B. gigantea and B. liniflora. Further species were described in the 1980s, particularly through the work of the Australian botanist Allen Lowrie. Eight species are currently recognised:

- Byblis aquatica (annual, scrambling stem up to 45 cm (18 in), semiaquatic habitats)
- Byblis filifolia (annual, up to 60 cm (24 in), anthers longer than filaments)
- Byblis gigantea (perennial, up to 70 cm (28 in), seeds with honeycomb pattern)
- Byblis guehoi
- Byblis lamellata (perennial, up to 45 cm (18 in), deeply ridged seeds)
- Byblis liniflora (annual, up to 15 cm (5.9 in), anthers shorter than filaments)
- Byblis pilbarana
- Byblis rorida (annual, up to 30 cm (12 in), heavily set with glandular tentacles)

== Subdivision of the genus ==
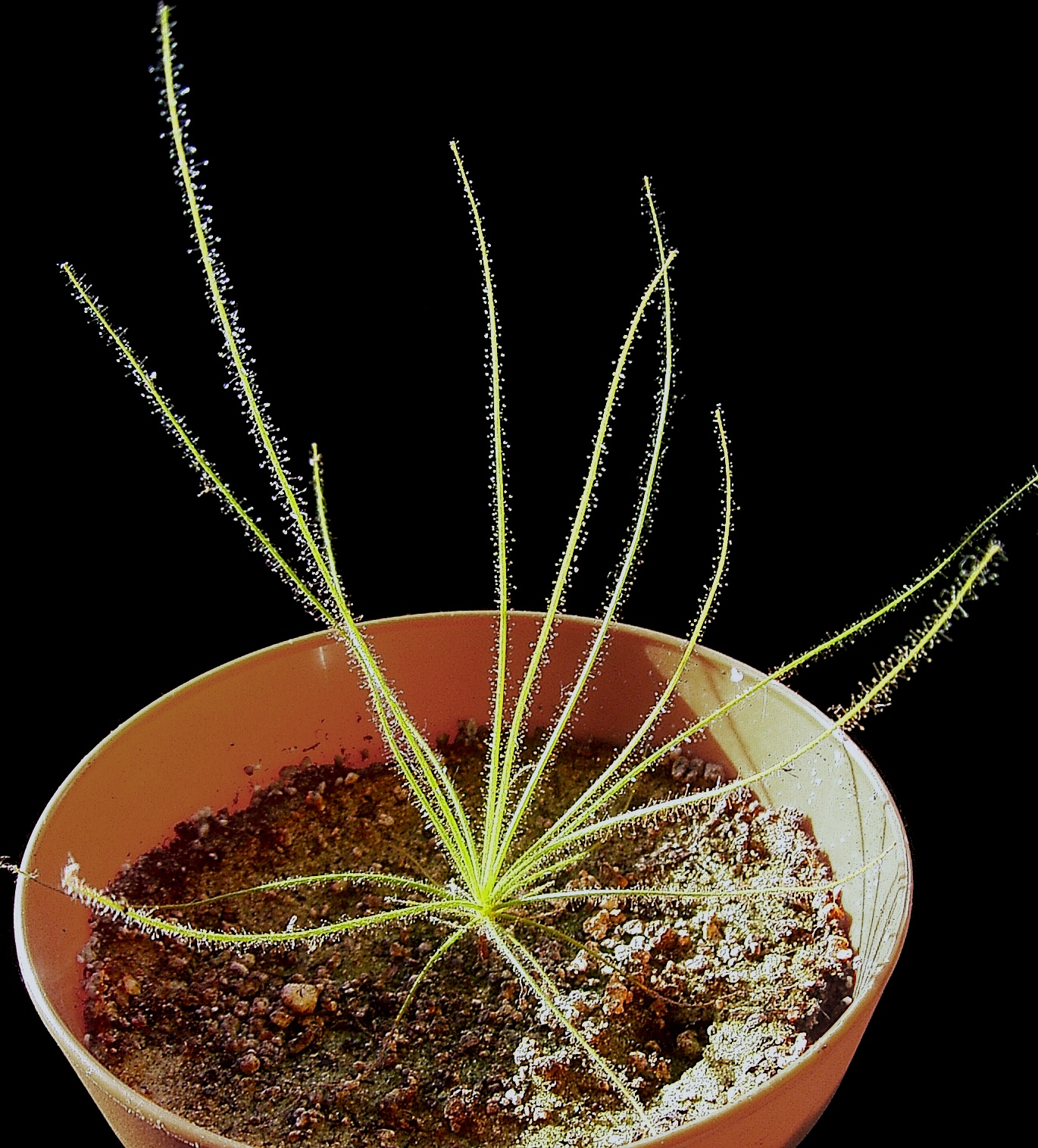
Byblis lamellata in cultivation

=== Byblis liniflora complex ===
The four species of this complex, B. liniflora, B. rorida, B. filifolia and B. aquatica, are annual herbaceous plants that reach a height of 15–50 cm (5.9–19.7 in) and a maximum leaf length of 4–15 cm (1.6–5.9 in). These species grow from seedlings to flowering plants in only a few months, setting seed and dying with the onset of the dry season. The original haploid chromosome count of this complex is x=8. The diploid number is therefore 2n=16, whereas the tetraploid species B. liniflora is 2n=32.

=== Byblis gigantea complex ===
The remaining two species, B. lamellata und B. gigantea, make up what is known as the B. gigantea complex. These perennial species are both endemic to Southwest Australia, and reach heights of 45–70 cm (18–28 in). Unlike the annual members of the B. liniflora complex, these species survive the dry season by dying back to an underground rhizome, out of which they emerge come fall. The leaves of this complex can reach 20 cm (7.9 in) in length. The base chromosome count of the complex is x=9; since both species are diploid, their chromosome count is 2n=18.

== Paleobotany ==
In the year 2004 a single fossil of a seed, resembling that of members of the modern day B. liniflora complex, was discovered in south Australia dating from the middle of the Eocene epoch. The species was assigned to the Byblidaceae as a parataxon of the genus. The sole specimen was unfortunately destroyed in a lab accident shortly after being photographed.

== Etymology ==
The Latin generic name "Byblis" originates from a goddess from Greek mythology, of whom Ovid wrote in his Metamorphoses (IX, l. 454–664). Byblis, niece of Apollo, fell deeply in love with her twin brother Caunus. At his rejection of her advances, she let forth an endless stream of glistening tears, eventually literally transforming into a spring. The droplets lining the leaves of the Byblis are said to resemble those tears.

The English vernacular name - "rainbow plants" - also denotes the mucilaginous droplets which, under the right lighting conditions and viewing angle, sparkle in a rainbow of colors.

== See also ==
- Carnivorous plants of Australia
