= Mangowine Homestead =

Historic homestead in Nungarin, Western Australia

- Location within Western Australia

General information
- Type: Station
- Location: Nungarin, Western Australia
- Coordinates: 31.04682°S 118.10453°E

Western Australia Heritage Register
- Designated: 28 June 1996
- Reference no.: 1923

Mangowine Homestead is an historic homestead in Nungarin, Western Australia, built by Charles Frederick and Jane Swain Adams. It comprises a cottage built c1876, and an adjacent building constructed in 1889 as an inn.

The property was given to the National Trust of Australia (WA) in 1968 by Olive Warwick (Charles and Jane's granddaughter). The Trust commenced restoration work in 1970, and opened the property to the public in 1973.
