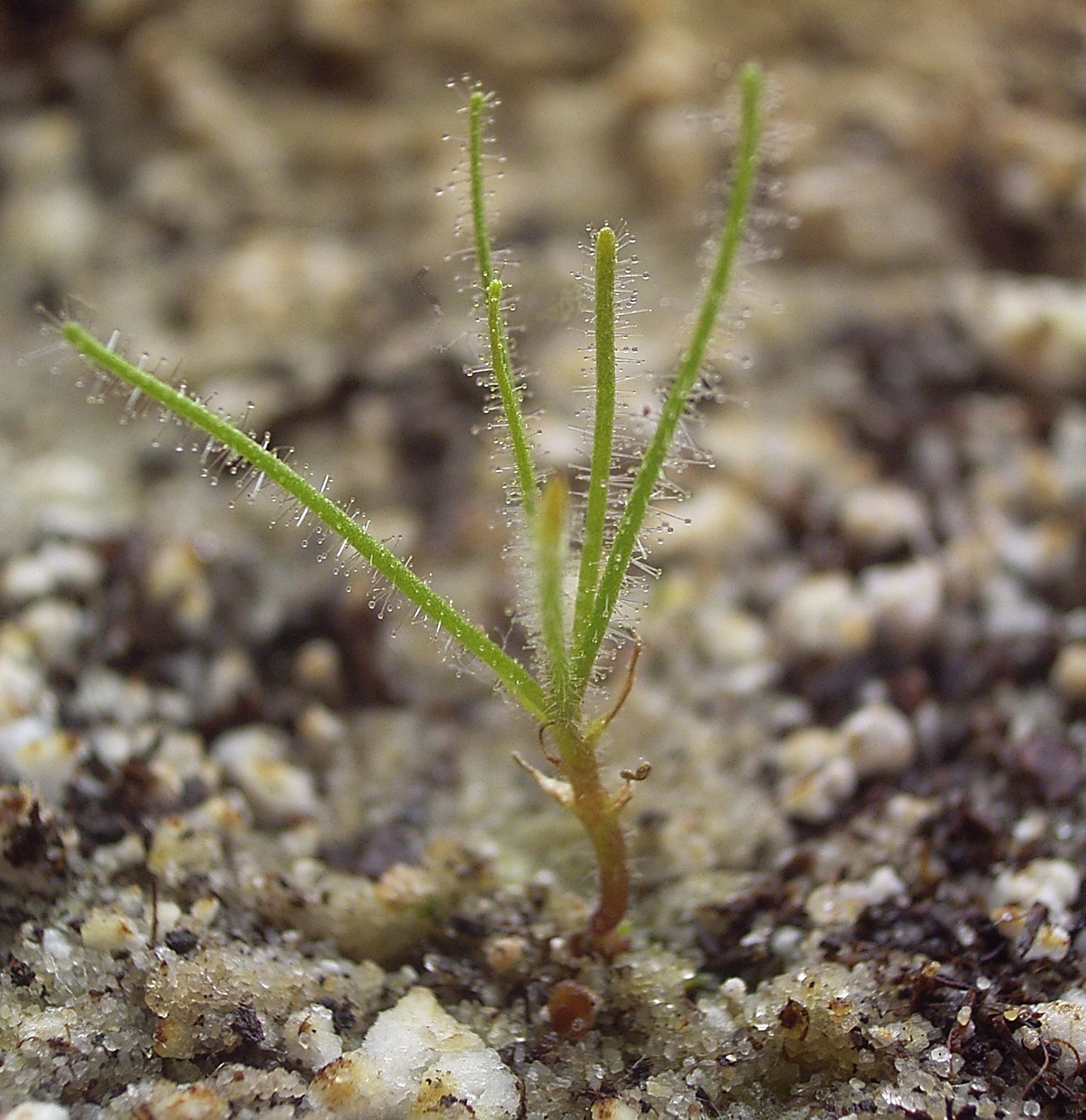

Conservation status
- Vulnerable (IUCN 3.1)

Scientific classification
- Kingdom: Plantae
- Clade: Tracheophytes
- Clade: Angiosperms
- Clade: Eudicots
- Clade: Asterids
- Order: Lamiales
- Family: Byblidaceae
- Genus: Byblis
- Species: B. lamellata

Binomial name
- Byblis lamellata Conran & Lowrie

= Byblis lamellata =

Species of carnivorous plant

Byblis lamellata is a carnivorous plant in the Byblidaceae family. It is endemic to Australia.
