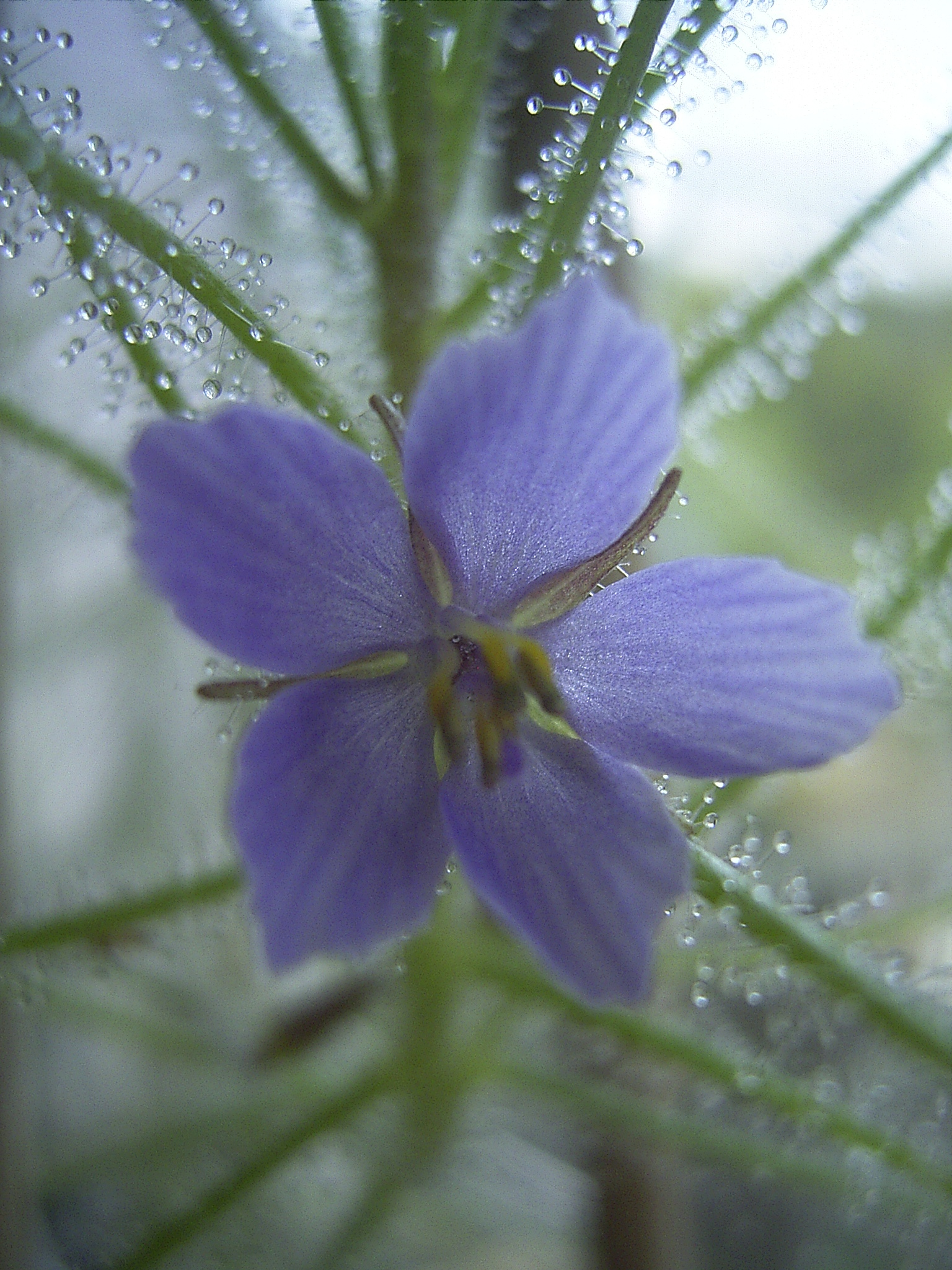

Conservation status
- Least Concern (IUCN 3.1)

Scientific classification
- Kingdom: Plantae
- Clade: Tracheophytes
- Clade: Angiosperms
- Clade: Eudicots
- Clade: Asterids
- Order: Lamiales
- Family: Byblidaceae
- Genus: Byblis
- Species: B. liniflora

Binomial name
- Byblis liniflora Salisb.

Synonyms
- Byblis caerulea R.Br. ex Planch.; ?Byblis icariflorum Hort.Dingley nom.nud.

= Byblis liniflora =

Species of plant

Byblis liniflora is a species of carnivorous plant in the family Byblidaceae. It is found in Australia, Indonesia, and Papua New Guinea.

Byblis liniflora contains acteoside (verbascoside) as do many other Lamiales.
