= Nungarin, Western Australia =

Nungarin
- Town
- Interactive map of Nungarin
- Coordinates: 31.187°S 118.101°E
- Country: Australia
- State: Western Australia
- LGA: Shire of Nungarin
- Location: 278 km (173 mi) ENE of Perth; 39 km (24 mi) N of Merredin; 40 km (25 mi) S of Mukinbudin
- Established: 1910s

Government
  - State electorate: Central Wheatbelt
  - Federal division: Durack

Area
  - Total: 351.3 km^{2} (135.6 sq mi)
- Elevation: 296 m (971 ft)

Population
  - Total: 152 (SAL 2021)
- Postcode: 6490

Nungarin is a town in the north east of the Wheatbelt region of Western Australia, approximately 278 kilometres (173 mi) east of Perth and 39 kilometres (24 mi) north of Merredin. It is the main town in the Shire of Nungarin. At the 2006 census, Nungarin had a population of 142.

The surrounding areas produce wheat and other cereal crops. The town is a receival site for Cooperative Bulk Handling.

== History ==
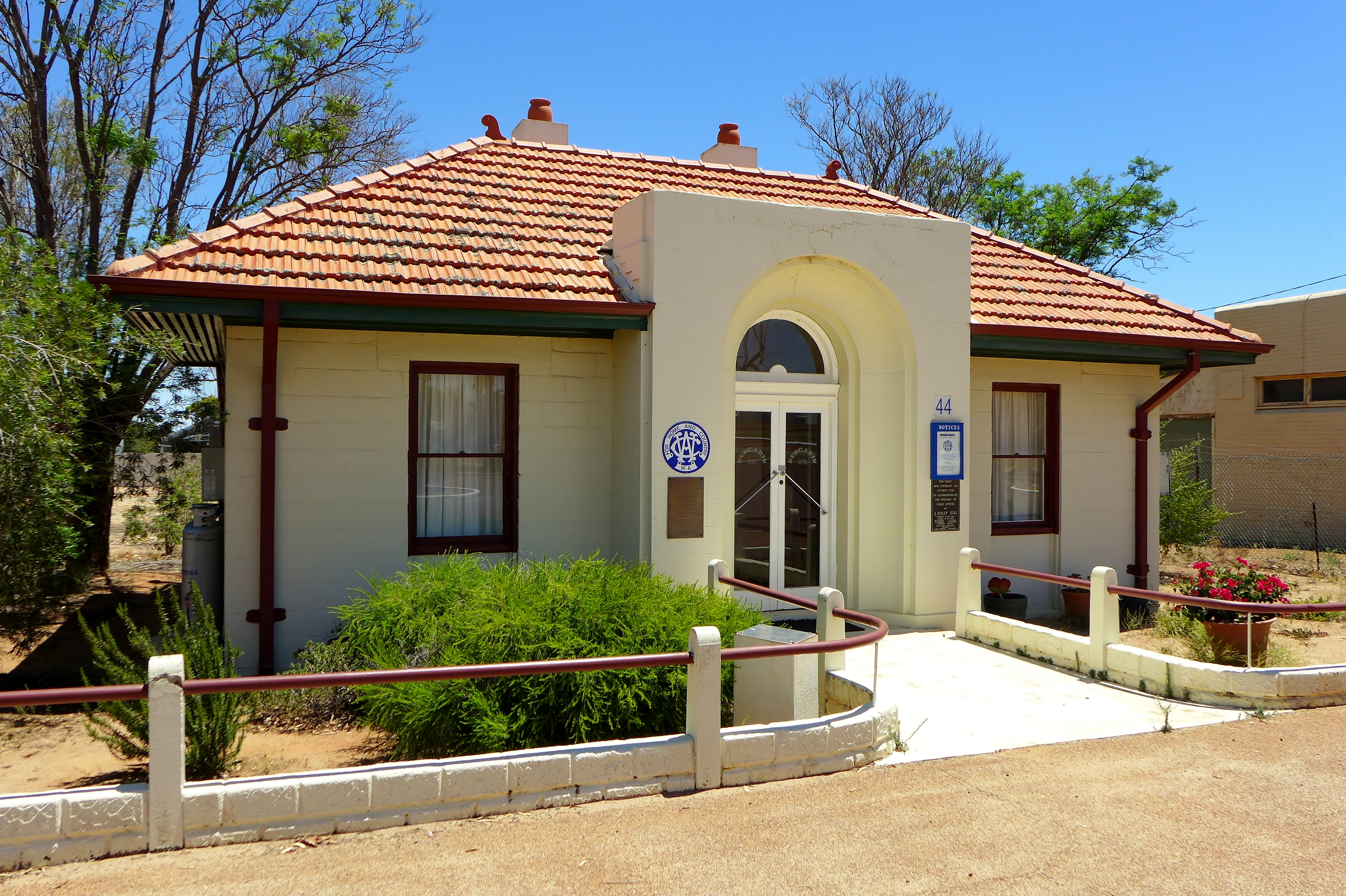
Alice Williams Memorial Building in Nungarin

In October 1910, 601 hectares (1,486 acres) at Avon Location 14227 and 14230 were set aside as a townsite reserve along the Dowerin to Merredin railway line.

The townsite itself was gazetted in 1912. The local hall was being built in 1919, and was open by the following year.

A large fire in 1922 destroyed Messrs Thomas and Thick's store along with the post office branch and the manager's residence of the Nungarin Farmers Cooperative Society. It was not known what caused the fire, which caused damage estimated at £A 12,000, equivalent to A$1.12 million in 2022. The Farmers Cooperative reopened in the hall and the post office moved to the station building.

In 1932 the Wheat Pool of Western Australia announced that the town would have two grain elevators, each fitted with an engine, installed at the railway siding. Construction of the bins for the bulk handling of wheat commenced late in 1933 with 30 men employed to complete the work.

=== Army Camp ===
During World War II it was an important army ordnance camp – 5 Base Ordnance Depot was established at the Nungarin Army Depot and Workshop. The site for the Army Depot was apparently selected as it was outside the range of Japanese carrier-based aircraft, and was readily accessible by the rail network.

In 1946 a number of fires damaged army property.

In the post-war era it was a site of large disposal sales. The former army camp is now the site of the Nungarin Heritage Machinery and Army Museum. The former Nungarin railway station building has been relocated to the Bennett Brook Railway at Whiteman Park in Perth.

=== Newspapers ===
Local newspapers included:

- Nungarin Trayning Mail and Kununoppin Advertiser (1917–1922)
- Nungarin Standard (1934-1939)
- Dampier Herald and Nungarin Standard (1943-1958)

== Politics ==
Nungarin vote counts in state and federal elections

2004 federal election Source: AEC
Liberal	46.3%
The Nationals	34.7%
Labor	9.47%
One Nation	4.21%
Greens	3.16%

2005 state election Source: WAEC
The Nationals	59.8%
Liberal	13.7%
Labor	13.7%
New Country	6.86%
One Nation	3.92%

2001 federal election Source: AEC
Liberal	52.2%
The Nationals	17.9%
One Nation	14.9%
Labor	10.5%
Democrats	1.49%

2001 state election Source: WAEC
The Nationals	61.5%
One Nation	20.0%
Labor	12.3%
Independent	3.08%
Greens	2.31%

1998 federal election Source: AEC
Liberal	50.8%
The Nationals	23.8%
One Nation	12.3%
Labor	6.56%
Democrats	3.28%

1996 state election Source: WAEC
The Nationals	86.6%
Labor	13.4%
