= Mukinbudin, Western Australia =

Town in the Wheatbelt, Western Australia

Mukinbudin
- Town
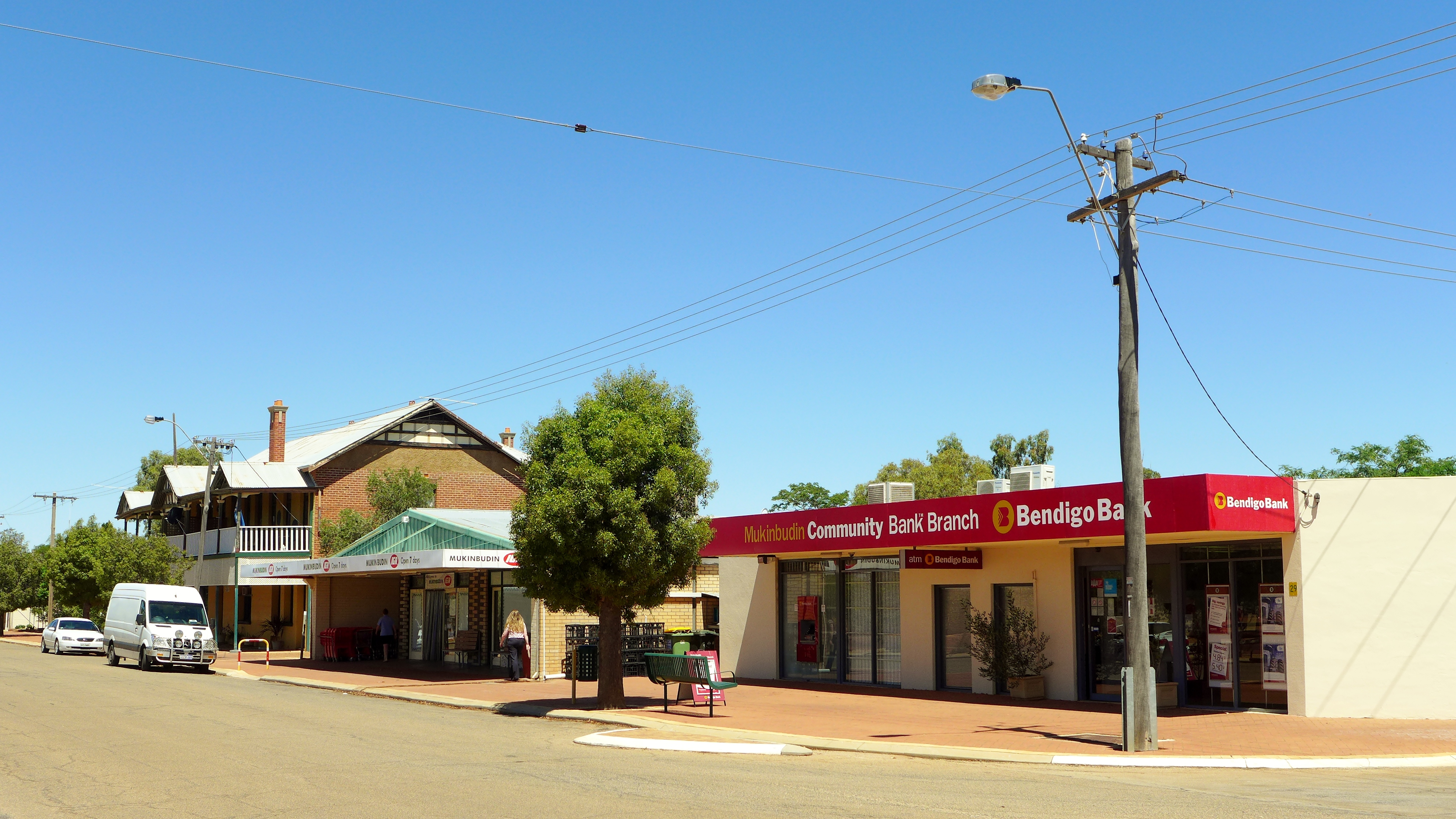
- Shadbolt Street, Mukinbudin, 2014

- Interactive map of Mukinbudin
- Coordinates: 30°54′50″S 118°12′25″E
- Country: Australia
- State: Western Australia
- LGA: Shire of Mukinbudin
- Location: 293 km (182 mi) ENE of Perth; 80 km (50 mi) N of Merredin
- Established: 1920s

Government
  - State electorate: Central Wheatbelt
  - Federal division: Durack

Area
  - Total: 227.7 km^{2} (87.9 sq mi)
- Elevation: 314 m (1,030 ft)

Population
  - Total: 284 (UCL 2021)
- Postcode: 6479

Mukinbudin is a small town in the north eastern Wheatbelt region of Western Australia, approximately 298 kilometres (185 mi) east of Perth and 80 kilometres (50 mi) north of Merredin near Lake Campion. It is the main town in the Shire of Mukinbudin. At the 2021 Australian census, Mukinbudin had a population of 336.

The present Shire of Mukinbudin was settled by pastoralists who in the 1870s took up large leases in excess of 20,000 acres (81 km^{2}) to run sheep and by sandalwood cutters and miners en route to the goldfields. In 1910 the first of the farmers arrived to commence wheat growing on their 1,000-acre (4 km^{2}) blocks and it was some time before they added stock to what had been entirely a wheat growing enterprise. An extension of the Mount Marshall railway line to Mukinbudin and Lake Brown was approved in 1922 and opened in October 1923. The town site was gazetted in 1922.

In 1932 the Wheat Pool of Western Australia announced that the town would have two grain elevators, each fitted with an engine, installed at the railway siding.

The surrounding areas produce wheat and other cereal crops. The town is a receival site for Cooperative Bulk Handling.

The town was hit by a wild storm in February 2011 and was lashed by strong winds with gusts over 125 km/h, large hailstones and experienced some flooding. Dozens of power poles and hundreds of trees were blown over and parts of roads were washed away.

== Politics ==
Polling place statistics are shown below showing the votes from Mukinbudin in the federal and state elections as indicated.

2007 federal election Source: AEC
Liberal	44.1%
The Nationals	26.3%
CDP	17.4%
Labor	6.58%
Family First	1.32%

2008 state election Source: WAEC
The Nationals	66.8%
CDP	18.4%
Liberal	15.4%
Labor	2.75%
Greens	1.65%

2004 federal election Source: AEC
Liberal	46.0%
The Nationals	23.4%
CDP	16.6%
Labor	6.42%
One Nation	4.53%

2005 state election Source: WAEC
The Nationals	60.9%
CDP	20.7%
Liberal	9.60%
Labor	3.41%
New Country	3.10%

2001 federal election Source: AEC
Liberal	60.7%
One Nation	12.0%
The Nationals	9.56%
CDP	8.20%
Labor	6.28%

2001 state election Source: WAEC
The Nationals	56.7%
One Nation	30.2%
Labor	7.92%
Independent	1.83%
Independent	1.83%

== Notable people ==
- Mark Seaby – AFL footballer
- Rowan Jones – AFL footballer
- Todd Menegola – AFL footballer
