= Leioproctus edentatus =

Scientific classification
- Kingdom: Animalia
- Phylum: Arthropoda
- Clade: Pancrustacea
- Class: Insecta
- Order: Hymenoptera
- Family: Colletidae
- Genus: Leioproctus
- Species: L. edentatus

Binomial name
- Leioproctus edentatus Batley, 2025

Species of bee

Leioproctus edentatus, or Leioproctus (Euryglossidia) edentatus, is a species of bee in the family Colletidae and subfamily Colletinae. It is endemic to Australia. It was described by entomologist Michael Batley in 2025.

== Etymology ==
The specific epithet edentatus (Latin: "toothless") is an anatomical reference to the absence of an inner tooth on the claws of the female.

== Description ==
The male body length is 6.0 mm, female body length 5.9 mm. Integumental colouration is mainly black, with the metasoma brown. The hair is white and brown.

== Distribution and habitat ==
The species occurs in south-west Western Australia. The type locality is Glen Forrest.

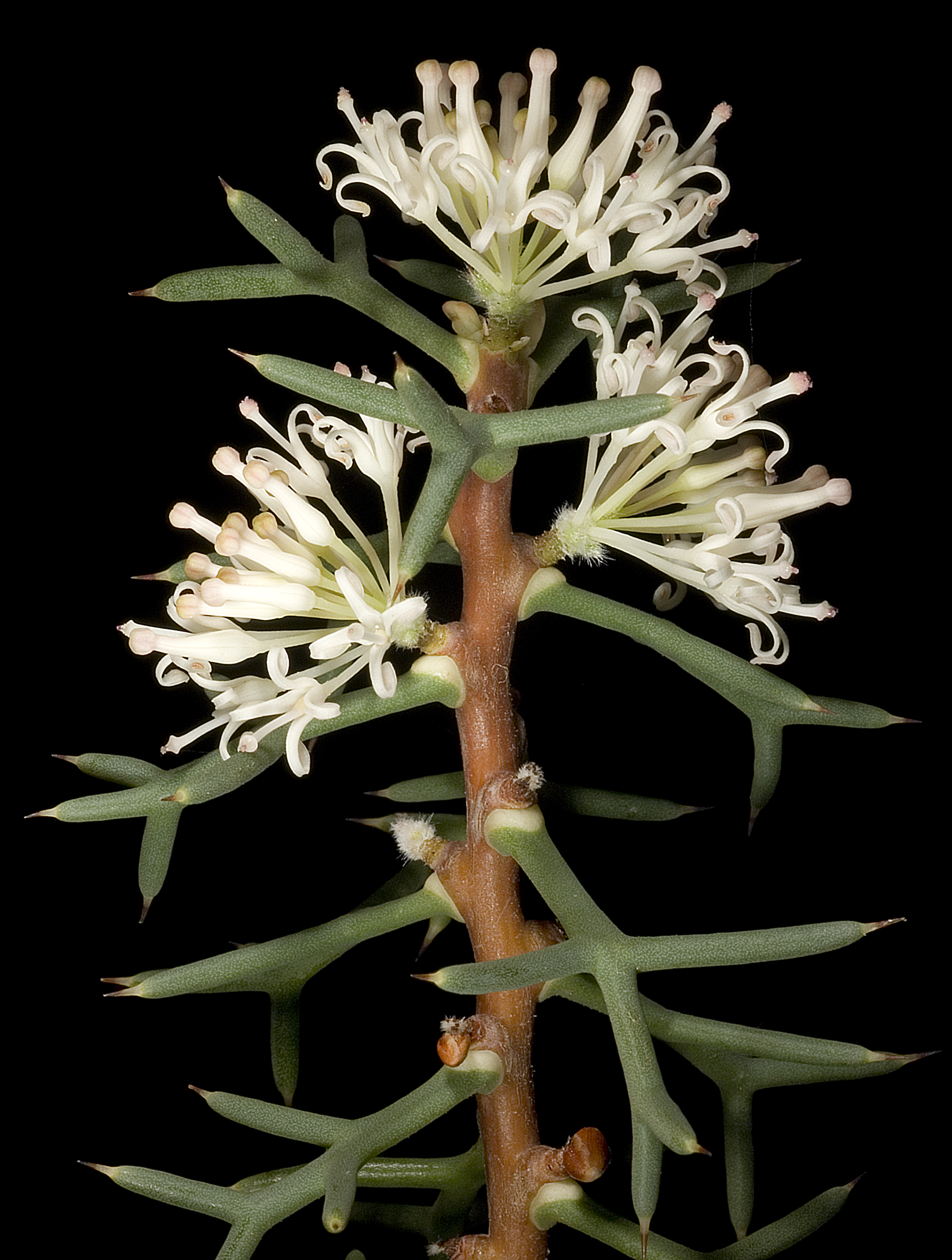
Flowers of Hakea lissocarpha (honey bush), a forage plant of the bees

== Behaviour ==
The adults are flying mellivores. Flowering plants visited by the bees include Hakea amplexicaulis and Hakea lissocarpha.

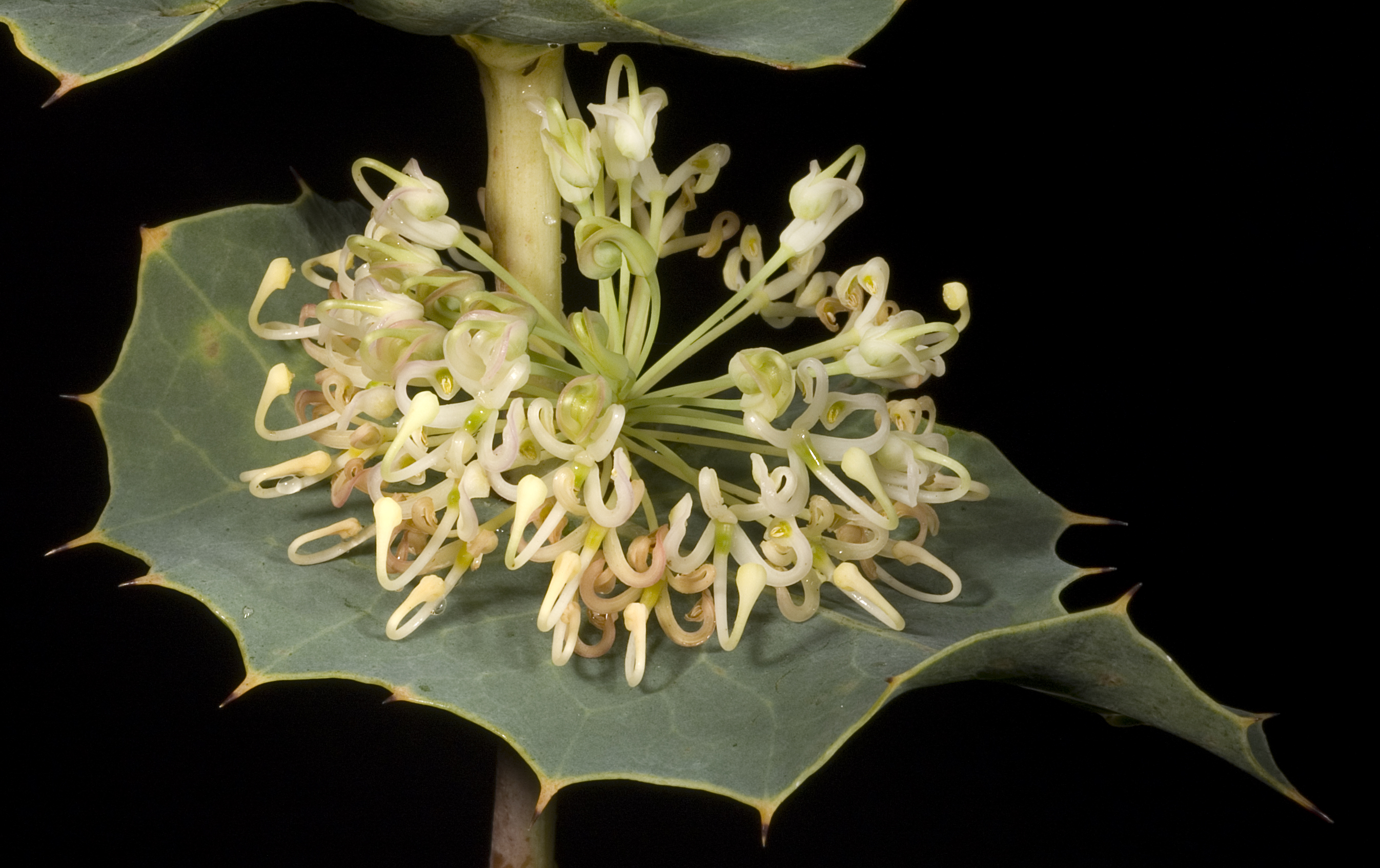
Flowers of Hakea amplexicaulis (prickly hakea), a forage plant of the bees
