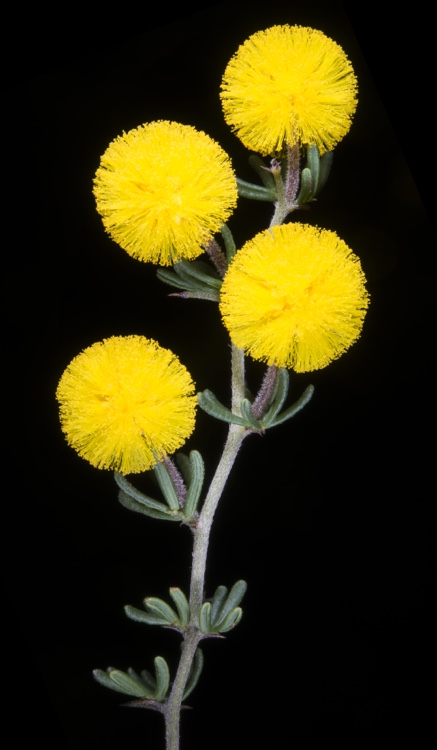
- Near Alderslyde

Conservation status
- Priority Three — Poorly Known Taxa (DEC)

Scientific classification
- Kingdom: Plantae
- Clade: Tracheophytes
- Clade: Angiosperms
- Clade: Eudicots
- Clade: Rosids
- Order: Fabales
- Family: Fabaceae
- Subfamily: Caesalpinioideae
- Clade: Mimosoid clade
- Genus: Acacia
- Species: A. anarthros

Binomial name
- Acacia anarthros Maslin
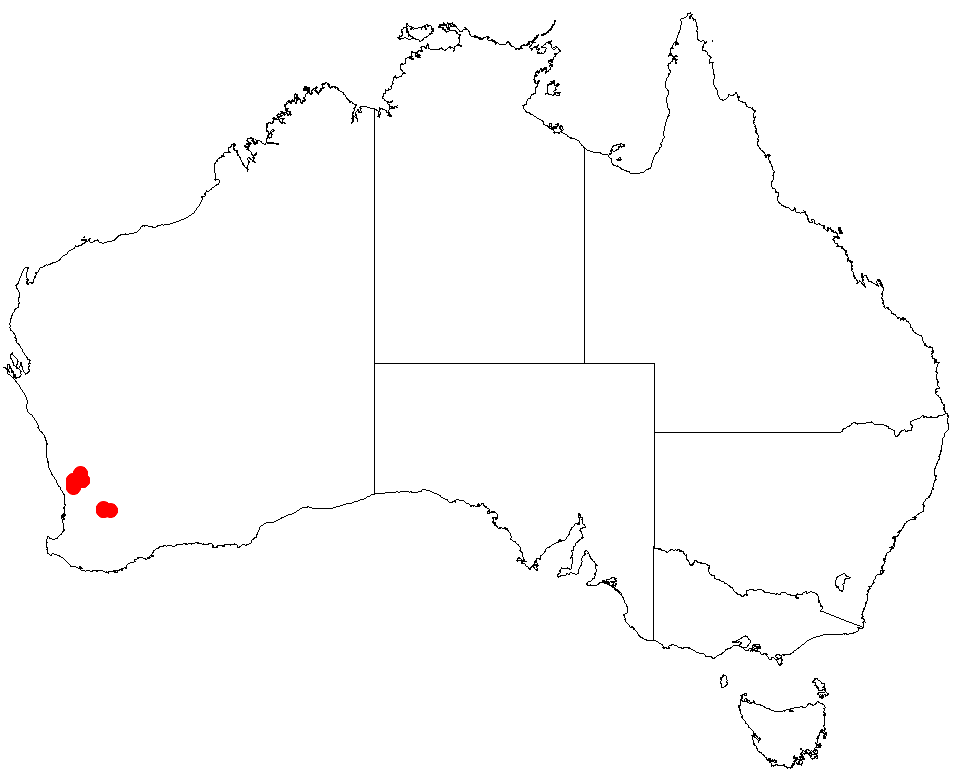
- Occurrence data from AVH

= Acacia anarthros =

Species of plant

Acacia anarthros is a species of flowering plant in the family Fabaceae and is endemic to the south-west of Western Australia. It is a shrub with bipinnate leaves with 1 leaflet, each with 2 or 3 pairs of pinnules, spherical heads of 14 to 17 flowers, and narrowly oblong pods up to about 60 mm (2.4 in) long.

== Description ==
Acacia anarthros is an erect or prostrate, spiny shrub that typically grows to a height of 10–50 cm (3.9–19.7 in) and has flexuous branchlets. Its leaves are bipinnate and sessile, with 1 pair of pinnae 2–5 mm (0.079–0.197 in) long, each with 2 to 3 pinnules 4–10 mm (0.16–0.39 in) long and 0.5–1.5 mm (0.020–0.059 in) wide with their edges rolled under. There are spiny stipules 3–7 mm (0.12–0.28 in) long at the base of the pinnae. The flowers are arranged in a single sperical head in axils on a peduncle 7–15 mm (0.28–0.59 in) long, each head with 14 to 16 golden-yellow flowers. Flowering occurs from June to September and the fruit is a narrowly oblong, crust-like and hairy pod about 60 mm (2.4 in) long and 5–8 mm (0.20–0.31 in) wide. The seeds are broadly elliptic to more or less round, 3–4 mm (0.12–0.16 in) long with a rough surface.

== Taxonomy ==
Acacia anarthros was first formally described in 1979 by the botanist Bruce Maslin in the journal Nuytsia, distinguishing in from the similar A. drewiana. The specific epithet (anarthros) means 'not differentiated', referring to the downward extending of the leaf axils.

== Distribution and habitat ==
This wattle has a limited range around New Norcia as a part of heathland or open Eucalyptus wandoo or Corymbia calophylla woodland communities, and sometimes in heath.

== Conservation status ==
Acacia anartoros is listed as "Priority three" by the Government of Western Australia Department of Biodiversity, Conservation and Attractions meaning that it is poorly known and known from only a few locations but is not under imminent threat.

== See also ==
- List of Acacia species
