= Brookton to Corrigin railway line =

Former railway line in Western Australia

Brookton to Corrigin railway
- The Brookton to Corrigin railway line

Overview
- Status: Closed
- Locale: Wheatbelt, Western Australia
- Termini: Brookton; Corrigin

Service
- Operator(s): Western Australian Government Railways

History
- Commenced: 1913
- Opened: 19 April 1915
- Closed: 1957

Technical
- Line length: 90 km (56 mi)
- Track gauge: 1,067 mm (3 ft 6 in)

Brookton to Corrigin railway (also known when under construction in 1913 as the Brookton to Kunjinn railway) was a railway line in the Wheatbelt region of Western Australia, between Brookton and Corrigin.

The planning and opening were significant events in the districts affected.

== History ==
The Brookton–Kunjinn Railway Act 1911, an act by the Parliament of Western Australia granted assent on 16 February 1911, authorised the construction of the railway line from Brookton to Kunjinn.

When the line was opened in 1915, it was 55 miles 75 chains in length. It was constructed by the Public Works Department (Western Australia).

It connected the Great Southern Railway route with the Merredin to Narrogin railway line, providing railway access for farmers in the region. The Brookton–Dale River Railway Act 1923, assented to on 22 December 1923, authorised the construction of the railway line west from Brookton to the Dale River. It was planned to extend this line to Armadale but the line was never constructed. The Brookton to Dale River section of the line was however surveyed.

The stopping places on the line in 1915 between the two main towns were:

- Weam
- Nalya
- Aldersyde
- Mears
- Kweda
- Bulyee
- Lomos
- Jubuk
- Kunjinn

Services were generally sparse. By the 1930s it was down to one service a week.

However seasonal demand for the service in wheat delivery was evident in the 1940s.

Floods affected services at various stages in the lines history.

The railway line ceased operating in 1957.

== Closure ==
In 1954, the state government of Western Australia had compiled a list of loss-making railway operations, of which the Brookton to Corrigin line was one, having had a total expenditure of almost six times its earnings in the financial year to June 1953, £A 39,634 expenditure versus earnings of £A 6,668.

The Railways (Cue-Big Bell and other Railways) Discontinuance Act 1960, which was assented to on 12 December 1960, officially closed the Brookton to Corrigin railway. This act affected a number of Western Australian railways, officially closing 13 lines in the state.

== Legacy ==
The entire route of the Brookton-Corrigin railway line is listed on the Shire of Brookton heritage list. Apart from the line itself, the Brookton Railway Station precinct and the Kweda Railway siding are also on the shire's list.

In the Shire of Corrigin, the Railway Water Tank at Corrigin is listed on the State Register of Heritage Places and part of the larger and also heritage listed Corrigin Railway Precinct.
