= List of acts of the Parliament of Western Australia from 1923 =

This is a list of acts of the Parliament of Western Australia for the year 1923.

== 1923 ==
=== Public acts ===
Short title, or popular name	Citation	Royal assent
Long title
Dog Act Amendment Act 1922	No. X of 1923	15 February 1923
An Act to amend the Dog Act, 1903. (Note: Dog Act 1903 (No. 6))
Busselton–Margaret River Railway Deviation Act 1922	No. 3 of 1923	22 February 1923
An Act to authorise a Deviation of Busselton–Margaret River Railway.
Albany–Denmark Railway Extension Act 1923	No. 19 of 1923	22 February 1923
An Act to authorise an extension of the Albany–Denmark Railway.
Bridgetown–Jarnadup Railway Extension Act 1923	No. 20 of 1923	22 February 1923
An Act to authorise an extension of the Bridgetown–Jarnadup Railway.
Pinjarra–Dwarda Railway Extension Act Amendment Act 1923	No. 27 of 1923	23 November 1923
An Act to amend the Pinjarra–Dwarda Railway Extension Act, 1914. (Note: Pinjarra–Dwarda Railway Extension Act 1914 ())
Busselton–Margaret River Railway Deviation No. 2 Act 1923	No. 36 of 1923	15 December 1923
An Act to authorise a Deviation (No. 2) of Busselton–Margaret River Railway.
Flinders Bay–Margaret River Railway Deviation No. 1 Act 1923	No. 37 of 1923	15 December 1923
An Act to authorise a Deviation (No. 1) of Flinders Bay–Margaret River Railway.
Geraldton Harbour Works Railway Act 1923	No. 44 of 1923	22 December 1923
An Act to authorise the Construction of a Railway in connection with the Geraldton Harbour Works.
Lake Grace–Newdegate Railway Act 1923	No. 49 of 1923	22 December 1923
An Act to authorise the Construction of a Railway from Lake Grace to Newdegate.
Brookton–Dale River Railway Act 1923	No. 50 of 1923	22 December 1923
An Act to authorise the Construction of a Railway from Brookton to Dale River.
Yarramony–Eastward Railway Act 1923	No. 52 of 1923	22 December 1923
An Act to authorise the Construction of a Railway from Yarramony Eastward.
	No. X of 1923	
Appropriation Act 1923-24	No. 58 of 1923	22 December 1923
An Act to appropriate and apply out of the Consolidated Revenue Fund and from Moneys to Credit of the Trust Fund and the General Loan Fund and from the Public Account certain sums to make good the supplies granted for the Service of the Year ending the thirtieth ay of June, One thousand nine hundred and twenty-four, and to supplement grants made by the present Parliament during its last Session in adjustment of the Vote "Advance to Treasurer, 1922-23," for charges during the Year ended the 30th day of June, 1923.

=== Private acts ===
Short title, or popular name	Citation	Royal assent
Long title
Perpetual Executors, Trustees, and Agency Company (W.A.) Limited Act 1922 or the Perpetual Trustees W.A. Ltd., Act 1922 (repealed)	Private Act of 1923	19 February 1923
An Act to confer Powers upon "The Perpetual Executors, Trustees, and Agency Company (W.A.), Limited." (Repealed by Trustee Companies Act 1987 (No. 111))
West Australian Trustee Executor and Agency Company Limited Act Amendment Act 1923	Private Act of 1923	22 December 1923
An Act to amend "The West Australian Trustee Executor and Agency Company Limited Act." (Note: West Australian Trustee Executor and Agency Company Limited Act 1893 (56 Vict. Private Act))

== Sources ==
- "legislation.wa.gov.au".
