= Milnthorpe Model =

Fast-growing non-indigenous trees used as a nurse crop

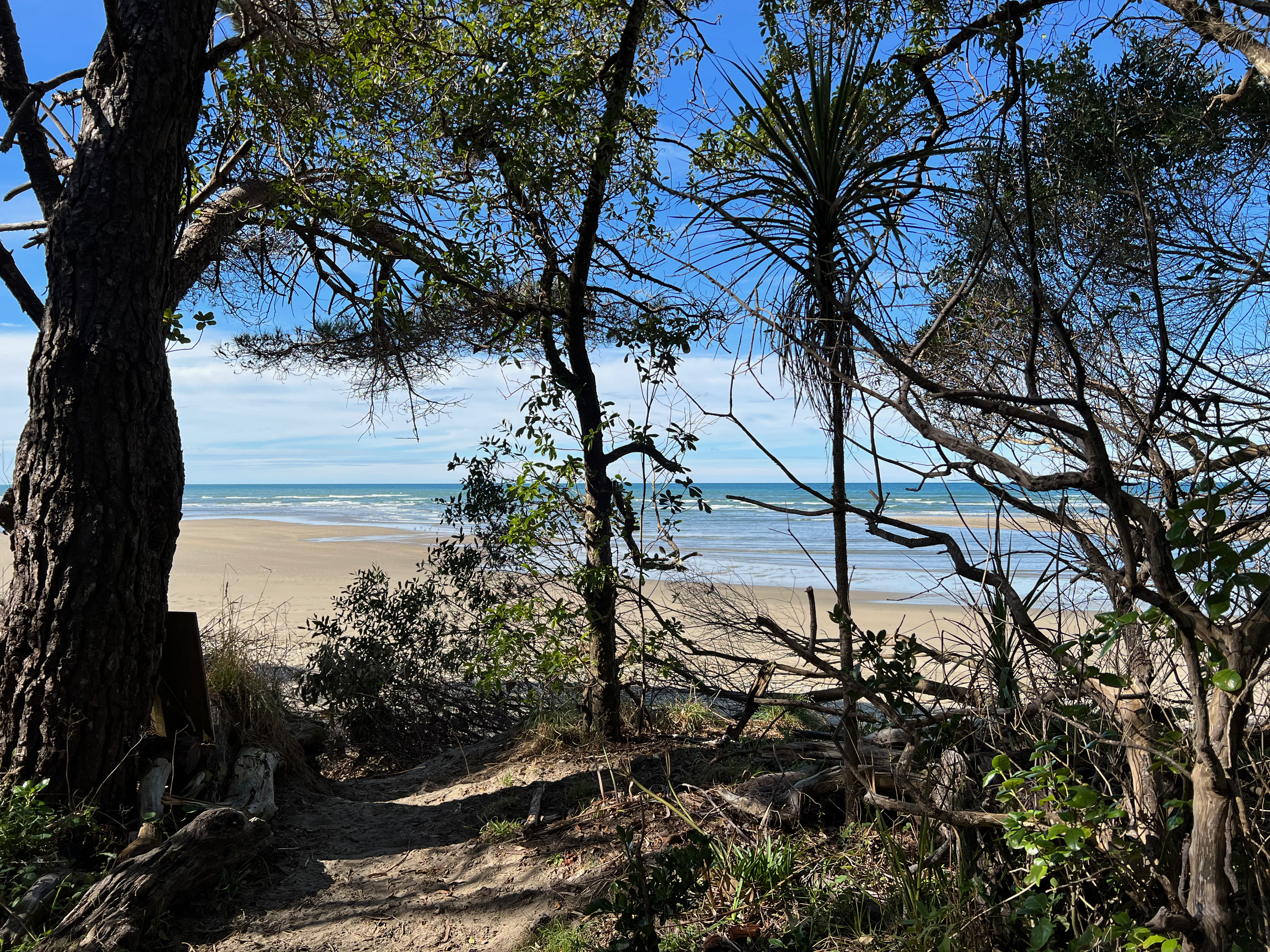
Exotics and natives combine to make a popular recreational ecosystem

The Milnthorpe Model describes a situation where fast-growing non-indigenous trees such as eucalypts, are used to colonise ex-pasture in order to establish a forested environment where indigenous canopy species can thrive.

The expression was coined in 2010 during a nationwide MAF (Ministry of Agriculture and Forestry) roadshow on carbon forestry and derives from a 162-hectare (400-acre) property near Parapara Inlet in Golden Bay, New Zealand. This marginal land was progressively planted from 1973 to create what is now a scenic reserve and an arboretum. It has an abundance of understorey species, predominantly natives, and is a popular location for recreational walks.

== Importance of the Milnthorpe Model ==
Recent years have been particularly tough for sheep and beef farmers in New Zealand. A report from Beef + Lamb New Zealand in 2023 forecast farm profitability to fall by 31% for the 2023–24 year, following a decline of 32% in 2022. This means profits for farmers have more than halved in two years. For example, it is now common for sheep farmers to spend more money on shearing their sheep than the return from their wool-clip.

There are several motives for seeking to afforest marginal farmland. First, it is often profitable to do so. The returns from wood can exceed the returns from livestock. In addition, there are payments from the sale of carbon offsetting. Lastly, there can be environmental benefits compared to pastoral farmland, in terms of reduced soil erosion, water quality, and buffering of flood peaks.

=== Benefit of eucalyptus trees ===
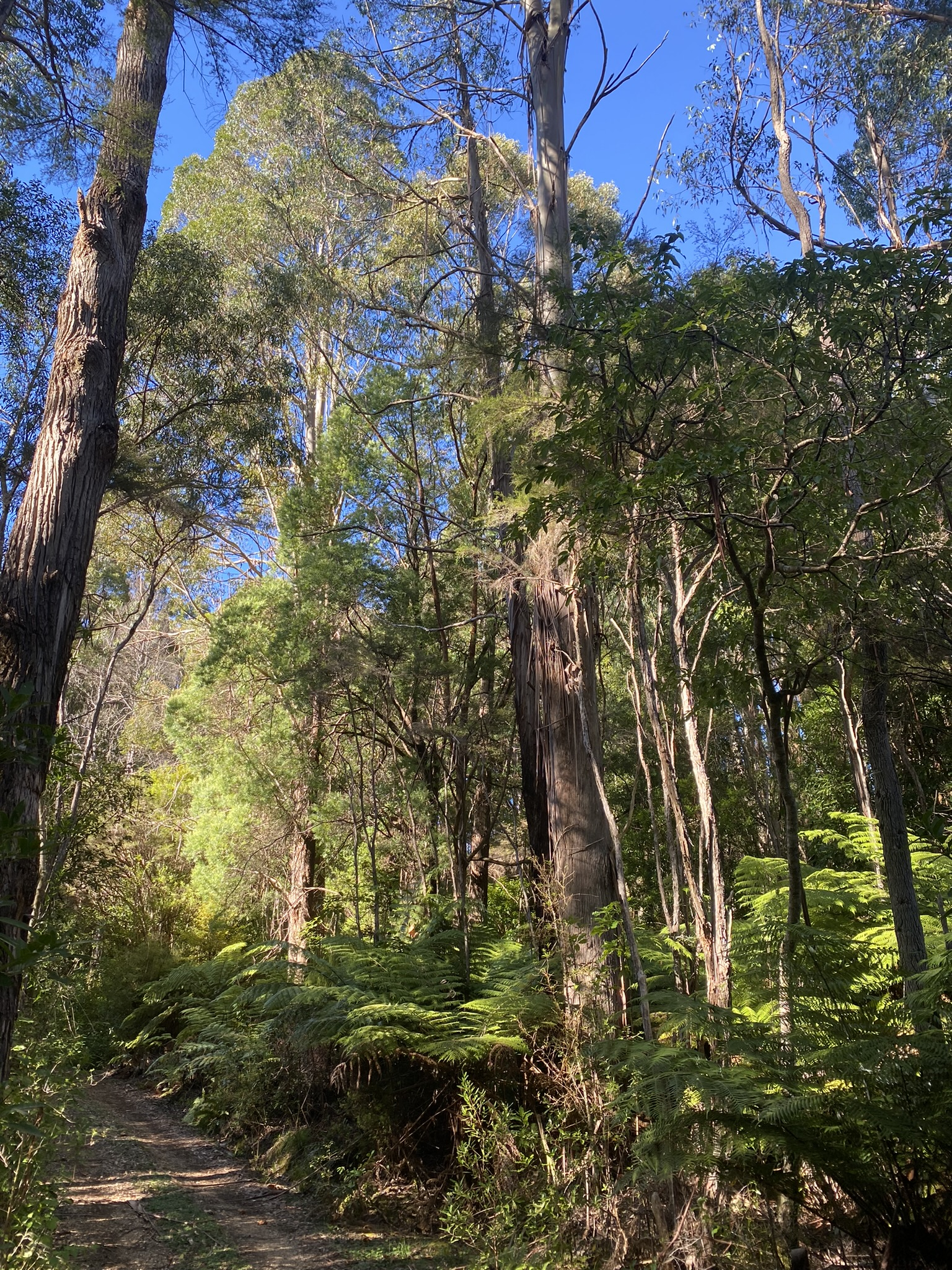
Indigenous species under a cover of mixed eucalypts

Carbon sequestration is about the conversion of a low-carbon ground cover such as pasture of short scrub to a forest with more biomass, and therefore carbon. Eucalypts, in particular, can create a huge volume of wood in a short time, although this will depend on the exact species of eucalyptus and the growing conditions of the site.

=== Importance of native trees ===
There is a widespread backlash, particularly from the farming community, against large conversions of farmland to forestry. In New Zealand, pine trees receive the most opprobrium, but in several other countries the target is eucalyptus plantations. Natives, on the other hand, have a favourable image everywhere. In New Zealand, this is accentuated because indigenous forest occupied nearly all suitable land in the fairly recent past, and because New Zealanders have a great love for their own flora, much of which is endemic.

=== Desirability of fast-growing introduced species ===
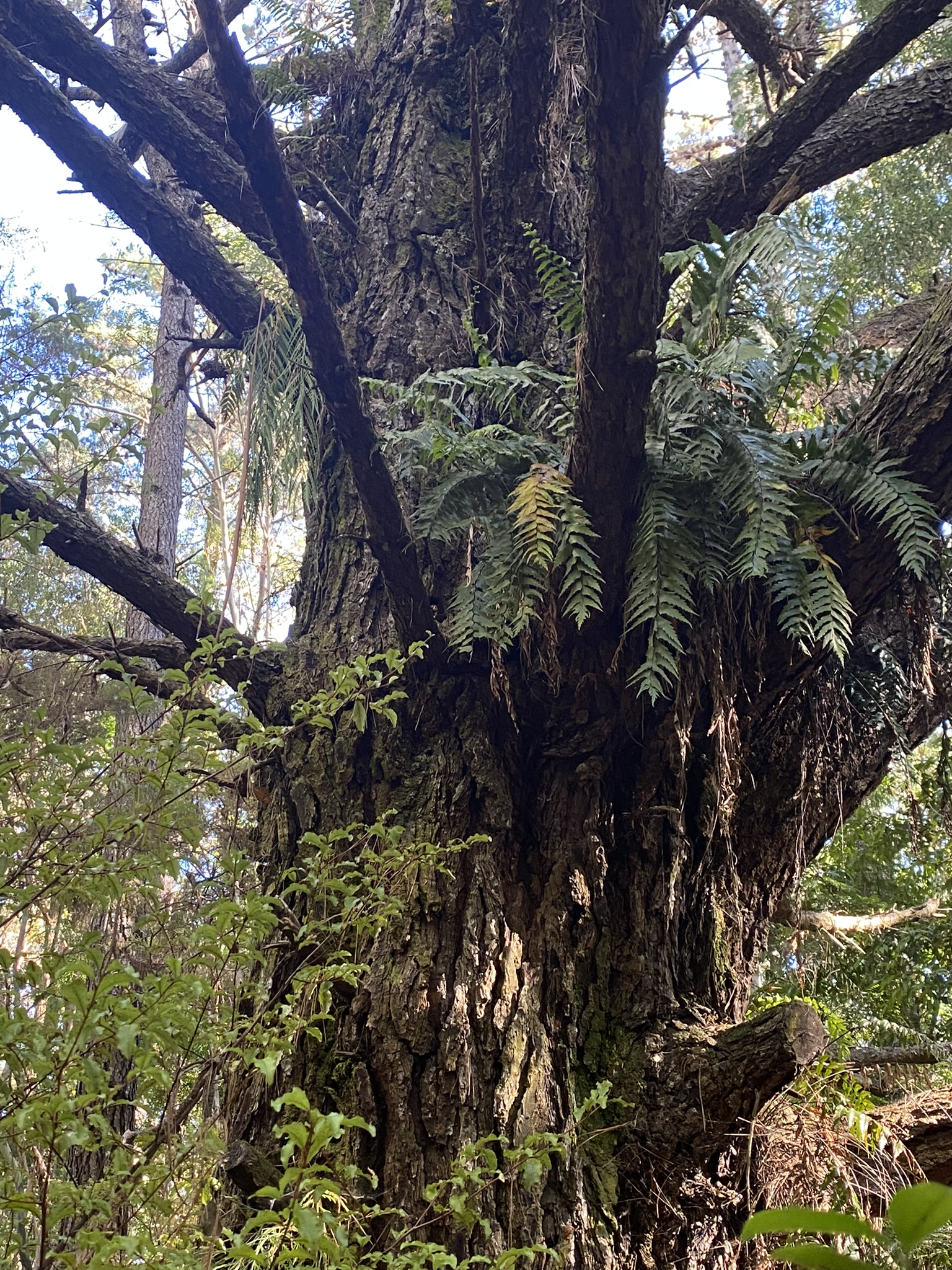
Indigenous epiphytes colonising a wilding radiata pine

It is desirable to plant eucalypts or other fast growing introduced species in New Zealand, in order to create a native forest. It is prohibitively expensive, in most cases, to directly plant natives (particularly with some of the preferred canopy species, such as podocarps). These expensive seedlings do not readily tolerate competition from grass or introduced woody weeds, and have a high mortality rate. The natural succession of native forest growth from a cleared area, such as a slip, would involve several stages, taking several hundred years altogether to reach their climax cover. On the other hand, planting eucalypts is relatively cheap, and the grass and other problematic weeds are soon shaded out. Seeds of a range of native species are brought in by birds and grow readily on the forest floor. It is thus usually quicker and cheaper to use non-indigenous trees as a nurse crop rather than directly establishing natives.

== Lessons from Milnthorpe Arboretum for native establishment ==
There is a mix of native understory species at Milnthorpe, such as tree ferns, māhoe (whiteywood) and coprosma. Occasionally, there are examples of self-sown kahikatea or tōtara, but most other canopy species such as rimu needed to be planted. In the light shade provided by eucalypts and on the weed-free forest floor, these species have a high rate of survival and growth.

== Nationwide applicability ==
In Milnthorpe, prior to planting there were large areas of gorse, blackberry (on better soils), prickly hakea, post-fire kanuka, and a few five finger. In the wetland areas, there were masses of stunted mānuka.

Milnthorpe Arboretum lies at sea-level in a warm, wet, fairly wind-free microclimate. Examples of similar plantings from other regions and microclimates must be examined before a useful generalisation could be made. A study of three such situations – including Milnthorpe – was undertaken by Forbes in 2021.
