= List of acts of the Parliament of Western Australia from 1926 =

This is a list of acts of the Parliament of Western Australia for the year 1926.

== 1926 ==
Short title, or popular name	Citation	Royal assent
Long title
	No. 1 of 1926	18 August 1926
An Act to apply out of the Consolidated Revenue Fund the sum of Eight Hundred and Fifty Thousand Pounds, and from Moneys to Credit of the General Loan Fund Seven Hundred and Fifty Thousand Pounds, and from Moneys to Credit of the Government Property Sales Fund Ten Thousand Five Hundred Pounds, and from Moneys to Credit of the Land Improvement Loan Fund Three Thousand Pounds to the Service of the Year ending 30th June, 1927, and to apply out of the Public Account the sum of Three Hundred Thousand Pounds for the purposes of temporary Advances to be made by the Treasurer.
	No. 2 of 1926	23 September 1926
An Act to apply out of the Consolidated Revenue Fund the sum of Four Hundred and Fifty Thousand Pounds, and from Moneys to Credit of the General Loan Fund Three Hundred and Seventy-five Thousand Pounds, and from Moneys to Credit of the Government Property Sales Fund Five Thousand Pounds, and from Moneys to Credit of the Land Improvement Loan Fund One Thousand Pounds to the Service of the Year ending 30th June, 1927.
Agricultural Bank Act Amendment Act 1926	No. 3 of 1926	23 September 1926
An Act to amend Section 10 of the Agricultural Bank Act, 1906. (Note: Agricultural Bank Act 1906 (No. 15))
City of Perth Act Amendment Act 1926	No. 26 of 1926	19 November 1926
An Act to amend the City of Perth Act, 1925. (Note: City of Perth Act 1925 (No. 11))
Lake Brown–Bullfinch Railway Act 1926	No. 37 of 1926	16 December 1926
An Act to authorise the Construction of a Railway from Lake Brown to Bullfinch.
Ejanding Northwards Railway Act 1926	No. 39 of 1926	16 December 1926
An Act to authorise the Construction of a Railway from Ejanding Northwards, with a spur line towards Mollerin.
Boyup Brook–Cranbrook Railway Act 1926	No. 40 of 1926	16 December 1926
An Act to authorise the Construction of a Railway from Boyup Brook to Cranbrook.
Manjimup–Mount Barker Railway Act 1926	No. 51 of 1926	24 December 1926
An Act to authorise the construction of a Railway from Manjimup to Mount Barker.
Government Railways Act Amendment Act 1926	No. 56 of 1926	24 December 1926
An Act to amend the provisions of the Government Railways Act, 1904, (Note: Government Railways Act 1904 (No. 23)) relating to Appeals and the Appeal Board, and to repeal Section fifty-two thereof.
	No. X of 1926	
South-West Electric Power Act 1926	No. 62 of 1926	24 December 1926
An Act for the constitution of a Trust for the construction, maintenance, and management of Works for the generation and supply of Electricity within a prescribed area in the South-West Division of the State, and for other relative purposes.

== Sources ==
- "legislation.wa.gov.au".
