= Kweda, Western Australia =

Kweda
- Town
- Coordinates: 32.38°S 117.42°E
- Country: Australia
- State: Western Australia
- LGA(s): Shire of Brookton
- Location: 190 km (120 mi) ESE of Perth; 43 km (27 mi) E of Brookton
- Established: 1915

Government
  - State electorate(s): Wagin
  - Federal division(s): O'Connor

Area
  - Total: 109.5 km^{2} (42.3 sq mi)
- Elevation: 250 m (820 ft)

Population
  - Total(s): 4 (SAL 2021)
- Postcode: 6306

Kweda is a small town that is located in the Wheatbelt region of Western Australia, about 45 kilometres (28 mi) east of the town of Brookton.

== History ==
The government was planning to build a railway line between Brookton and Kunjin (near Corrigin), in 1913. One of the proposed stations was a "Quandadine Siding", that is located near the Quandadine Pool in the Avon River. Marshall Fox, the district surveyor, proposed creating a townsite here in 1914, and the land was resumed for this purpose later that year.

By the time the Brookton to Corrigin railway was opened in 1915, the name of the siding had been changed to Kweda, and this was the name applied when the townsite was gazetted in 1918. This name may be derived from "Queeda", a Noongar name for the Casuarina tree.
