= Leioproctus korungensis =

Scientific classification
- Kingdom: Animalia
- Phylum: Arthropoda
- Clade: Pancrustacea
- Class: Insecta
- Order: Hymenoptera
- Family: Colletidae
- Genus: Leioproctus
- Species: L. korungensis

Binomial name
- Leioproctus korungensis Batley, 2025

Species of bee

Leioproctus korungensis, or Leioproctus (Euryglossidia) korungensis, is a species of bee in the family Colletidae and subfamily Colletinae. It is endemic to Australia. It was described by entomologist Michael Batley in 2025.

== Etymology ==
The specific epithet korungensis refers to Korung National Park where female specimens were collected.

== Description ==
The female body length is 10.0 mm, male body length 9.5 mm. Integumental colouration is mainly black, with weak blue iridescence. The hair is white to brown.

== Distribution and habitat ==
The species occurs in south-west Western Australia. The type locality of the male holotype is Helena Valley, Perth.

== Behaviour ==
The adults are flying mellivores. Flowering plants visited by the bees include Hakea lissocarpha.

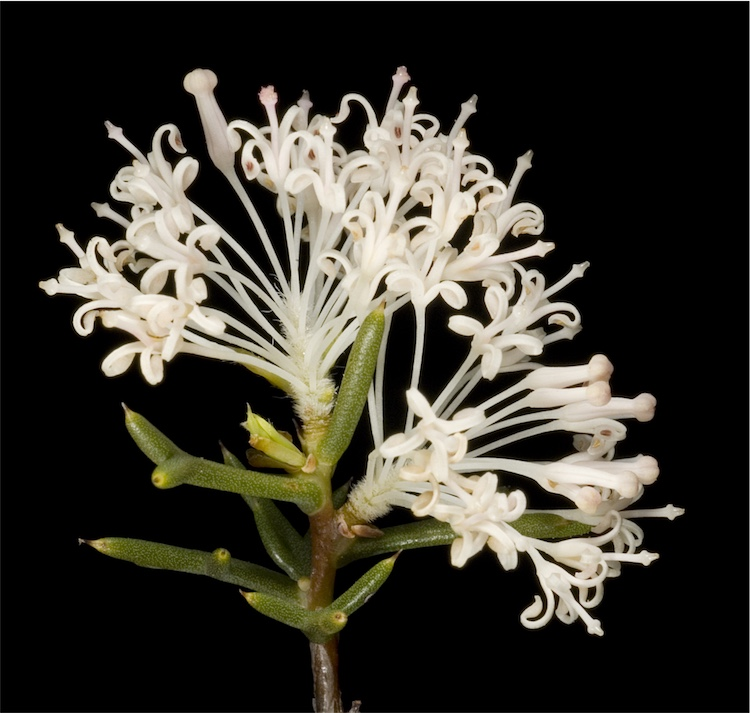
Flowers of Hakea lissocarpha (honey bush), a forage plant of the bees
