= Brookton–Dale River railway =

Proposed railway line in Western Australia

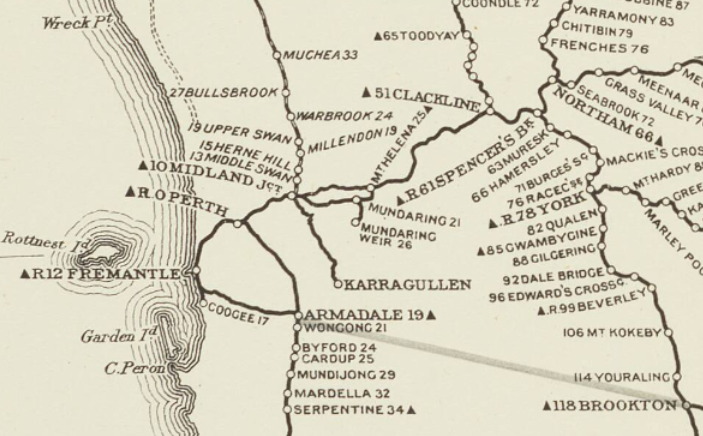
- Railway lines in 1926 (distances in miles): The Armadale to Brookton link is sketched in as a direct line

Overview
- Status: Approved by Parliament and surveyed but not constructed
- Locale: Wheatbelt, Western Australia
- Termini: Brookton; Dale River

Technical
- Line length: 42.7 km (26.5 mi)
- Track gauge: 1,067 mm (3 ft 6 in)
- Brookton–Dale River railway Main locations

The Brookton–Dale River railway was an authorised but never constructed railway line in the Wheatbelt region of Western Australia. The railway line was to head west from Brookton, where it connected to the Great Southern Railway and the Brookton to Corrigin railway, to Dale River. It was the eastern-most section of a proposed but never authorised Armadale to Brookton railway line.

== History ==
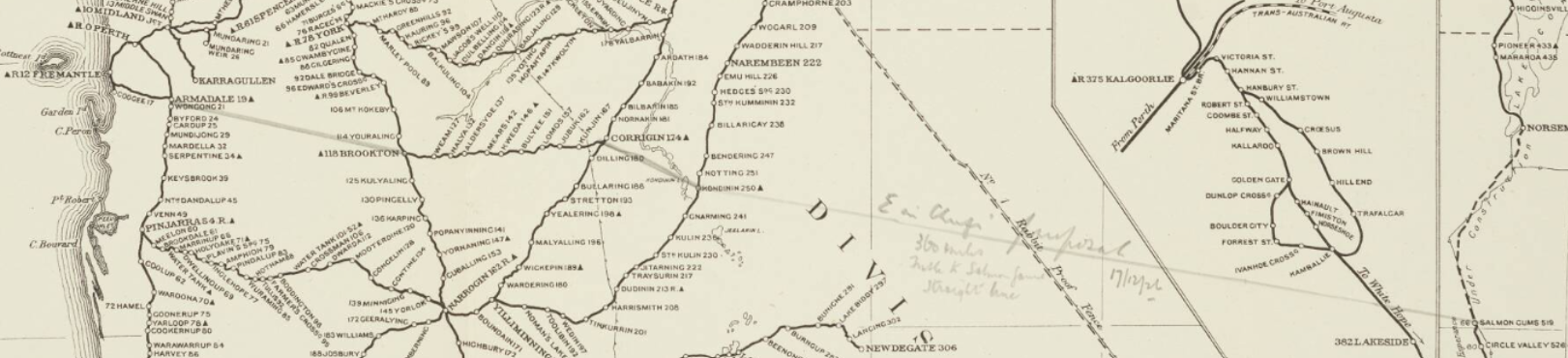
Railway lines in 1926 (distances in miles): The Armadale to Salmon Gums link is sketched in as a direct line

The Great Southern Railway, connecting Beverley to Albany, had reached Brookton in 1889 while the railway line connecting Brookton and Corrigin had opened on 19 April 1915.

The Brookton–Dale River Railway Act 1923, an act by the Parliament of Western Australia granted assent on 22 December 1923, authorised the construction of a 45-kilometre (28 mi) long railway line from Brookton west to Dale River.

The new railway line was to head north-north-westerly from Brookton for 3.2 kilometres (2.0 mi), then westerly for 10.5 kilometres (6.5 mi). From there, it would head south for 3.2 kilometres (2.0 mi), then westerly again for 13.8 kilometres (8.6 mi) and, finally, north-westerly for 12 kilometres (7.5 mi), for a total length of 42.7 kilometres (26.5 mi). At the time of its authorisation, it was seen as a part of a proposed Armadale to Brookton railway line.

In 1927, a trunk railway line from Fremantle via Armadale, Brookton and Corrigin and on from there to Salmon Gums on the Coolgardie to Esperance railway was proposed, of which only the Fremantle to Armadale and Brookton to Corrigin sections already existed.

Construction of the surveyed Brookton to Dale River railway line, as part of a connection to Armadale, was still seen as imminent in 1929. The railway line was not constructed because of difficult conditions during the Great Depression. By November 1932, the Western Australian government, under premier James Mitchell, admitted that it did not have the money to spare to construct the line which was estimated to cost £A 1,600 per mile of construction just for materials. For this reason, the state government had not constructed any railway lines in the previous two years.
