= Boyup Brook–Cranbrook railway =

Proposed railway line in Western Australia

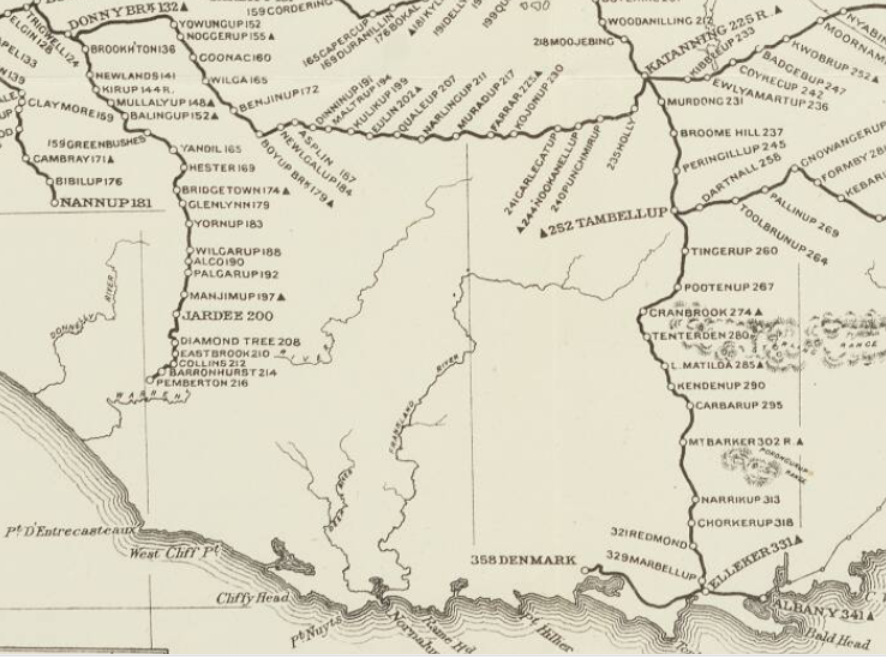
- Railway lines in 1926 (distances in miles): South West and Great Southern regions

Overview
- Status: Approved by Parliament and partially surveyed but not constructed
- Locale: South West and Great Southern, Western Australia
- Termini: Boyup Brook; Cranbrook

Technical
- Line length: 161 km (100 mi)
- Track gauge: 1,067 mm (3 ft 6 in)
- Boyup Brook–Cranbrook railway Main locations

The Boyup Brook–Cranbrook railway was an authorised but never constructed railway line in the South West and Great Southern regions of Western Australia. The railway line was to connect Boyup Brook, located on the Donnybrook–Katanning railway, with Cranbrook on the Great Southern Railway.

== History ==
The Great Southern Railway, connecting Beverley to Albany, had been opened in 1889 while the Donnybrook–Katanning railway reached Boyup Brook in 1909 and was completed to its full extend in 1912.

The Boyup Brook–Cranbrook Railway Act 1926, an act by the Parliament of Western Australia granted assent on 16 December 1926, authorised the construction of a 161-kilometre (100 mi) long railway line from Manjimup to Mount Barker.

The new railway line was to head south-east from Boyup Brook for 66 kilometres (41 mi), then east for 25 kilometres (16 mi). From there, the railway line was to head north-east for 11 kilometres (6.8 mi), then east for 36 kilometres (22 mi) and, finally, south-east again for 23 kilometres (14 mi) to Cranbrook.

The line, at the time of approval, was one of three east-west railway lines planned to connect the existing railway lines in the South West region with the Great Southern Railway. Further south, the Manjimup–Mount Barker railway had been authorised days after the Boyup Brook to Cranbrook one. The Pemberton to Denmark line, further south, near the coast, was the third of these but, unlike the other two, never authorised. It would have connected to the Elleker to Nornalup railway line at Denmark. The three lines were part of a plan to have railways in the area spaced 40 kilometres (25 mi) apart, to ensure no farm in the region would be more than 20 kilometres (12 mi) from a railway line. The cost of the railway lines was estimated in 1927 as £A 2,300 per mile but it was acknowledged that this cost could rise, depending on difficulties encountered.

The survey for the Boyup Brook to Cranbrook line were reported as ongoing in May 1928. In August 1929, it was reported that the Manjimup to Mount Barker and Boyup Brook to Cranbrook lines had been deferred and their lack of construction was negatively affecting the Port of Albany, where trade from the lines would flow through. In August 1930 it was announced that the state government had already abandoned the plan to build the railway line back in September 1928.

Some construction of the line took place in the early 1930s but stopped by 1933, with no public money available to purchase rails for the line. In August 1934, the state government's decision to remove railway sleepers from the partially constructed line caused local outrage.
