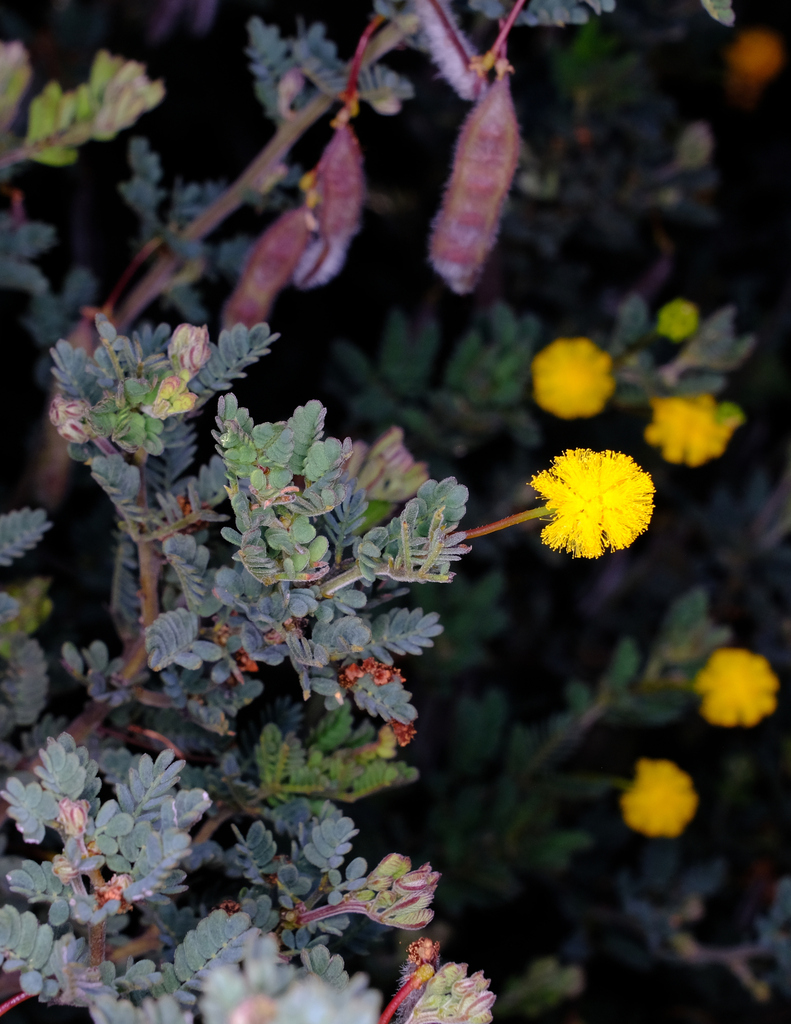
- Subspecies minor

Scientific classification
- Kingdom: Plantae
- Clade: Embryophytes
- Clade: Tracheophytes
- Clade: Spermatophytes
- Clade: Angiosperms
- Clade: Eudicots
- Clade: Rosids
- Order: Fabales
- Family: Fabaceae
- Subfamily: Caesalpinioideae
- Clade: Mimosoid clade
- Genus: Acacia
- Species: A. drewiana

Binomial name
- Acacia drewiana W.Fitzg.
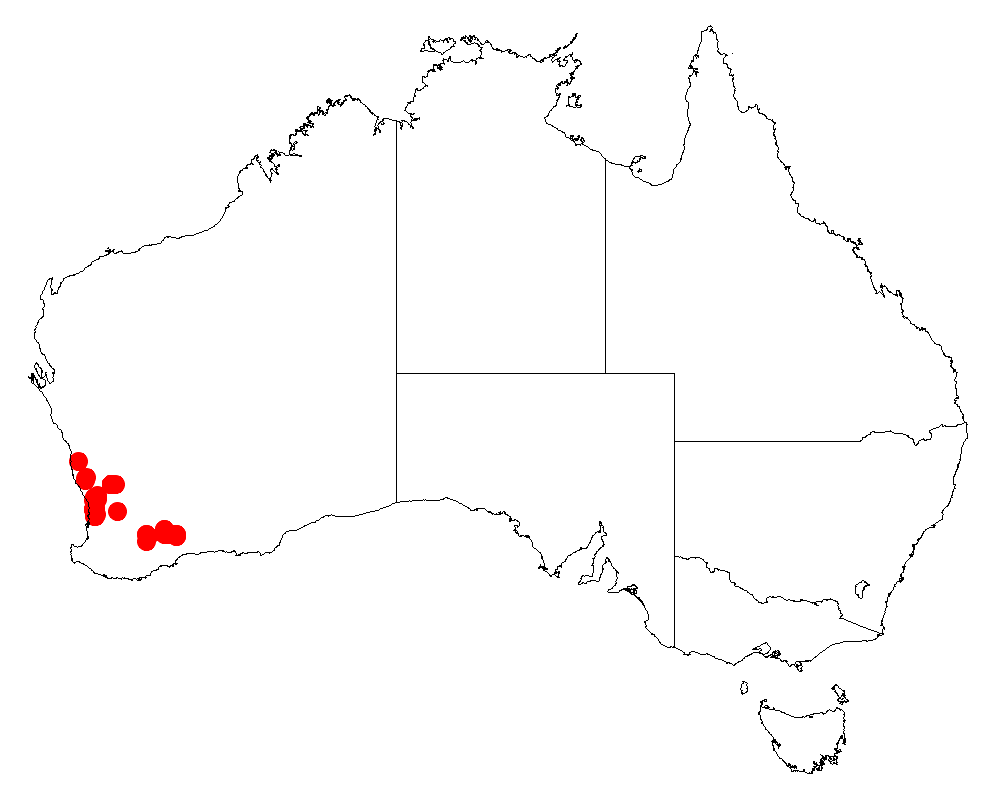
- Occurrence data from AVH

Synonyms
- Racosperma drewianum (W.Fitzg.) Pedley subsp. drewianum

= Acacia drewiana =

Species of plant

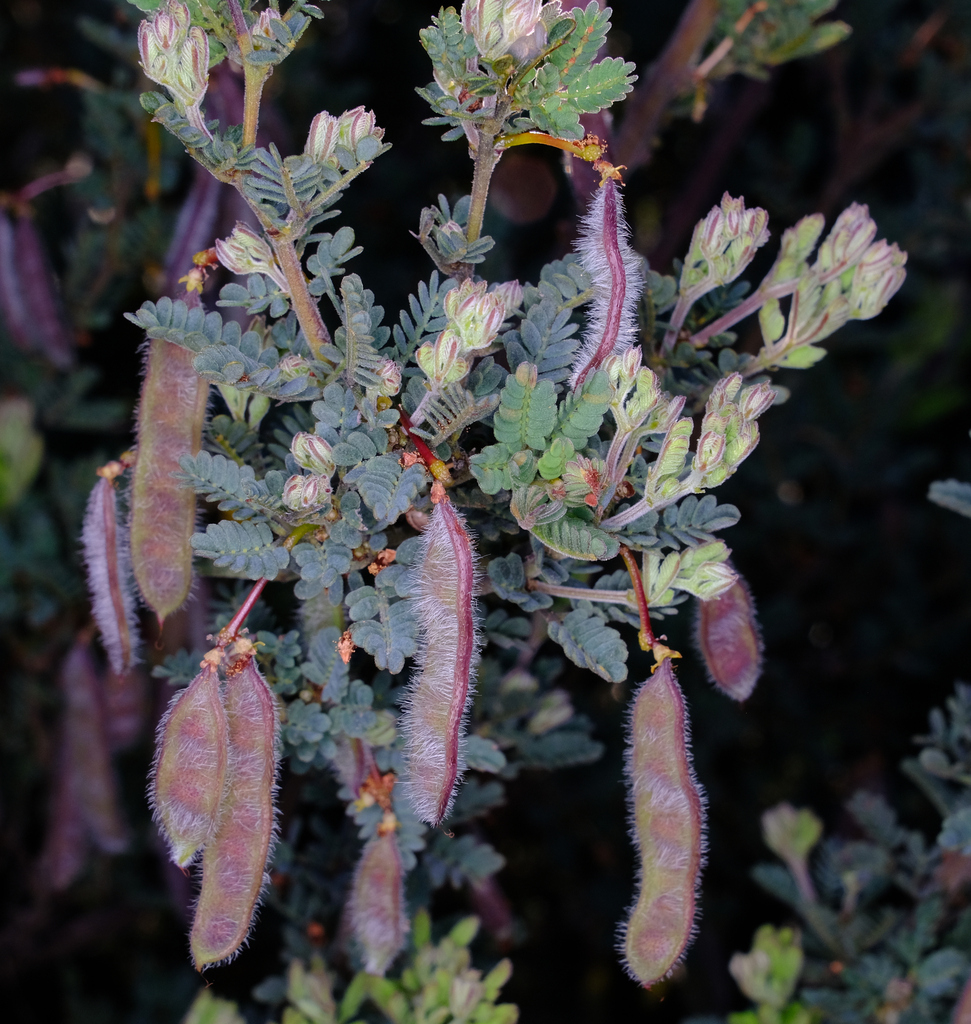
Pods (subsp. minor)

Acacia drewiana is a species of flowering plant in the family Fabaceae and is endemic to the south-west of Western Australia. It is a subshrub with hairy branchlets, bipinnate leaves, spherical heads of golden yellow flowers and leathery, narrowly oblong, crusty pods.

== Description ==
Acacia drewiana is a subshrub that typically grows to a height of 20–70 cm (7.9–27.6 in), commonly to about 30 cm (12 in) and has winding branchlets with soft hairs. The leaves are sessile bipinnate, 5–20 mm (0.20–0.79 in) long, continuous with and extending downwards from the branchlet. Each leaf has 2 to 4 pairs of pinnae, each with 2 to 6 pairs of narrowly oblong pinnules 2–7 mm (0.079–0.276 in) long, 1.0–1.5 mm (0.039–0.059 in) wide, with the edges rolled down or curved under. The flowers are borne in a spherical head in axils on a hairy peduncle 10–20 mm (0.39–0.79 in) long, each head large with 22 to 35 densely arranged, golden yellow flowers. Flowering occurs from April to July, and the pods are leathery, narrowly oblong, 30–70 mm (1.2–2.8 in) long, 6–7 mm (0.24–0.28 in) wide and crusty with shaggy and soft hairs.

== Taxonomy ==
Acacia drewiana was first formally described in 1917 by William Vincent Fitzgerald in the Journal and Proceedings of the Royal Society of New South Wales from specimens he collected near Cannington.

In 1975, Bruce Maslin described two subspecies of A. drewiana, and the names are accepted by the Australian Plant Census:

- Acacia drewiana W.Fitzg. subsp. drewiana has the tips of the pinna stalks flattened and turned down, the pinnules mostly 4–7 mm (0.16–0.28 in) long.
- Acacia drewiana subsp. minor Maslin the tips of the pinnacle stalks straight or turned down but not flattened, the pinnules 2–4 mm (0.079–0.157 in) long.

== Distribution and habitat ==
- Acacia drewiana subsp. drewiana grows in sandy loam, sand, gravel and clay in heath and open jarrah or wandoo woodland, sometimes in winter-wet depressions, from near Eneabba to Mundijong in the Geraldton Sandplains, Jarrah Forest and Swan Coastal Plain bioregions of south-western Western Australia.
- Acacia drewiana subsp. minor has a disjunct distribution, growing in similar habitats to the autonym, at Wongan Hills and near Newdegate in the Avon Wheatbelt and Mallee bioregions.

== Conservation status ==
Acacia drewiana subsp. drewiana is listed as "not threatened", but subsp. minor is listed as "Priority Two" by the Government of Western Australia Department of Biodiversity, Conservation and Attractions, meaning that it is poorly known and from one or a few locations.

== See also ==
- List of Acacia species
