= Manjimup–Mount Barker railway =

Proposed railway line in Western Australia

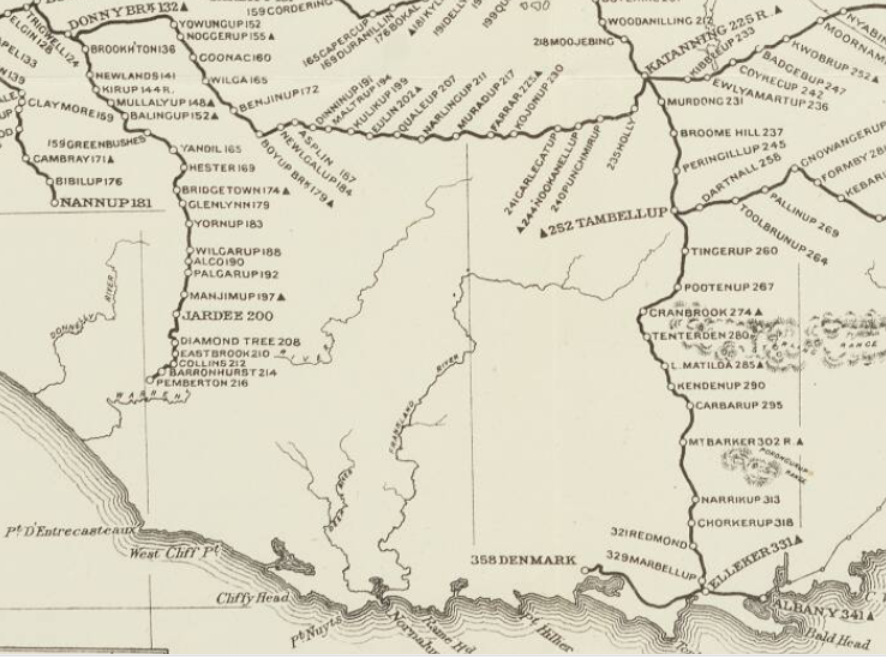
- Railway lines in 1926 (distances in miles): South West and Great Southern regions

Overview
- Status: Approved by Parliament and partially surveyed but not constructed
- Locale: South West and Great Southern, Western Australia
- Termini: Manjimup; Mount Barker

Technical
- Line length: 161 km (100 mi)
- Track gauge: 1,067 mm (3 ft 6 in)
- Manjimup–Mount Barker railway Main locations

The Manjimup–Mount Barker railway, was an authorised but never constructed railway line in the South West and Great Southern regions of Western Australia. The railway line was to connect Manjimup, located on the Northcliffe branch railway, with Mount Barker on the Great Southern Railway.

== History ==
The Great Southern Railway, connecting Beverley to Albany, had been opened in 1889 while the Northcliffe branch railway reached Manjimup in 1911. A railway line connecting these two lines, from Bridgetown to Mount Barker, was immediately advocated and a Bridgetown to Mount Barker Railway League formed in 1911. A report by the Railway Advisory Board from October 1911 recommended a route to Mount Barker branching off between Bridgetown and Manjimup rather than at Bridgetown as the most advantageous west-east route for a railway.

The Manjimup–Mount Barker Railway Act 1926, an act by the Parliament of Western Australia granted assent on 24 December 1926, authorised the construction of a 161-kilometre (100 mi) long railway line from Manjimup to Mount Barker.

The new railway line was to head south-east from Manjimup for 68 kilometres (42 mi), then east for 93 kilometres (58 mi) to Mount Barker.

The line, at the time of approval, was one of three east-west railway lines planned to connect the existing railway lines in the South West region with the Great Southern Railway. Further north, the Boyup Brook–Cranbrook Railway had been authorised days before the Manjimup Mount Barker one. The Pemberton to Denmark line, further south, near the coast, was the third of these but, unlike the other two, never authorised. It would have connected to the Elleker to Nornalup railway line at Denmark. The three lines were part of a plan to have railways in the area spaced 40 kilometres (25 mi) apart, to ensure no farm in the region would be more than 20 kilometres (12 mi) from a railway line. The cost of the railway lines was estimated in 1927 as £A 2,300 per mile but it was acknowledged that this cost could rise, depending on difficulties encountered.

The survey for the Manjimup to Mount Barker railway line commenced in October 1927 from the western end. The surveys for the line as well as the Boyup Brook to Cranbrook line were reported as ongoing in May 1928. In August 1929, it was reported that both lines had been deferred and their lack of construction was negatively affecting the port of Albany, where trade from the lines would flow through.

By 1953, transport policies in Western Australia had changed from rail to road, with the locations along the proposed Manjimup Mount Barker Railway and the Yarramony–Eastward Railway, also not constructed, receiving road upgrades and road transport subsidiaries instead of a railway line. At this point in time, the state government did not close lines, despite only one third of the ones in Western Australia running at a profit, and felt obliged to keep lose-making lines open which had attracted settlers through its construction.
