= Shire of Brookton =

Coordinates: 32°22′05″S 117°00′22″E

- Local government area
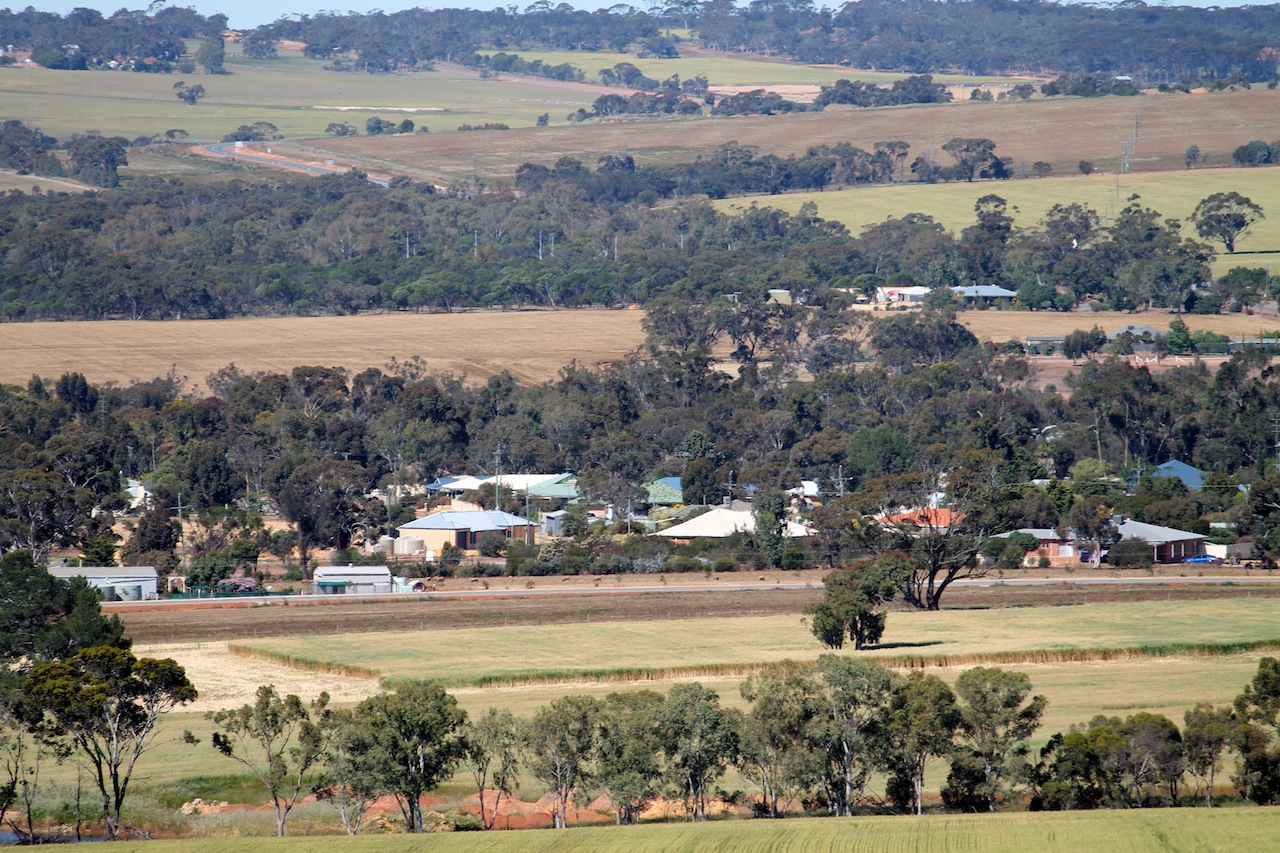
- Brookton from the west

- Interactive map of Shire of Brookton
- Country: Australia
- State: Western Australia
- Region: Wheatbelt
- Established: 1906
- Council seat: Brookton

Government
  - Shire President: Roderick Wallis
  - State electorate: Central Wheatbelt
  - Federal division: O'Connor

Area
  - Total: 1,601.6 km^{2} (618.4 sq mi)

Population
  - Total: 929 (LGA 2021)
- Website: Shire of Brookton
LGAs around Shire of Brookton
Beverley	Beverley	Quairading
Wandering	Shire of Brookton	Corrigin
Wandering	Pingelly	Pingelly

The Shire of Brookton is a local government area in the Wheatbelt region of Western Australia, about 140 kilometres (87 mi) southeast of Perth, the state capital. The Shire covers an area of 1,602 square kilometres (619 sq mi) and its seat of government is the town of Brookton.

The local economy, worth approximately $25 million per year to the state economy, is based on agriculture - predominantly cereal grains and sheep.

== History ==
The Brookton Road District was established on 27 April 1906 after Mr Samuel Williams led a move by local landowners to break away from the Beverley Road District, and met for the first time on 10 September that year. On 1 July 1961, it became the Shire of Brookton under the Local Government Act 1960, which reformed all remaining road districts into shires.

== Wards ==
The shire presently is undivided and has 7 councillors. Prior to the 2009 local government election, it was divided into three wards as follows:

- Central Ward (5 councillors)
- West Ward (2 councillors)
- East Ward (2 councillors)

=== 2023 election results ===
Two vacancies were not filled and a by-election was held in 2024.

2023 Western Australian local elections: Brookton
Party	Candidate	Votes	%	±%
Independent	Tamara Lilly (elected)	unopposed		
Independent	Lachlan McCabe (elected)	unopposed		
Registered electors		684		

== Towns and localities ==
The towns and localities of the Shire of Brookton with population and size figures based on the most recent Australian census:

Locality	Population	Area	Map
Aldersyde	41 (SAL 2021)	390 km^{2} (150 sq mi)	
Brookton	732 (SAL 2021)	580.9 km^{2} (224.3 sq mi)	
Jelcobine	154 (SAL 2021)	520.8 km^{2} (201.1 sq mi)	
Kweda	4 (SAL 2021)	109.5 km^{2} (42.3 sq mi)	

== Population ==
Historical population

Year	Pop.	±% p.a.
1911	1,268	—
1921	1,149	−0.98%
1933	1,188	+0.28%
1947	934	−1.70%
1954	1,376	+5.69%
1961	1,319	−0.60%
1966	1,341	+0.33%
1971	1,272	−1.05%
1976	1,181	−1.47%

Year	Pop.	±% p.a.
1981	1,214	+0.55%
1986	1,093	−2.08%
1991	1,018	−1.41%
1996	908	−2.26%
2001	957	+1.06%
2006	978	+0.44%
2011	934	−0.92%
2016	975	+0.86%
2021	929	−0.96%

== Heritage-listed places ==
As of 2023, 89 places are heritage-listed in the Shire of Brookton, of which none are on the State Register of Heritage Places.
