= Aldersyde, Western Australia =

Town in the Wheatbelt region of Western Australia

Aldersyde
- Town
- Coordinates: 32.374°S 117.278°E
- Country: Australia
- State: Western Australia
- LGA(s): Shire of Brookton
- Location: 179 km (111 mi) ESE of Perth; 32 km (20 mi) E of Brookton
- Established: 1915

Government
  - State electorate(s): Wagin
  - Federal division(s): O'Connor

Area
  - Total: 390 km^{2} (150 sq mi)
- Elevation: 238 m (781 ft)

Population
  - Total(s): 41 (SAL 2021)
- Postcode: 6306

Aldersyde is a small town in the Wheatbelt region of Western Australia, about 32 kilometres (20 mi) east of the town of Brookton.

== History ==
Land for a proposed townsite at the 18½-mile peg on the Brookton-Kunjin Railway (Kunjin being near Corrigin) was reclaimed from four properties in 1913. One of the properties, owned by Frederick Pyke, was named "Aldersyde", and this name was suggested as the name of the town by the local progress association in 1914. "Nuralgin" and "Markegin" were other names considered; Aldersyde was gazetted in 1915.

The surrounding areas produce wheat and other cereal crops. The town is a receival site for Cooperative Bulk Handling.
