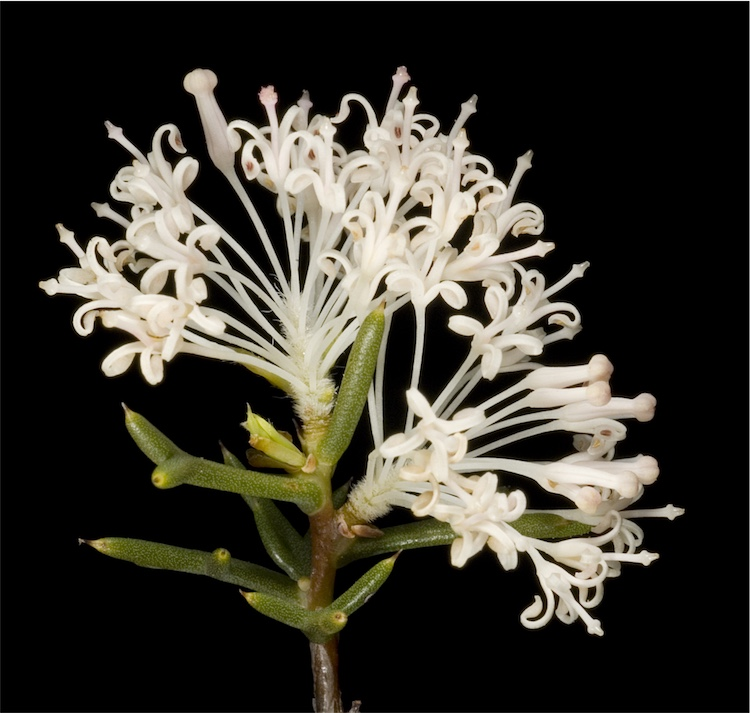
- Hakea lissocarpha growing near Aldersyde

Conservation status
- Least Concern (IUCN 3.1)

Scientific classification
- Kingdom: Plantae
- Clade: Tracheophytes
- Clade: Angiosperms
- Clade: Eudicots
- Order: Proteales
- Family: Proteaceae
- Genus: Hakea
- Species: H. lissocarpha

Binomial name
- Hakea lissocarpha R.Br.
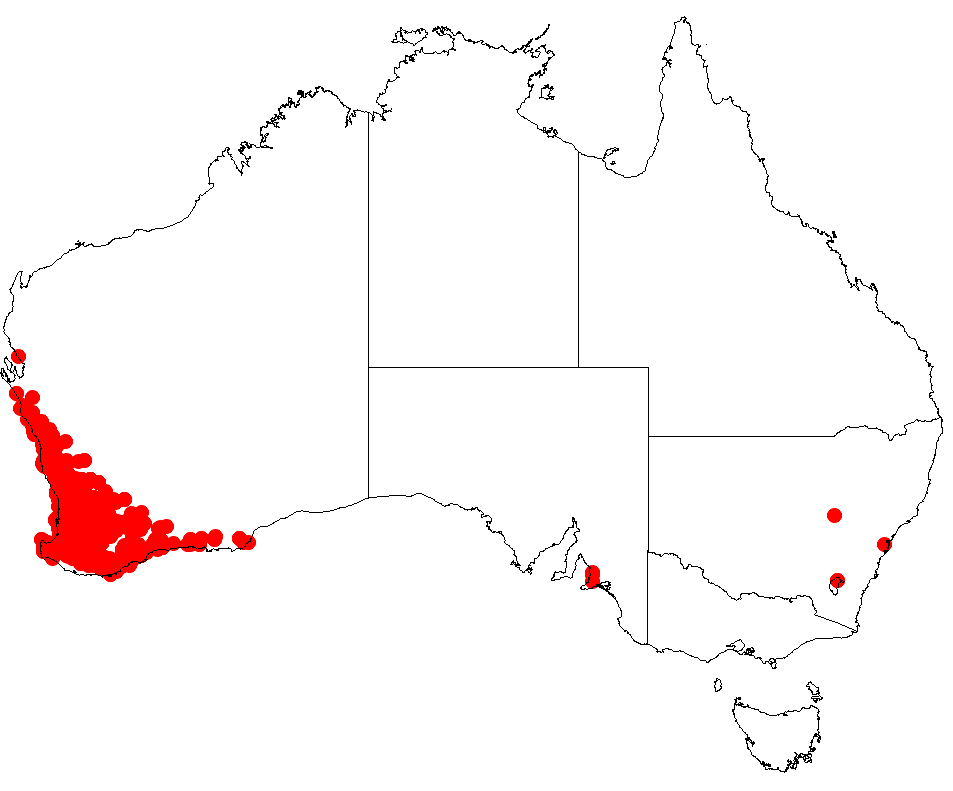
- Occurrence data from AVH

= Hakea lissocarpha =

Honey bush

Species of shrub from Western Australia

Hakea lissocarpha, commonly known as honey bush or the duck and drake bush, is a shrub of the genus Hakea native to a large area in the Mid West, Wheatbelt, Peel, South West, Great Southern and Goldfields-Esperance regions of Western Australia.

== Description ==
The pungent lignotuberous, dense, spreading shrub typically grows to a height of 0.4 to 1.5 metres (1 to 5 ft) with smooth to roughish grey bark. It blooms from May to September and produces vert sweetly scented white-cream/yellow/pink flowers in racemes in the leaf axils and upper branchlets. The leaves are short, terete and sharply pointed, divided into many segments. The ovoid fruit are smooth to roughish and warty, 1.5–2 cm (0.6–0.8 in) long by 1 cm (0.4 in) tapering to two short beaks.

== Taxonomy and naming ==
Hakea lissocarpha was first formally described in 1830 by Robert Brown. It is named from the Greek lissos - smooth and carphos - dry grass, referring to the bracts surrounding the flower bud.

== Distribution and habitat ==
A variable and common species, widespread from coast of Northampton to Israelite Bay. Grows in heath or woodland on sand, loam, lateritic gravel or limestone. Requires a sunny or semi-shaded aspect with good drainage. May be used for hedging and wildlife habit and is drought and frost tolerant.

== Conservation status ==
Hakea lissocarpha is classified as "not threatened" by the Western Australian Government.
