= Yarramony–Eastward railway =

Proposed railway line in Western Australia

Coordinates: 31.487753°S 116.727458°E

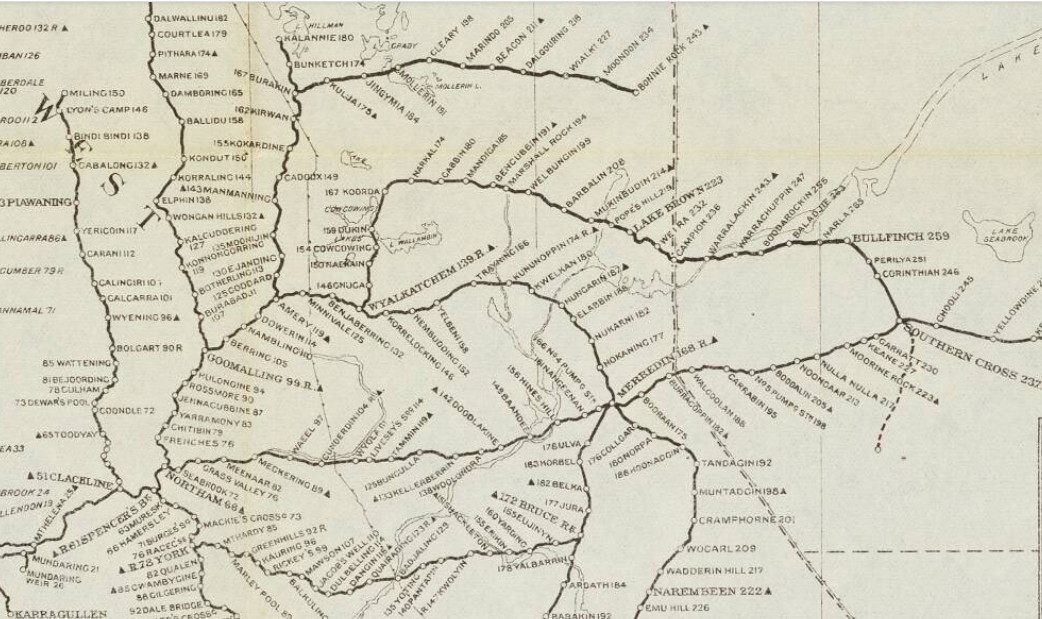
- Wheatbelt railway lines in 1934 (distances in miles): Yarramony is to the centre-left while Merredin is near the centre

Overview
- Status: Approved by Parliament and surveyed but not constructed
- Locale: Wheatbelt, Western Australia
- Termini: Yarramony; Merredin

Technical
- Line length: 138 km (86 mi)
- Track gauge: 1,067 mm (3 ft 6 in)
- Yarramony–Eastward railway Main locations

The Yarramony–Eastward railway was an authorised but never constructed railway line in the Wheatbelt region of Western Australia. The railway line was to connect Yarramony, a siding on what is now the Avon Yard to Mullewa railway line, to Merredin.

== History ==
=== Siding ===
Yarramony, located in Jennacubbine, Shire of Goomalling, and Jennapullin, Shire of Northam, became a siding on the Northam–Goomalling railway when the line was opened on 1 July 1902. The siding was eventually closed in 1984 while the railway line passing through it remains operational.

The unusual nature of the siding, with the shire border running through it, had unintended effects in 1962. Because of a total harvest ban resulting from fire danger in the Shire of Goomalling, the receival of wheat was stopped by shire orders at Yarramony on a summer day in 1961–62. As no such ban was in place in the Shire of Northam, receival of grain was authorised a few hours later again by the other shire. The latter was eventually found as lawful as the grain loading facilities were in the Shire of Northam. However, the Shire of Goomalling established that it had been maintaining access roads to the facilities that were not in its shire.

=== Railway line ===
The Yarramony–Eastward Railway Act 1923, an act by the Parliament of Western Australia granted assent on 22 December 1923, authorised the construction of a 138-kilometre (86 mi) long railway line from Yarramony eastbound.

The new railway line was to head east-northeast from Yarramony siding for 50 kilometres (31 mi), then east-southeast for 18 kilometres (11 mi), then east for 18 kilometres (11 mi). From there it would turn east-northeast again for 31 kilometres (19 mi), east-southeast for 9 kilometres (5.6 mi) and, finally, east for 12 kilometres (7.5 mi).

Although not stated in the act at the time, this would have taken the railway line to the area of Merredin. It was named as such in 1925. In 1938, the line was reported as surveyed but not constructed.

Also authorised, the railway line was not constructed, despite £A 30,000 being set aside for its construction. The member for the electoral district of Avon, Harry Griffiths, bitterly complained in 1925 about the lack of action on constructing the line, which had been proposed since 1908.

In the 1920s the associated "railway leagues" in relation to the rail route had grown interesting names from localities that they represented such as the "Yorkrakine Raandee Railway League".

Griffiths again raised the issue in parliament in 1930, and again was disappointed by the lack of action on the railway. In 1945, a railway league proposing the Yarramony–East railway was formed, and continued to be active and hold meetings in the following years. This railway league was still active in 1948.

By 1953, transport policies in Western Australia had changed from rail to road, with the locations along the proposed Yarramony railway line and the Manjimup–Mount Barker railway, also not constructed, receiving road upgrades, road transport subsidiaries, weighbridges and grain receival points instead of a railway line. At this point in time, the state government did not close lines, despite only one third of the ones in Western Australia running at a profit, and felt obliged to keep lose-making lines open which had attracted settlers through its construction.
