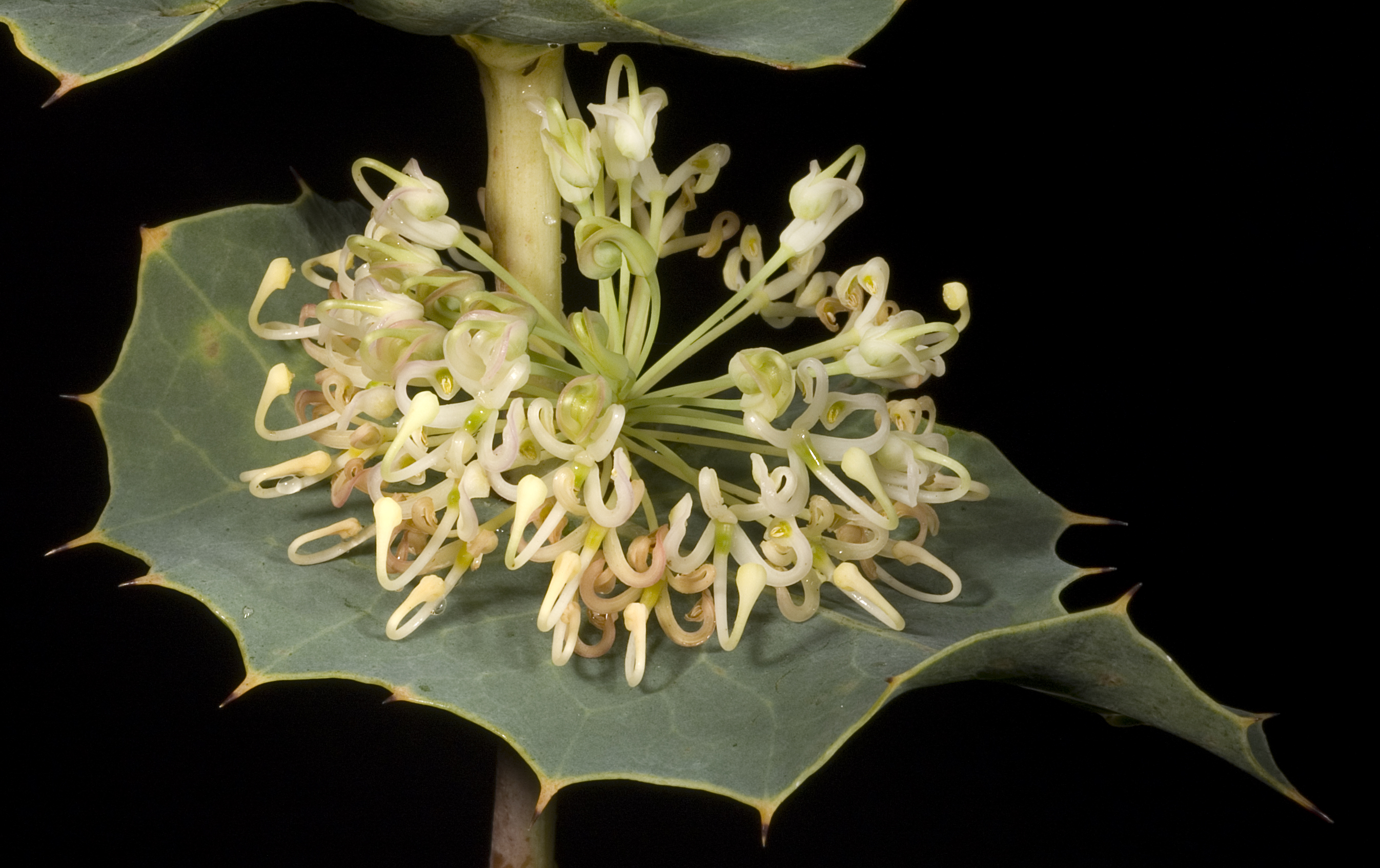

Scientific classification
- Kingdom: Plantae
- Clade: Tracheophytes
- Clade: Angiosperms
- Clade: Eudicots
- Order: Proteales
- Family: Proteaceae
- Genus: Hakea
- Species: H. amplexicaulis

Binomial name
- Hakea amplexicaulis R.Br.
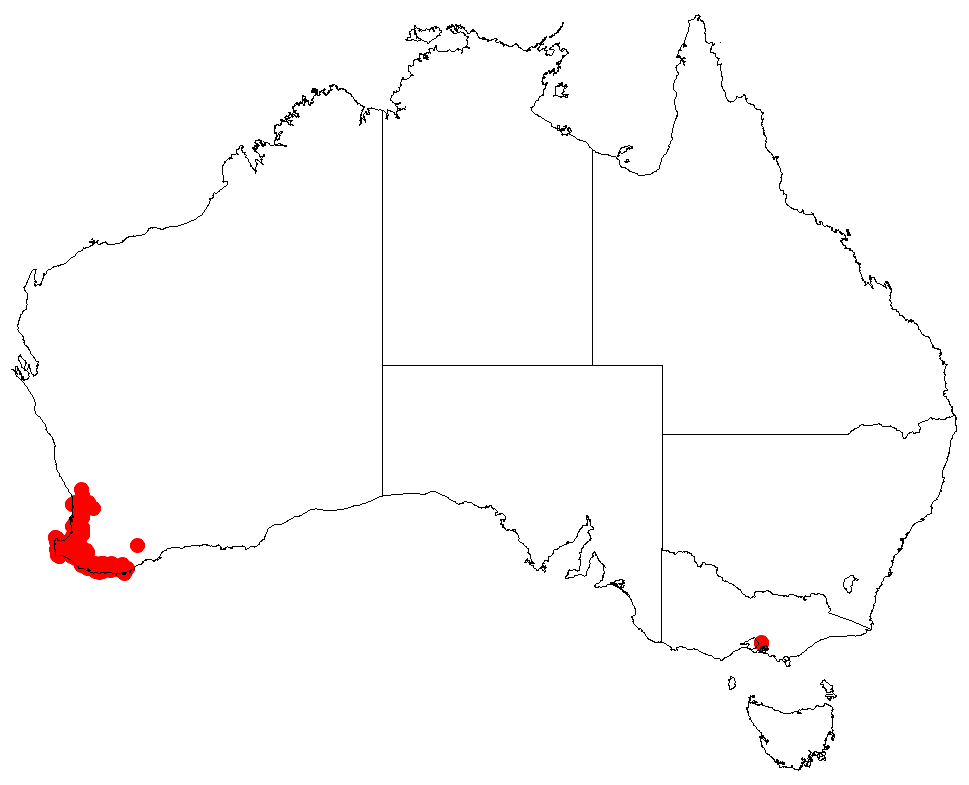
- Occurrence data from Australasian Virtual Herbarium

Synonyms
- Hakea amplexicaulis R.Br. var. amplexicaulis Hakea amplexicaulis var. latifolia Meisn. Hakea triformis Lindl. Hakea amplexicaulis var. angustifolia Meisn.

= Hakea amplexicaulis =

Prickly hakea

Species of shrub endemic to Western Australia

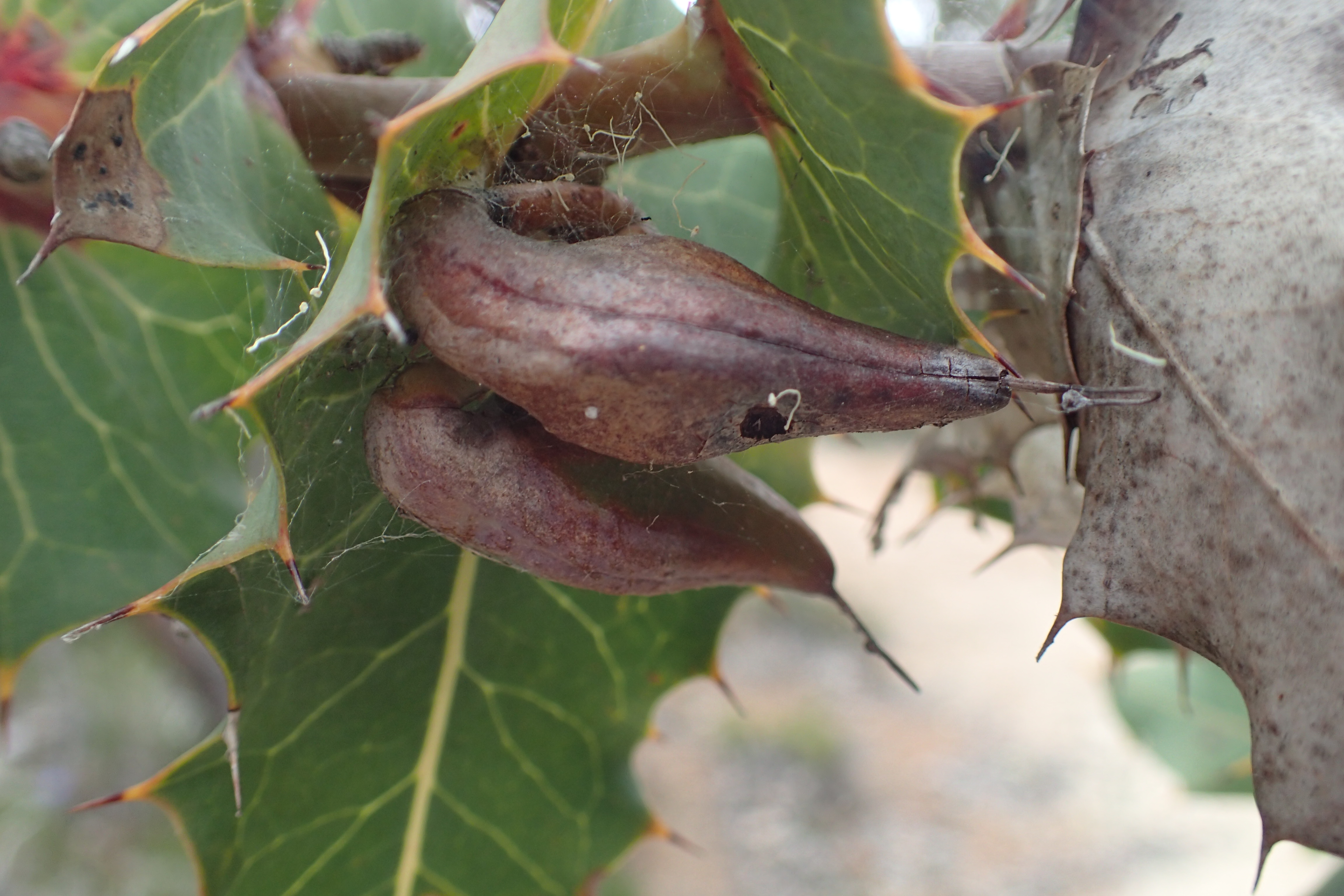
Fruit

Hakea amplexicaulis, commonly known as prickly hakea, is a shrub endemic to south west Western Australia. An attractive small shrub with unusual stem clasping, sharply serrated foliage and a profusion of sweetly scented variable coloured flowers from late winter to spring.

== Description ==
Hakea amplexicaulis is an upright, straggly shrub growing to 1 to 3 metres (3 to 10 ft) high with smooth smaller branches and forms a lignotuber. The leaves are narrowly egg-shaped or totally egg-shaped, 3–18 cm (30–200 mm) long and 20–65 mm (0.8–3 in) wide. The stem clasping leaves are sharply toothed with 12–30 2–6 mm (0.08–0.2 in) long teeth on each side, smooth, bluish-green with a powdery film. The inflorescence has 36-42 large, rounded and strongly scented flowers on a short stem. Clusters of white, cream, pink or red flowers appear in leaf axils; they may become pink or a reddish hue as they age. The pedicel is 6–14 mm (0.2–0.6 in) long. The perianth is smooth 4–6 mm (0.2–0.2 in) long, white occasionally with a pink tinge and the style is smooth. The fruit are egg-shaped 3–3.5 cm (1–1 in) long and 12–15 mm (0.5–0.6 in) wide, smooth with a few sharp spines, and taper to a blunt beak. Flowering occurs from August to November.

== Taxonomy and naming ==
The species was first formally described in 1810 by Robert Brown and the description was published in Transactions of the Linnean Society of London. The specific epithet (amplexicaulis) is derived from the Latin words amplexus meaning "encircled" or "embraced" and caulis meaning "stem", referring to the stem-clasping habit at the base of the leaf.

== Distribution and habitat ==
Hakea amplexicaulis is found in jarrah forests from Perth to Albany. This species grows in clay, loam and gravelly acidic soils in a well-drained site in sun or partial shade. A showy shrub, good for wildlife habitat and is moderately frost hardy.

== Conservation status ==
Hakea amplexicaulis is classified as "not threatened" by Western Australian government Department of Parks and Wildlife.
