= Brookton, Western Australia =

Brookton
- Town
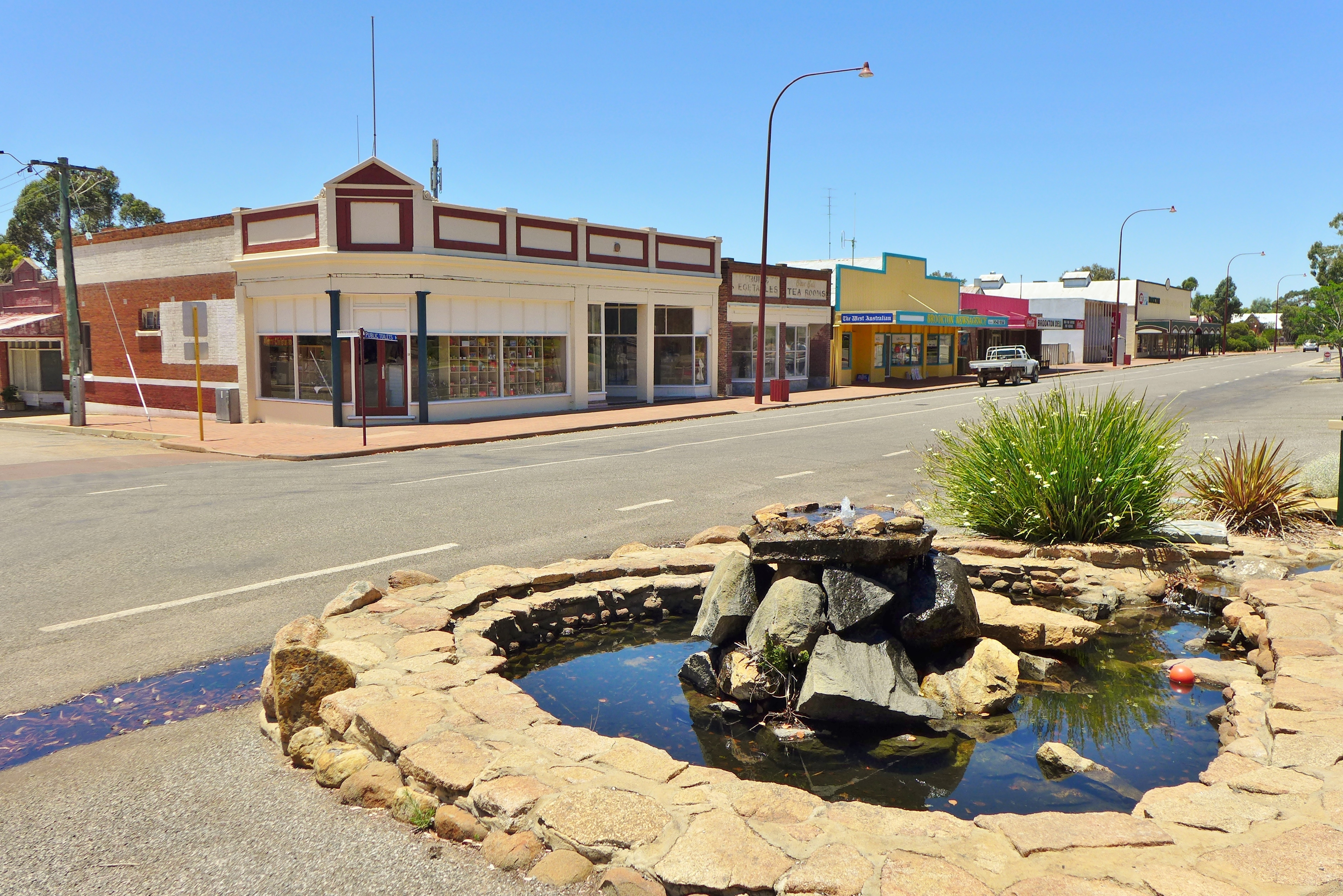
- View of Robinson Road, Brookton, 2014

- Interactive map of Brookton
- Coordinates: 32.368°S 117.006°E
- Country: Australia
- State: Western Australia
- LGA: Shire of Brookton
- Location: 138 km (86 mi) ESE of Perth
- Established: 1890s

Government
  - State electorate: Wagin
  - Federal division: O'Connor

Area
  - Total: 580.9 km^{2} (224.3 sq mi)
- Elevation: 250 m (820 ft)

Population
  - Total: 532 (UCL 2021)
- Postcode: 6306
- Mean max temp: 23.8 °C (74.8 °F)
- Mean min temp: 9.4 °C (48.9 °F)
- Annual rainfall: 458.2 mm (18.04 in)

Brookton is a town in the Wheatbelt region of Western Australia, 138 kilometres (86 mi) from the state capital, Perth via the Brookton Highway where it crosses the Great Southern Highway. The town is on the Great Southern railway line. It is within, and is the seat of government for, the Shire of Brookton. At the 2016 census, Brookton had a population of 975.

== History ==
The first settler and founder of the Brookton district, John Seabrook (1818–1891), moved to the area in 1846 soon after marrying, and named his property "Brookton House". He remained the only European in the area, aside from itinerant sandalwood cutters, until his stepson, A. W. Robinson, took up adjacent land in 1864. During the 1860s and 1870s, more settlers moved into the area, and took on sandalwood cutting – it sold for £8.9 per tonne (£9 per long ton) – as well as wheat and sheep farming.

In June 1889, when the Great Southern Railway opened, Brookton was one of the original stations. The station proved to be the catalyst that created a centre for the isolated farms, and the government gazetted a townsite here in 1895 and named it "Seabrook" but local acceptance of the station name and confusion with another Seabrook near York resulted in the townsite's name being changed to Brookton in 1899. The townsite attracted a few businesses and by 1903, the tiny settlement comprised a school, hotel, bank and a few shops. The Old Police Station Museum located in the town is the base of the local historical society and contains artifacts and memorabilia of the early settlement days.

A bulk wheat bin was opened in December 1940 and began receiving large amounts of grain immediately. In 1941 the wheat harvest of the surrounding area was about 3,300 cubic metres (90,000 imperial bushels) all delivered to the local bulk wheat bin. This was about 180 cubic metres (5,000 imperial bushels) bushels down from the previous year.

== Present day ==
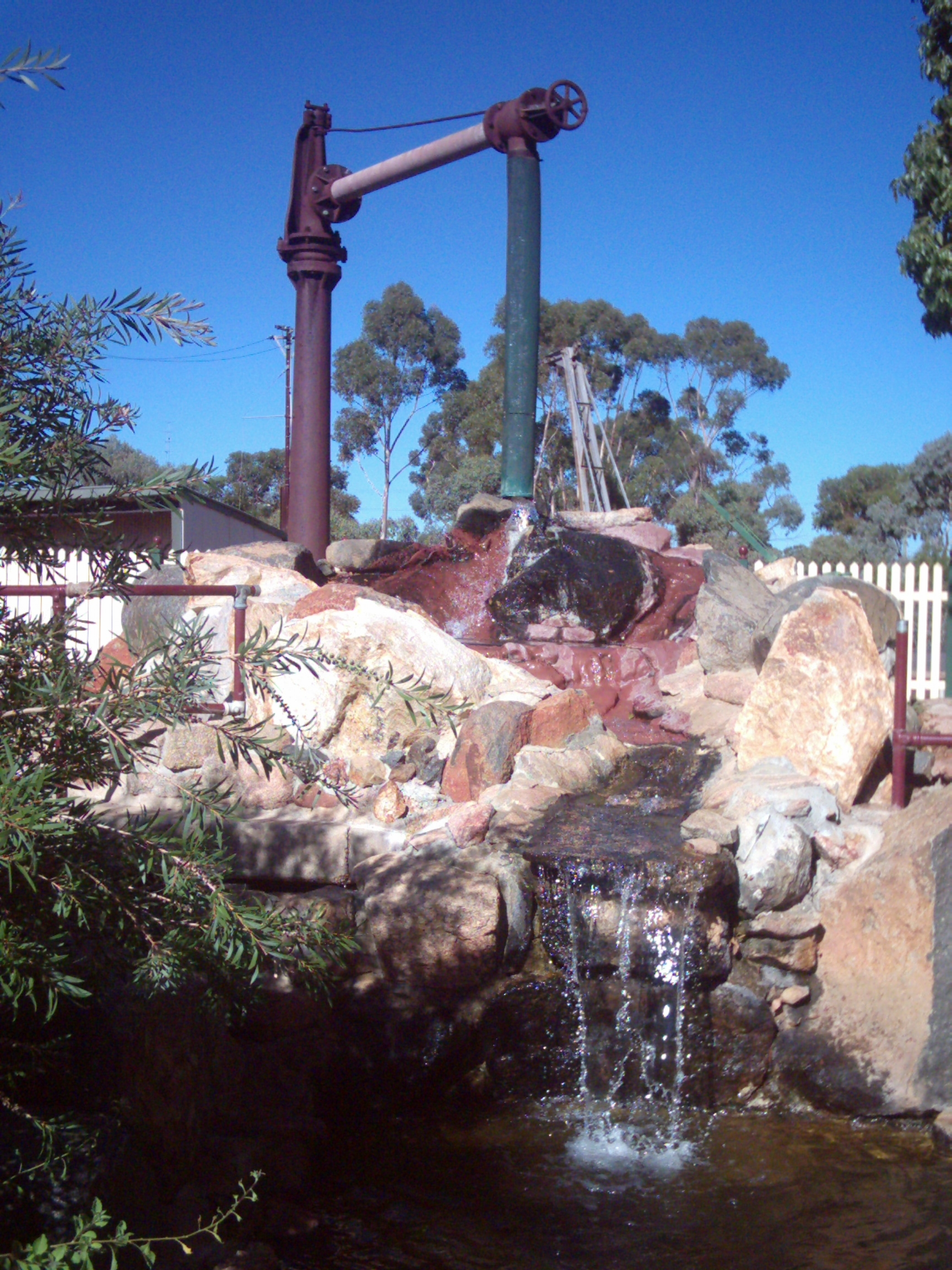
Stand pipe Brookton railway station

Brookton is located on Great Southern Highway, 138 kilometres (86 mi) east of Perth via Brookton Highway and is a key agricultural centre for a rich mixed farming district. In the 2016 census it reported a population of 975. It contains a TAFE centre, and in addition, a district high school (opened 1960, replacing a primary school), Bendigo Bank, shopping facilities, accommodation (hotel, motel, caravan park), council offices and a telecentre are located within the town. Bi-annually, it hosts the Old Time Motor Show.

The town is a stop on the Transwa bus service to Albany.

== Climate ==
Climate data for Brookton
Month	Jan	Feb	Mar	Apr	May	Jun	Jul	Aug	Sep	Oct	Nov	Dec	Year
Record high °C (°F)	45.2 (113.4)	46.2 (115.2)	41.0 (105.8)	37.8 (100.0)	34.5 (94.1)	25.0 (77.0)	24.0 (75.2)	26.8 (80.2)	33.4 (92.1)	37.9 (100.2)	41.4 (106.5)	43.5 (110.3)	46.2 (115.2)
Mean daily maximum °C (°F)	33.1 (91.6)	32.4 (90.3)	29.5 (85.1)	25.0 (77.0)	20.6 (69.1)	17.2 (63.0)	16.1 (61.0)	16.9 (62.4)	19.4 (66.9)	23.5 (74.3)	27.7 (81.9)	31.2 (88.2)	24.4 (75.9)
Mean daily minimum °C (°F)	15.5 (59.9)	16.0 (60.8)	14.4 (57.9)	11.2 (52.2)	7.7 (45.9)	5.5 (41.9)	4.6 (40.3)	4.6 (40.3)	5.4 (41.7)	7.6 (45.7)	11.1 (52.0)	13.6 (56.5)	9.8 (49.6)
Record low °C (°F)	6.5 (43.7)	5.0 (41.0)	3.0 (37.4)	1.1 (34.0)	−1.6 (29.1)	−2.9 (26.8)	−3.0 (26.6)	−2.6 (27.3)	−2.0 (28.4)	−2.0 (28.4)	−1.7 (28.9)	3.0 (37.4)	−3.0 (26.6)
Average precipitation mm (inches)	13.0 (0.51)	15.1 (0.59)	19.0 (0.75)	25.6 (1.01)	55.9 (2.20)	83.2 (3.28)	84.0 (3.31)	62.3 (2.45)	38.0 (1.50)	24.9 (0.98)	14.5 (0.57)	10.0 (0.39)	444.7 (17.51)
Average precipitation days	2.2	2.5	3.3	5.7	10.1	14.2	15.9	13.7	10.3	7.1	4.0	2.5	91.5
Average relative humidity (%)	29	34	37	45	53	62	66	61	55	41	32	28	45
