= Rail transport in Western Australia =

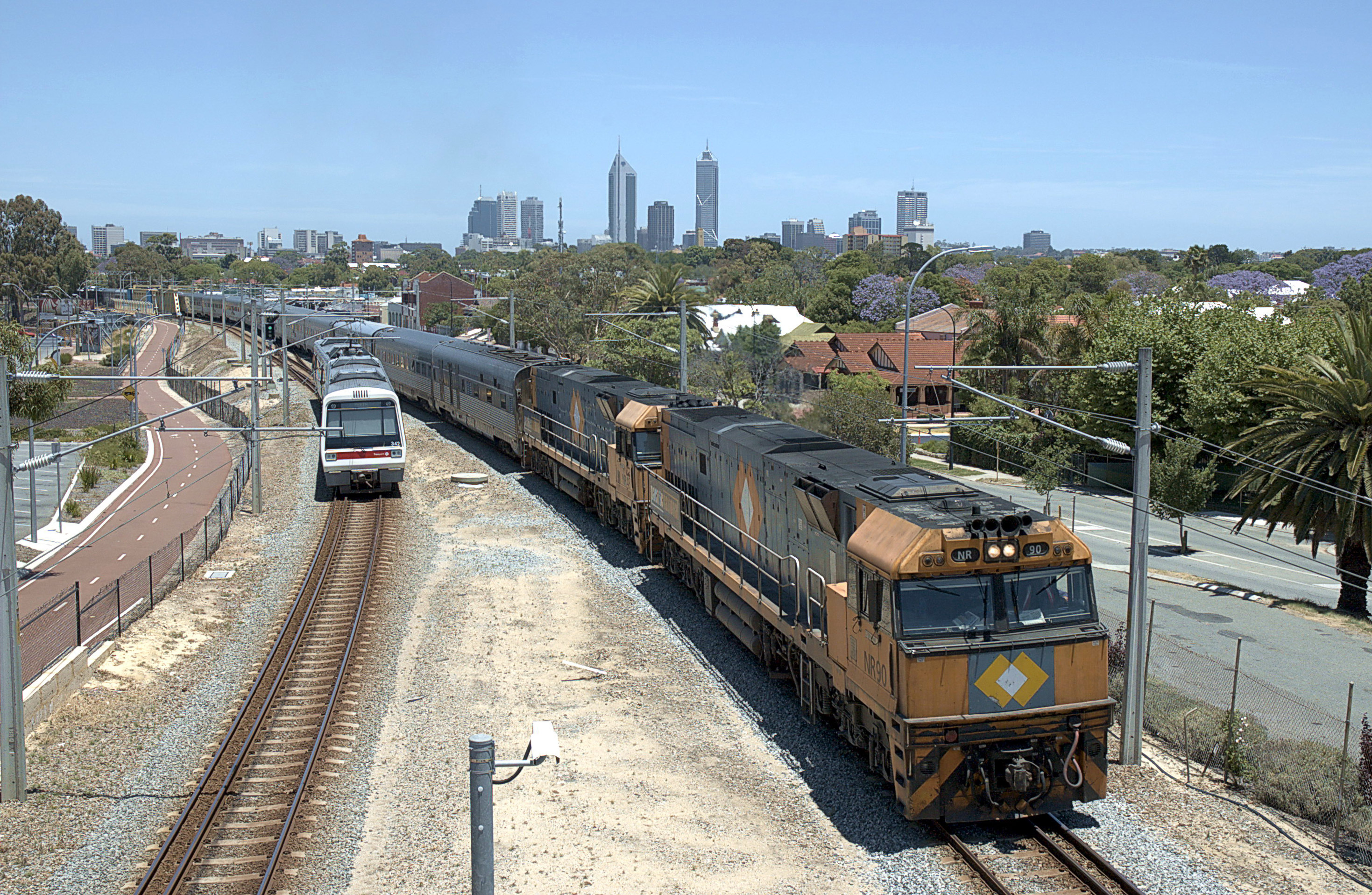
NR class hauled Indian Pacific departs Perth passing a narrow gauge Transperth suburban train to the left, both trains are on dual gauge track

Railways in Western Australia were developed in the 19th century both by the Government of Western Australia and a number of private companies. Today passenger rail services are controlled by the Public Transport Authority (a department of the Government of Western Australia) through Transperth that operates public transport in Perth, and Transwa that operates country passenger services. Journey Beyond operates the Indian Pacific.

The interstate standard gauge line east from Kalgoorlie is owned by the Australian Rail Track Corporation, with most other lines leased by the state to Arc Infrastructure.

Freight rail was privatised in 2000. General intrastate freight is mainly operated by Aurizon, while grain traffic is also operated by Aurizon under contract to the CBH Group. Interstate traffic is operated by Pacific National and SCT Logistics. Aurizon also operate an interstate mineral sands service to Kwinana from Broken Hill for Tronox. A number of private iron ore haulage railways also operate in the Pilbara region of the state.

== History ==
The Western Australian lines developed in narrow 3 ft 6 in (1,067 mm) gauge from Fremantle (the port of Perth), Geraldton, Bunbury, Albany and Esperance, mainly for carrying grain and minerals, with the private Midland Railway Company and Great Southern Railway adding 3 ft 6 in (1,067 mm) gauge lines in the Wheatbelt with the support of land grants.

In 1907, the standard-gauge Trans-Australian Railway from Port Augusta, South Australia to Kalgoorlie was authorised. Construction started in 1912, and it was completed in 1917. It was run by the Commonwealth Railways. In the 1960s standard (1,435 mm (4 ft 8 1/2 in)) gauge lines penetrated to Perth and Esperance and long distance heavy-haul railways were built in the Pilbara region by major iron mining companies, particularly BHP and Hamersley Iron. The Perth suburban lines were electrified and extended.

Government railways were controlled by the Department of Works and Railways from 1877.

The department became Western Australian Government Railways (WAGR) in 1890. WAGR became Westrail in 1975 and continued to manage both passenger and freight rail services in Western Australia until 2000, when the freight business was sold to the Australian Railroad Group who operated it under the Australian Western Railroad brand. This business was purchased by Queensland Rail in 2006 and rebranded Aurizon in 2013. Westrail's freight rail lines were leased to WestNet Rail, another subsidiary of the Australian Railroad Group. This business was acquired by Babcock & Brown in 2006 and sold again in 2010 to Brookfield Asset Management and rebranded Brookfield Rail. In July 2017 it was again rebranded as Arc Infrastructure.

The WAGR's remaining functions, including owning the rail network and operating regional passenger services were transferred to the Western Australian Government Railways Commission. On 1 January 2003, the commission's functions were absorbed by the Public Transport Authority with passenger services operated under the Transwa brand.

The locomotive Ballarat in the sand at Wonnerup, 1921. Reputed to be the oldest in Western Australia, the engine now sits in St Marys Park, Busselton.

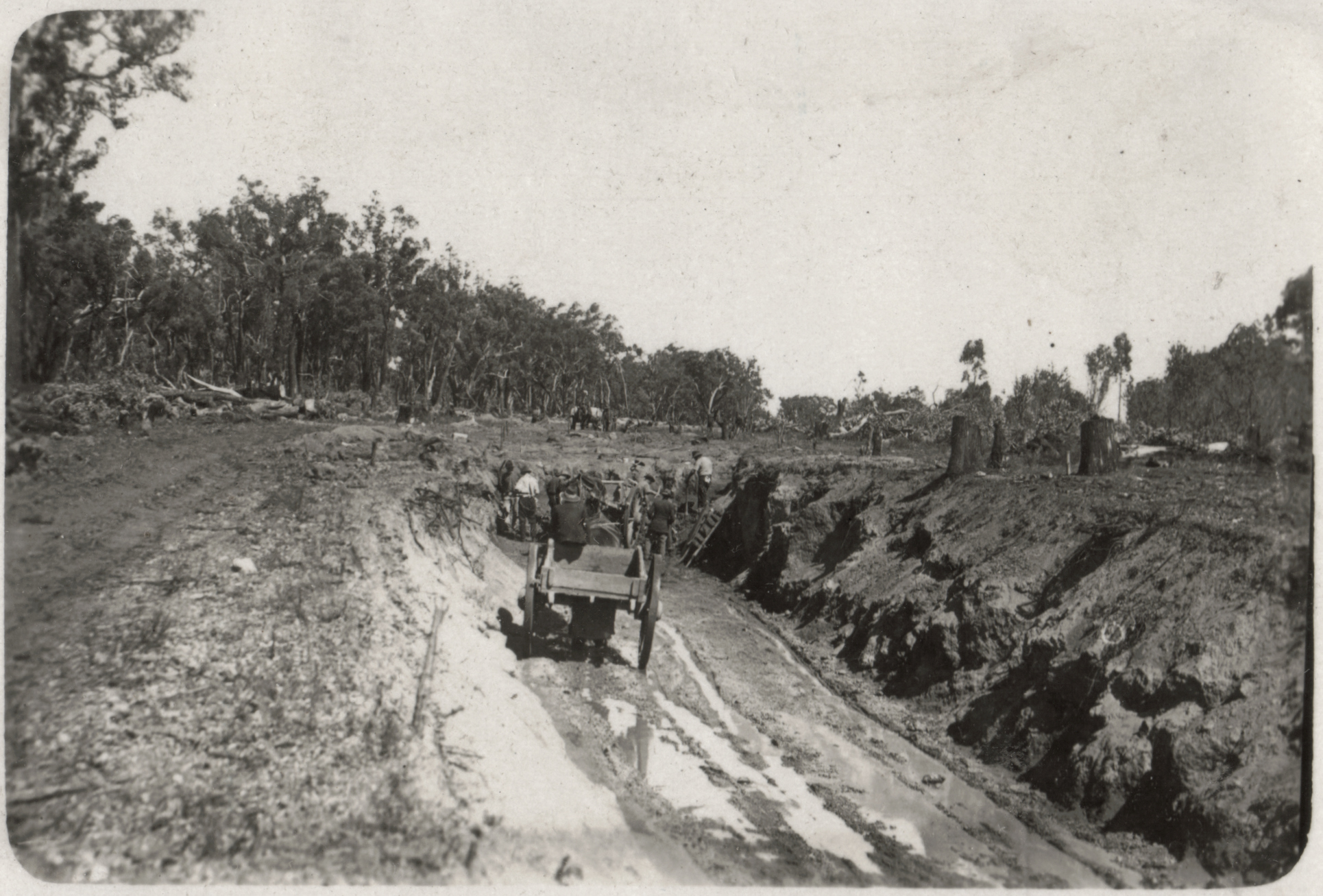
Railway construction in Western Australia around 1926

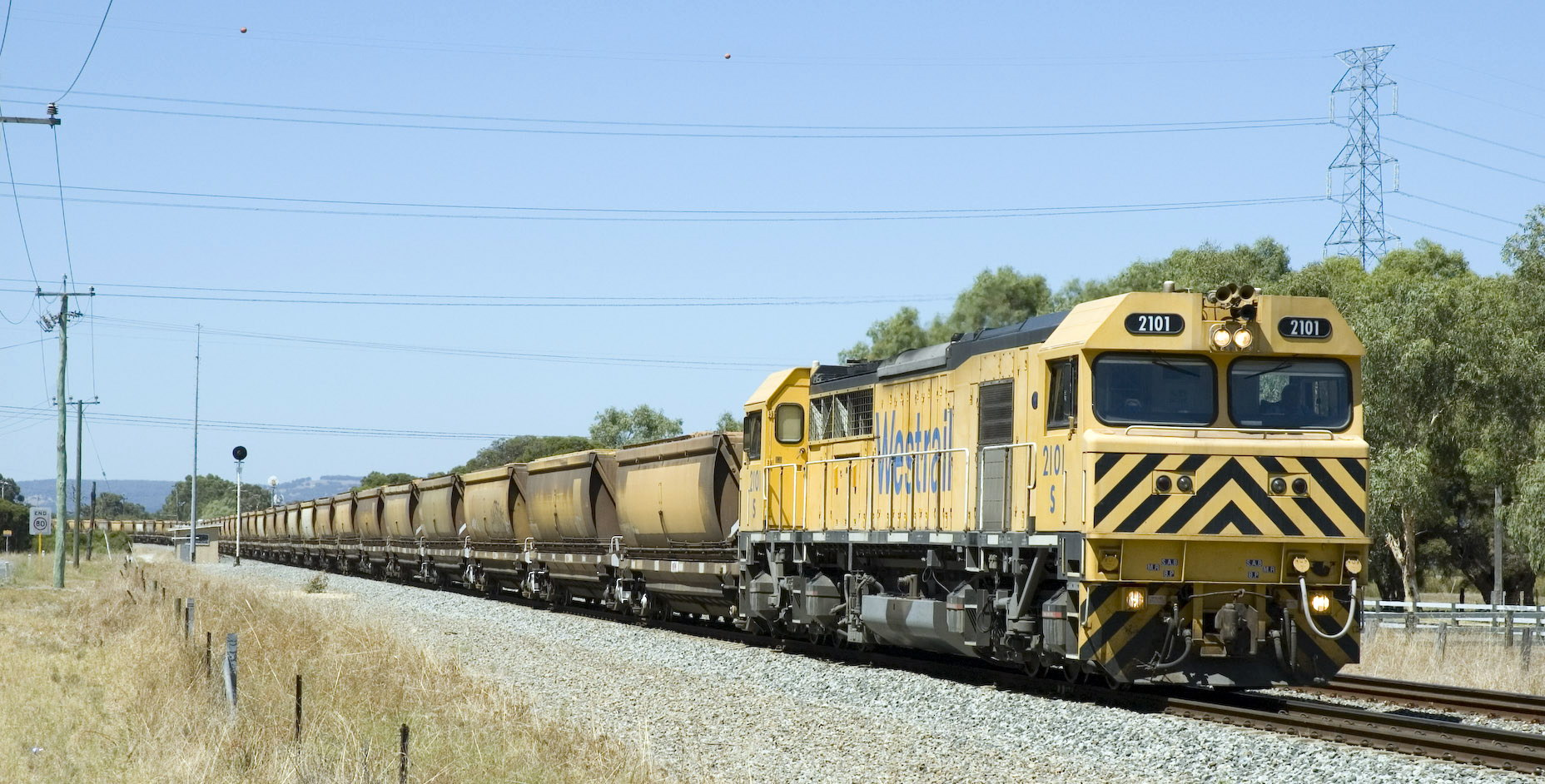
Modern S class diesel locomotive on a bauxite train at Wellard

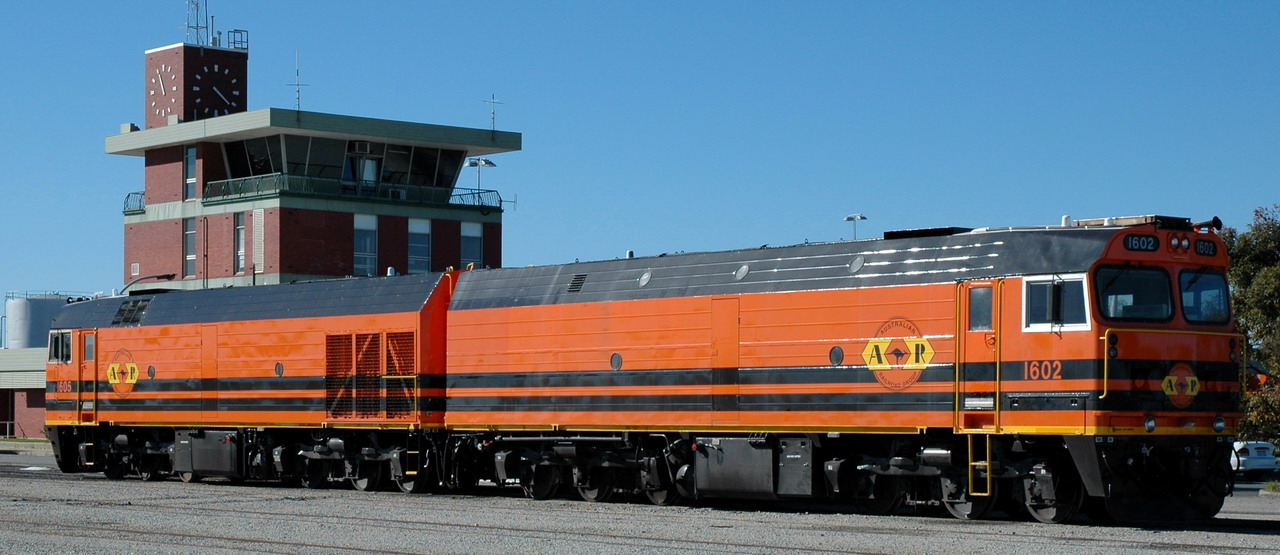
Australian Railroad Group 1600 class locomotives at Forrestfield

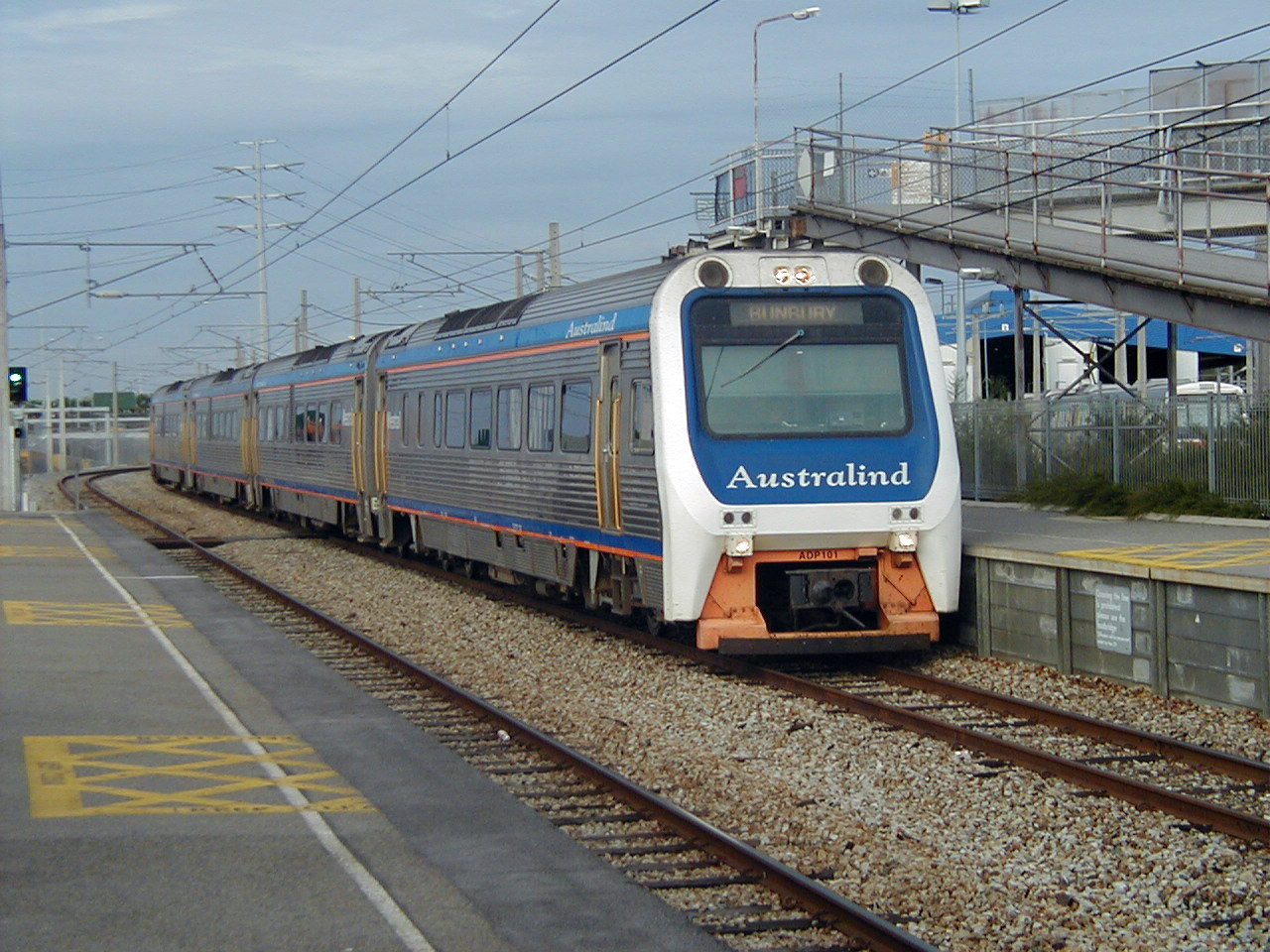
Australind at Claisebrook station

=== Timeline ===
The timeline can be considered in terms of events, or eras. May and Gray's History of Passenger Carriages chapters offer an insight into a set of decades or slightly longer stages of railway development.

- 1877–1890: Early Years
- 1891–1900: Gold and the boom years
- 1901–1910: Continued expansion and consolidation
- 1911–1930: War and roaring twenties
- 1931–1944: Depression and another war
- 1945–1958: Post war reconstruction, but the rot sets in
- 1959–1975: An Indian summer
- 1976–present: Just a shadow

=== By years ===
- 1871: Private Ballaarat tramline opens from Lockville to Yoganup, south of Perth
- 1879: WAGR railway 1,067 mm (3 ft 6 in) gauge line opens between Geraldton and Northampton
- 1881: Eastern line opens from Fremantle to Perth and Guildford
- 1893: South Western line opens from Perth to Bunbury
- 1894: Midland Railway Company opens the Midland line from Midland Junction to Walkaway, connecting with the WAGR line to Geraldton
- 1896: Eastern Goldfields line reaches Kalgoorlie
- 1917: Standard gauge Trans-Australian Railway connects eastern Australia with Western Australia, with a break-of-gauge at Kalgoorlie
- 1968: Kalgoorlie to Perth standard gauge line opens. (Lines east of Merredin converted to standard gauge, including Kalgoorlie-Esperance & Kalgoorlie-Leonora. North and south of Merredin remains narrow gauge only. West of Northam becomes dual gauge.)
- 1970: Inaugural Indian Pacific service, revamped passenger service from Perth to Sydney via Adelaide.
- 1986: Electrification of Perth suburban lines from with a 25 kV AC overhead power supply commences
- 1993: Northern Suburbs Transit System commences operation with a new line opened from Joondalup to Perth
- 2007: The Mandurah line opens as part of the New MetroRail project, which also included construction of the Thornlie spur and Greenwood station
- 2010: the Metro Area Express was announced. The project would have introduced light rail to Perth along some of the former tram routes. The project was abandoned in 2016.
- 2017: Metronet formed to manage extensions to the Perth rail system including the Thornlie-Cockburn link.
- 2022: Completion of the Forrestfield-Airport link connecting the airport to the metropolitan passenger rail network via Bayswater station.

=== First lines ===
Private railways for carrying timber were built south of Perth from Lockville (just north of Busselton) to Yoganup in 1871, and from Rockingham to Jarrahdale soon after.

The first government railway in the State was a 3 ft 6 in (1,067 mm) gauge line between Geraldton and Northampton and was opened in 1879 to transport lead and copper to port. It closed in 1957.

The WAGR opened the Eastern line from Fremantle to Perth and Guildford in 1881. It was extended to Chidlow in 1884, York in 1885 and Beverley in 1886. Branch lines were built to Belmont, Northam and Toodyay by 1888.

=== Southern lines ===
The Beverley line was extended to Albany in 1889 by the Great Southern Railway, which was taken over by WAGR in 1896. The South Western Railway was built from Perth to Bunbury in 1893, with branches to Collie(1898), Flinders Bay (1925) and Northcliffe (1933).

=== Northern lines ===
The Midland Railway Company opened a line from Midland Junction to Walkaway in 1894, where it met the WAGR line from Geraldton opened in 1887. It was acquired by the WAGR in 1964.

=== Goldfields line ===
The Northam line was extended to Southern Cross in 1894 and Coolgardie and Kalgoorlie in 1896. This line connected with the standard gauge Trans-Australian Railway to eastern Australia in 1917 at a break-of-gauge. The replacement standard gauge line opened in 1968.

=== Isolated branch lines ===
The Western Australian Government Railways had two isolated branches:

The isolated Marble Bar Railway was opened in July 1911. The last train to run out of Port Hedland operated on 25 October 1951, with the railway closed on 31 October 1951.

The Hopetoun to Ravensthorpe railway line was an isolated branch opened on 3 June 1909, and closed on 23 February 1935. The Hopetoun jetty line was handed over to the Harbour and Light Department on 1 January 1936. It was officially closed on 13 January 1946.

== Operations ==
=== Perth suburban network ===
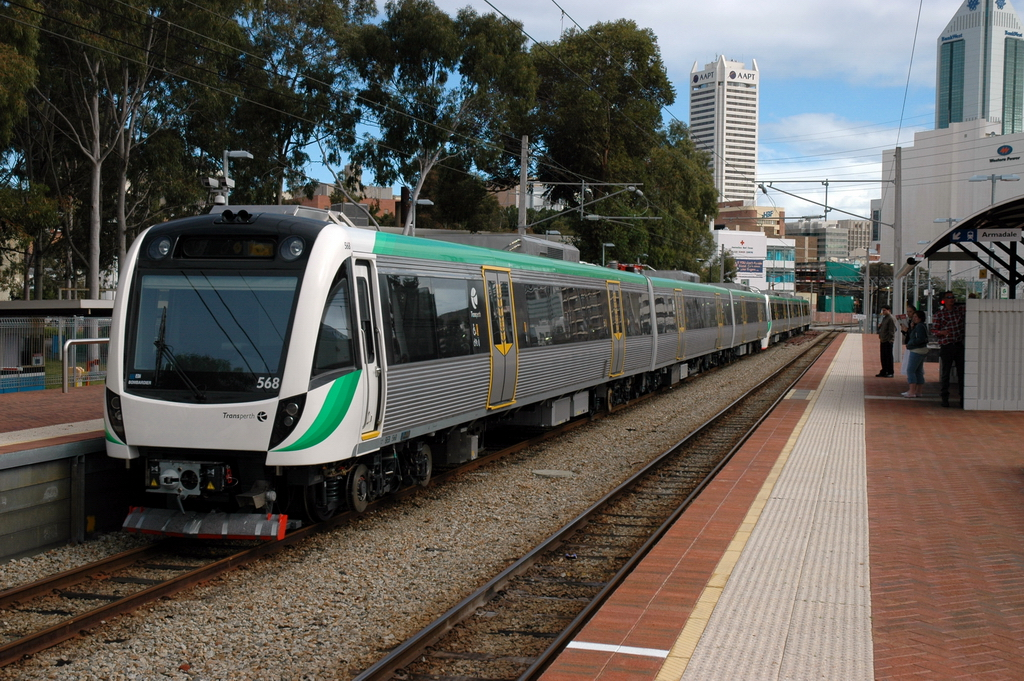
Transperth B-series train at McIver station

- In 1982, public protest led to the reopening of the Fremantle railway, beginning a new era of the metropolitan rail policy. In 1991 Perth completed the electrification of its existing railway lines, utilising electric multiple units and a 25 kV AC overhead power supply system.
- In 1993, the Northern Suburbs Transit System commenced operations.
- 2007 saw the completion of the New MetroRail project.

=== Regional passenger ===
Transwa controls public transport services outside of Perth, including passenger services from Perth to Kalgoorlie, Northam and Bunbury. These trains are named the Prospector, AvonLink, and Australind.

Great Southern Rail operates the Indian Pacific from Perth to Adelaide and Sydney.

=== Pilbara iron ore lines ===
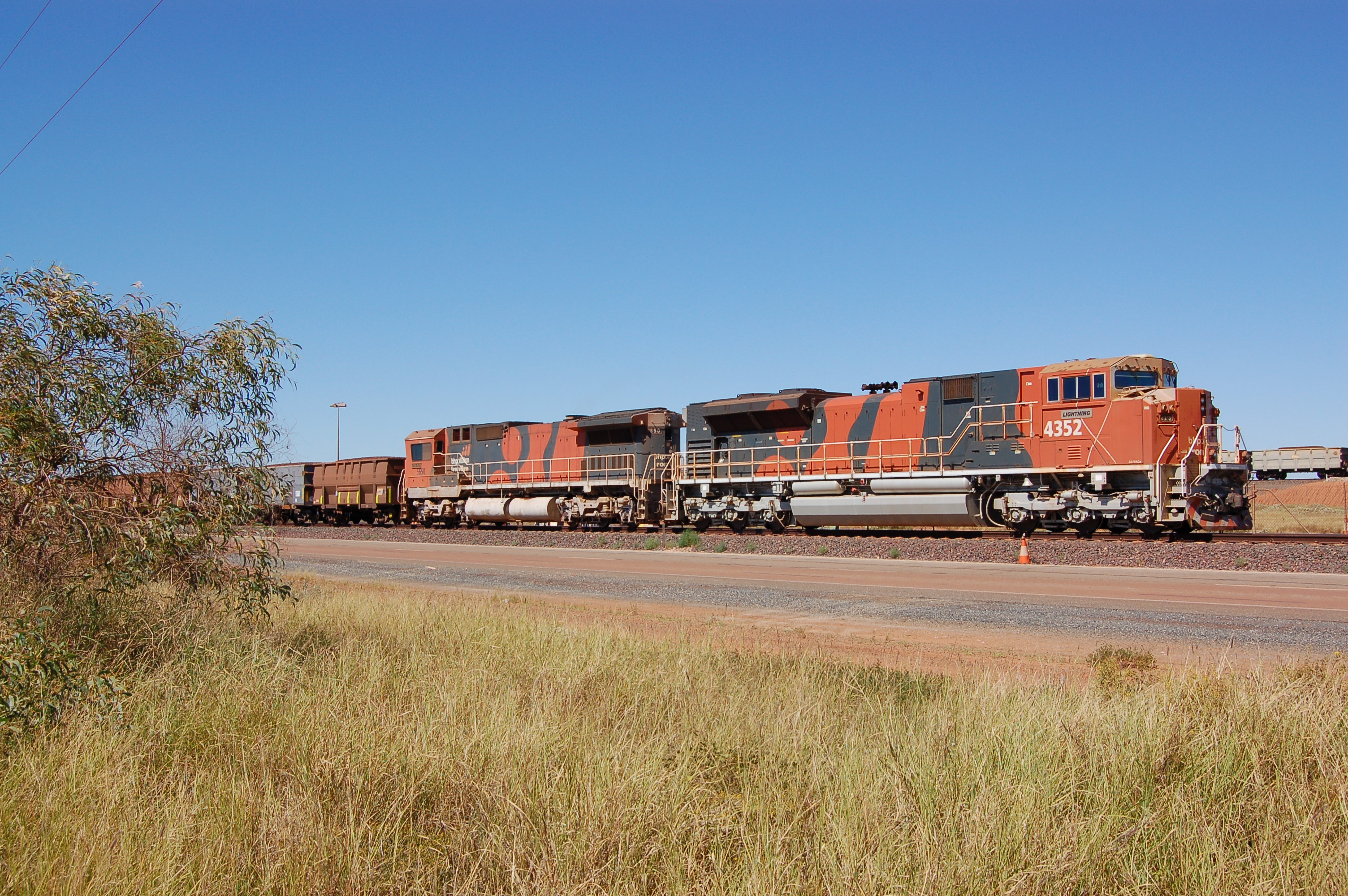
A loaded BHP Billiton Iron Ore train at Boodarie, near Port Hedland. A Fortescue iron ore train is just visible in the background at right.

Four isolated heavy duty railways for the cartage of iron ore in the Pilbara region have always been private concerns operated as part of the production line between mine and port. These lines have pushed the limit of the wheel to rail interface which has led to much useful research of value to railways worldwide.

In April 2008, Fortescue opened the Fortescue railway line from Cloud Break mine to Port Hedland. In 2016, Hancock Prospecting opened a line from Roy Hill.

Another iron ore line has been proposed to the port of Oakajee, this will have open access to any iron ore mine wishing to use it. A dual gauge network based on the new Oakajee Port north of Geraldton has been proposed by the Department of Transport.

In 2010, Rio Tinto announced plans to expand capacity on the railway line linking its iron ore mines to Dampier; this would increase capacity to 230 million tonnes (510 billion pounds) per year, to meet increasing demand for iron ore.

The railway lines are:

- Hamersley & Robe River railway line (Rio Tinto)
- Mount Newman railway line (BHP)
- Goldsworthy railway line (BHP)
- Fortescue railway line (FMG)
- Roy Hill railway line (Hancock)

== Rail revival in Perth ==
In March 2010 the Perth City Link Rail Master Plan was published, within; the increasing operational and capacity requirements demanded from the city's public transportation system by the community was acknowledged, and a robust framework outlining steps, to be taken by the Public Transport Authority of Western Australia, to meet these demands was established.

The rail system in Perth has not always attracted the level of government resources and support from the community which it now receives (evinced in the recent Master Plans targeting its expansion). As recently as the early 80s, Perth's rail system was embattled, with a rail corridor linking the city with a nearby port and residential district closing in 1979, to prepare for the development of a major road in its place. This minor war between road and rail over land reserve in Perth culminated in 1983 with a group of people, including Professor Peter Newman, defending the public transport corridor.

They managed to stop the reallocation of the Perth to Fremantle rail reserve to road reserve, and the rail line which had been closed in 1979 to make room for the major highway was reopened to the public shortly after, in 1983. 3 years later, in 1986, the first Master Plan for the rail system was prepared, and in 1988, the public, planners and policy-makers were outspoken in their preference for a new rail system to link Perth to the Northern suburbs, instead of the decidedly short-term solution of a bus-way advocated by the consultants commissioned to find the most affordable transit solution.

Five railway Master Plans have since been produced, and in the 2010 report these plans are credited for ensuring the provision of infrastructure and rolling stock to improve and expand the suburban rail system in Perth. Patronage of the Perth to Fremantle train line, which had initially been shut down in 1979 to prepare for the development of a highway on the site, has grown substantially between the 1980s and 2010, with current daily patronage levels for this single rail line (approximately 23,000 journeys per day) coming close to the total patronage of the rail line in 1989 going through the city station (approximately 25,000 ).

The progression of public, planner and policy-maker attitudes in Perth, away from automobile and road infrastructure dependence, according to one researcher, has led to the following familiar scene in the city:

Cars sit in congestion on the freeway, delayed by the construction of a railway line through the southern suburbs to the coast town of Mandurah [...].

Far from the segregation of land uses advertised by Hoyt in 1943, the turn toward the expansion of the Perth rail system has also been accompanied by the advancing of New Urbanism leaning "Liveable Neighbourhood" policies, promoting mixed density development, walkable communities and sustainable transportation, potentially demarcating a departure from automotive city planning features for the city.

== See also ==
- Rail transport in Australia
- Railway accidents in Western Australia
- History of rail transport in Australia
- List of Western Australian locomotive classes
- Closed railway stations in Western Australia
- List of Western Australian railway-related acts
