= Goodenia sericostachya =

Silky-spiked goodenia

Conservation status
- Priority Three — Poorly Known Taxa (DEC)

Scientific classification
- Kingdom: Plantae
- Clade: Tracheophytes
- Clade: Angiosperms
- Clade: Eudicots
- Clade: Asterids
- Order: Asterales
- Family: Goodeniaceae
- Genus: Goodenia
- Species: G. sericostachya

Binomial name
- Goodenia sericostachya C.A.Gardner

Species of plant

Goodenia sericostachya, commonly known as silky-spiked goodenia, is a species of flowering plant in the family Goodeniaceae and is endemic to a restricted area in the west of Western Australia. It is an erect herb or shrub with silvery hairs, lance-shaped to egg-shaped leaves at the base of the plant and thyrses of blue to pinkish-mauve flowers.

== Description ==
Goodenia sericostachya is an erect, short-lived or perennial herb that typically grows to a height of 40 cm (16 in) and is covered with silvery hairs. The leaves at the base of the plant are lance-shaped to egg-shaped with the narrower end towards the base, 50–100 mm (2.0–3.9 in) long and 20–25 mm (0.79–0.98 in) wide. The flowers are arranged in spikes or thyrses up to 150 mm (5.9 in) long, with bracts up to 10 mm (0.39 in) long and bracteoles about 6 mm (0.24 in) long. The sepals are linear, about 5 mm (0.20 in) long, the petals blue to pinkish mauve with a yellow spot, about 15 mm (0.59 in) long. The lower lobes of the corolla are about 8 mm (0.31 in) long with wings about 0.5 mm (0.020 in) wide. Flowering occurs from October to December or January.

== Taxonomy and naming ==
Goodenia sericostachya was first formally described in 1964 Charles Gardner in the Journal of the Royal Society of Western Australia from specimens he collected near the Murchison River in 1960. The specific epithet (sericostachya) means "silky flower spike".

== Distribution and habitat ==
This goodenia grows on sandplains, germinating after fire, between Yuna and the lower reaches of the Murchison River in the Carnarvon, Geraldton Sandplains and Yalgoo biogeographic regions of Western Australia.

== Conservation status ==
Goodenia sericostachya is classified is classified as "Priority Three" by the Government of Western Australia Department of Parks and Wildlife meaning that it is poorly known and known from only a few locations but is not under imminent threat.
