= Banksia borealis =

Scientific classification
- Kingdom: Plantae
- Clade: Tracheophytes
- Clade: Angiosperms
- Clade: Eudicots
- Order: Proteales
- Family: Proteaceae
- Genus: Banksia
- Subgenus: Banksia subg. Banksia
- Series: Banksia ser. Dryandra
- Species: B. borealis

Binomial name
- Banksia borealis (A.S.George) A.R.Mast & K.R.Thiele

Synonyms
- Dryandra borealis A.S.George

Species of shrub endemic to Western Australia

Banksia borealis is a species of sprawling shrub that is endemic to Western Australia. It has leaves with sharply pointed lobes on each side, between thirty and fifty flowers in a gold-coloured spike and egg-shaped fruit. There are two subspecies occurring in two disjunct areas.

== Description ==
Banksia borealis is a sprawling shrub that typically grows to a height of 1 m (3 ft 3 in) and forms a lignotuber, or a shrub to 2.5 m (8 ft 2 in) that does not form a lignotuber. The stems have soft hairs held close to the surface. The leaves are broadly linear in outline, 40–90 mm (1.6–3.5 in) long and 12–30 mm (0.47–1.18 in) wide on a petiole up to 2 mm (0.079 in) long, with between five and twelve sharply pointed lobes on each side. Between thirty and fifty flowers are borne in a spike on the end of short side branches, each flower with a hairy, golden perianth 32–35 mm (1.3–1.4 in) long, the pistil 39–47 mm (1.5–1.9 in) long. Flowering occurs from July to November and the fruit is a hairy, egg-shaped follicle 8–13 mm (0.31–0.51 in) long.

== Taxonomy and naming ==
This banksia was first formally described in 1996 by Alex George in the journal Nuytsia and given the name Dryandra borealis from specimens he collected in 1966, near the road between Kalbarri and Ajana. In 2007, Austin Mast and Kevin Thiele transferred all the dryandras to the genus Banksia and this species became Banksia borealis. The specific epithet (borealis) is a Latin word meaning "northern" referring to the distribution of this species, the most northerly of all the dryandras.

In the same journal, George described two subspecies of Dryandra borealis, later moved to Banksia by Mast and Thiele, and the names are accepted by the Australian Plant Census:

- Banksia borealis A.S.George subsp. borealis is a shrub with a lignotuber;
- Banksia borealis subsp. elatior A.S.George lacks a lignotuber.

== Distribution and habitat ==
Banksia borealis occurs in two disjunct areas of Western Australia. Subspecies borealis is relatively common and grows in Kwongan between Kalbarri, Northampton and Yuna. Subspecies elatior is only known from a few small populations near Three Springs where it grows in tall scrub and low woodland.

== Conservation status ==
Subspecies borealis is classified as "not threatened" by the Western Australian Government Department of Parks and Wildlife, but subspecies elatior is classified as "Priority Three" meaning that it is poorly known and known from only a few locations but is not under imminent threat.
