= List of acts of the Parliament of Western Australia from 1933 =

This is a list of acts of the Parliament of Western Australia for the year 1933.

== 1933 ==
Short title, or popular name	Citation	Royal assent
Long title
	No. 1 of 1933; 24 Geo. V. No. 1	16 August 1933
An Act to apply out of the Consolidated Revenue Fund the sum of Nine Hundred Thousand Pounds, and from Moneys to Credit of the General Loan Fund Three Hundred Thousand Pounds, to the Service of the Year ending 30th June, 1934, and to apply out of the Public Account the sum of Three Hundred Thousand Pounds for the purpose of temporary Advances to be made by the Treasurer.
York Cemeteries Act 1933	No. 2 of 1933; 24 Geo. V. No. 2	16 September 1933
An Act to revest certain lands in His Majesty, and for other purposes relative thereto.
Fremantle Municipal Tramways and Electric Lighting Act Amendment Act 1933	No. 4 of 1933; 24 Geo. V. No. 4	26 September 1933
An Act to further amend the Fremantle Municipal Tramways and Electric Lighting Act, 1903. (Note: Fremantle Municipal Tramways and Electric Lighting Act 1903 (Private Act of 1903))
Yuna–Dartmoor Railway Act 1933	No. 23 of 1933; 24 Geo. V. No. 23	24 November 1933
An Act to authorise the construction of a railway from Yuna to Dartmoor.
Southern Cross Southwards Railway Act 1933	No. 24 of 1933; 24 Geo. V. No. 24	24 November 1933
An Act to authorise the construction of a railway from Southern Cross Southwards.
State Transport Co-ordination Act 1933	No. 42 of 1933; 24 Geo. V. No. 42	4 January 1934
An Act to provide for the Improvement and for the Co-ordination of means of and facilities for Transport.
	No. X of 1933	
Constitution Acts Amendment Act 1931 Continuance Act 1933	No. 46 of 1933; 24 Geo. V. No. 46	4 January 1934
An Act to continue the operation of the Constitution Acts Amendment Act, 1931. (Note: Constitution Acts Amendment Act 1931 (No. 11))

== Sources ==
- "legislation.wa.gov.au".
