= List of acts of the Parliament of Western Australia from 1909 =

This is a list of acts of the Parliament of Western Australia for the year 1909.

== 1909 ==
| Short title, or popular name | Citation | Royal assent |
Long title
| | No. 1 of 1909 | 16 January 1909 |
An Act to alter the Boundaries of the Midland J unction Municipal District, by including therein portion of the Swan Road District.
| Bridgetown–Wilgarrup Railway Act 1909 | No. 2 of 1909 | 16 January 1909 |
An Act to authorise the Construction of a Railway from Bridgetown to Wilgarrup.
| Upper Chapman Railway Act 1909 | No. 3 of 1909 | 16 January 1909 |
An Act to authorise the Construction of a Railway to the Upper Chapman Valley.
| Nannine–Meekatharra Railway Act 1909 | No. 6 of 1909 | 6 February 1909 |
An Act to authorise the Construction of a Railway from Nannine to Meekatharra.
| North Perth Tramways Act 1909 | No. 35 of 1909 | 21 December 1909 |
An Act to confirm a further Provisional Order to amend and vary a certain Provisional Order authorising the Construction of Tramways in the Municipality of North Perth.
| | Provisional Order. | |
| Boyup–Kojonup Railway Act 1909 | No. 38 of 1909 | 21 December 1909 |
An Act to authorise the Construction of a Railway from Boyup to Kojonup.
| Goomalling–Wongan Hills Railway Act 1909 | No. 41 of 1909 | 21 December 1909 |
An Act to authorise the Construction of a Railway from Goomalling to Wongan Hills.
| Dowerin–Merredin Railway Act 1909 | No. 42 of 1909 | 21 December 1909 |
An Act to authorise the Construction of a Railway from Dowerin to Merredin
| Leonora Tramways Act 1909 | No. 48 of 1909 | 21 December 1909 |
An Act to confirm a Provisional Order authorising the construction of certain Tramways in the Municipal District of Leonora and in the North Coolgardie Road District, and to repeal the Leonora Tramway Act, 1902. (Note: Leonora Tramway Act 1902 (2 Edw. VII. No. 28))
| | Provisional Order. | |
| | No. X of 1909 | |
| Employment Brokers Act 1909 | No. 57 of 1909 | 21 December 1909 |
An Act for the Regulation of Employment Brokers.
| | No. 58 of 1909 | 21 December 1909 |
An Act to appropriate and apply out of the Consolidated Revenue Fund and from Moneys to Credit of the Trust Fund, the General Loan Fund, and the Loan Suspense Account certain sums to make good the supplies granted for the Service of the Year ending the thirtieth day of June, One thousand nine hundred and ten, and to supplement grants made by the present Parliament during its last Session in adjustment of the Vote "Advance to Treasurer, 1908-9," for charges during the Year ended the 30th day of June, 1909.

== Sources ==
- "legislation.wa.gov.au".
