= List of acts of the Legislative Council of Western Australia from 1873 =

This is a list of acts of the Legislative Council of Western Australia for the year 1873.

== 1873 ==
Short title, or popular name	Citation	Royal assent
Long title
	37 Vict. No. 1	3 July 1873
An Act to amend the Law concerning Warrants of Distress.
	37 Vict. No. 2	8 July 1873
An Act to confirm the Expenditure for the services of the year One thousand eight hundred and seventy-two beyond the grant for that year.
Auctioneers' Act 1873	37 Vict. No. 3	8 July 1873
An Act to Repeal the Duties on Sales by Auction and to impose a new Duty on the License to be taken out by all Auctioneers in Western Australia.
Delivery of Prisoners Act 1873	37 Vict. No. 4	8 July 1873
An Act to remove some defects in the Administration of the Criminal Law.
	37 Vict. No. 5	8 July 1873
An Act to alter the Act (Note: 4 & 5 Vict. No. 13) to impose a Duty on the Transfer of Landed Property.
	37 Vict. No. 6	11 July 1873
An Act to further regulate the importation of Cattle Sheep or Pigs. (Repealed by Imported Stock Act 1876 (40 Vict. No. 14))
Railway Survey Act 1873	37 Vict. No. 7	11 July 1873
An Act to facilitate the Survey of Lands for Railway purposes.
	37 Vict. No. 8	11 July 1873
An Act for adopting and applying (with certain modifications and exceptions) an Act of Parliament intituled "An Act to abolish Forfeitures for Treason and Felony and to otherwise amend the law relating thereto" in the Administration of Justice in the Colony of Western Australia. (Note: Forfeiture Act 1870 (33 & 34 Vict. c. 23 (Imp)))
	37 Vict. No. 9	24 July 1873
An Act to amend "The Wines Beer and Spirit Sale Act 1872." (Note: Wines, Beer, and Spirit Sale Act 1872 (36 Vict. No. 5))
Northern District Special Revenue Act 1873	37 Vict. No. 10	24 July 1873
An Act to raise a local revenue in the Northern District of Western Australia to be expended in the better protection of persons employed in various industries on the Coast of that District and for other purposes.
Pearl Shell Fishery Regulation Act 1873	37 Vict. No. 11	24 July 1873
An Act to repeal an Act intituled "An Act to regulate, the hiring and service of Aboriginal Natives employed in the Pearl Shell Fishery ; and to prohibit the employment of Women therein," (Note: 34 Vict. No. 14) and to make other provisions in lieu thereof.
Imperial Acts (Masters and Apprentices) Adopting Act 1873	37 Vict. No. 12	24 July 1873
An Act to declare the Law relating to Masters and Apprentices.
Cart Licensing Act 1873	37 Vict. No. 13	29 July 1873
An Act for Licensing Carts.
	37 Vict. No. 14	29 July 1873
An Act to alter and extend the provisions of "The Shipping and Pilotage Consolidation Ordinance, 1855," (Note: Shipping and Pilotage Consolidation Ordinance 1855 (18 Vict. No. 15)) (18th Victoria, No. 15.)
Law and Parliamentary Library Act 1873	37 Vict. No. 15	29 July 1873
An Act to make provision for the establishment of a Law and Parliamentary Library.
	37 Vict. No. 16	29 July 1873
An Act to repeal two Ordinances intituled respectively "An Ordinance to regulate the Temporal Affairs of Churches and Chapels of the United Church of England and Ireland in Western Australia," (Note: 16 Vict. No. 22) and "An Ordinance to amend an Ordinance intituled 'An Ordinance to regulate the Temporal Affairs of Churches and Chapels of the United Church of England and Ireland in Western Australia.'" (Note: 24 Vict. No. 4)
	37 Vict. No. 17	2 August 1873
An Act to make Provision for the Sale of certain Lands heretofore vested in the Treasurer of the Pensioners' Benevolent Society.
	37 Vict. No. 18	2 August 1873
An Act to appropriate the sum of One Hundred and Fourteen Thousand Four Hundred and Twenty-one Pounds Two Shillings and Sixpence (Note: £114,421 2s 6d in 1873 is equivalent to A$19,400,000 in 2022.) out of the General Revenue of the Colony for the Service of the year One thousand eight hundred and seventy-four.
Public Works Loan Act 1873	37 Vict. No. 19	15 January 1847 (Note: Royal assent delayed as the act was reserved for approval by Her Majesty, rather than by the governor.)
An Act for Raising the sum of One Hundred Thousand Pounds by Loan for the Construction of certain Public Works.
Railways Act 1873	37 Vict. No. 20	22 November 1873
An Act to make provision for the construction and maintenance of Railways authorised by any Act of the Legislature
Geraldton and Northampton Railway Act 1873	37 Vict. No. 21	22 November 1873
An Act to authorise the Construction of a Railway from Geraldton to Northampton out of moneys authorised to be raised by "The Public Works Loan Act, 1873." (Note: Public Works Loan Act 1873 (37 Vict. No. 19))
Legislative Council Act Amendment Act 1873	37 Vict. No. 22	15 January 1847
An Act to increase the number of Members to serve in the Legislative Council and further to regulate Elections.

== Sources ==
- "legislation.wa.gov.au".
