= Nabawa, Western Australia =

Town in the Mid West region of Western Australia

Nabawa
- Town
- Interactive map of Nabawa
- Coordinates: 28.500°S 114.789°E
- Country: Australia
- State: Western Australia
- LGA: Shire of Chapman Valley
- Location: 463 km (288 mi) N of Perth; 42 km (26 mi) NE of Geraldton
- Established: 1897

Government
  - State electorate: Geraldton
  - Federal division: Durack

Area
  - Total: 96.7 km^{2} (37.3 sq mi)

Population
  - Total: 118 (SAL 2021)
- Postcode: 6532

Nabawa is a small town in the Mid West region of Western Australia, and is located in the Shire of Chapman Valley 42 kilometres (26 mi) northeast of the city of Geraldton.

== History ==
Nabawa derives its name from Nabawar Pool, a pool in the Chapman River first recorded by a surveyor in 1857. This Aboriginal word is said to mean "camp far away". The current spelling of Nabawa has been in use since 1872.

A Roman Catholic Assisted School was established in 1889. When the Upper Chapman Valley railway line was opened in 1910, a siding was opened near the pool and named Nabawa. The railway closed in 1961, but in 1964, the Shire of Chapman Valley moved its administrative headquarters to Nabawa from Nanson, and a townsite was declared in 1965.

== Present day ==
The town contains Shire offices, a library, a community centre and playground, sport centre and oval, tavern, centenary park, St John Ambulance subcentre, Fire & Emergency Services subcentre and the Chapman Valley Primary School, which was established in 1892 and has, in 2013, 44 pupils between kindergarten and Year 7 who come from the surrounding agricultural district.

== Climate ==
Nabawa is on the borderline of the semi-arid and Mediterranean climate zones, having hot dry summers and pleasant winters with almost all the annual rainfall.

Climate data for Nabawa (1905–present)
Month	Jan	Feb	Mar	Apr	May	Jun	Jul	Aug	Sep	Oct	Nov	Dec	Year
Record high °C (°F)	47.4 (117.3)	45.8 (114.4)	43.9 (111.0)	40.7 (105.3)	35.6 (96.1)	29.4 (84.9)	28.3 (82.9)	31.1 (88.0)	37.8 (100.0)	40.6 (105.1)	43.1 (109.6)	46.1 (115.0)	47.4 (117.3)
Mean daily maximum °C (°F)	34.1 (93.4)	34.2 (93.6)	32.3 (90.1)	28.3 (82.9)	23.4 (74.1)	19.7 (67.5)	18.4 (65.1)	19.3 (66.7)	22.0 (71.6)	25.1 (77.2)	29.1 (84.4)	32.1 (89.8)	26.5 (79.7)
Mean daily minimum °C (°F)	17.8 (64.0)	18.3 (64.9)	17.2 (63.0)	14.4 (57.9)	11.1 (52.0)	9.1 (48.4)	7.5 (45.5)	7.4 (45.3)	8.1 (46.6)	10.0 (50.0)	13.3 (55.9)	15.9 (60.6)	12.5 (54.5)
Record low °C (°F)	5.0 (41.0)	7.2 (45.0)	6.1 (43.0)	2.8 (37.0)	0.3 (32.5)	0.0 (32.0)	−0.3 (31.5)	−1 (30)	−0.3 (31.5)	2.2 (36.0)	4.7 (40.5)	1.5 (34.7)	−1 (30)
Average rainfall mm (inches)	7.0 (0.28)	12.8 (0.50)	14.7 (0.58)	22.1 (0.87)	60.5 (2.38)	95.4 (3.76)	90.4 (3.56)	63.9 (2.52)	35.3 (1.39)	20.4 (0.80)	10.5 (0.41)	6.8 (0.27)	438.4 (17.26)
Average rainy days (≥ 1.0 mm)	1.1	1.4	1.8	3.3	6.8	9.6	10.2	8.6	5.9	4.0	2.1	1.1	55.9
