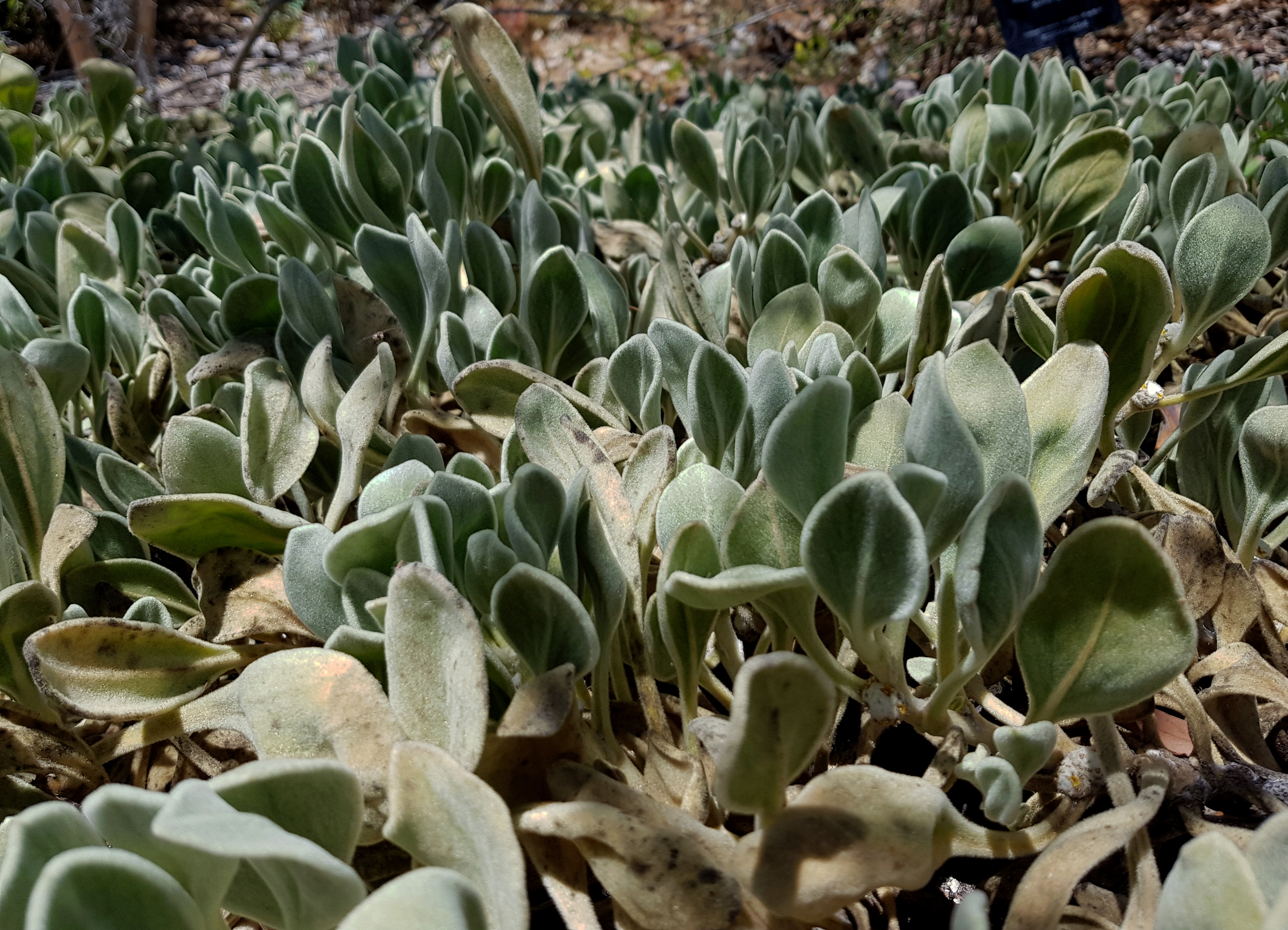

Conservation status
- Priority Three — Poorly Known Taxa (DEC)

Scientific classification
- Kingdom: Plantae
- Clade: Embryophytes
- Clade: Tracheophytes
- Clade: Spermatophytes
- Clade: Angiosperms
- Clade: Eudicots
- Clade: Asterids
- Order: Asterales
- Family: Goodeniaceae
- Genus: Scaevola
- Species: S. globosa

Binomial name
- Scaevola globosa Carolin

= Scaevola globosa =

Species of flowering plant

Scaevola globosa is a species of flowering plant in the family Goodeniaceae and is endemic to the south-west of Western Australia. It is a small, spreading shrub with fan-shaped yellow flowers and elliptic to egg-shaped leaves.

== Description ==
Scaevola globosa is a small shrub to 70 cm (28 in) high and 1 m (3 ft 3 in) wide, with sticky stems covered with simple and glandular hairs. The leaves are sessile, occasionally almost stem-clasping, egg-shaped, toothed, 21–68 mm (0.83–2.68 in) long and 6–26 mm (0.24–1.02 in) wide. The flowers are borne in spikes up to 12 cm (4.7 in) long inside a dense, globose mass of soft hairs and the wings up to 10 mm (0.39 in) wide. Flowering occurs from February to September and the fruit cylinder shaped, 4–6 mm (0.16–0.24 in) long, wrinkled and covered with soft hairs.

== Taxonomy and naming ==
This scaevola was first formally described by Roger Charles Carolin in 1974 as Nigromnia globosa. In 1990 Carolin changed the name to Scaevola globosa. The specific epithet (globosa) means 'spherical', and refers to the inflorescence.

== Distribution and habitat ==
Scaevola globosa grows in sandy soils near Carnamah, Yuna and Mingenew in the Avon Wheatbelt and Geraldton Sandplains bioregions of south-western Western Australia.

== Conservation status ==
Scaevola globosa is listed as "Priority Three" by the Government of Western Australia Department of Parks and Wildlife, meaning that it is poorly known and known from only a few locations but is not under imminent threat.
