= Banksia borealis subsp. borealis =

Scientific classification
- Kingdom: Plantae
- Clade: Tracheophytes
- Clade: Angiosperms
- Clade: Eudicots
- Order: Proteales
- Family: Proteaceae
- Genus: Banksia
- Species: B. borealis A.S.George) A.R.Mast & K.R.Thiele
- Subspecies: B. b. subsp. borealis

Trinomial name
- Banksia borealis subsp. borealis

Synonyms
- Dryandra borealis A.S.George subsp. borealis

Subspecies of plant

Banksia borealis subsp. borealis is a subspecies of Banksia borealis. As an autonym, it is defined as encompassing the type material of the species. It was known as Dryandra borealis subsp. borealis until 2007, when Austin Mast and Kevin Thiele sunk all Dryandra into Banksia. As with other members of Banksia ser. Dryandra, it is endemic to the South West Botanical Province of Western Australia.
