= Southern Cross Southwards Railway =

Proposed railway line in Western Australia

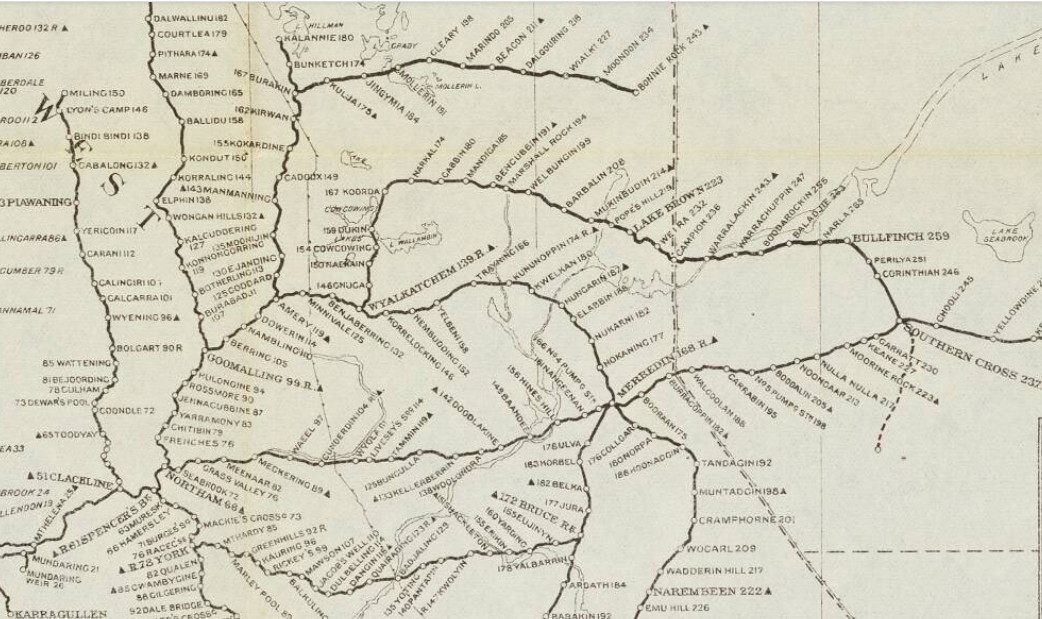
- Wheatbelt railway lines in 1934 (distances in miles): Southern Cross is to the centre-right with the proposed railway line showing below

Overview
- Status: Approved by Parliament and surveyed but not constructed
- Locale: Wheatbelt, Western Australia
- Termini: Southern Cross

Technical
- Line length: 45 km (28 mi)
- Track gauge: 1,067 mm (3 ft 6 in)
- Southern Cross Southwards Railway Main locations

The Southern Cross Southwards Railway, also referred to as the South Yilgarn railway, was an authorised but never constructed railway line in the Wheatbelt region of Western Australia. The railway line was to head south from Southern Cross, where it connected to the Eastern Goldfields Railway.

== History ==
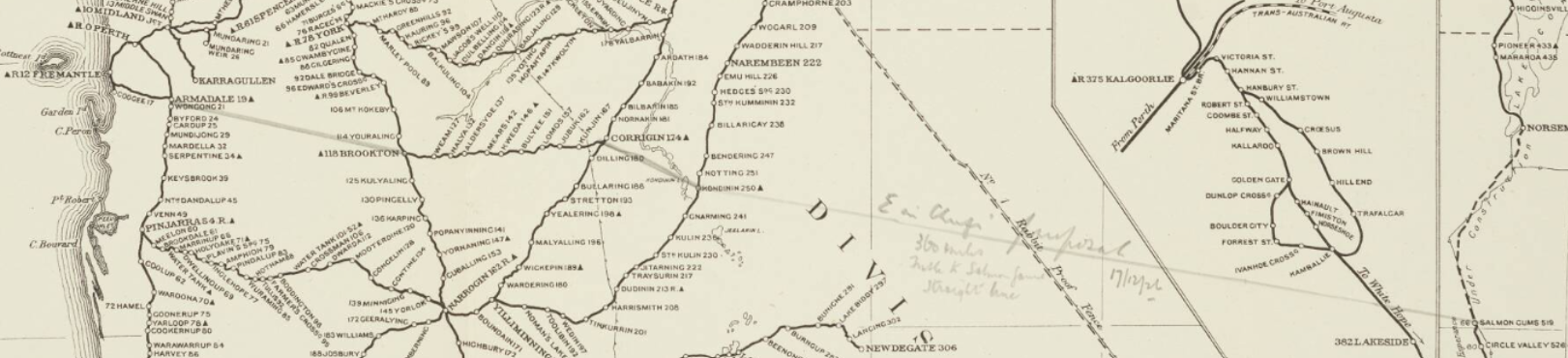
Railway lines in 1926 (distances in miles): The Armadale to Salmon Gums link is sketched in as a direct line

The Eastern Goldfields Railway railway had been opened from Northam to Southern Cross in 1894 and extended to Kalgoorlie by 1897. In 1929, the Wyalkatchem to Southern Cross railway line was opened to the north of Southern Cross, connecting it to Wyalkatchem.

In 1927, a trunk railway line from Fremantle via Armadale, Brookton and Corrigin and on from there to Salmon Gums on the Coolgardie to Esperance railway was proposed, of which only the Fremantle to Armadale and Brookton to Corrigin sections already existed. Extending the recently opened Wagin to Newdegate railway line, located further south, to Salmon Gums was not seen as a feasible option as an alternative. It was seen as a necessity to build a connecting railway line south from Southern Cross to this new trunk line. Other railway lines, south of the proposed new trunk line, were also envisioned to connect to the new line, potentially including the isolated Hopetoun to Ravensthorpe railway line. It was also proposed that, from the Wagin to Newdegate line, a branch line from Lake Grace northbound was to be constructed, eventually connecting to Southern Cross as well, but this line was only ever taken as far as Hyden.

In late 1927 and early 1928, a survey for what was called then the South Yilgarn railway was carried out, heading south and then south-west from Southern Cross to Forrestania. This 160 kilometres (99 mi) long railway, of which about half was surveyed by February 1929, was to service up to 3,000 newly-established farms in the Forrestania area. Apart from the Forrestania area, it would also serve the settlements south of Southern Cross, which was predominantly settled by former miners and referred to as the Miner's Settlement. In 1931, the Royal Commissionon Farmers' Disabilities recommended that all farms outside a 32 kilometres (20 mi) radius from a railway line should be abandoned and settlers moved to locations closer to railway lines. This would have affected many settlers south of Southern Cross and the construction of a reduced 40 kilometres (25 mi) long version of the South Yilgarn railway was still advocated for to avoid having to abandon the investments made in the area. In 1932, the state government announced that it would re-survey the line from the 3.2 kilometres (2.0 mi) mark on the Southern Cross to Forrestania line. In August 1933, a bill was introduced into the state parliament to authorise the South Yilgarn railway, with the final destination for the line now being Mount Hampton instead of Forrestania.

In August 1933, a report was published on the Southern Cross southwards and Lake Grace to Karlgarin proposals, after the Railway Advisory Board had carried out and inspection of the area in the month prior, supporting both. The Southern Cross Southwards Railway was estimated to cost £A 3,500 per mile of construction and would serve 150 farms in the area, which would produce wheat and carry sheep as livestock. Water for the railway would be sourced at Frog Rock. Rails and fastenings for the new line could be sourced from the failed Meekatharra to Horseshoe railway line.

Even before the act to authorise the railway line was passed, it was seen as a loss-making operation, estimated to lose £A 4,000 a year in October 1933. The land south of Southern Cross was farmed by many former miners, which received a subsidiary to cart their wheat overland. Members of the Western Australian Legislative Council opposed to the railway line, arguing that it would be better to move these settlers to country closer to existing railway lines or switch from wheat growing to cattle or sheep farming.

The Southern Cross Southwards Railway Act 1933, an act by the Parliament of Western Australia granted assent on 24 November 1933, authorised the construction of a 45-kilometre (28 mi) long railway line from Southern Cross southbound.

The new railway line was to head south from Southern Cross for 19 kilometres (12 mi), then south-south-westerly for 26 kilometres (16 mi). Also not stated in the act, this would have taken it into the area west of Marvel Loch. Once approved however, construction did not commence, something that was questioned by the local newspaper, The Southern Cross Times, in the years following.

The railway line was not constructed because of difficult conditions during the Great Depression. By 1936, unconstructed but approved railway lines like the Southern Cross Southwards Railway and the Yuna to Dartmoor Railway were deferred, with the possibility of constructing them if improved conditions warranted it. The two railway lines had received little funding in the previous year, sufficient only to cover preliminary work and survey expenses. In 1938, the line was reported as surveyed but not constructed. The railway line was shown as "under construction" on official Western Australian railway maps between 1934 and 1938 but not thereafter.
