= Naraling, Western Australia =

Naraling
- Town
- Interactive map of Naraling
- Coordinates: 28°24′7″S 114°51′19″E
- Country: Australia
- State: Western Australia
- LGA: Shire of Chapman Valley

Government
  - State electorate: Geraldton
  - Federal division: Durack

Area
  - Total: 114.2 km^{2} (44.1 sq mi)

Population
  - Total: 13 (SAL 2021)
- Postcode: 6532

Naraling is a locality in the Mid West region of Western Australia.

Naraling was a stopping point on the Upper Chapman Valley railway line, which operated from 1910 to 1957.
