= Oakajee, Western Australia =

Oakajee
- Town
- Interactive map of Oakajee
- Coordinates: 28.602°S 114.612°E
- Country: Australia
- State: Western Australia
- LGA: Shire of Chapman Valley
- Location: 450 km (280 mi) N of Perth; 26 km (16 mi) N of Geraldton
- Established: 1996

Government
  - State electorate: Geraldton
  - Federal division: Durack

Area
  - Total: 32.5 km^{2} (12.5 sq mi)

Population
  - Total: 0 (SAL 2016)
- Postcode: 6532

Oakajee is a locality in the Mid West region of Western Australia, about 25 kilometres (16 mi) north of the city of Geraldton.

Oakajee was a location on the Northampton railway line between 1879 and 1957.

The area was associated with the Oakajee Port proposal, a project with a long history of attempts to secure funding for construction, the most recent having stalled in 2014.
