= Mount Erin, Western Australia =

Mount Erin
- Town
- Interactive map of Mount Erin
- Coordinates: 28°33′41″S 114°51′13″E
- Country: Australia
- State: Western Australia
- LGA: Shire of Chapman Valley

Government
  - State electorate: Geraldton
  - Federal division: Durack

Area
  - Total: 85.8 km^{2} (33.1 sq mi)

Population
  - Total: 8 (SAL 2016)
- Postcode: 6532

Mount Erin is a small town in the Mid West region of Western Australia.
