= List of closed railway stations in Western Australia =

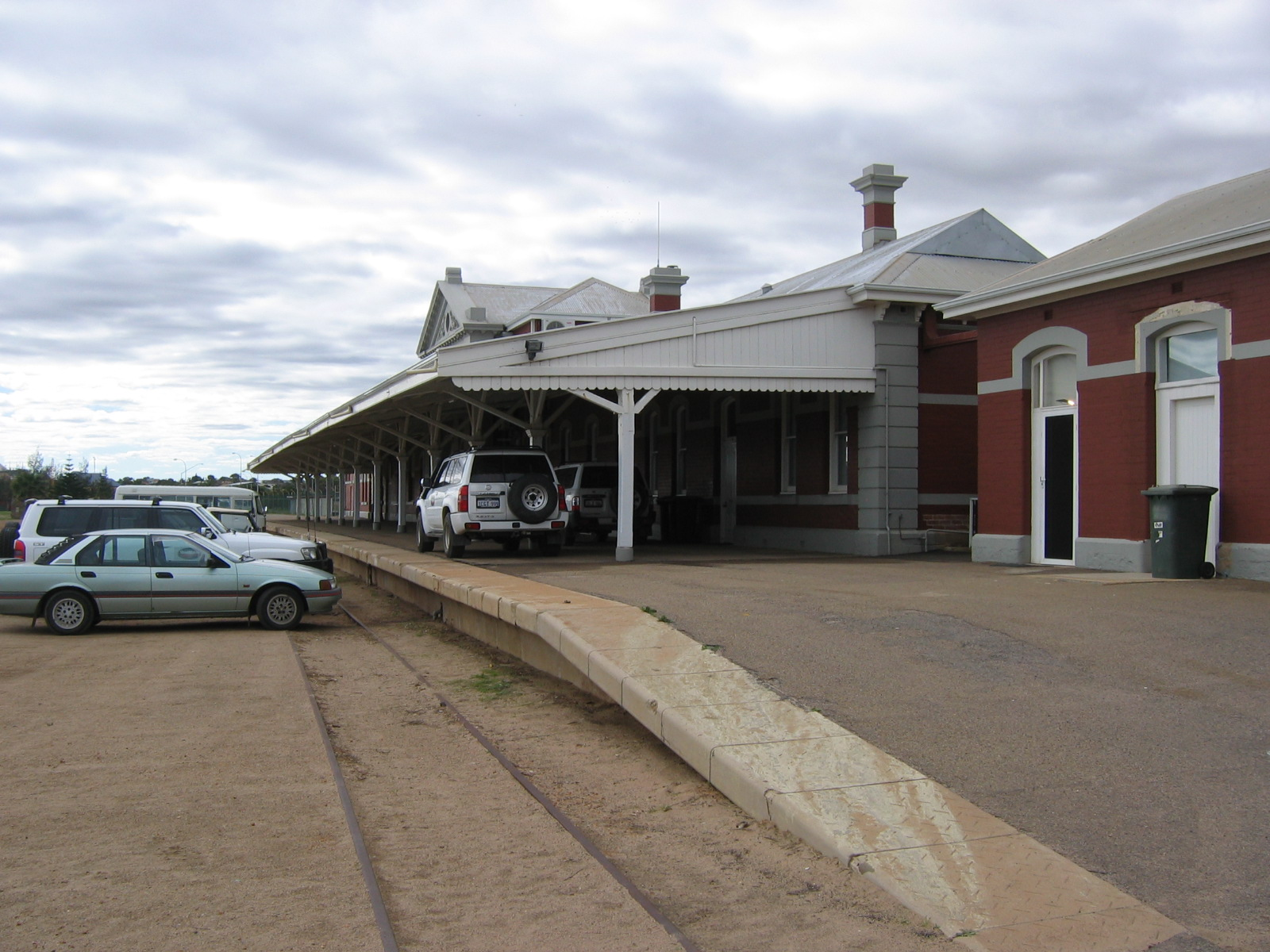
Closed Geraldton Station

List of closed railway stations in Western Australia – this list deals with former railway stations in Western Australia, some of which only platforms or fences might be the only visual remains.

The railway network of the Western Australian Government Railways at its furthest and longest reach through the state of Western Australia peaked in the early 1950s before a range of closures on non-paying lines saw considerable amounts of line and property removal.

This list of stations that are no longer used includes stations completely removed, and those which have parts of their operating structure remaining.

Considerable numbers of stopping places on the railway network were unstaffed by railway personnel, and simply constituted a shed. This list attempts to identify stations which included more than one shed with more than one space inside.

Some railway stations are now used for other purposes – the use where known is put after the name. Some examples in the Wheatbelt region are. Narrogin, Cuballing, Yornaning, Popanyinning, Carraching, Pingelly, Kulyaling, Brookton, Youraling, Mt Kokeby, Beverley, Edwards crossing, Addington, Gilgering crossing, Gwambygine, Qualen, York, Mackies crossing, Burges, Hamersley, Muresk, Spencers brook, Spring hill, Northam.

== List ==
- Boorabbin
- Boulder
- Busselton – see also Busselton to Flinders Bay Railway Rail Trail
- Clackline
- Chidlow
- Geraldton
- Hopetoun
- Margaret River
- Meekatharra
- Nannup – see also Nannup branch railway
- Nornalup
- Northam – Old Northam Railway Station now Railway and General Museum
- Ravensthorpe
- Spencers Brook
- Wiluna – see also Wiluna branch railway
- Wundowie
- Yalgoo

== See also ==
- List of Perth railway stations
