= Howatharra, Western Australia =

Howatharra
- Town
- Interactive map of Howatharra
- Coordinates: 28°32′S 114°58′E
- Country: Australia
- State: Western Australia
- LGA: Shire of Chapman Valley
- Location: 454 km (282 mi) N of Perth; 30 km (19 mi) N of Geraldton

Government
  - State electorate: Geraldton
  - Federal division: Durack

Area
  - Total: 90 km^{2} (35 sq mi)

Population
  - Total: 112 (SAL 2021)

Howatharra is a small town in the Mid West region of Western Australia, between Geraldton and Binnu. It is situated just off the North West Coastal Highway and on the Oakagee River.

The town was originally a railway siding on the Northampton railway line that was established in 1908 after the surrounding land was opened up for agriculture in the early 1900s. It was located 17 miles and 56 chains from Geraldton, on the line. Initially the town was known as Howatharra and also Webb's Siding and was gazetted as the former in 1909. A progress association was formed in 1910.

The town's name is Aboriginal in origin, and is the local name for a nearby spring.
