= Nanson, Western Australia =

Nanson
- Town
- Interactive map of Nanson
- Coordinates: 28°34′S 114°46′E
- Country: Australia
- State: Western Australia
- LGA: Shire of Chapman Valley
- Location: 455 km (283 mi) N of Perth; 34 km (21 mi) NE of Geraldton
- Established: 1910

Government
  - State electorate: Geraldton
  - Federal division: Durack

Area
  - Total: 76.7 km^{2} (29.6 sq mi)
- Elevation: 129 m (423 ft)

Population
  - Total: 84 (SAL 2021)
- Postcode: 6532

Nanson is a small town in the Mid West region of Western Australia, between the city of Geraldton and the town of Northampton. The town is situated on the banks of the Chapman River in the Chapman Valley. At the 2006 census, Nanson had a population of 386.

The surrounding area was settled in the 1850s when the property of Mount Erin was established by Michael Morrissey. In 1909 the government began to plan the Upper Chapman Valley railway line and local farmers petitioned to have a town established at the 12 mile siding. The railway was opened in 1910 and the siding was named Lauder Siding, the locals then petitioned to have the name changed to Nansonville, named for the local Member of Parliament John Nanson. The Minister for Lands agreed to change the name to Nanson and the town was gazetted in 1910. The railway siding was renamed as Mount Erin in 1912 by the Railways Department which was used locally as the town's name, as well as for an agricultural estate surrounding the town. In 1915 the railway siding was renamed "Nanson" to prevent any confusion.
