= Shire of Chapman Valley =

Coordinates: 28°30′00″S 114°47′20″E

- Local government area
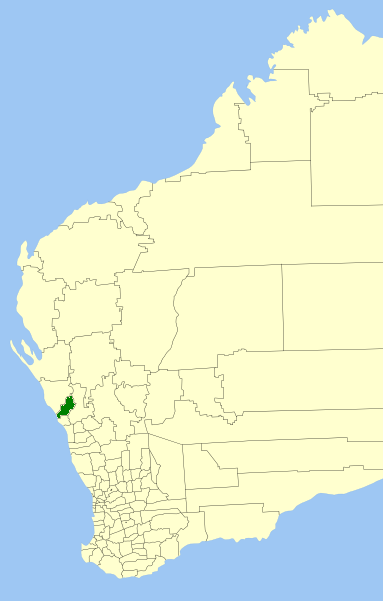
- Location in Western Australia

- Interactive map of Shire of Chapman Valley
- Country: Australia
- State: Western Australia
- Region: Mid West
- Established: 1901
- Council seat: Nabawa

Government
  - Shire President: Kirrilee Warr
  - State electorate: Geraldton
  - Federal division: Durack

Area
  - Total: 3,964.7 km^{2} (1,530.8 sq mi)

Population
  - Total: 1,556 (LGA 2021)
- Website: Shire of Chapman Valley
LGAs around Shire of Chapman Valley
Northampton	Northampton	Greater Geraldton
Indian Ocean	Shire of Chapman Valley	Greater Geraldton
Greater Geraldton	Greater Geraldton	Greater Geraldton

The Shire of Chapman Valley is a local government area located in the Mid West region of Western Australia, immediately northeast of the City of Geraldton and about 440 kilometres (273 mi) north of Perth, the state capital. The Shire covers an area of 3,965 square kilometres (1,531 sq mi) and its seat of government is the small town of Nabawa.

== History ==
Previous logo of the Shire.

The Upper Chapman Road District was established on 25 January 1901. On 28 March 1958, it was renamed to Chapman Valley Road District and on 1 July 1961, it became a Shire under the Local Government Act 1960, which reformed all remaining road districts into shires.

== Wards ==
The Shire no longer has wards - represented by 8 councillors

== Towns and localities ==
The towns and localities of the Shire of Chapman Valley with population and size figures based on the most recent Australian census:

Locality	Population	Area	Map
Buller	159 (SAL 2021)	7 km^{2} (2.7 sq mi)	
Dartmoor	9 (SAL 2021)	557.9 km^{2} (215.4 sq mi)	
Dindiloa	13 (SAL 2021)	46.4 km^{2} (17.9 sq mi)	
Durawah	6 (SAL 2021)	140.9 km^{2} (54.4 sq mi)	
East Nabawa	7 (SAL 2021)	106.6 km^{2} (41.2 sq mi)	
East Yuna	38 (SAL 2021)	498.6 km^{2} (192.5 sq mi)	
Hickety	^{[1]}	38.1 km^{2} (14.7 sq mi)	
Howatharra	112 (SAL 2021)	90 km^{2} (35 sq mi)	
Marrah	4 (SAL 2016)	106.8 km^{2} (41.2 sq mi)	
Mount Erin	8 (SAL 2016)	85.8 km^{2} (33.1 sq mi)	
Nabawa	118 (SAL 2021)	96.7 km^{2} (37.3 sq mi)	
Nanson	84 (SAL 2021)	76.7 km^{2} (29.6 sq mi)	
Naraling	13 (SAL 2021)	114.2 km^{2} (44.1 sq mi)	
Narra Tarra	104 (SAL 2021)	98.2 km^{2} (37.9 sq mi)	
Nolba	22 (SAL 2021)	218.6 km^{2} (84.4 sq mi)	
North Eradu	5 (SAL 2021)	99.7 km^{2} (38.5 sq mi)	
Oakajee	0 (SAL 2016)	32.5 km^{2} (12.5 sq mi)	
Rockwell	4 (SAL 2021)	48 km^{2} (19 sq mi)	
South Yuna	12 (SAL 2021)	101.2 km^{2} (39.1 sq mi)	
Valentine	^{[2]}	106.6 km^{2} (41.2 sq mi)	
Waggrakine *	2,679 (SAL 2021)	31.2 km^{2} (12.0 sq mi)	
Wandana	14 (SAL 2021)	848.8 km^{2} (327.7 sq mi)	
White Peak	587 (SAL 2021)	37 km^{2} (14 sq mi)	
Yetna	27 (SAL 2021)	63.2 km^{2} (24.4 sq mi)	
Yuna	43 (SAL 2021)	348.2 km^{2} (134.4 sq mi)	

- (* indicates locality is only partially located within this shire)
- ^[1] For the purpose of the 2021 Australian census, Hickety was counted as part of Dindiloa.
- ^[2] For the purpose of the 2021 Australian census, Valentine was counted as part of North Eradu.

== Population ==
Historical population

Year	Pop.	±% p.a.
1921	1,167	—
1933	1,468	+1.93%
1947	1,233	−1.24%
1954	1,550	+3.32%
1961	1,469	−0.76%
1966	806	−11.31%
1971	845	+0.95%
1976	867	+0.52%
1981	852	−0.35%

Year	Pop.	±% p.a.
1986	771	−1.98%
1991	776	+0.13%
1996	782	+0.15%
2001	875	+2.27%
2006	914	+0.88%
2009	1,069	+5.36%
2011	1,174	+4.80%
2016	1,422	+3.91%
2021	1,556	+1.82%

== Heritage-listed places ==
As of 2023, 97 places are heritage-listed in the Shire of Chapman Valley, of which eight are on the State Register of Heritage Places.
