= Oakajee Port =

Proposed port in Western Australia

Coordinates: 28°35′22″S 114°35′00″E

Oakajee Port is a proposed deep water port to be built in the Mid West region of Western Australia, 24 kilometres (15 mi) north of Geraldton, to service the region's growing iron ore industry.

== History ==
Between 1879 and 1957, Oakagee was a siding and locality on the Northampton railway line. The site was first considered as a port and railway terminus in the 1980s.

Opposition to the project from local residents centred on environmental concerns, especially in relation to nearby Coronation Beach.

Advocacy for the project was from a partnership known as Geraldton Iron Ore Alliance, which included miners Mount Gibson Iron, Midwest Corporation, Murchison Metals, Gindalbie Metals, Golden West Resources, Royal Resources, Asia Iron Holdings and Atlas Iron.

An alternative project considered by the government was to deepen and enlarge the existing Geraldton Port. However, environmental factors associated with the proposal being relatively close to Geraldton militated against it.

Including an associated rail project, the project was estimated to cost about $4 billion. The port was to have an initial capacity of 45 million tonnes of iron ore annually. Construction was expected to start in 2011, with completion possible by 2014.

In 2012, media speculation about cancellation of the project increased with announcements of delays and cutbacks.

Despite increasing speculation in 2012 that the project would be cancelled following delays and cost-cutting measures, Premier Colin Barnett maintained that the Western Australian government would continue working with the project proponents and other interested parties to advance the project.

In June 2013, Mitsubishi Corporation announced that work was to be suspended until an investment partner could be found. As of November 2014 the project was mothballed.

In November 2019, Sinosteel purchased Mitsubishi's shareholding. In January 2022, Fortescue announced it had signed a memorandum of understanding with Sinosteel to investigate the feasibility of reviving the project.

== Location ==
The port and facilities were to be constructed within approximately 6,400 hectares (16,000 acres) of land owned by the state government. The property had been used as farmland but 1,100 hectares (2,700 acres) was zoned for heavy industrial and 200 hectares (490 acres) zoned for support industries.

It is bordered approximately by the Buller River to the south, Coronation Beach Road to the north, and the Moresby Ranges to the east.

== Railway ==
The port was intended to be served by a 570 kilometre standard gauge railway line. To facilitate this Brookfield Rail rebuilt part of the existing narrow gauge line with dual gauge sleepers.
