= Yuna, Western Australia =

Yuna
- Town
- Interactive map of Yuna
- Coordinates: 28.328324°S 115.00151°E
- Country: Australia
- State: Western Australia
- LGA: Shire of Chapman Valley
- Location: 503 km (313 mi) NNW of Perth; 37 km (23 mi) NE of Nabawa
- Established: 1913

Government
  - State electorate: Geraldton
  - Federal division: Durack

Area
  - Total: 348.2 km^{2} (134.4 sq mi)

Population
  - Total: 43 (SAL 2021)
- Postcode: 6532

Yuna is a small town in the Mid West region of Western Australia, in the Shire of Chapman Valley, 62 kilometres (39 mi) northeast of the city of Geraldton.

The state government was petitioned in 1910 by the Yuna Farmer's Association to survey lots in 1910. The government delayed acting on the request until the Upper Chapman railway line extension route was decided on. This was completed in 1912 and then some wrangling over the best townsite ensued.

One site to the west near a spring and close to the railway line was dubbed West Yuna and a siding was built; it was gazetted as West Yuna in 1913, then changed to Whelarra in 1918 and finally cancelled in 1968.

The Yuna Agricultural Hall was built in 1919 then gutted by fire and then completely collapsing in 1922.

Because of the site at West Yuna, development of the current site was initially opposed by the government and mined for pottery clay. A school was erected in 1927 and then the government decided to assist with development with lots being surveyed in 1929.

The name is Aboriginal in origin and was first recorded in 1863 as Younah Springs; it is thought to mean bad or rotten meat.

The main industry in town is wheat farming, with the town being a Cooperative Bulk Handling receival site.

== Transport ==
It was the terminus of the railway line from Wokarina. The line opened on 3 May 1912 and closed on 29 April 1957.

The Yuna-Dartmoor Railway Act 1933, assented to on 24 November 1933, authorised the construction of an 82 kilometres (51 mi) railway line from Yuna to Dartmoor and a contour survey was carried out but the line was not built. In 1944, it was proposed that this railway line should be part of an Ajana to Mullewa line.

In 1932 the Wheat Pool of Western Australia announced that the town would have two grain elevators, each fitted with an engine, installed at the railway siding.
