= Geraldton railway station =

Former railway station in Western Australia

Geraldton
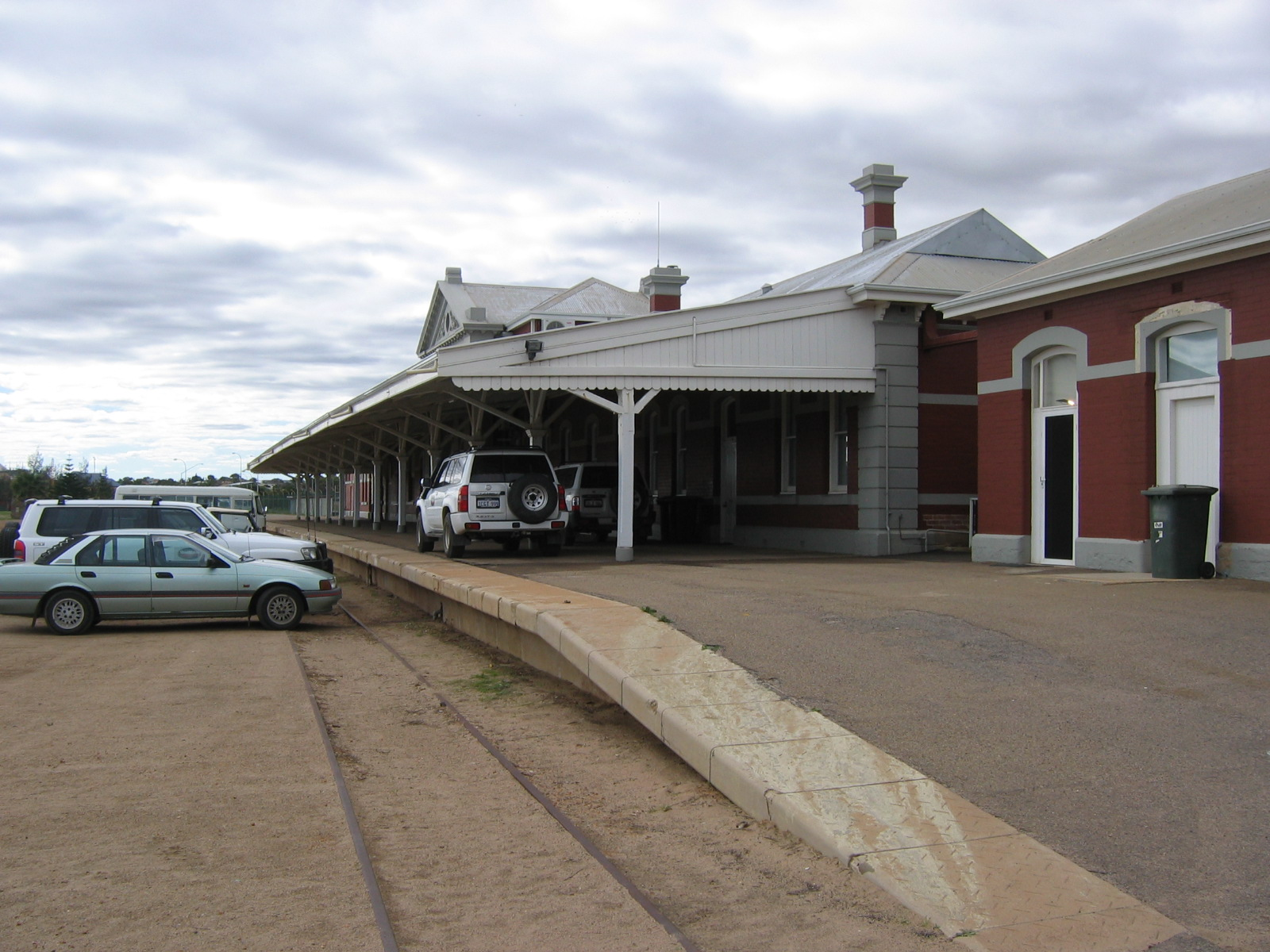
- Station in July 2007

General information
- Location: Chapman Road, Geraldton
- Coordinates: 28.766909°S 114.6151°E
- Owner: Transwa
- Operator: Transwa
- Lines: Kwinana-Geraldton; Northampton
- Platforms: 1

Construction
- Structure type: Ground

Other information
- Status: Closed
- Website

Western Australia Heritage Register
- Designated: 15 May 1998
- Reference no.: 1052

History
- Opened: 26 July 1879
- Rebuilt: 1900; 1911
Location

Geraldton railway station was originally the terminus of Northampton lines in Western Australia. It is located in Geraldton.

== History ==
On 26 July 1879, the original Geraldton station opened as part of the Northampton line. It was the first government railway station in Western Australia.

With the discovery of gold in the Murchison River, a new station was built off Durlacher Street. On 8 August 1900, it became the Geraldton Mechanic's Institute Library, with a second storey added in 1908. In 1975, the library was shifted to a new location and in 1979 the building was handed over to the WA Museum.

When the WA Museum relocated to its new premises in 2000, the old station building lay vacant until restored in 2014 as the City of Greater Geraldton Visitor Centre. In 1911, a third station opened, with the second relocated to become the District Engineers Office.

The station is today utilised by Transwa road coach services to Perth. Creative, cultural and health services operate out of adjoining rooms, and a small cafe also operates from this building.
