= Upper Chapman Valley railway line =

Railway line in Western Australia

Overview
- Owner: Government of Western Australia
- Locale: Mid West, Western Australia
- Termini: Glenfield; Yuna

Service
- Operator(s): Western Australian Government Railways

History
- Commenced: 1909
- Opened: 3 May 1912
- Closed: 29 April 1957

Technical
- Line length: 61 km (38 mi)
- Track gauge: 1,067 mm (3 ft 6 in)
- Upper Chapman Valley railway line Main locations

The Upper Chapman Valley railway line was a 61-kilometre (38 mi) long Western Australian Government Railways operated railway line in the Mid West region of Western Australia, connecting Wokarina, a siding on the Northampton railway line at Glenfield, to Yuna.

The railway line, also referred to as the Wokarina to Yuna railway line or Geraldton to Yuna railway line, opened in its first section to Naraling in 1910 and its full extension to Yuna two years later. An extension to Dartmoor, which would have more than doubled the line's length, was authorised in 1933 but never constructed. In 1960, the railway line, alongside twelve others in the state, was officially closed.

== History ==
The Northampton railway line, officially opened in July 1879, was the first government railway line to be built in Western Australia.

The Upper Chapman Railway Act 1909, an act by the Parliament of Western Australia granted assent on 16 January 1909, authorised the construction of the section of the Upper Chapman Valley railway line from Glenfield to Naraling. The contract to construct this 42-kilometre (26 mi) section of railway was awarded to Rennie & Hill on 27 August 1909 and the railway line was officially opened on 1 October 1910.

The Naraling–Yuna Railway Act 1911, assented to on 16 February 1911, authorised the construction of the extension of the railway line from Naraling to Yuna. The contract for the 19-kilometre (12 mi) Naraling to Yuna section was awarded to the Western Australian Public Works Department on 30 June 1911 and the railway line opened on 3 May 1912.

The Yuna–Dartmoor Railway Act 1933, assented to on 24 November 1933, authorised an extension of the railway line from Yuna to Dartmoor. This 82-kilometre (51 mi) section was surveyed but never constructed. Even when authorised, this line was not without opposition in parliament but the area was not considered suitable for road transport at the time and the new line was thought to be beneficial for 300 farms in the area. The Yuna to Dartmoor extension was not constructed because of difficult conditions during the Great Depression. By 1936, unconstructed but approved railway lines like the Dartmoor extension and the Southern Cross Southwards Railway were deferred, with the possibility of constructing them if improved conditions warranted it. The two railway lines had received little funding in the previous year, sufficient only to cover preliminary work and survey expenses.

Alternative extension proposals for the Yuna line existed throughout its history. Before the never-constructed Dartmoor extension was decided on, in the late 1920s, a connection from Yuna to Mullewa in the south-east, and a separate extension via Dartmoor to Ajana. Both proposals were still discussed in the 1940s.

In 1954, the state government of Western Australia had compiled a list of loss-making railway operations, of which the Wokarina to Yuna line was one, having had a total expenditure of almost four times its earnings in the financial year to June 1953, £A 29,593 expenditure versus earnings of £A 9,512. Figures for the Wokarina to Ajana section on the Northampton line were even worse, with this line having made a loss of £A 47,790.

Original rail services on the line consisted of two mixed passenger and freight trains per week, operated with steam engines. From 1938, these were replaced by the diesel-electric Governor class, which improved services. By the 1950s, improved road transport resulted in a decline in the need to rail services and just one return train to Geraldton per week operated on Fridays. The last service on the line operated on 29 April 1957.

The Railways (Cue-Big Bell and other Railways) Discontinuance Act 1960, assented to on 12 December 1960, authorised the official closure of 13 railway lines in Western Australia, among them the Upper Chapman Valley railway. The same act also officially closed the Northampton railway line. The railway line and sleepers were removed the following year, in 1961.

== Legacy ==
The Shire of Chapman Valley lists the entire Upper Chapman Valley railway line on its heritage register, which also includes the Nanson railway siding and railway bridge, the sites of Nabawa and Yetna sidings and the Whelarra dam.
