= Northampton railway line =

Former railway line in Western Australia

- Geraldton to Ajana railway line

Overview
- Status: Closed
- Owner: Government of Western Australia
- Termini: Geraldton; Northampton

Service
- Operator(s): Western Australian Government Railways

History
- Opened: 26 July 1879
- Closed: 29 April 1957

The Northampton railway line, also referred to as the Geraldton to Ajana railway line, ran from Geraldton through Northampton and on to Ajana in Western Australia. It operated between 1879 and 1957. It was the first government railway constructed in Western Australia.

== Opening ==
The Geraldton and Northampton Railway Act 1873, assented to on 22 November 1873, authorised the construction of a railway line from Geraldton and Northampton.

Construction of the Geraldton railway station commenced in June 1878; the foundation stone was laid by Eliza, wife of Maitland Brown, on 21 August 1878, and it was completed in February 1879, the first railway station in the colony.

The line opened to Northampton on 26 July 1879. The Geraldton to Northampton section was 33 miles 25 chains (53.6 km) in length; the Northampton to Ajana section was 33 miles 5 chains (53.2 km), and was a later extension. The line closed on 29 April 1957.

The line's extension from Northampton the Ajana was authorised through the Northampton–Ajana Railway Act 1911, assented to on 16 February 1911.

== Locomotives ==
The line, as an isolated line, was constructed by two 2-6-0 Kitson locomotives. Originally classed as E1 and E2 they were later classified as M class. They were constructed in 1875, and were in service on the line until 1893. Also between 1879 and 1885 two Fairlie locomotives worked on the line.

== Northampton railway station ==
Northampton had two railway stations, the first (named Gwalla) lasted between 26 July 1879 until January 1884. The second (named Mary Street) was opened in 1913 and closed when the railway closed in 1957.

== Stopping places ==
- Geraldton
- Bluff Point (junction to Narngulu)
- Webberton
- Waggrakine
- Chapman
- Glenfield
- Wokarina (junction to Yuna)
- Sione Siding
- White Peak
- Oakajee
- Howatharra
- Webb's
- Taylor's
- Oakabella
- McGuire
- Iseeka
- Chally
- Ryans
- Bowes
- Northampton
- Baddera
- Ogilvie
- Hutt
- Binnu
- Ajana (terminus)

An interactive map of the line is available on OpenStreetMap.

In 2005 an old railway wagon was identified as being possibly the first item of rolling stock built for use on the line.

== Closure ==
In 1954, the state government of Western Australia had compiled a list of loss-making railway operations, of which the Geraldton to Wokerina and on to Ajana and Yuna lines were part, having had a total expenditure of two to four times their earnings in the financial year to June 1953. The Geraldton to Wokerina line was the least loss-making of the three lines terminating at Wokerina, having £A 13,612 expenditure versus earnings of £A 6,734. Wokerina to Ajana was the most costly of the three lines, having an expenditure of £A 62,161 versus earnings of £A 14,371.

On 29 April 1957 the line was closed, along with the associated Wokarina – Naraling – Yuna railway line at the same time.

The Railways (Cue-Big Bell and other Railways) Discontinuance Act 1960, which officially closed the Geraldton to Ajana line, was assented to on 12 December 1960. This act affected a number of Western Australian railways, officially closing 13 railway lines in the state.

== See also ==
- Northern Railway (Western Australia)
